= Martha Kearney =

British-Irish journalist and broadcaster (born 1957)

Martha Kearney CBE
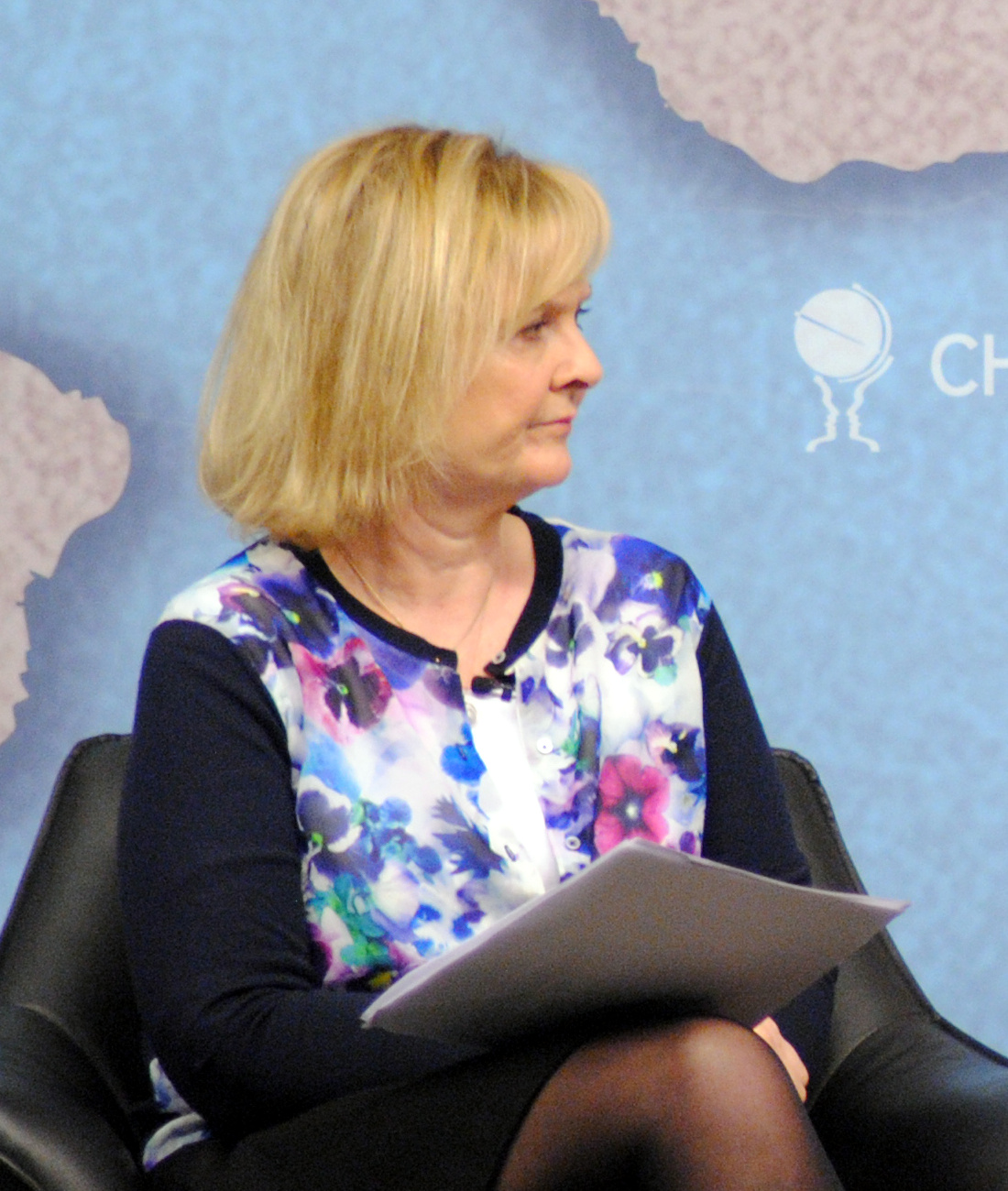
- Kearney in 2014
- Born: 8 October 1957 (age 68); Dublin, Ireland
- Education: Brighton and Hove High School; George Watson's College
- Alma mater: St Anne's College, Oxford
- Occupations: Journalist, presenter
- Notable credit(s): Woman's Hour; Newsnight; The World at One
- Spouse: Chris Shaw (m. 2001)
- Parent(s): Hugh Kearney (1924–2017); Catherine "Kate" Murphy

Martha Catherine Kearney (born 8 October 1957) is a British-Irish journalist and broadcaster. She was the main presenter of BBC Radio 4's lunchtime news programme The World at One for 11 years.

In April 2018, Kearney joined the presenting team of the early morning Today programme. In February 2024 she announced her intention to step down from Today after the 2024 United Kingdom general election, and she did so on 18 July 2024. She is to stay with Radio 4, hosting a new series called This Natural Life and continuing to present episodes of Open Country.

== Early life ==
Kearney was born in Dublin, and brought up in an academic environment; her father, the historian Hugh Kearney, taught first at Sussex and later at Edinburgh universities. She was educated at St Joseph's (later St Wilfrid's) Catholic School, Burgess Hill, Sussex, during her primary-school years. Her secondary education was first, briefly, at the private Brighton and Hove High School, and then at the private George Watson's Ladies College in Edinburgh. From 1976 to 1980 she read classics at St Anne's College, Oxford.

== Career ==
Kearney began her career as a phone operator on phone-in programmes at the London commercial radio station LBC and Independent Radio News in London. She was a reporter on the AM programme before becoming a political correspondent when she covered the 1987 general election. In 1988 she joined A Week in Politics on Channel 4 as a reporter. In 1990 she moved to the BBC's political programme On the Record.

=== BBC ===
In 1998, Kearney became a regular presenter of BBC Radio 4's Woman's Hour. In 2000 she became political editor of BBC Two's Newsnight programme. She presented Newsnight and its weekly consumer survey of entertainment and culture, Newsnight Review, with increasing frequency. She was a candidate to succeed Andrew Marr as the BBC's political editor in 2005, but lost out to Nick Robinson.

Kearney featured in a spoof segment of the BBC comedy series Time Trumpet, titled "Honey, I Shrunk Martha Kearney", in which Jeremy Paxman, in a fantasy version of Newsnight, interviewed her when she was a third of her normal size. She also featured later in the episode in a spoof report from Notting Hill. In 2006, she presented with her father a Radio 4 series on the history of universities in Britain, The Idea of a University.

Kearney presented her final Woman's Hour on 19 March 2007 and her final Newsnight on 23 March 2007. She became the main presenter of Radio 4's lunchtime news programme The World at One on 16 April 2007. She presented Newsnight Review which became The Review Show from 2006 until 2014.

Kearney was nominated for a BAFTA award for her coverage of the Northern Ireland peace process in 1998. She was, with Jenni Murray, 2004 TRIC radio presenter of the year, and won a Sony bronze award for a programme on child poverty. She was awarded Political Commentator of the Year by The House magazine in 2006. In 2014 the Voice of the Listener & Viewer awarded her its Best Individual Contribution to Radio award.

In 2013, Kearney won her episode of the Great Comic Relief Bake Off competing against Claudia Winkleman, Ed Byrne and Helen Glover.

In 2015, she took part in the 50th anniversary celebrations of The World at One.

Kearney joined Today on Radio 4 in April 2018 as a main presenter, swapping posts with Sarah Montague.

Other BBC work includes The Secret World of Lewis Carroll (2015) for BBC Two. Other BBC work includes Being The Brontes (2016) for BBC Two, The Great Butterfly Adventure (2016) for BBC Four, The Books That Made Britain (2016) for BBC One, Great Irish Journeys (2017) for BBC Four, and MAKE! Craft Britain (2017) for BBC Four.

She has also presented Talking Books for the BBC from Hay Festival interviewing Kazuo Ishiguro and Marlon James amongst others.

In February 2024, Kearney announced she would leave the Today programme, after the 2024, General Election. Her replacement is Emma Barnett. Kearney's last day on Today was 18 July 2024; she is to stay with Radio 4, hosting a new series called This Natural Life and continuing to present episodes of Open Country.

=== Other activities ===
In January 1969, shortly after turning 11, Kearney appeared in the title role of The Ditchling Players' amateur production of Alice Through the Looking Glass. She also voiced her role on the privately-pressed album of music that was recorded at the time (only 50 copies were made), which has since become one of the most legendary and highly-sought rarities in global recording-collecting.

In 2004, Kearney was a judge for the Baillie Gifford Prize for Non-Fiction (formerly the Samuel Johnson Prize for non-fiction). She chaired the Prize's judging panel in 2020. In 2005, she chaired the judges for the women-only Orange Prize for Fiction.

Kearney chaired the judges for the 2012 Hippocrates Prize for Poetry and Medicine and in 2013 was a judge for the Man Booker Prize.

Kearney was President of the Classical Association, 2013–14.

Kearney's husband was an executive producer of the Academy Awards nominated short documentary Watani: My Homeland. In the run-up to the ceremony Kearney described her preparations for the "red carpet" with Eddie Mair on the Radio 4 PM programme.

Kearney is a keen bee-keeper and has made the BBC programmes Who Killed The Honey Bee (2009) for BBC Four, The Wonder of Bees (2014) for BBC Four and a two-part nature documentary Hive Alive (2014) alongside Chris Packham for BBC Two.

In 2023, it was announced that Kearney had joined Camphill Milton Keynes Communities as their patron. The charity was home to her brother-in-law for more than 30 years, and she is supporting them to launch their £15m capital campaign.

In March 2025, Kearney was appointed as a trustee of the British Museum.

== Personal life ==
Kearney married Chris Shaw, senior programme controller at Channel 5, in 2001 in Diss, Norfolk. The couple live in Wortham, Suffolk.

Media offices
| Preceded by Nick Clarke | Main presenter: The World at One; 2007–2018 | Succeeded by Sarah Montague |
| Preceded by Mark Mardell | Political Editor: Newsnight; 2000–2007 | Succeeded by Michael Crick |
