= Hugh Sykes (journalist) =

- Education: The Queen's College, Oxford
- Occupation: Journalist
- Notable credit: PM

Hugh Sykes is a journalist employed by BBC News, specifically reporting for news programmes on BBC Radio 4. Sykes can regularly be heard reporting for PM, The World at One, Broadcasting House and The World This Weekend.

== Career ==
Sykes began his broadcast career at BBC Radio Oxford while studying at The Queen's College, Oxford University. From there he went on to work for LBC from 1973 to 1974. After that he joined the BBC where he has continually worked since. His first regular BBC work was as a continuity announcer and presenter/reporter for the BBC West TV region. On Halloween in 1977, he received a written warning from BBC management in Bristol after he had ended the closedown routine at 1.20 am (following a Vincent Price horror film, The Tomb of Ligeia) by using a 500 watt uplight to cast spectral shadows across his face as he warned any viewers with black cats to keep a close eye on them that night in case they were abducted by witches.

Today was Sykes' first break into national media. He was hired by the programme soon after covering the 1978 sleeper-train fire in Taunton, Somerset, in which 12 people died. Sykes had interviewed a seriously burned survivor, who said from his hospital bed that many passengers had been unable to escape the flames and smoke because the carriage doors were locked and there was nothing available with which to break the sealed double-glazed windows.[Source: Sykes himself] On Today, Sykes worked as a reporter and as frequent presenter along with Brian Redhead and John Timpson.

In 1987 Sykes moved to the PM programme as a presenter. In 1995 he went back on the road as a reporter for PM and its sister programmes The World at One, The World this Weekend and Broadcasting House.

== Assignments ==
Over the course of his career, Sykes has reported from many countries across the world. Whilst working for Today he reported the 1980 Carter-Reagan US presidential election and covered the 1984 miners' strike. In recent times Sykes has particularly focused on reporting from the Middle East including the Iraq War, the presidential election in Iran in 2009, and the rise, decline and fall of the 'Arab Spring' in Egypt between 2011 and 2013.

Sykes has reported regularly from Iraq, Pakistan, Jordan, Lebanon, Israel, the occupied Palestinian Territories, South Africa, Germany, Turkey and Northern Ireland. He has also been on assignment in India, China, Syria, Russia, France, Italy, Spain, Mozambique, Tanzania, Libya, Tunisia, Algeria, Ethiopia, Yemen and South Sudan.

Sykes has survived a roadside bomb during the 2005 elections in Iraq, a death threat in Northern Ireland, and an assault by striking coal miners in Wigan who tried to throw him into a canal.{Sykes has a recording of this incident}

== Awards ==
In 2004 and 2005, Sykes was awarded the Gold and Silver Sony Radio Academy awards as Journalist of the Year. He also won Deuxième Prix at the Bayeux war correspondents' awards, les prix Bayeux-Calvados des correspondants de guerre, three times.
