= Nick Clarke Award =

Journalism prize created by the BBC

- Awarded for: Best broadcast interview of the year
- Venue: Cheltenham Literature Festival
- Country: United Kingdom
- Presented by: BBC
- First award: 2008; 18 years ago
- Final award: 2015; 11 years ago

The Nick Clarke Award is a journalism prize created by the BBC in honour of Nick Clarke, former presenter of BBC Radio 4's The World At One, who died in November 2006. Its aim is to "celebrate and recognise the best broadcast interview of the year".

== Background ==
The Nick Clarke Award was launched by then Radio 4 Controller Mark Damazer at the Cheltenham Literature Festival in October 2007. It is presented at the festival each year, the inaugural prize being awarded in October 2008. The Panellists and judges of the Nick Clarke Award come from the BBC and other media and broadcast organisations. As part of the award, the winner receives a case of claret, a favourite tipple of Clarke's.

== Award winners ==
- 2008: Carrie Gracie (BBC World Service) – for her interview with Alan Johnston
- 2009: Victoria Derbyshire (BBC Radio 5 Live) – for her interview of Peter Bacon
- 2010: P.D. James (BBC Radio 4) – for her interview with BBC Director Mark Thompson
- 2011: Steve Hewlett (BBC Radio 4) – for his interview with Lady Peta Buscombe
- 2012: Stewart White (BBC News Look East) – for his interview with Lord Hanningfield following the peer’s release from prison after his conviction on expenses fraud.
- 2013: Iain Lee (BBC Three Counties Radio) – for his interview with Stephen Conroy, acting chief executive of Bedford Hospital NHS Trust
- 2014: Stephen Nolan (The Nolan Show) (BBC Northern Ireland) – for his interview with Pastor James McConnell. The interview dealt with the Belfast preacher's controversial denunciation of Muslims and their faith.
- 2015: Jeremy Bowen (BBC Middle East Editor) (BBC) – for his interview with Bashar al-Assad. The interview was a wide-ranging talk with al-Assad, covering not least the Syrian President's actions against his own citizens and the changing dynamic of the fight against the Islamic State.
- 2016: Stephen Nolan (BBC Radio 5 Live) – for his interview with Michael O'Connor a survivor of the November 2015 Paris attacks at the Bataclan (theatre) music venue.

The Nick Clarke Award website has not been updated since the shortlist was published for 2016.
