= Americana (radio series) =

BBC radio program

- Running time: 30 minutes
- Country of origin: United Kingdom
- Language: English
- Home station: BBC Radio 4
- Hosted by: Matt Frei; Jonny Dymond
- Recording studio: BBC Washington bureau
- Original release: 31 May 2009 – 11 September 2011
- No. of episodes: 119
- Website: www.bbc.co.uk/programmes/b00kpjpm
- Podcast: downloads.bbc.co.uk/podcasts/radio4/americana/rss.xml

Americana is a British radio programme broadcast on BBC Radio 4 from spring 2009 to autumn 2011. It offered a "mix of discussion, interviews and features, with a focus on the voices of ordinary Americans" and was touted as the "successor to the late Alistair Cooke's Letter from America."

Americana was broadcast for the first time on 31 May 2009 with Matt Frei as presenter; According to Frei, he expected listeners to Americana would hear "what America is talking, arguing, fretting, laughing and, yes, dreaming about. We hope to surprise, entertain and inform. And by letting America itself do most of the talking we promise never to be dull." After Frei left the BBC in May 2011, Jonny Dymond took over as presenter.

In July 2011, BBC Radio 4 revealed that Radio 4 controller Gwyneth Williams, "interest[ed] in wider internationalism and less emphasis on the US", decided to cancel Americana, effective in autumn. The show's final episode was broadcast on 11 September 2011; the topic was the tenth anniversary of the September 11 attacks.
