= Agenda (British TV programme) =

- Presented by: James Cox; John Foster; George Reid

Production
- Producer: BBC Scotland Current Affairs
- Production locations: Glasgow, Scotland

Original release
- Network: BBC One Scotland
- Release: 17 October 1981 – 1 June 1984

Agenda is a British current affairs television programme that was broadcast on BBC Scotland during the early part of the 1980s, airing mostly on Sundays at 1:25 pm before being moved to Friday evening. It was a successor to the general current affairs programme Current Account, which ran from 1968 until May 1983. Agenda's first presenter was James Cox with Kenneth Cargill producing. The editor was Matthew Spicer.

Subsequently, the former SNP politician George Reid presented the programme, and the producer was Kirsty Wark, later to become a television presenter in her own right. The series was replaced by Left, Right and Centre.

== Past presenters and reporters ==
- James Cox
- John Foster
- George Reid
- Kenneth Roy

== Past directors and producers ==
- Kenneth Cargill
- Kirsty Wark
