= Brian Widlake =

- Born: Nigel Brian Windsor Widlake; 13 April 1931; Fiji
- Died: 2 January 2017 (aged 85); Wiltshire, United Kingdom
- Education: Colet Court School, London; St Paul's School, London
- Alma mater: Clare College, Cambridge
- Occupations: TV presenter, journalist, correspondent
- Employer(s): BBC, LBC, ITN
- Known for: Main presenter, The World at One (BBC Radio 4); Main co-presenter, PM, BBC Radio 4 Presenter, Main News, LBC; Main co-presenter, The Money Programme, BBC Two; Former ITN correspondent
- Spouse(s): Joy Harford (divorced); Anne Nicholas (m. 1989)
- Children: 2 and 3 step-children

Nigel Brian Windsor Widlake (13 April 1931 – 2 January 2017) was a British journalist, broadcaster and presenter.

== Early life ==
Widlake was born in Fiji on 13 April 1931.

== Education ==
Widlake was educated at two independent schools for boys, at the time based in Hammersmith in West London: first at Colet Court School, now known as St Paul's Juniors, when, shortly after enrolment, he and others were evacuated to the village of Much Hadham in Hertfordshire in the early part of the Second World War, and then at St Paul's School, followed by Clare College, Cambridge.

== Life and career ==
Widlake served initially as a cadet before his promotion to 2nd Lieutenant in the Royal Hampshire Regiment on 4 November 1950.

Widlake worked as a reporter for ITN in the 1960s, and was a regular presenter of BBC Radio 4's news magazine programmes The World at One and PM during the 1970s and 1980s. Widlake joined London's news and talk radio station LBC to present a breakfast programme on LBC Crown FM, later LBC NewsTalk 97.3 in 1989. He then transferred to LBC's hour-long Midday News programme.

Widlake conducted Nelson Mandela's first ever televised interview in 1961. At the time, Mandela was on the run from the South African police. He also became well known for co-presenting The Money Programme on BBC 2 in the early 1980s with Valerie Singleton.

Widlake died, following a short illness, at home in Wiltshire on 2 January 2017, at the age of 85.

== Personal life ==
He had one daughter and one son, as well as one stepdaughter and two stepsons.

Widlake died on 2 January 2017 in Wiltshire.

Media offices
Preceded by William Davis	Main presenter: The World at One	Succeeded by David Jessel
