= Steve Hewlett (journalist) =

British journalist (1958-2017)

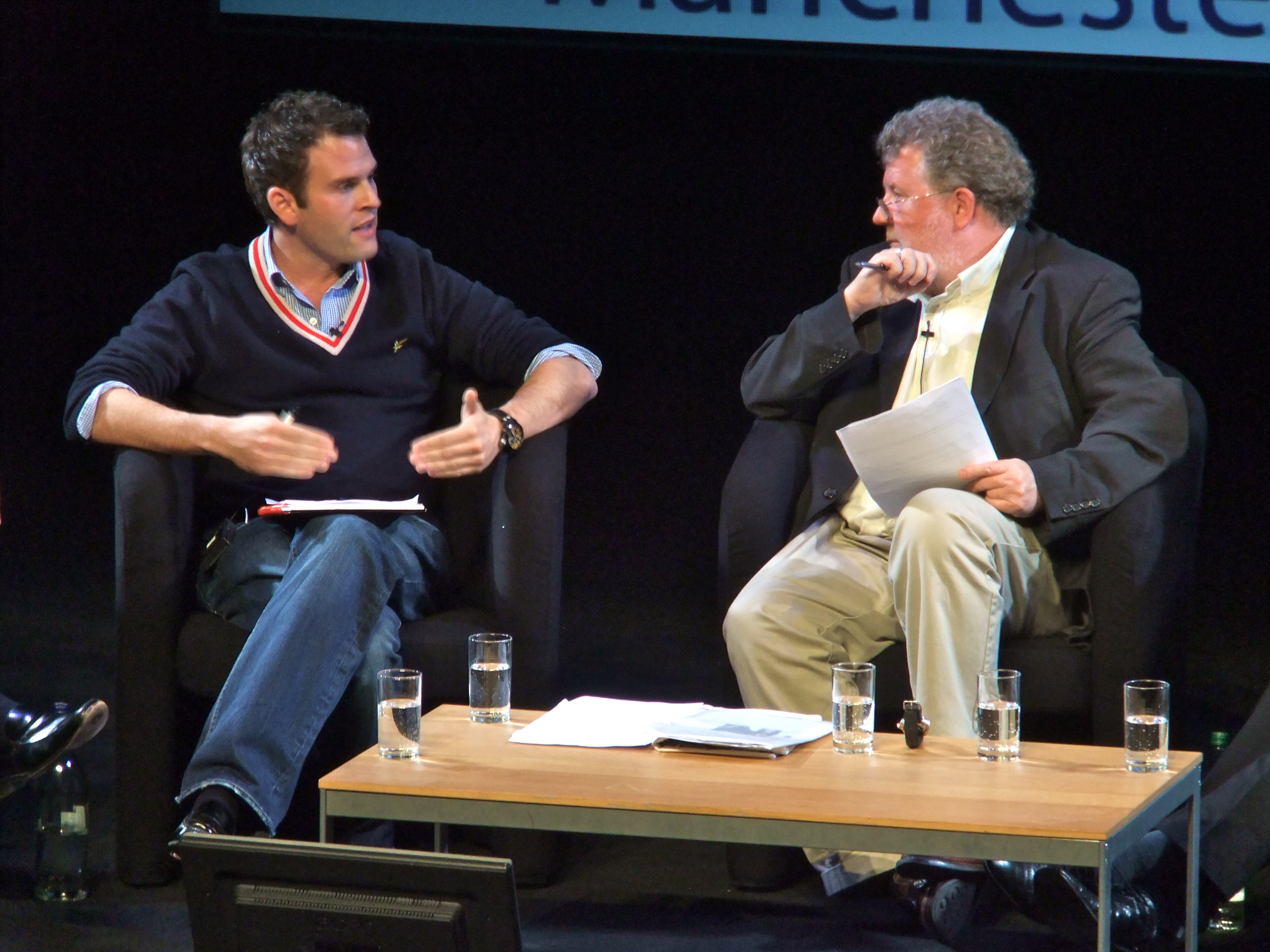
- Hewlett (right) and Ashley Tabor-King in October 2010
- Born: Stephen Edward Hewlett; 8 August 1958; Solihull, Warwickshire, England
- Died: 20 February 2017 (aged 58); Chelsea, London, England
- Education: Manchester University
- Occupation: Journalist
- Spouse: Rachel Crellin (m. 2017)
- Children: 3

Stephen Edward Hewlett (8 August 1958 – 20 February 2017) was a British print, radio and TV journalist, and visiting professor of Journalism and Broadcast Policy at the University of Salford.

== Early life ==
Hewlett was born on 8 August 1958. Adopted as a baby by Lawrence and Vera Hewlett from a children's home in Birmingham, he later described his adoptive family as "fabulously caring and supportive". Hewlett was educated at Harold Malley Grammar School in Solihull (the school now called Alderbrook), and the local sixth form college. In 1981 he graduated in liberal studies in science at Manchester University, where as a student activist he helped organise a rent strike.

== Career ==
On graduation he joined the BBC's journalist training programme, becoming a researcher for the television programmes Nationwide and Watchdog. After Nationwide's editor Roger Bolton was blocked by Brigadier Ronnie Stonham from hiring Hewlett on a permanent contract, he left to join the newly created Channel 4 in 1983.

At Channel 4 he was a founding producer on the current affairs programmes The Friday Alternative and Diverse Reports, before returning to the BBC in 1987 where he rose through contributing to similar current affairs programmes including Brass Tacks. By 1995, he was editor of the Panorama current affairs documentary series, and was the editor of the series's interview of Diana, Princess of Wales by Martin Bashir.

Passed over to be the next controller of BBC One, he returned to Channel 4 before quickly joining ITV franchise holder Carlton Television as managing director of productions. Made redundant in 2004 after Carlton merged with Granada Television, he took a sabbatical during which he bought a holiday home in St Lucia, before embarking on a portfolio career.

Hewlett was a media-columnist for The Guardian and The Observer. This brought him to the attention of BBC Radio 4's then-controller Mark Damazer, who asked Hewlett to create The Media Show in 2008. In 2011 Hewlett won the BBC's Nick Clarke Award for "the best broadcast interview of the year" for his The Media Show interview with Peta Buscombe, the then chair of the Press Complaints Commission. Probing the PCC's inadequate handling of the phone-hacking scandal, Hewlett's interview is credited with playing a role in ending the career of Buscombe.

Hewlett became chair of Sheffield Doc/Fest in 2004, and was instrumental in the appointment of Heather Croall as Festival Director and chief executive officer, a move that led to it becoming one of the world's best-regarded documentary events, according to Variety. He stepped down as the festival's chair in 2011, but continued to sit on its board of governors.

In 2016 and 2017, Hewlett took part in a series of interviews with Eddie Mair, broadcast as part of BBC Radio 4's PM, in which he described his treatment for cancer of the oesophagus. In the episode broadcast on 6 February 2017 he described marrying his partner Rachel, in a ceremony arranged by the Royal Marsden Hospital within one hour, after being told that he had come to the end of possible treatment. He also wrote a series of columns "My cancer diary" in The Observer.

== Personal life and death ==
Hewlett had three sons by his former partner, Karole Lange. After announcing that his cancer was terminal in early February 2017, he married his then-partner Rachel Crellin, a journalist and executive of Genie Pictures, at the Royal Marsden Hospital.

On 20 February 2017, Hewlett died of oesophageal cancer at the Royal Marsden Hospital whilst listening to Bob Dylan recordings with his family by his side.
