= Nick Clarke =

English journalist (1948–2006)

- Born: Nicholas Campbell Clarke; 9 June 1948; Godalming, Surrey, England
- Died: 23 November 2006 (aged 58)
- Education: Westbourne House School; Bradfield College
- Alma mater: Fitzwilliam College, Cambridge
- Occupations: Radio presenter, television presenter, journalist
- Employer(s): Yorkshire Evening Post; BBC

Nicholas Campbell Clarke (9 June 1948 – 23 November 2006), was an English radio and television presenter and journalist, primarily known for his work on BBC Radio 4.

== Biography ==
Clarke was born in 1948 in Godalming, Surrey, and educated at Westbourne House School, West Sussex, Bradfield College, Berkshire and Fitzwilliam College, Cambridge.

Clarke began his career in newspapers on the Yorkshire Evening Post, before joining the BBC in 1973 as Northern Industrial Correspondent. He then joined The Money Programme and eventually joined Newsnight in 1984. His first major job in radio was on BBC Radio 4's The World This Weekend. He presented Radio 4's lunchtime news programme, The World at One, from 1994 until his death. During the 1991 Gulf War he was a volunteer presenter on the BBC Radio 4 News FM service. He also presented the Round Britain Quiz, the debate series Straw Poll and, when Jonathan Dimbleby was away, Any Questions? Clarke was a reporter for the BBC TV's Look North programme, serving the North of England.

Clarke won the Broadcasting Press Guild broadcaster of the year award in 2001. He wrote a biography of the writer and journalist Alistair Cooke and a social history of Britain in the second half of the 20th century entitled The Shadow of a Nation: How Celebrity Destroyed Britain.

In December 2005, it was announced that Clarke was suffering from cancer, which was eventually revealed to be a sarcoma, and he subsequently had surgery which entailed the loss of his left leg. During this time he documented his experiences with the disease for an audio diary that was broadcast on Radio 4 in June 2006.

Clarke returned to hosting The World at One programme in August 2006, but his last appearance was on 12 September. He died on 23 November 2006.

In 2007, the BBC created the Nick Clarke Award to celebrate and recognise the best broadcast interview of the year, which is awarded annually at the Cheltenham Literature Festival. Following his death, friends from university established the 'Nick Clarke Prize'.

In The Hitchhiker's Guide to the Galaxy, Clarke presented a faux World at One for the Quandary Phase along with Patrick Moore.

== See also ==
- Nick Clarke Award

Media offices
Preceded by James Naughtie	Main presenter: The World at One; 1994–2006	Succeeded by Martha Kearney
