= Hugh Kearney =

British historian

Hugh Francis Kearney (22 January 1924 – 1 October 2017) was a British historian, and Amundson Professor Emeritus of the University of Pittsburgh. He was the author of several articles on early modern economic history, a biography of the 1st Earl of Strafford, and the acclaimed book British Isles: A History of Four Nations, which advocated a multi-national "Britannic" approach, rather than an Anglo-centric approach, to their history, historiography and sociology.

== Career ==
Born in Liverpool, Kearney studied history at Peterhouse, Cambridge in the 1940s. He met his wife while teaching at University College Dublin where she was an undergraduate. Kearney became, in 1962, one of the first academics (a lecturer of history) at the still-under-construction "plate glass university", University of Sussex, where he taught in a temporary Nissen hut before the arts faculty buildings were completed. Kearney went on to teach courses on contemporary Britain; poetry, science and religion in seventeenth century England; religion and literature in the age of Pascal, and the politics and literature of Yeats and Joyce. Kearney made modern Irish history his major research interest, especially focusing on Ireland's relationship with the United Kingdom, and the British nations.

While at Sussex, Kearney spent three months at the Folger Library in Washington D.C., where he wrote an article Puritanism, Capitalism and the Scientific Revolution (published in Past and Present, 1964). During his time at Sussex, he also took a sabbatical in Pittsburgh, Pennsylvania. In 1970, Kearney left Sussex to become Richard Pares Professor of history at the University of Edinburgh, and in 1975 moved on to the University of Pittsburgh, where he was Amundson Professor of British History until 1999.

While at Sussex, Kearney edited Problems and Perspectives in History (a series published by Longmans) in which he contributed the volume Origins of the Scientific Revolution. As result of this, he came to contribute a volume in the new World University Library (Science and Change 1500–1700, Weidenfeld, 1970) that was translated into German, Spanish and Japanese.

In 1969, Kearney contributed three chapters on the 17th century in John Cruikshank's Sussex-based series French Literature and its Background. Kearney further published his work on 17th century universities in Scholars and Gentlemen: Universities and Society in Pre-Industrial Britain (Faber 1970).

A gap of almost 20 years followed before the publication of his later works, The British Isles: A History of Four Nations (1989, 2006) and the collection of essays, Ireland: Contested Ideas of Nationalism and History (2007).

== Works ==
=== The British Isles: A History of Four Nations ===
In 1989, Kearney published The British Isles: A History of Four Nations, to strong reviews in the Times Literary Supplement, History Today, The Spectator and the New York Review of Books. It was printed by Cambridge University Press as a general reader book with plate sections in hardback and paperback, and the Canto edition of 1995, which had an extended bibliography, was reprinted twice. A second edition was published by Cambridge in 2006, which included a new chapter on the nineties and post-devolution Britain.

=== Ireland: Contested Ideas of Nationalism and History ===
In 2007, Kearney cast his "Britannic" perspective on Ireland in a collection of essays published by the New York University Press in the USA, and by Cork University Press in Ireland. According to the NYUP, "Kearney contends that Ireland represents a striking example of the power of nationalism" and offers "his revisionist 'four nations' approach to Irish history."

== Personal life ==
Kearney's daughter is Martha Kearney, a former presenter of Radio 4's The World at One and Today programmes. Kearney's son is Hugh Kearney, a high school history teacher. His other son Peter lives in sheltered housing in Bury St Edmunds.

== In the media ==
In 2006, Kearney reminisced with his daughter about life during the early development of Sussex University, in a BBC Radio 4 series charting the post-war history of higher education.

== Publications ==
- Strafford in Ireland: a Study in Absolutism: Cambridge University Press, 1959, 2nd edition 1989
- Origins of the Scientific Revolution: Longmans, 1967
- Science and Change 1500–1700: Weidenfeld, 1971
- Scholars and Gentlemen: Universities and Society in pre-industrial Britain: Faber, Cornell University Press, 1970
- The British Isles: A History of Four Nations: Cambridge University Press, 1989, 2nd edition 2006
- Ireland: Contested Ideas of Nationalism and History: New York University Press, Cork University Press, 2007
