= Cheltenham Literature Festival =

Annual literary festival in Cheltenham, England

Coordinates: 51.890°N 2.078°W

The Times and The Sunday Times Cheltenham Literature Festival, is an international festival of literature held annually in Cheltenham, England. It is part of Cheltenham Festivals.

The Broadstairs Dickens Festival started in 1927

== Introduction and history ==
Formed in 1949, the Cheltenham Literature Festival is the longest-running festival of its kind in the world. The Festival was founded by the Spa Manager George Wilkinson, in conjunction with the Tewkesbury-based author John Moore, who served as its first director. Actor Ralph Richardson, who was born in Cheltenham, launched the festival, and poet Cecil Day-Lewis, who taught at Cheltenham College, read a selection of contemporary verse. The Festival currently has the national newspapers The Times and Sunday Times as its 'title' sponsors: therefore making the full name of the festival The Times and The Sunday Times Cheltenham Literature Festival. The 2013 Literature Festival issued around 135,000 tickets. The festival also sees the presentation each year of the Nick Clarke Award for best broadcast interview, as well welcoming literary prize winners to discuss their most recent work.

The festival interprets the term "literature" broadly, featuring writers in every genre, including a good number of journalists and politicians.

The 2014 festival took place from Friday till Sunday, October 3–12 and was led by Guest Directors Shami Chakrabarti, Omid Djalili, Amit Chaudhuri, Sophie Hannah and Michael Rosen. In its varied programme of over 500 events, the Festival touched upon subjects as diverse as history, politics, sport, food and fashion. The theme of the 2014 Festival was "Brave New Worlds", which asks big questions such as: Is democracy at risk? Is technology changing our brains? What future for words? What does the next century hold?

The 2015 festival had as its "Big Read", the book To Kill a Mockingbird by Harper Lee. The 2016 festival had as its "Big Read", The Color Purple by Alice Walker.

The 2017 festival had Hillary Clinton interviewed by Mariella Frostrup on her disdain for current US president Donald Trump, WikiLeaks and Brexit voters.

The 2018 festival was held 5–14 October 2018. Highlighted speakers include Michael Parkinson, Prue Leith, William Boyd, Kate Atkinson, John Torode, Pat Barker, and Mary Beard.

The 2019 festival included an appearance by David Cameron.

In August 2026, author Candice Carty-Williams withdrew from the festival, where she had been due to serve as a guest curator, citing objections to its sponsorship by The Times.

== 2026 festival ==
The 2026 festival is scheduled to take place from 9 to 18 October, with more than 500 events featuring authors, journalists and other public figures. The programme includes a tribute to the late author Jilly Cooper and appearances by figures including Mary Berry, Prue Leith, Sandi Toksvig and Greg James.

== Previous guests ==
Described as a "literary lover's dream", the Festival has hosted the talents of some of the world's leading novelists, poets, humorists, historians, philosophers, actors and politicians. Previous guests include:

Kate Adie, Martin Amis, Simon Armitage, Richard Attenborough, John Barrowman, Tony Benn, Brenda Blethyn, Charley Boorman, Gordon Brown, Rory Bremner, Michael Buerk, Melanie C, Tony Curtis, Sophie Dahl, Russell T Davies, Judi Dench, Anne Enright, Rupert Everett, Sebastian Faulks, Dawn French, Stephen Fry, Bob Geldof, Dave Gorman, A. C. Grayling, Richard Hammond, Stephen Hawking, Ian Hislop, Nick Hornby, Armando Iannucci, Clive James, Terry Jones, Naomi Klein, Doris Lessing, Alexander McCall Smith, Frank McCourt, Ian McEwan, Rik Mayall, Ray Mears, Roger Moore, Toni Morrison, Michael Palin, Michael Parkinson, Bruce Parry, Jeremy Paxman, Ian Rankin, Ruth Rendell, Tony Robinson, Salman Rushdie, Alexei Sayle, Simon Schama, Antony Sher, Frank Skinner, Emma Smith, Zadie Smith, Jon Snow, David Starkey, Patrick Stewart, Janet Street-Porter, Mark Thomas, Sandi Toksvig, Laura Ulewicz, and Terry Wogan.

== See also ==
- Cheltenham Prize for Literature
- The Playhouse, Cheltenham
