= Kirsty Lang =

British journalist and broadcaster

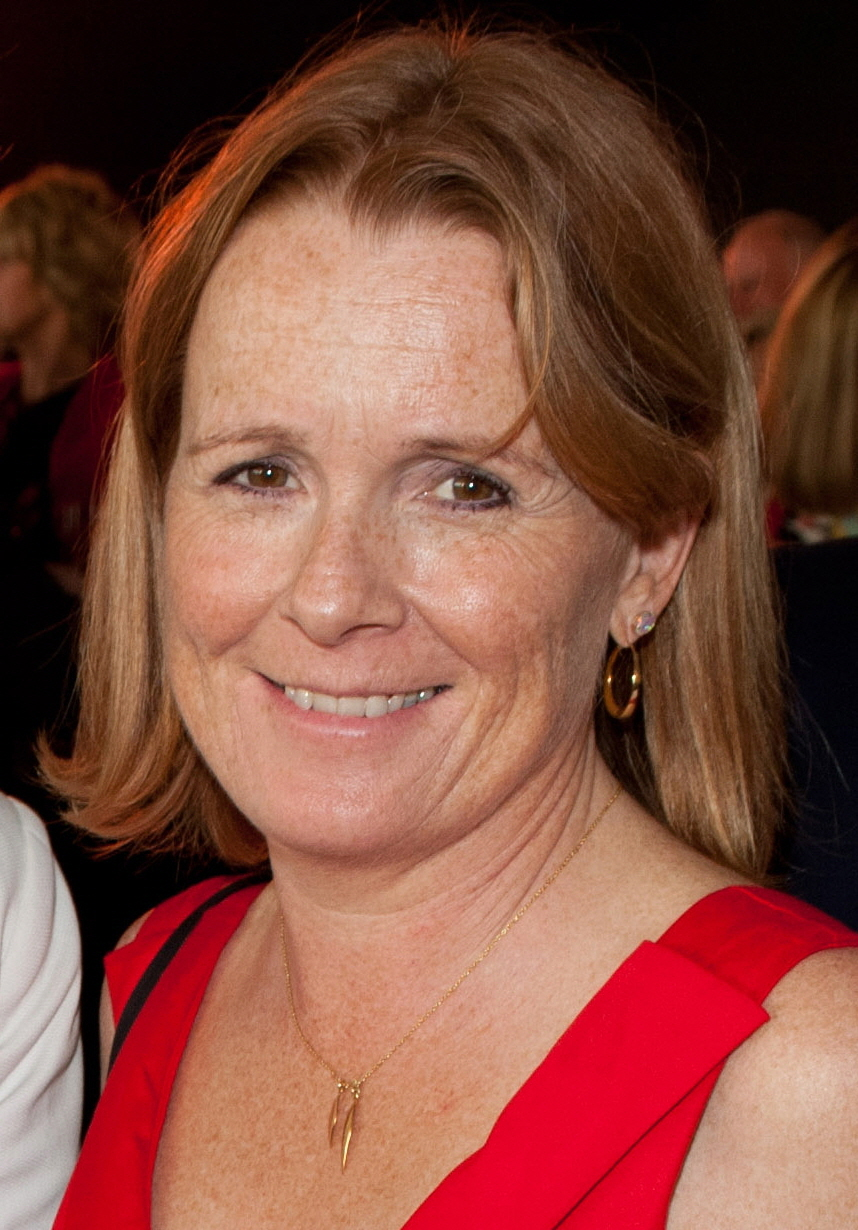
Lang at the Financial Times 125th Anniversary Party, London, in June 2013

Kirsty Lang (born July 1962) is a British journalist and broadcaster who works for BBC Radio and Television. Earlier in her career, she was on the staff of The Sunday Times and Channel 4 News, working as a presenter and reporter.

Lang was a visiting professor at Columbia University in New York for several months at the beginning of 2012. She chairs the Board of the Baltic Centre for Contemporary Art in Gateshead and since 2014 has been on the board of the British Council.

== Career ==
Lang was raised in various parts of the world; her family were evacuated from Nigeria at the time of the Biafran war in 1967. Lang was educated at private schools including Nishimachi International School in Tokyo, Lauriston Girls' School in Melbourne, Dartington Hall School in Devon, England and the International School of Geneva.

She first joined the BBC as a graduate trainee in 1986, having gained an MA in Journalism from City University, London following a degree in International Relations and an MSc in Government and Politics from the London School of Economics. In 1989, she became a Central European correspondent for the BBC World Service and later a reporter on the BBC's Newsnight.

After a spell as Paris correspondent for The Sunday Times, she became a co-presenter/reporter for Channel 4 News (1998–2002). She returned to the BBC when the digital channel BBC Four was established in 2002 and has presented The World, an evening news programme, and its replacement World News Today.

Lang was a regular presenter of a nightly arts and culture programme Radio Four's Front Row from 2004 until autumn 2021. She has also been a stand-in anchor for The World Tonight and other programmes, and has worked on air for the Today programme and The World at One.

From January to April 2012, Lang was a visiting professor at Columbia University, New York City in the School of International and Public Affairs. From 19 November to 23 November 2012, she was one of the two co-presenters of "On the French Fringe", a programme broadcast on BBC Radio Four at 1:45 p.m. about life in France, looking at how cultural forms such as films or cartoons had caught the national psyche in that country. She has been a visiting lecturer at University College London's Department of Anthropology since 2018.

Lang also contributes, on occasion, to publications including The Times, The Guardian and the Radio Times, and was chair of the Orange Prize for Fiction in 2008.

In January 2022, the BBC announced that Lang would be the host of Round Britain Quiz on Radio 4 from 28 March.

== Personal life ==
Lang is married to the journalist and Balkans specialist Misha Glenny with whom she has a son and two stepchildren. They live in Shepherd's Bush, west London. She is, by her own account, "mildly dyslexic".

Lang told the Digital, Culture, Media and Sport Select Committee in March 2018 about her experiences after having to leave her BBC staff contract for freelance status as, for personal reasons, she went part-time. She explained that for financial reasons she had to work immediately after her step-daughter's funeral and through much of a period when she was undergoing treatment for breast cancer as her contract did not allow for sick pay.
