= Hettie Judah =

British art critic, writer and curator

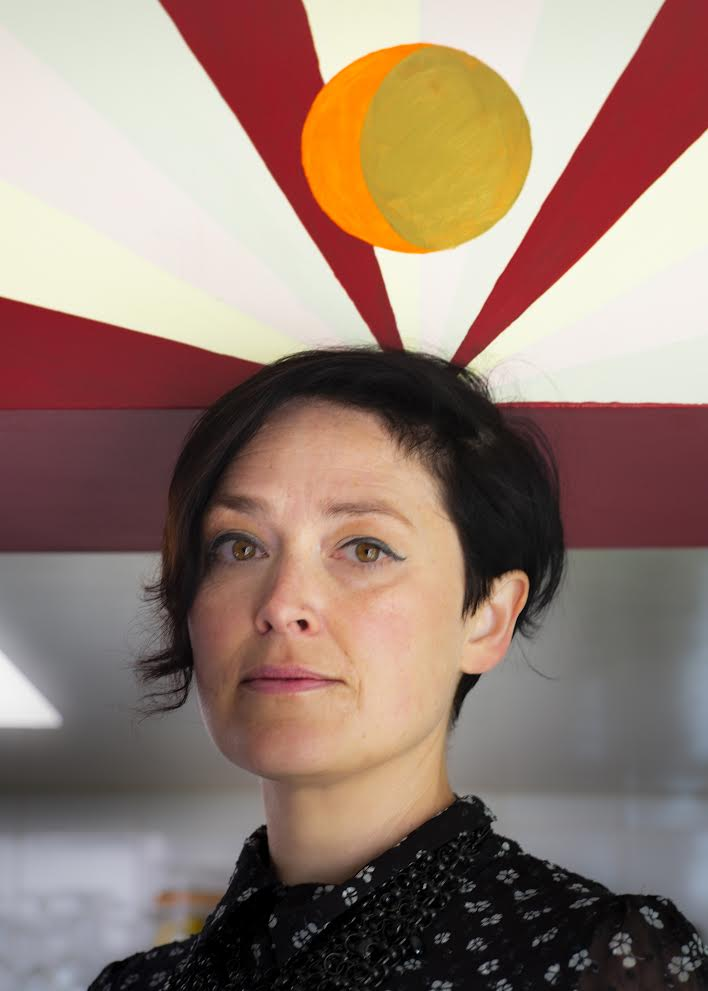
- Education: Glasgow University
- Occupations: Art critic; writer; curator
- Spouse: Jonny Dymond (divorced)
- Children: 2
- Relatives: Tim Judah (cousin); Ben Judah
- Website: www.hettiejudah.co.uk

Hettie Judah is a British art critic, writer with a monthly column in the Apollo. She has also published articles in The Art Newspaper, The Guardian, The Independent, The Times Literary Supplement, Art UK, British Vogue, and Frieze. Judah has also spoken and written about the art world's inaccessibility to parents, especially mothers. In October 2022 Hettie Judah co-founded The Art Working Parents Alliance (AWP) alongside curator Jo Harrison, director of The Approach Gallery, London.

“Just celebrating images of motherhood without questioning the context in which they’re shown or the risks taken by those artists isn’t enough. In the political context of now, that’s especially important.” — Hettie Judah, 2024

== Early life ==
Judah's paternal family are of Baghdadi Jewish heritage via India.

== Career ==
In 2019, Judah began researching how motherhood impacted the careers of artists. She published her results in 2020. In 2021, she worked with a group of artists to put together the publication How Not To Exclude Artist Mothers (and Other Parents).

=== Curations ===
- Curator of the 2024–25 Hayward Gallery touring exhibition Acts of Creation: On Art and Motherhood.

Touring to:
1. Arnolfini, Bristol
2. Midlands Arts Centre (MAC), Birmingham
3. Millennium Gallery, Sheffield
4. Dundee Contemporary Arts
5. VISUAL, Carlow

== Personal life ==
Judah has two adult sons. She lived in the U.S. for a year following the birth of her first son, and then lived in Istanbul for four years, where her second son was born. The family then lived in Brussels, Belgium before returning to London in 2010. She became a single parent when her sons were 7 and 9 years old respectively.

== Bibliography ==
=== Articles ===
- View at The Art Newspaper
- View at The Guardian
- View at The i Paper
- View at The Independent
- View at The Times Literary Supplement
- View at Apollo
- View at Art UK
- View at British Vogue
- View at Frieze

=== Books ===
- —— (5 October 2020). Frida Kahlo. Lives of the Artists. Laurence King Publishing. ISBN 978-1-78627-711-4. OCLC 1140670241.
- —— (25 September 2022). How Not To Exclude Artist Mothers (and Other Parents). Hot Topics in the Art World. Lund Humphries Publishers. ISBN 978-1-84822-612-8.
- —— (4 July 2024). Acts of Creation: On Art and Motherhood. Thames & Hudson. ISBN 978-0-500-02786-8. OCLC 1422225036. With foreword by Brian Cass.
- —— (24 October 2024). The Secret Lives of Stones. John Murray. ISBN 978-1-5293-9495-5. OCLC 1474252671.
