= The Money Programme =

British TV finance and business affairs series (1966–2010)

- Logo as of 2008
- Genre: Finance and business affairs
- Presented by: Max Flint; Libby Potter
- Opening theme: Main Title from The Carpetbaggers
- Country of origin: United Kingdom
- Original language: English

Original release
- Network: BBC2
- Release: 5 April 1966 – 9 November 2010

The Money Programme is a finance and business affairs television programme on BBC Two which ran between April 1966 and November 2010. It was first broadcast on 5 April 1966 and presented by "commentators" (financial journalists) William Davis, Erskine B. Childers and Joe Roeber.

== Production ==
The programme's theme tune was a version of the main title theme from The Carpetbaggers (1964) (which appeared on an album by jazz organist Jimmy Smith). By 1989, the programme was updated with a new theme by George Fenton, but an updated version of the original theme tune was reused again later on.

The programme used a magazine style starting in the 1980s, but changed to a single subject documentary in 2001. More recently, the programme has formed a partnership with the Open University Business School. The Open University provides input into programmes and supplementary materials written by OU Business School academics.

On 1 June 2007, an episode of the Money Programme called "Virtual World / Real Millions" became the first full BBC programme to have been broadcast inside the virtual world Second Life. That episode featured an interview with Second Life founder and CEO Philip Rosedale amongst others.

== Presenters ==
- Max Flint
- Libby Potter

=== Former presenters ===
- James Bellini
- Michael Charlton
- Erskine B. Childers
- Adrian Chiles
- Nick Clarke
- Rajan Datar
- William Davis
- Maya Even
- Peter Hobday
- Peter Jay
- Donald MacCormick
- Michael Robinson
- Joe Roeber
- Valerie Singleton
- Hugh Stephenson
- Alan Watson
- Brian Widlake

== Interviewees ==
- Jeff Bezos
- Lord Black of Crossharbour
- Tony Blair
- Michael Bloomberg
- Sir Richard Branson
- Lord Browne of Madingley
- Shiatzy Chen
- Michael Dell
- Michael Eisner
- Larry Ellison
- Sir Rocco Forte
- Bill Gates
- Sir Chris Gent
- Sir James Goldsmith
- Sir Philip Green
- Sir Stelios Haji-Ioannou
- Robert Maxwell
- Alexander McQueen
- Lakshmi Mittal
- Rupert Murdoch
- Peter Oakley
- Bernd Pischetsrieder
- Sir Paul Smith
- George Soros
- Sir Alan Sugar
- Björn Ulvaeus
