= Maya Even =

Canadian journalist (born 1956)

Maya Even (born June 1956), is a Canadian-born, British-based, university lecturer, journalist and television presenter.

== Biography ==
Born in Canada, and educated at McGill University, Montreal, and St Antony's College, University of Oxford where she first arrived in 1979 and completed a doctoral thesis entitled The Evolution of Political Television and its Influence on Election Campaigning in Britain.

After a period as a university lecturer, Even began her television career at TV-am in 1987, first as a researcher in the political unit and then as a producer and reporter from 1989, mainly from Westminster. In 1990, she took over from Richard Keys as regular host of the early show and began deputising for Lorraine Kelly on Good Morning Britain. She also fronted the revamped First Report and covered for David Frost with Even on Sunday, which ranged across politics, the arts and sport.

In 1993, she joined Channel 4 to present the lunchtime daily political programme House to House, and in 1997 moved to BBC Two to present The Money Programme for two years.

Even is a governor and former vice chair of the South Bank Centre, and was a member of the Mayor's Cultural Strategy Group for Mayor of London Ken Livingstone. Even was nominated by Livingstone as the Greater London Authority representative for the London Museums Agency.

Even is married to Italian-born London based art dealer Edmondo di Robilant; the couple has one child. Their home featured in Robb Report magazine.
