= Celebdaq =

Online celebrity stock exchange by the BBC

The Celebdaq logo

Celebdaq was an online "celebrity stock exchange" game on the BBC's website. The game had its own television show on BBC Three. The television show was presented by Paddy O'Connell and Libby Potter until comedian Jenny Eclair became the presenter.

Players were given the opportunity to buy and sell shares in celebrities using £10,000 of virtual cash. As in real-life stock markets, the trading of shares caused each celebrity's share price to fluctuate, allowing profits to be realised. Weekly dividends were paid on shares owned based upon how much press coverage the celebrity received in a number of daily newspapers and magazines. There was also a version specifically concentrating on sportspeople, called Sportdaq.

== History ==
Celebdaq was launched on the BBC website in July 2002. It was based on other very similar games: Popex.com, which had been "trading" in musicians since 1998, and Hollywood Stock Exchange. The Celebdaq code was a port of the Popex code, with some additions. The website consciously imitated the financial setting of the Stock Exchange with share prices fluctuating continuously around the clock.

After a slow start and a number of rule changes to prevent cheating, the game rapidly gained popularity and a weekly prize for "Top Trader" was instigated consisting of £100 in cash along with a stripy jacket replicating those worn by traders on the floor of the stock exchange. The prize was later changed to a selection of merchandise.

The site was used to promote the new BBC Three digital channel which opened the following year, and Patrick (Paddy) O'Connell, a former business correspondent and real-life stock exchange expert, was engaged as presenter of the tie-in BBC Three TV shows. These shows were broadcast from 14 February 2003 to 18 March 2004.

In 2004, Celebdaq was chosen as the best entertainment site on the internet at the Interactive Bafta awards.

Until 2005, the BBC also provided online message boards for traders to discuss strategy and post tips for the coming week. Following an incident in which a footballer who had taken out an injunction preventing publication of a story was named on the site, the BBC tightened editorial controls and shortly afterwards the official Celebdaq message boards were scrapped altogether. Several MSN Groups were formed, where experienced players and former top traders posted their weekly tips thread, but these ended along with MSN Groups in 2009.

On January 7, 2010, the BBC announced the creation of a new Celebdaq game. The two games ran in tandem, with the new game created by Monterosa, running in beta. Although it was possible to upgrade an account, it was not possible to carry on trading shares that were already owned.

=== Site closure ===
Celebdaq and its sister website Sportdaq were both closed on Friday 26 February 2010 as part of a series of cuts to the BBC's online services. The BBC stated that its online operation needed a "new, harder focus on quality and distinctiveness".

=== Revival ===
Celebdaq was re-established and relaunched by a fan of the original game at the end of December 2018 and ran until 2024. Traders were able to buy and sell stocks in celebrities and receive dividends and increases to their portfolio value based on their stocks' performances. The revamped incarnation was far more dynamic than the original and share prices change daily through media exposure. Additional features such as stock having a "life span" after which it becomes worthless were also present. Traders were also given the ability to purchase "trophies" to showcase traders' financial status in the game.

== Weekly events ==
=== Millionaire Day ===
Everyone who had a portfolio worth over a million pounds was "kneecapped". In the early hours of Monday morning, traders who were worth over a million pounds had their portfolio emptied, and exchanged for a status symbol, depending on how much they had. See Kneecapping and Status Symbols. Traders who had their portfolio emptied were given £10,000 to keep on playing.

=== Top Trader ===
For a time the person who made the most profit in percentage terms during the previous 7 days won Celebdaq merchandise. The winner has often made 20+ fold increase. After 1 August 2007 the "Top Trader" competition was suspended.

=== Diary Day ===
A list of upcoming celebrity events during the following week was put on the website. This was used as a guide to who is likely to get dividends.

=== Dividend Friday ===
The dividends accumulated during the last 7 days were handed out. The dividend received depended on how long the owner had the share. Only shares that were owned from Monday till Friday receive the full dividend.

== Kneecapping and Status Symbols ==
Kneecapping occurred when someone accumulated over £1 million. They had all their money and shares taken off them and given a fresh £10,000. This prevented people from controlling the market when they acquired large amounts of cash. To compensate them they were given status symbols to replace the number of millions they had.

- £1 million: Fat Wad of Cash
- £5 million: Sexy Car
- £10 million: Luxury Yacht
- £25 million: Very Big House in the Country
- £50 million: Executive Jet
- £100 million: Exotic Island
- £500 million: Crown of a Minor Nation State
- £1 billion: You Become Bill Gates
