= Gordon Clough =

English radio presenter and journalist

Arthur Gordon Clough (26 August 1934, Salford, Lancashire – 6 April 1996, London), was an English radio presenter and journalist, primarily known for his work on BBC Radio 4.

== Early life ==
Clough was educated at Bolton School and Magdalen College, Oxford, where he read French and Russian.

He spent his national service monitoring Soviet radio traffic in the Baltic Sea, and joined the BBC Russian Service. He was banned from entering the Soviet Union as an alleged former spy.

== Career ==
In 1968 he entered domestic journalism and then studio presentation, working on The World This Weekend, PM and The World at One. Aided by his fluency in Russian, he moved back to front-line journalism at the time of Mikhail Gorbachev's reforms, making a series of award-winning documentary programmes.

Clough also covered South Africa months after the release of Nelson Mandela, and for a season he presented EuroFile, a magazine programme on BBC Radio 4 concerning European affairs.

He was a question-setter for, and the presenter of, Round Britain Quiz.

== Personal life ==
Clough was married to Carolyn Stafford. They divorced in 1991 but later remarried.
