= Tom Sutcliffe (broadcaster) =

British journalist and arts broadcaster (born 1956)

- Born: 12 August 1956 (age 70)
- Education: Emmanuel College, Cambridge
- Occupations: Journalist and arts broadcaster
- Awards: Peter Black Award for Broadcast Journalism

Thomas Sutcliffe (born 12 August 1956 in Yorkshire, England) is a British journalist and arts broadcaster. He is one of the main presenters of the BBC Radio 4 shows Front Row and Start the Week. He also presented the Radio 4 arts show Saturday Review from 1999, and until 2022 was chairman of Round Britain Quiz.

== Early life and education ==
Sutcliffe was educated at Lancaster Royal Grammar School and studied English at Emmanuel College, Cambridge.

== Career ==
Sutcliffe joined the BBC in 1979 when he graduated from university. After editing the BBC Radio 4 arts programme Kaleidoscope, in 1986 he became the first arts editor of The Independent newspaper, a columnist and television reviewer.

Sutcliffe presented the BBC Radio 4 arts show Saturday Review from 1999 until it was scrapped in 2021. He was chairman of Round Britain Quiz until 2022.

== Awards ==
In 1995, Sutcliffe won the Peter Black Award for Broadcast Journalism. He is a fellow of the Royal Society of Literature.
