= Matt Frei =

British television news journalist and writer

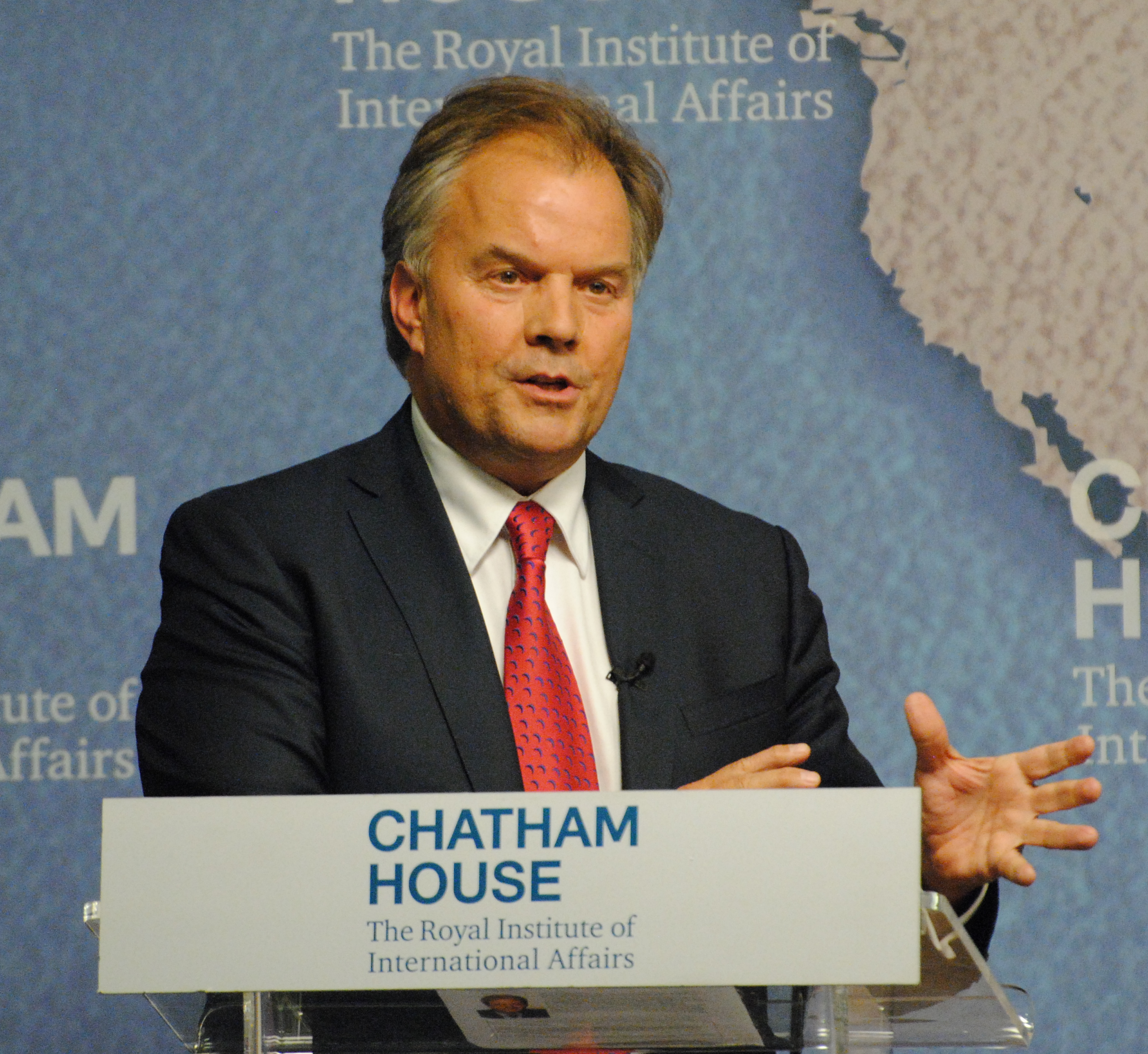
- Frei in 2015
- Born: Matthias Frei; 26 November 1963 (age 62); Essen, North Rhine-Westphalia, West Germany
- Other name: Matt Frei
- Education: Westminster School; St Peter's College, Oxford
- Occupations: Journalist, newsreader, news anchor, author
- Notable credit(s): BBC News, Channel 4 (ITN)
- Spouse: Penny Quested (m. 1996)
- Children: 4

Matthias "Matt" Frei (born 26 November 1963) is a British-German television news journalist and writer, formerly the Washington, D.C. correspondent for Channel 4 News. As of 2024 he is the channel's Europe editor and a presenter of the main Channel 4 News at 7pm.

== Early life ==
Frei was born in 1963 in Essen, West Germany, his parents having settled there after leaving Silesia before it became part of Poland. In 1973 the family moved to the United Kingdom, where Frei's father became a London correspondent for radio broadcaster Deutschlandfunk.

Frei was educated at Westminster School, then read history and Spanish at St Peter's College, University of Oxford, graduating in 1986.

== Career ==
=== BBC ===
Frei joined the BBC and spent a year in the German section of the World Service, before he moved to English language current affairs, where he worked for another year.

In 1989, working as a stringer, he reported on the First Intifada in Jerusalem, then on the Persian Gulf War as London foreign affairs correspondent. He took up the post of Bonn correspondent in Germany on the same day as the fall of the Berlin Wall.

In 1990, Frei took a holiday in Zimbabwe and persuaded aid worker friend Katty Kay to become a journalist.

From 1992 to 1996, he worked as a Southern Europe correspondent, based in Rome, and covered events in Bosnia, Kosovo, North Africa and various Mafia-related stories.

After working as a Southern Europe correspondent, he worked as an Asia correspondent from 1997 to 2003, based in Hong Kong (taking up his post just before the handover to China) and later in Singapore.

From 2002, he was the BBC's Washington, DC correspondent. In 2005, Frei reported from the centre of New Orleans in the aftermath of Hurricane Katrina. On 1 October 2007, Frei became the first presenter of the BBC World News one-hour Washington-based news broadcast, BBC World News America, supported by correspondent Katty Kay.

For a week in July 2008, Frei presented the London-based BBC News at Six on a relief basis. A year later on 27 July 2009, Frei returned to London again to present the evening bulletin (again as a relief presenter). In January 2011, Frei presented the BBC's Newsnight as a relief presenter.

Frei presented his own BBC documentary on the life and times of the German capital, Berlin. It ran from 14 November 2009.

As part of his brief as the BBC's Washington correspondent, Frei presented a weekly Radio 4 programme titled Americana, which offers listeners slices of life in all of the country's 50 states, and political news from Washington. Frei's last Americana episode was broadcast in May 2011.

=== Channel 4 ===
It was announced in May 2011 that Frei would be switching from the BBC to Channel 4 later in the year. Frei would serve as the broadcaster's Washington correspondent for Channel 4 News, as well as reporting for the channel's other news programmes. He has since returned often from Washington and has become a semi-regular presenter on Channel 4's evening news slot.

In October 2012, Frei headed Channel 4's coverage of the US presidential election, including making a documentary, The American Road Trip: Obama's story, in which he visited middle-class voters in communities in the mid-west, including Minneapolis, Northwood, Ohio and Gary, Indiana.

=== LBC ===
On 24 September 2016, he started presenting the 10:00 am show, on occasional Saturdays, on LBC radio. In the prelude to the 2022 Russian invasion of Ukraine Frei reported from Kyiv, Ukraine.

== Awards ==
- International Emmy Award for Best News, for Channel 4 News reports, 'Hong Kong: Year of Living Dangerously', (2020)
- RTS Journalist of the Year (2015 and 2017)
- Voice of the Listener & Viewer Award (2018)
- Dupont Award for 2010 Haiti earthquake (2011)
- Royal Television Society International News Award (2000)
- Prix Bayeux Award for War Reporting (2000)
- Peabody Award for BBC World News America (2010)
- Amnesty International Asia Award, for Newsnight features on Vietnam and Indonesia (1997 and 1998)

== Books ==
- Italy: The Unfinished Revolution (1995). Sinclair-Stevenson. ISBN 978-1-85619-571-3.
- Only in America (2008). HarperCollins Publishers Limited. ISBN 978-0-00-724892-6.

== Personal life ==
Frei lives in Wandsworth, London. He has been married to artist Penny Quested since 1996 and the couple have four children. He is a member of the Garrick Club.
