= Sportdaq =

Sportdaq was the web-based sister game to the BBC's Celebdaq. Sportdaq started during August 2004. Players buy and sell shares in sport stars using £10,000 of virtual cash that they are given to play with. Each week players of the game are given dividends for the shares they own based on how much press coverage the sport stars they hold shares in got that week in a number of London-based daily newspaper sport sections, web sites and BBC Radio 5 Live news reports. Additionally, money can be made throughout the week by correctly predicting the outcome of selected sporting events, known as Win Bonuses paid at £1 per share held at the win bonus deadline. Sportdaq and its sister website Celebdaq were both closed on 26 February 2010, as part of a series of cuts to the BBC's online services.

Relaunch
In 2021 the creator of the new CelebDAQ announced plans to recreate SportDAQ with similar ideas to the original.

== Weekly events ==
Millionaires Day - Saturday
Everyone who has a portfolio worth over £2 million gets 'kneecapped'. Sport stars are listed and sometimes delisted according to a traders vote.

Top Trader - Tuesday
The person who has made the most profit in percentage terms in accordance with the rules during the last 7 days.

Dividend Thursday
The dividends earned during the previous 2 days are handed out after midnight UK time.

== Kneecapping and status symbols ==
When a player accumulates over £2 million, all of his or her money and shares are taken away and replaced with a fresh £10,000. This prevents people from controlling the market when they acquire large amounts of cash. As compensation they are given status symbols to replace the number of millions they had.

- £1 million: fat wad of cash
- £5 million: sexy car
- £10 million: luxury yacht
- £25 million: very big house in the country
- £50 million: executive jet
- £100 million: exotic island
- £500 million: crown of a minor nation state
- £1 billion: you become Roman Abramovich (the only difference to Celebdaq with regard to status symbols)

The first player to break the £1 billion mark and win a Roman Abramovich icon did so in February 2007.
