= On Royalty =

2006 book by Jeremy Paxman

On Royalty: A Very Polite Inquiry into Some Strangely Related Families
- First edition (UK)
- Author: Jeremy Paxman
- Language: English
- Publisher: Viking Press (UK)
- Publication date: Oct 31 2006
- Publication place: United Kingdom
- Media type: Print (Hardback)
- ISBN: 1-58648-491-5
- OCLC: 85813855
- Dewey Decimal: 941.009/9 22
- LC Class: DA28.1 .P38 2007

On Royalty: A Very Polite Inquiry into Some Strangely Related Families is a 2006 book by Jeremy Paxman that examines the ways in which the British Monarchy continues to hold to the public imagination.
