= St Paul's Prep School =

St Paul's Prep School (formerly Colet Court and St Paul's Juniors)

Location
- Barnes, London, SW13 9JT; England
- 51.4874°N 0.2383°W

Information
- Type: Private preparatory day school
- Established: 1881
- Headmaster: Oliver Snowball
- Staff: c.45
- Gender: Boys
- Age: 7 to 13
- Enrolment: c.510
- Houses: Ash, Beech, Oak, Thorn
- Colours: Black and White
- Website: http://www.stpaulsschool.org.uk/

St Paul's Prep School (formerly Colet Court, and then St Paul's Juniors) is a private preparatory school for boys aged 7 to 13 in Barnes, London. It forms the preparatory department of St Paul's School, to which most of its leavers progress.

The school was founded in 1881. It was named Colet Court in 1892, renamed St Paul's Juniors on 1 September 2016 and renamed St Paul's Prep School in January 2026.

== History ==
The school was founded as Bewsher's in 1881 by Samuel Bewsher, an Assistant Master of St Paul's School and secretary to the High Master. It started with six pupils in the basement of Bewsher's own home in Edith Road, West Kensington.

=== Colet Court ===
In 1883, Bewsher's preparatory school was incorporated into the St Paul's School foundation. In 1884, St Paul's School moved from the City of London to a new building in Hammersmith. In 1890, Bewsher's followed, moving to a red brick and terracotta building at 100 Hammersmith Road, opposite the new senior school. Renamed Colet Court in honour of John Colet, the founder of St Paul's School, the new preparatory school had more than three hundred boys.

In the 1970s, following the relocation of St Paul's School and its preparatory school to Barnes, the old Colet Court buildings became the production base of the Euston Films subsidiary of Thames Television, with standing sets for shows like The Sweeney constructed in the former gymnasium. The main building survives, and is Grade II listed. It is now occupied by offices.

=== Barnes ===
In 1968, Colet Court and St Paul's School both moved to their present 45-acre (180,000 m^{2}) site next to the river Thames at Barnes. Colet Court was renamed St Paul's Juniors in September 2016. A redevelopment of the school was completed in January 2026, which was also when the school adopted its current name.

=== Operation Winthorpe ===
The school was investigated by the Metropolitan Police for historic crimes of paedophilia, under the operational name Operation Winthorpe. The school has entirely reviewed and majorly revised its safeguarding procedures since. A major independent report published in January 2020 revealed 80 complaints against 32 members of staff over a period of six decades, mainly from the 1960s to the 1990s. There were 28 recommendations on how current practice could be improved.

== The present school ==
The school now forms part of a single campus on the Barnes site. St Paul's Prep School and St Paul's School, whilst housed separately, share many facilities, such as the lunch hall, sports centre, swimming pool and some sports fields.

St Paul's Prep School is an all-boys school and teaches pupils from age 7 to age 13. Entry is by examination at age 7, age 8 and age 11. There are currently about 445 pupils, who are all day boys. The current head is Oliver Snowball, formerly the headmaster of Eaton House the Manor Girls' School.

The Tatler Schools Guide says of the school: "These may well be the cleverest boys in the capital, on track for St Paul's (20 SPS scholarships last year, as well as two to Westminster and one apiece to Eton and Marlborough), but they wear it lightly."

== Joseph and the Amazing Technicolor Dreamcoat ==
Joseph and the Amazing Technicolor Dreamcoat, by Andrew Lloyd Webber and Tim Rice, was originally commissioned for and performed by the boys (both orchestra and singers) of Colet Court. The first performance in its original form as a 15-minute "pop cantata" took place in the Old Assembly Hall of Colet Court in Hammersmith on 1 March 1968. The second performance, also involving Colet Court boys, was on 12 May 1968 at Central Hall, Westminster. This was picked up by a reviewer for the Sunday Times. The third performance, of a now expanded version, was at St Paul's Cathedral on 9 November 1968. The first recording of the piece, featuring the Colet Court choir, was released by Decca Records in 1969, and remained in the US charts for three months. Joseph was subsequently performed commercially all over the world and re-recorded on disc and on video. It has been performed again at Colet Court as the annual school play several times, most recently in 2004.

== Headmasters ==
Name	Years as Headmaster
J. Bewsher	1887–1929
L. C. Smith	1929–1933
A. N. Evans	1934–1944
H. A. Clutton Brock	1944–1946
J. E. L. Pepys	1946–1955
L. F. Robinson	1955–1956
H. J. G. Collis	1957–1973
W. N. J. Howard	1973–1992
G. J. Thompson	1992–2007
Tim A. Meunier	2007–2016
Maxine Shaw	2016–2022
Oliver Snowball	2022–Current

== Notable alumni ==
- Philip "Tubby" Clayton
- David W. Doyle
- Dominic Grieve, barrister and politician
- Kwasi Kwarteng, politician
- Compton Mackenzie, author
- George Osborne, politician
- Marius Ostrowski
- Nicholas Parsons, entertainer
- Eddie Redmayne, actor
- Nathaniel Rothschild, financier
- Ernest Shepard, artist
- Lister Sinclair, broadcaster and playwright
- William Temple
- Ed Vaizey
- Brian Widlake
- Francis Wright

== See also ==
- St Paul's School, London
