= Caroline Wyatt =

Australian-born English journalist

Caroline Wyatt (born 21 April 1967) is an Australian-born English journalist. She presents the Saturday edition of PM on BBC Radio 4. She has worked as a BBC News journalist for over 25 years, as defence correspondent until August 2014, when she replaced Robert Pigott as religious affairs correspondent until June 2016, when she revealed that she had been diagnosed with multiple sclerosis.

== Early life ==
Born in Darlinghurst, a suburb of Sydney, to an Anglo-Irish father and a Polish mother, Wyatt was adopted by a British diplomat, and his Swiss-born wife. She has two brothers.

Wyatt was educated at the independent Convent of the Sacred Heart School in Woldingham, Surrey, and then studied English and German at Southampton University, which also included six months of study at Rutgers, the State University of New Jersey at the New Brunswick, New Jersey campus in the US. After graduating from Southampton, she studied for a post-graduate diploma in print journalism at City University, London.

== Career ==
Wyatt joined the BBC in 1991 as a news and current affairs trainee. She undertook work for Newsroom South East and the local station in Birmingham.

On completion of her training, she was based in Germany between 1993 and 2000, first as the business reporter, then Berlin correspondent in the reunified German capital at the time of the withdrawal of both Russian and British occupation armies from divided Berlin and the 50th Anniversary of the liberation of the Auschwitz concentration camp, where she found out that her grandfather had been held prisoner during World War II. Wyatt then became the Bonn correspondent on the Rhine River (in the former capital of West Germany). She was then the BBC's Moscow correspondent in Russia until 2003, when she became the network's main reporter in Paris, France.

In October 2007, Wyatt became the BBC defence correspondent.

=== War reporting ===
Wyatt reported from Baghdad during the December 1998, American bombing campaign of Iraq. She covered the 1999 Kosovo conflict in the Balkans peninsula of south eastern Europe, from both Kosovo and neighboring Albania. Following the September 11 attacks on the United States in 2001, she reported on the U.S. Invasion of Afghanistan during 2001–2002, from the military headquarters of the Afghan Northern Alliance. She also covered the invasion and subsequent Iraq War (Second Persian Gulf War) in the spring of 2003 as an "embedded journalist" with the British Army troops in and around Basra. In 2003 she reported from Paris.

Wyatt chaired the selection jury of the 2008 "Bayeux-Calvados Awards" for war correspondents.

=== Radio presenting ===
Wyatt has presented for BBC Radio on the Radio 4 network programmes The World Tonight, From Our Own Correspondent and the Saturday edition of PM (of which she is currently the regular presenter), as well as Europe Today, Newshour and Outlook on the BBC World Service. She has also co-presented Euronews on the BBC Radio 5 Live network.

== Personal life ==
In June 2016, it was announced that Wyatt had been diagnosed with multiple sclerosis. She would remain with the BBC, but in a studio-based role within radio. In January 2017, Wyatt travelled to Mexico for experimental treatment of her illness, involving a stem-cell transplant.
