= Round Britain Quiz =

British BBC Radio 4 panel game (since 1947)

- Other names: RBQ
- Genre: Panel show; General knowledge quiz
- Running time: 30 mins
- Country of origin: United Kingdom
- Language: English
- Home station: BBC Radio 4
- Hosted by: Kirsty Lang (2022–present)
- Produced by: Paul Bajoria
- Original release: 2 November 1947
- Opening theme: Tangled by Philip Guyler
- Website: www.bbc.co.uk/programmes/b007qxpr
- Podcast: www.bbc.co.uk/programmes/p02nrw21/episodes/downloads

Round Britain Quiz (RBQ) is a panel game that has been broadcast on BBC Radio since 1947, making it the oldest quiz still broadcast on British radio. It was based on a format called Transatlantic Quiz, a contest between American and British teams on which Alistair Cooke was an early participant.

The format of the quiz is that teams from various regions around the United Kingdom play in a tournament of head-to-head battles. In a half-hour programme, each team is given four multi-part cryptic questions, each worth up to six points, to be awarded on the host's judgement. The parts of the question are generally centred on a common theme, and a degree of lateral thinking is necessary to score full marks.

One question for each team has a music or sound component, and at least one other is submitted by listeners. Points are awarded to each team by the host. Team members may ask questions, to narrow the field; but the more they ask, or the more clues the host supplies to assist them, the fewer marks the team will score.

Until 1995, there was a "resident London team" which was challenged by teams from other parts of the UK (and sometimes Ireland). There were two hosts, one with each team. In the 1950s, the hosts were Gilbert Harding and Lionel Hale. Later hosts, in various combinations, included Roy Plomley, Jack Longland, Anthony Quinton, Louis Allen, and Gordon Clough.

The programme was formally taken out of production after the death of Gordon Clough in 1996, but was revived a year later with a single chairman and a new format of six teams playing four matches each. From 1997 it was hosted by broadcaster Nick Clarke until his death in 2006. He was succeeded at the start of the 2007 series by Tom Sutcliffe. Kirsty Lang took over hosting in March 2022.

Regional contestants have included Irene Thomas, John Julius Norwich, Fred Housego, Polly Devlin, Brian J. Ford, Antonia Fraser, Patrick Hannan, Patrick Nuttgens and Philippa Gregory. Current contestants include Marcus Berkmann, Cariad Lloyd, Jenny Ryan, Stuart Maconie, Val McDermid, Paul Sinha, Stephen Maddock and Frankie Fanko.

The original theme tune was Radioscopie by Georges Delerue and then, until the end of the 2023 series, Scherzo and Trio performed by the Penguin Cafe Orchestra. For the 2024 series the theme tune is the library music track "Tangled" by Philip Guyler.

Puzzles like those in Round Britain Quiz (a series of cryptic clues linked by a common theme) have appeared in written form in publications such as BBC MindGames Magazine.
