= Front Row (radio programme) =

BBC Radio 4 arts programme

- Country of origin: UK
- Language: English
- Home station: BBC Radio 4
- Hosted by: Samira Ahmed, Tom Sutcliffe and Kirsty Wark
- Original release: 1998
- Website: bbc.co.uk/programmes/b006qsq5

Front Row is a radio programme on BBC Radio 4 that has been broadcast regularly since 1998. The BBC describes the programme as a "live magazine programme on the world of arts, literature, film, media and music". It is broadcast each weekday between 7:15 pm and 8 pm, and has a podcast available for download. Podcasts consisted of weekly highlights until September 2011, but have been full daily episodes since. Shows usually include a mix of interviews, reviews, previews, discussions, reports and columns. Some episodes however, particularly on bank holidays, include a single interview with prominent figures in the arts or a half-hour-long feature on a single subject.

== Details ==
Front Row has been broadcast since 1998. It developed out of BBC Radio 4's previous daily arts programme Kaleidoscope, which ran from 1973 to 1998.

The programme's presenters include Tom Sutcliffe, Samira Ahmed, John Wilson, and Kirsty Lang. Former presenters include Stig Abell, Francine Stock (1998–?) and Mark Lawson (1998–2014).

In 2013, Tracey Emin presented, for a brief while, a series on the programme where people discussed their favourite piece of art work. A total of 75 creative minds appeared on the programme and talked about their favourite piece of art work, which they all felt had particularly inspired them. This feature was called "Cultural Exchange" and for the first night of the feature (22 April 2013) Emin herself appeared on the programme and said that her favourite piece of art work would be a painting by Vermeer. Other people on the Cultural Exchange have included Justin Welby, Archbishop of Canterbury, who selected The War Requiem by Benjamin Britten; Nicholas Hytner, Director General of the National Theatre, who chose Mozart's opera The Magic Flute; historian Antonia Fraser, who selected the painting The Fighting Temeraire by J. M. W. Turner; novelist Sarah Hall, who selected the film Blade Runner; the author Mark Haddon, who chose The Uffington White Horse; and pianist Stephen Hough, who selected a piece of music by Franz Schubert called "The Hurdy Gurdy Man".

The first writer to be interviewed on the programme was Beryl Bainbridge.

Front Row has also covered popular media topics, among them Buffy the Vampire Slayer covered by Neil Gaiman and Joss Whedon in December 2013.

Since 23 September 2017, a television version – entitled Front Row Late and billed as a "live arts and cultural debate programme" – has been broadcast on BBC Two, in two series per year of about eight editions each. The first series of 30-minute programmes was scheduled for transmission on Saturday evenings (normally at 19:30); subsequent series have gone out on Friday nights at 23:05 (after Newsnight). In 2019 the number of editions in each series was cut back to six but the programme's running-time was extended to 40 minutes per edition.
