= Libby Potter =

British reporter

Libby Potter is a British reporter best known for her appearances on BBC Three and BBC Two's The Money Programme.

== Biography ==
After gaining a degree in English literature from St John's College, Cambridge, Potter's media career began in the BBC's New York City news bureau, reviewing US film releases for BBC News 24. After a time teaching English in Prague, she moved to BBC Three, presenting entertainment news programme Liquid News, and then 60 Seconds and the main BBC Three News. Subsequently, in a move away from reporting, she presented the celebrity stock market show Celebdaq and hosted a behind the scenes show about BBC spy series, Spooks.

As a business and consumer affairs specialist, she fronted two presenter-led documentaries for BBC Three's Outrageous Fortunes series, reporting from Japan, Hawaii, Dubai, South Africa, and the US.

In 2006 she was appointed joint presenter of BBC Two's forty-year-old Money Programme.

Outside of the BBC, Potter has worked as an entertainment news reporter for The Sunday Times, The Month DVD, Channel 4, Channel Five, freelanced for Channel 4 News and Euronews and made a series of short films for the charity Christian Aid.
