= Berlin (British TV series) =

2009 documentary series

- DVD cover
- Genre: Documentary
- Presented by: Matt Frei
- Composer: Paul Moessl
- Country of origin: United Kingdom
- Original language: English
- No. of seasons: 1
- No. of episodes: 3

Production
- Executive producer: Basil Comely
- Producers: Sam Hobkinson, David Vincent
- Running time: 60 minutes

Original release
- Network: BBC Two
- Release: 14 November – 28 November 2009

Berlin is a 2009 documentary series codeveloped by the BBC and the Open University. Written and presented by Matt Frei, its three 60-minute episodes each deal with a different historical aspect of Germany's capital city.

== Episodes ==
=== Episode 1 – "Dangerous Ideas" ===
Using the life and posthumous legacy of Frederick the Great as its central theme, this episode covers some of the most notable political, social and cultural movements to emerge within Berlin over the past two centuries.

=== Episode 2 – "Ruined Visions" ===
From the advent of the former Berliner Stadtschloss to the Palast der Republik which for a time took its place, from the creation of the Bauakademie to that of the Olympic Stadium, and from the rise of the Fernsehturm to the rejuvenation of the Reichstag, this episode looks at the varied periods of construction, destruction and renewal seen in the architecture of the city of Berlin.

=== Episode 3 – "Ich bin ein Berliner" ===
Turning to look at the legacy which history has placed upon the people of Berlin – and that which Berliners themselves have offered in turn – this episode charts the tumultuous eras which the city has endured, for good or ill, through the course of the 19th and 20th centuries.

== Reception ==
Berlin booklet cover

Approximately one million people are reported to have watched the broadcasts of parts 2 and 3 on BBC2 in the UK.

Part 1 was noted in The Times as having "brilliant" writing, but was criticized for following a pattern seen in other documentaries, in which presenters would "increasingly want to wear their credentials on their sleeves." The History News Network review posits that "So, Frei certainly hits a chord when he says at the outset “The story of Berlin is one of a clash of ideas that would shape the modern world.”"

== Merchandise ==
A 1-disc Region 2 DVD (BBCDVD3039) was released on 30 November 2009, which features all three full-length episodes. An accompanying booklet was made available by the Open University. The bilingual (in English and German) guide is free to order within the United Kingdom or the Republic of Ireland.
