= Westbourne House School =

British independent school

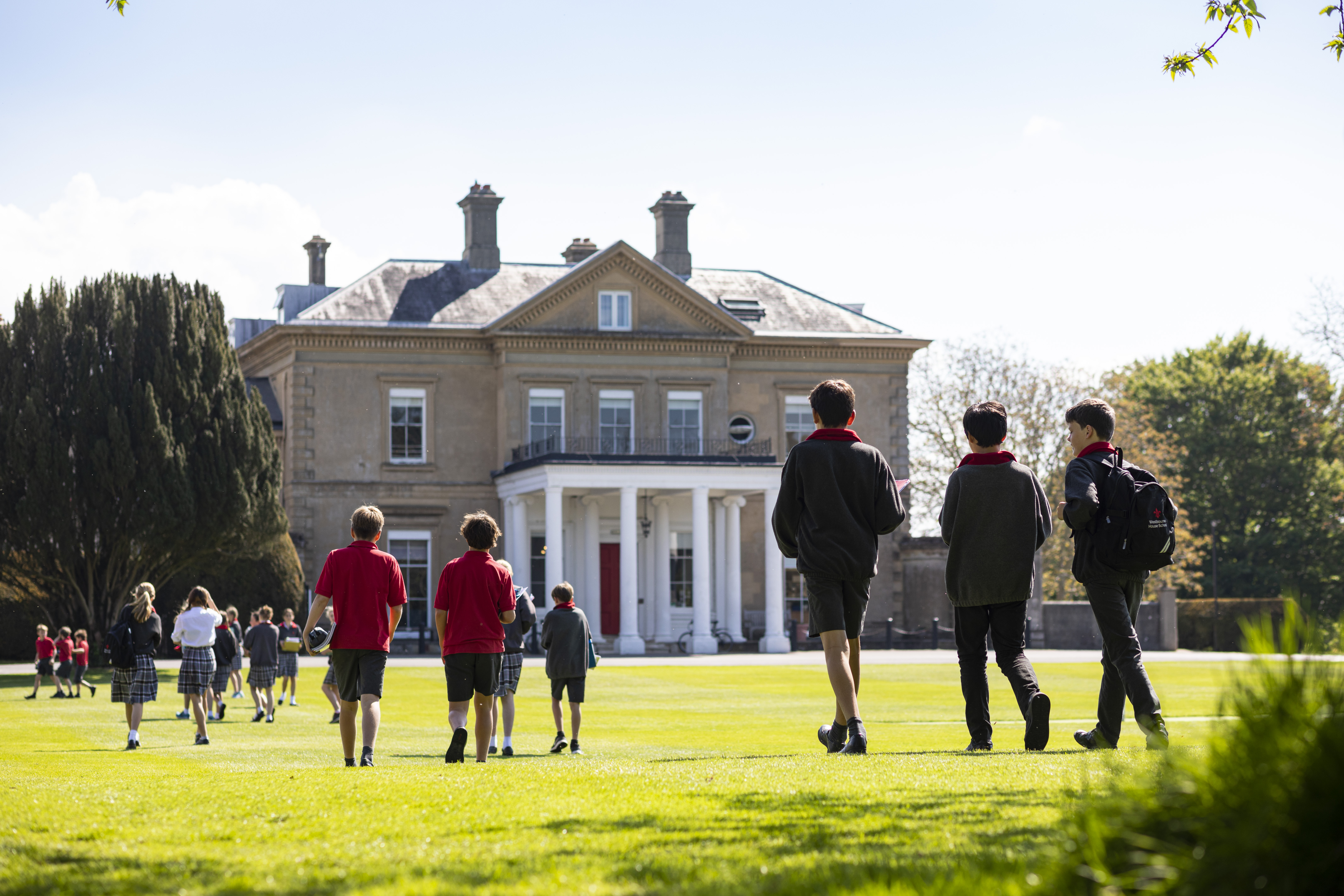
- View of the School from the Science Block

Location
- Coach Road, Shopwyke; Chichester, West Sussex, PO20 2BH; England; 50.8417°N 0.7403°W

Information
- Type: Preparatory, boarding
- Established: 29 January 1907; 119 years ago
- Local authority: West Sussex County Council
- Headmaster: Martin Barker
- Gender: co-educational
- Age: 2 1/2 to 13
- Enrolment: 380
- Houses: Tigers, Otters, Panthers, Owls
- Colours: Red, Green, Yellow, Blue
- Website: westbournehouse.org

Westbourne House School is a private preparatory school 1½ miles east of Chichester, West Sussex, England. It is co-educational and serves around 450 boarding and day-school pupils from ages 2–13. The headmaster is Martin Barker. The school is set in grounds of 100 acres and has a lake for kayaking and canoeing. The school has extensive sports facilities, a performing arts centre and art, design and technology studios. The school was the winner of the Alice Rose Award in the Talk Education Awards for Innovation in Education in 2022. Westbourne House is a High Performance Learning (HPL) World Class School and was first accredited in 2021.

== History ==
The school opened in 1907. It was originally a pre-prep school for boys located at Westbourne House in Folkestone, Kent. During World War I, the school moved to Dower House for safety under Miss Hare (later Mrs Hilton). In 1932, Geoffrey Shilcock took over from Mrs Hilton and the school became a preparatory school up to the age of 13. In 1939, the school moved by train to Upcott in Barnstaple, Devon, due to World War II. The previous site of the school was damaged during the war and the playing fields had been tarmacked over for use as tank parking, so the school moved to its current site at Shopwyke House in 1946. In 1961 the school temporarily closed, but reopened under Colin Sharman. In 1967, Westbourne House became a charitable trust. In 1992, the school became fully co-educational. Martin Barker became the headmaster in 2011. In 2022, a girls' cricket team at the school toured South Africa.

== Notable alumni ==
The following attended the school:

- Tom Bradby, journalist and author
- Marcus Brigstocke, comedian
- Nick Clarke, presenter and journalist
- Holly Colvin, England cricketer
- Norman Heatley, scientist
- Alastair Mackenzie, film and television actor
- Charlie Tear, cricketer
- Drummond Money-Coutts, magician
- Will Green, rugby
- Lucy Foley, author
- Toby Harries, Olympian, athlete
