= Mark Mardell =

British journalist

- Born: 10 September 1957 (age 68); Hillingdon, Middlesex, England, UK
- Education: Epsom College
- Alma mater: University of Kent
- Title: North America Editor of BBC News (2009–2014); Europe Editor of BBC News (2005–2009)
- Children: 3

Mark Mardell (born 10 September 1957, Hillingdon, Middlesex, England) is a British journalist, formerly the presenter of The World This Weekend on BBC Radio 4. He had previously served as BBC News's Europe editor, and provided coverage for each United Kingdom general election between 1992 and 2005, before he became North America editor.

== Early life ==
Mardell was raised in Surrey and, like Nicholas Witchell, his near-contemporary in BBC News, attended Epsom College. At the University of Kent he studied politics.

== Career ==
Mardell began his career reporting and reading the news for commercial station Radio Tees. He then worked at Radio Aire in Leeds before moving to Independent Radio News in London, where he became industrial editor covering the miners' strike and then the Wapping print dispute. He first appeared on television on Channel 4's The Sharp End. He joined the BBC in 1989 as political correspondent for the BBC Six O'Clock News.

From 1992 to 2000, Mardell worked as political editor for BBC Two's Newsnight programme. During this time he covered many political stories, including the fall of John Major's government and the rise of Tony Blair and New Labour. He returned to the Six O'Clock News, before becoming chief political correspondent and moving to the BBC Ten O'Clock News in 2003. Two years later he became the BBC's first Europe editor, covering the impact of European Union laws on people in and beyond the EU, from illegal immigration in Poland to environmental change in Spain.

Mardell regularly presented The World at One on BBC Radio 4, and presented a humorous review on This Week, BBC One's political chat show. He left his post as Europe editor to replace Justin Webb as BBC North America editor when Webb became a presenter on Radio 4's Today programme. At the end of April 2014, it emerged that Mardell was to leave his post in North America and become a presenter on BBC Radio 4, hosting The World This Weekend and the Friday edition of The World at One.

During his last World at One broadcast on 30 October 2020, Mardell announced his surprise departure from the BBC after 30 years, which he had stated from his Twitter account with a tweet to his followers. In a later interview to Feedback Mardell explained to presenter Roger Bolton that his voice and mobility had changed following diagnosis of Parkinson's disease. Bolton seemed to make light of the scoop, and focused on the number of "outstanding journalists" who had left BBC News ahead of budget cuts combined with the forthcoming limit on redundancy payments.

On BBC Radio 4's Today programme, broadcast on 3 October 2022, Mardell spoke freely of his illness with presenter Nick Robinson, and highlighted that presenter Jeremy Paxman had likewise been diagnosed with Parkinson's disease.

=== Podcast ===
Since March 2023 Mardell has contributed to a podcast Movers and Shakers which is "about life with Parkinson's". Recordings are made in a Notting Hill pub and presenters (Rory Cellan-Jones, Gillian Lacey-Solymar, Mardell, Paul Mayhew-Archer, Sir Nicholas Mostyn and Jeremy Paxman) discuss "the highs and lows, trials and tribulations, of living with the condition". In March 2024 The UK Broadcasting Press Guild made Movers and Shakers its 'UK Podcast of the Year'.

Media offices
Preceded by Justin Webb	North America Editor: BBC News; 2009–2014	Succeeded by Jon Sopel
Preceded by Position established	Europe Editor: BBC News; 2005–2009	Succeeded by Gavin Hewitt
Preceded by James Cox	Political Editor: Newsnight; 1994–2000	Succeeded by Martha Kearney
