= BBC MindGames =

UK magazine

- Editor: Cavan Scott
- Categories: Science and technology
- Frequency: 4 weeks
- Publisher: BBC Magazines Bristol
- First issue: June 2006
- Final issue Number: January 2007; 9
- Company: BBC Worldwide
- Country: United Kingdom
- Website: Official home page

BBC MindGames was a British magazine devoted to puzzles, brainteasers and articles concerning the mind. It was published every four weeks. Its name was taken from the BBC Four show, Mind Games.

== History and profile ==
The magazine was launched in June 2006 by Cam Winstanley, who edited the first three issues. From issue four (September 2006), Cavan Scott took over the editorship, bringing in more variety and a broader, less haughty tone. In common with other magazines in the BBC Worldwide stable, it had a glossy cover, extensive features and interviews, and a witty tone. The magazine was published on a monthly basis. The publisher BBC Magazines Bristol. Issue 9, published on 30 January 2007, was the last issue. A feature called Mind Games, including a similar selection of puzzles, now appears in BBC Focus magazine.

== Hidden features ==
The magazine contained a number of hidden puzzles, known as Easter Eggs. These usually lead to a coded message or word for the reader to discover. Issue 1 included a hidden URL for a web site concealed in an Acrostic style form.

The spine of the magazine included an anagram of the current issue in some form or another. For example:

1. Omen Disguises Name = MindGames Issue One
2. Men Do Disseminating Code = MindGames Second Edition
3. I Sleep with Imagery Unto Madness = MindGames Issue four - Play to Win!

Other easter eggs have included using dice printed on each page indicating the number of eyes visible on that page's spread, having differences between images of the front cover and the actual front cover, and hiding related words within articles.

== Global Hide and Seek ==
This puzzle is the brain-child of Cam Winstanley. The premise here is that a photograph is shown of a series of props, images and text, all of which will lead the solver to identifying a famous person (living or dead) hiding somewhere in the world, carrying out some activity or other. This puzzle is the cause of much frustration and enjoyment amongst the readers of the magazine, who will either work alone or in groups on the magazine's forum page to try to solve the clues.

== Regular characters ==
The magazine includes a number of characters who provide assistance, clues and additional puzzles for the readers. These characters were named by the readers of the Forum pages (see External Links) in weekly competitions.

== Links to other BBC programmes ==
The magazine was based on the BBC television programme Mind Games. Within the magazine are a number of articles and puzzles that are based upon or directly linked with existing BBC radio and television programmes. For example:

- Moral Maze - two different view points are given to a contentious issue (Based on the BBC Radio 4 programme Moral Maze).
- News Quiz - a look back at some of the month's more ridiculous news stories (based on the BBC Radio 4 game The News Quiz).
- Round Britain Quiz - A number of clues is given to a series of answers which all have a common link (based on the BBC Radio 4 game Round Britain Quiz).
- QI - facts and questions on general ignorance, based on the BBC Two programme of the same name.
- Mastermind - readers are invited to write questions about their specialist subjects.
- Call My Bluff - based on the vintage BBC quiz.

In addition, the regular logic puzzles were based around current BBC programmes. Past puzzles have included Torchwood, Spooks and EastEnders.

Some issues featured a game to seek out a picture of a BBC personality hidden in the pages. These included EastEnders character, Phil Mitchell, and TV/radio presenter, Terry Wogan.
