= William Davis (journalist) =

German–born British journalist, broadcaster, and editor (born 1933)

- Born: Gunther Keese; 6 March 1933; Hanover, Germany
- Died: 2 February 2019 (aged 85); Cannes, France
- Occupations: journalist, economist, radio and television presenter
- Children: 3

William Davis (born Gunther Keese; 6 March 1933 – 2 February 2019), was a journalist, broadcaster and editor. He was born in Germany but came to Britain in his teens, working for the Financial Times, Evening Standard and Guardian. He broadcast for the BBC and was a pioneering presenter of The Money Programme and The World at One. He became editor of Punch and was the founder of the British Airways in-flight magazine High Life. He became chairman of the British Tourist Authority and English Tourist Board in the 1990s and remained an active commentator, broadcaster and writer until his death in February 2019.

== Early life ==
Davis was born Gunther Kiess in Hanover, Germany, in 1933. During an appearance on BBC Radio 4's Desert Island Discs programme later in life, he described his childhood growing up in Germany during World War II as "very grim". Davis came to Britain aged 16, adopted British citizenship and anglicised his name. By the age of 18, he was already a journalist and specialised in commentary about economic and financial affairs.

== Career ==
During 1954–1959, William Davis was on the staff of the Financial Times, a British international business newspaper. Lord Beaverbrook appointed Davis the City Editor (1960–1965) of the London Evening Standard and he then went on to become Economics Editor (1965–1968) of The Guardian.

During this time Davis made regular appearances on the BBC's live Budget programmes presented by Ian Trethowan. Davis provided live comment and analysis of the Chancellor of the Exchequer's Budget speech as it was delivered in the House of Commons. There were no microphones or cameras in Parliament at the time, so details were relayed to the BBC studio via a teleprinter.

Davis presented BBC North's financial programme Prospect. He took the idea of popular financial journalism to Grace Wyndham Goldie and developed the idea into The Money Programme for BBC2, which he also presented. Davis was one of the first presenters of the Radio 4 programme The World at One, a role he shared with William Hardcastle.

In 1968 William Davis was named editor of the satirical magazine Punch and the rival publication Private Eye dubbed him "Kaiser Bill".

Davis was a chairman and a director of several publishing and travel companies. He founded and was editor-in-chief of, the in-flight magazine High Life. In the early 1990s William Davis became chairman of the British Tourist Authority and English Tourist Board.

Davis appeared as a contributor on The Pound in Your Pocket, a retrospective series of archive programmes shown on BBC Parliament in 2007. The programme marked forty years since the devaluation of the Pound by the British government on 18 November 1967, a subject covered by Davis in his book Three Years' Hard Labour: The Road to Devaluation.

== Death ==
Davis died at his home in Cannes, southern France, on 2 February 2019, after suffering heart failure.

== Bibliography ==
The following are books written by William Davis:

- Three Years' Hard Labour: The Road to Devaluation, 1968
- Merger Mania, 1970
- The Language of Money, 1973
- Pick of Punch, 1973 (editor)
- Punch Book of Travel, 1974 (editor)
- Punch Afloat, 1974 (editor)
- Have Expenses, Will Travel, 1975
- It's No Sin to be Rich, 1976
- The Best of Everything (editor), 1981
- The Rich, 1982
- Corporate Infighter's Handbook, 1984
- Fantasy: A Practical Guide to Escapism, 1984
- The Innovators, 1987
- Children of the Rich, 1989
- The Lucky Generation, 1995
- The Great Myths of Business, 1997
- The Rich: A New Study of the Species, 2006
- Caviar Dogs, 2008
- The Luck Factor, 2010
- The Alien, An Autobiography, 2014
- Lend Me Your Ears, 2016
- Wit and Humour Series (editor), 2016
- We Must Do Lunch, 2017
