= James Cox (journalist) =

British journalist and broadcaster (1941–2024)

- Born: 14 November 1941; Harrow, Middlesex, England
- Died: 24 September 2024 (aged 82)
- Occupation(s): Journalist, presenter
- Notable credit(s): The World This Weekend; Good Morning Scotland

James Heddle Cox (14 November 1941 – 24 September 2024) was a British journalist and broadcaster who had a wide-ranging career in newspapers and in broadcasting in Scotland.

After a spell with the Daily Record newspaper in Glasgow he worked on Public Account from 1975 with Donald MacCormick and Andrew Neil and presented Good Morning Scotland on BBC Radio Scotland for many years.

He became the BBC's North America Correspondent based in New York City in 1983 before returning to London as a BBC political correspondent at Westminster and then joining Newsnight on BBC2.

From 1994 to 2005 he was presenter of The World This Weekend on BBC Radio 4.

Cox died from complications of multiple sclerosis on 24 September 2024, at the age of 82.

Media offices
Preceded by ?	Political Editor: Newsnight ?–1994	Succeeded by Mark Mardell
