= Jonny Dymond =

British journalist

- Born: Jonathan David Dymond; 15 February 1970 (age 56); Merton, Greater London, England
- Education: St Paul's School, London; Durham University; London School of Economics
- Occupations: Journalist, correspondent, radio presenter
- Employer: BBC News
- Known for: BBC Royal Correspondent (2017—present); Presenter, The World at One and Broadcasting House (BBC Radio 4); BBC Washington Correspondent (2010—2017); BBC Europe Correspondent (2005—2010); BBC Middle East Correspondent (2001—2005); BBC Washington reporter (2000—2001)
- Spouse: Hettie Judah (divorced)

Jonathan David Dymond (born 15 February 1970 in Merton, London) is a British journalist and broadcaster. He is the Royal Correspondent for BBC News, having previously been the BBC's Washington Correspondent, Europe Correspondent (based in Brussels), and Middle East Correspondent (based in Istanbul). Dymond is also a presenter of The World at One and The World This Weekend on BBC Radio 4. He sometimes presents Broadcasting House and the Today programme. He also presents The World This Week and World Questions on the BBC World Service.

== Education ==
Dymond attended St Paul's School, an independent school for boys in the London district of Barnes, between 1983 and 1987. From 1988 until 1991, he studied politics at Durham University, and in 1993 he completed an MSc in public administration and public policy at the London School of Economics and Political Science.

== Career ==
Dymond joined the BBC in 1994 as a researcher and later became a producer on Newsnight. Following this he worked as a reporter, first covering British politics for the BBC World Service and BBC World Service Television, then in 2000 moving to Washington, D.C. He covered 9/11 from DC, then went to Istanbul to cover Turkey and the Middle East between 2001 and 2005. He hosted Americana, a BBC Radio 4 programme about American events; he was working as a BBC correspondent in North America in 2011.

After some years as a foreign correspondent in Brussels, Dymond became a royal correspondent in 2017. Interviewed for the November 2019 edition of Town and Country, Dymond was critical of Prince Andrew for agreeing to be interviewed by Emily Maitlis about the controversy over his friendship with the American billionaire and convicted sex offender Jeffrey Epstein, suggesting it was a 'fantasy' that Prince Andrew could have reversed public opinion in one 40 minute interview. He told the same magazine that Prince Harry was rude to members of the press during a royal tour of Australia, New Zealand, and some Pacific Islands in 2018, but declined to go into details about what Prince Harry had said to them.

From 2020 onwards he has, in addition to being a Royal Correspondent, been the regular presenter of The World This Weekend and the Friday edition of The World At One on BBC Radio 4.

== Personal life ==
In 2008, Dymond was fined £230 for possession of cannabis, after a search at an airport in Vilnius found two grams (1/16 oz) of the drug among his clothes. Dymond admitted to purchasing cannabis at a nightclub, but claimed he packed it into his suitcase inadvertently.

In November 2024, Dymond apologised for not declaring his pay, from corporate events, on the BBC's public register of staff earnings from activities conducted outside of their BBC roles.

== See also ==
- List of Durham University people
- List of Old Paulines
