= Jeremy Paxman =

English retired journalist, author and broadcaster (born 1950)

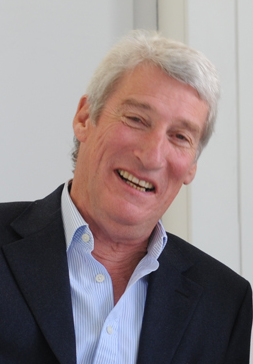
- Paxman in May 2014
- Born: 11 May 1950 (age 76); Leeds, England
- Education: St Catharine's College, Cambridge
- Occupations: Broadcaster, journalist, author
- Years active: 1972–2023
- Employer(s): BBC (former), Channel 4 (former)
- Known for: Former Newsnight presenter and former quizmaster of University Challenge
- Television: Newsnight (1989–2014); University Challenge (1994–2023); Christmas University Challenge (2011–2022)
- Partner: Elizabeth Ann Clough (1981–2016)
- Children: 3
- Relatives: Giles Paxman (brother)
- Website: jeremypaxman.co.uk

Jeremy Dickson Paxman (born 11 May 1950) is an English former broadcaster, journalist and author, born in Yorkshire.

Born in Leeds, Paxman was educated at Malvern College and St Catharine's College, Cambridge, where he edited the undergraduate newspaper Varsity. At Cambridge, he was a member of a Labour Party club and described himself as a socialist, in later life describing himself as a one-nation conservative. He joined the BBC in 1972, initially at BBC Radio Brighton, relocating to London in 1977. In following years, he worked on Tonight and Panorama, becoming a newsreader for the BBC Six O'Clock News and later a presenter on Breakfast Time and University Challenge.

In 1989, he became a presenter for the BBC Two programme Newsnight, interviewing many political figures. Paxman became known for his forthright interviewing style, particularly when interrogating politicians. These appearances were sometimes criticised as aggressive, intimidating and condescending, yet also applauded as tough and incisive. In 2014, Paxman left Newsnight after 25 years as its presenter. Since then, he has done occasional work for Channel 4 News. From its revival in 1994 up until he stepped down from the show in 2023, he presented University Challenge and its Christmas spin-off from 2011 to 2022. In 2022, he announced he was standing down, as he had been diagnosed with Parkinson's disease.

== Early life and education ==
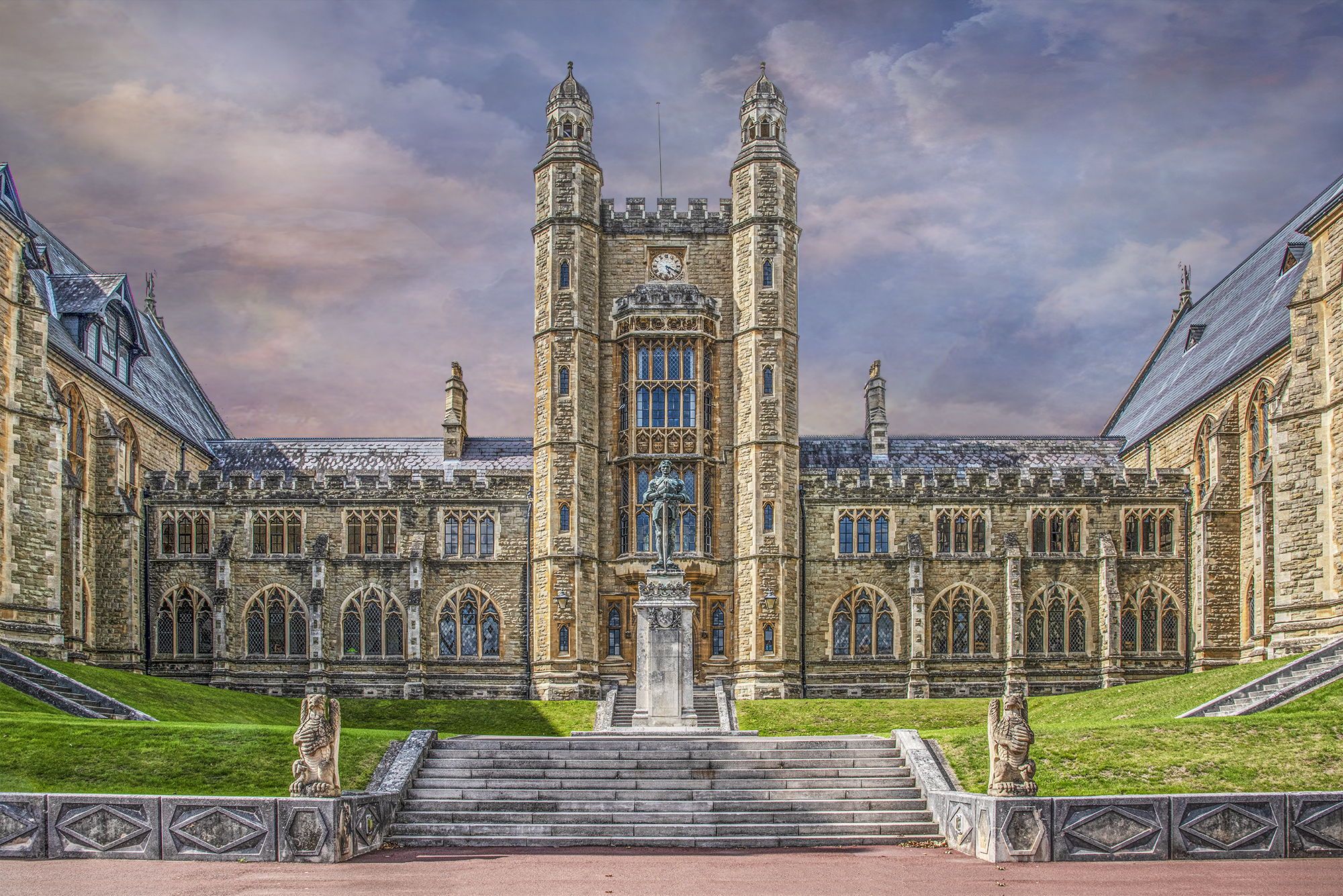
Malvern College, which Paxman attended

Paxman was born in Leeds, West Riding of Yorkshire, the son of steel company employee and former Royal Navy lieutenant and typewriter salesman (Arthur) Keith Paxman, who left the family and settled in Australia, and Joan McKay (née Dickson; 1920–2009). Keith Paxman's father was a worsted spinner, who became sufficiently prosperous as a travelling sales representative to send his son to public school in Bradford. The Dickson family were wealthier, with Keith's father-in-law, a self-made success, paying the Paxman children's school fees.

Paxman is the eldest of four children: one of his brothers, Giles Paxman, was the British ambassador to Spain (having previously been ambassador to Mexico), and the other, James, is chief executive of the Dartmoor Preservation Association. His sister, Jenny, is a producer at BBC Radio.

Paxman was brought up in Hampshire, Bromsgrove, and Peopleton near Pershore in Worcestershire. He went to Malvern College in 1964, his time there was not without incident, his memoir touched on his housemaster's appraisal of him following the "students final rustication" while at the College, prior to taking his A-levels. He later read English at St Catharine's College, Cambridge, where he edited the university student newspaper Varsity. While at Cambridge, Paxman was briefly a member of the Cambridge Universities Labour Club, attending only one meeting, finding student politics "self-important and trivial at the same time." He has since been made an honorary fellow of the College.

In January 2006, Paxman was the subject of an episode of the BBC genealogy series Who Do You Think You Are?. The documentary concluded that he was descended from Roger Packsman, a 14th-century politician from Suffolk who had changed his name to Paxman to impress the electorate (pax being Latin for 'peace'). Paxman's maternal grandmother was born in Glasgow, Scotland. The programme generated much publicity before its transmission by displaying him with tears in his eyes on camera when informed that his impoverished great-grandmother Mary McKay's poor relief had been revoked because she had a child out of wedlock.

== Career ==
=== Journalism ===
Paxman joined the BBC's graduate trainee programme in 1972. He started in local radio, at BBC Radio Brighton. He moved to Belfast, where he reported on the Troubles. He moved to London in 1977. Two years later he transferred from the Tonight programme to Panorama. After five years reporting from places such as Beirut, Uganda and Central America, he read the Six O'Clock News for two years, before moving to BBC1's Breakfast Time programme.

=== Newsnight (1989–2014) ===
Paxman became a presenter of Newsnight in 1989.

On 13 May 1997 he interviewed Michael Howard, who had been Home Secretary until 13 days earlier after he had held a meeting with Derek Lewis, head of Her Majesty's Prison Service, about the possible dismissal of the governor of Parkhurst Prison, John Marriott. Howard was asked by Paxman the same question – "Did you threaten to overrule him [Lewis]?" – a total of twelve times in succession (fourteen, if the first two inquiries worded somewhat differently and some time before the succession of twelve are included).

During a 20th anniversary edition of Newsnight in 2000, Paxman told Howard that he had simply been trying to prolong the interview because the next item in the running order was not ready: "By the time I'd asked the question five or six times ... it was clear ... that you [Howard] weren't going to answer it ... at which point a voice came in my ear and said 'The next piece of tape isn't cut, you'd better carry on with this for a while' and I'm afraid I couldn't think of anything else to ask you."

In 1998, Denis Halliday, a United Nations Humanitarian Coordinator, resigned his post in Iraq, describing the effects of his own organisation's sanctions as genocide. Paxman asked Halliday in a Newsnight interview, "Aren't you just an apologist for Saddam Hussein?"

In February 2003, Paxman was criticised by the Broadcasting Standards Commission over a Newsnight interview in which he questioned the then Liberal Democrat leader Charles Kennedy about his drinking. The commission said that the questioning was "overly intrusive in nature and tone and had exceeded acceptable boundaries for broadcast".

In 2003, Prime Minister Tony Blair opted to make the case for the invasion of Iraq via questions from a TV studio audience, mediated by Paxman. The programme is chiefly remembered for the fact that Paxman asked Blair if he and U.S. president Bush prayed together. Blair replied, "No, Jeremy. We don't pray together." To which Paxman replied, "But why not?"

During the 2005 general election, some viewers complained to the BBC that Paxman's questioning of party leaders had been rude and aggressive. He was criticised for his 5 am interview with George Galloway after his election as the Respect MP for Bethnal Green and Bow by the just defeated Oona King. Paxman asked Galloway more than once whether he was proud of having got rid of "one of the very few black women in Parliament." Galloway cut the interview short. King later said she "did not wish to be defined, by either [her] ethnicity or religious background."

On 11 April 2012, Paxman interviewed Russell Brand about Brand's political views and the article he wrote for the New Statesman. The interview went viral as Brand stated that it was "futile" to vote and that a "political revolution" was needed. After this interview, Paxman revealed that he had not voted either in some previous elections.

On 26 June 2012, he interviewed Economic Secretary to the Treasury Chloe Smith about Chancellor George Osborne's decision that day to delay plans to increase fuel duty. Paxman questioned the apparent change in her views on fuel duty. Senior politicians, including John Prescott, questioned Osborne's judgement for sending a junior minister onto the programme in place of himself.

The BBC announced Paxman's departure from Newsnight at the end of April 2014. He had told Lord Hall of Birkenhead, the director-general of the BBC, and James Harding, the BBC head of news, that he wished to leave in July 2013, but agreed to stay on Newsnight for another year after the programme had been damaged by the Savile and Lord McAlpine scandals. In his statement Paxman commented: "After 25 years, I should rather like to go to bed at much the same time as most people."

Paxman's brusque manner is not restricted to political interviews. When around 2005 Newsnight's editor decided to broadcast brief weather forecasts instead of financial reports Paxman openly ridiculed the decision: "The forecast: it's April, what do you expect?" The financial reports were re-introduced after a few weeks.

Paxman presented his last Newsnight on 18 June 2014 in an edition which included an interview with Peter Mandelson and one with London mayor Boris Johnson, while they both rode a tandem bicycle, as well as a brief reappearance of Michael Howard who, following on from his 1997 interview, was simply asked: "Did you?". The closing theme was replaced with I'd Like to Teach the World to Sing by the New Seekers. The programme ended with a brief post-credits scene with Paxman standing in front of a weather map exclaiming "Tomorrow's weather: more of the same! I don't know why they make such a fuss about it" in reference to the 2005 weather forecasts.

=== Other TV work ===
Paxman has presented the weekly TV programme review Did You See...? and You Decide. From 1994 to 2023, he was the quizmaster for University Challenge, bringing him the distinction of "longest-serving current quizmaster on British TV." In 2013, the BBC received 44 complaints after Paxman's "acerbic" remarks caused a 20-year-old contestant to repeatedly apologise for answering a question wrongly. In October 2022, an ITV documentary, Paxman: Putting Up With Parkinson's, revealed how the disease has impacted him and revealed that Paxman recorded his very last episode of University Challenge on 15 October 2022, which aired on 29 May 2023. He presented a weekly compilation of highlights from the domestic edition of Newsnight from February 2008 until shortly after the 2008 U.S. election on BBC America and BBC World, when the American programme was cancelled. The programme is still aired on BBC World.

In April 2006, The Sun claimed that Paxman earned £800,000 for his Newsnight job and £240,000 for presenting University Challenge, bringing his TV earnings to a yearly total of £1,040,000. This was one of a series of BBC salary leaks in the tabloid press that prompted an internal BBC investigation.

Paxman appeared as himself in an episode of BBC comedy The Thick of It that aired in January 2007. He is seen grilling Junior Minister Ben Swain (played by Justin Edwards) in a disastrous Newsnight interview.

Beginning on 15 February 2009, Paxman's four-part documentary The Victorians was transmitted on BBC One. The series explores Victorian art and culture. From 27 February until 26 March 2012, BBC One broadcast his series Empire, examining the history and legacy of the British Empire.

In 2014, Paxman presented Britain's Great War, an accompaniment to his 2013 book Great Britain's Great War.

On 26 March 2015, Paxman co-presented, with Kay Burley, David Cameron and Ed Miliband Live: The Battle for Number 10, in which he interviewed both British Prime Minister David Cameron and Opposition Leader Ed Miliband regarding their track record in politics and their plans if elected Prime Minister in the general election set for May of that year. He also hosted Channel 4's Alternative Election Night with David Mitchell. He then later co-presented a similar programme with Faisal Islam, interviewing Jeremy Corbyn and Theresa May before the 2017 general election on 29 May, May v Corbyn Live: The Battle for Number 10.

=== Books ===
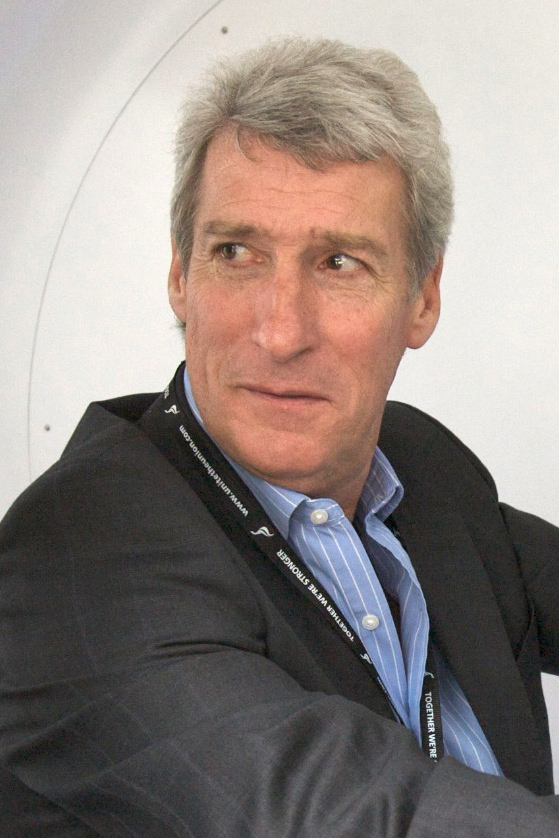
Paxman in September 2009

Paxman's first book, A Higher Form of Killing (1982), written with then BBC colleague and friend Robert Harris, arose out of an edition of the Panorama programme they had made together on biological and chemical warfare. In a revised 2002 version they asserted that Iraq possessed chemical and biological weapons. In 1985, Paxman published Through the Volcanoes: A Central American Journey, an eyewitness account of people, places and politics. Friends in High Places: Who Runs Britain? (1991) was the result of numerous detailed interviews with the powerful or highly influential, what used to be called The Establishment. 1999 saw the publication of his The English: A Portrait of a People. The Political Animal: An Anatomy (2003), again based on extensive interviews, examines the motivations and methods of those who constitute the author's professional prey: Westminster politicians.

The otherwise-republican Paxman's On Royalty, which entailed the cooperation of Britain's Royal Family, became by the time it was published in 2006 a defence of the country's constitutional monarchy. His recent books have been big sellers. His history book, The Victorians: Britain through the Paintings of the Age, published in 2009, was accompanied by a BBC documentary series. In his introduction, Paxman acknowledged that the Irish writer Neil Hegarty had played a significant role in editing the book and bringing it to completion. Paxman stated that since all television is a "collaborative exercise", it was "rather silly for this book – which accompanies a television series – to appear with only one name on the cover." Paxman's most recent book is a study of the British Empire, Empire: What Ruling the World Did to the British.

Paxman kept a detached tone while writing his memoir, A Life in Questions, which was published in October 2016.

=== Radio ===
Paxman presented the flagship BBC Radio 4 show Start the Week from 1998 to 2002.

=== Podcast ===
Since March 2023 Paxman has contributed to a podcast 'Movers and Shakers' which is "about life with Parkinson's". Recordings are made in a Notting Hill pub and presenters (Rory Cellan-Jones, Gillian Lacey-Solymar, Mark Mardell, Paul Mayhew-Archer, Sir Nicholas Mostyn and Jeremy Paxman) discuss "the highs and lows, trials and tribulations, of living with the condition". In March 2024 The UK Broadcasting Press Guild made 'Movers and Shakers' its 'UK Podcast of the Year'.

=== Other positions ===
Paxman is a Vice-President of The London Library.

== Paxman and the BBC ==
During John Birt's tenure as director-general of the BBC, the British press occasionally reported Paxman's criticism of Birt. Birt was suspected at first to be an outsider brought in by a hostile government to supervise the BBC's break-up and ultimate sell-off. Birt then publicly questioned the confrontational approach of certain TV and radio interviewers. This was seen at the time as coded criticism of Paxman himself and of his BBC colleague John Humphrys.

On 24 August 2007, Paxman delivered the MacTaggart Memorial Lecture at the Edinburgh International Television Festival. In it he was critical of much of contemporary television in Britain. He expressed concern that as a consequence of recent production scandals the medium was "rapidly losing public trust". Speaking of prime minister Tony Blair's criticism of the mass media at the time he left office, Paxman asserted that, though often, press and broadcasting may be "oppositional" in relation to the government of the day, this "could only benefit democracy". "Those Reithian goals, to 'inform, educate and entertain,' still remained valid". Paxman took the opportunity to dismiss as "inaccurate" the attribution to him, which was in fact, Louis Heren, of the oft-quoted "Why is this lying bastard lying to me?" as the supposed dominant thought in his mind when interviewing senior politicians. He called on the television industry to "rediscover a sense of purpose".

In November 2012, Paxman publicly defended George Entwistle following his resignation as director-general of the BBC in connection with a Newsnight report which falsely implicated Lord McAlpine in the North Wales child abuse scandal. Paxman claimed Entwistle had been "brought low by cowards and incompetents" and criticised appointments of "biddable people" to the BBC in the wake of the Hutton Inquiry, as well as cuts to BBC programme budgets and "bloated" BBC management.

In August 2013, Paxman appeared on Newsnight with a beard, causing a Twitter trend when he accused the BBC of having an aversion to beards.

== Awards and honours ==
In 1996 Paxman received BAFTA's Richard Dimbleby Award for "outstanding presenter in the factual arena." Two years later he won the Royal Television Society's Interviewer of the Year Award for his Newsnight interview (see above) with Michael Howard, as well as the Broadcasting Press Guild's award for best "non-acting" performer. He gained another Richard Dimbleby Award in 2000 and was nominated for the award in 2001 and 2002. In total, Paxman has won five Royal Television Society awards. He won the award for International Current Affairs in 1985, and TV journalism interviewer/presenter of the year four times (1997, 1998, 2001 and 2008).

Paxman was given an honorary doctorate by the University of Leeds in the summer of 1999 and in December that year received an honorary degree from the University of Bradford. In 2006 he received an honorary doctorate from the Open University. Among those at the ceremony were three members of the Open University's 1999 University Challenge team. Paxman is a Fellow by special election of St Edmund Hall, Oxford, and an Honorary Fellow of his alma mater, St. Catharine's College, Cambridge. In July 2016, Paxman was awarded an honorary degree from the University of Exeter for achievements in the field of broadcasting and journalism.

He is played by Nicholas Rowe in the 2025 ITV drama about the News International phone hacking scandal, The Hack.

== Personal life ==
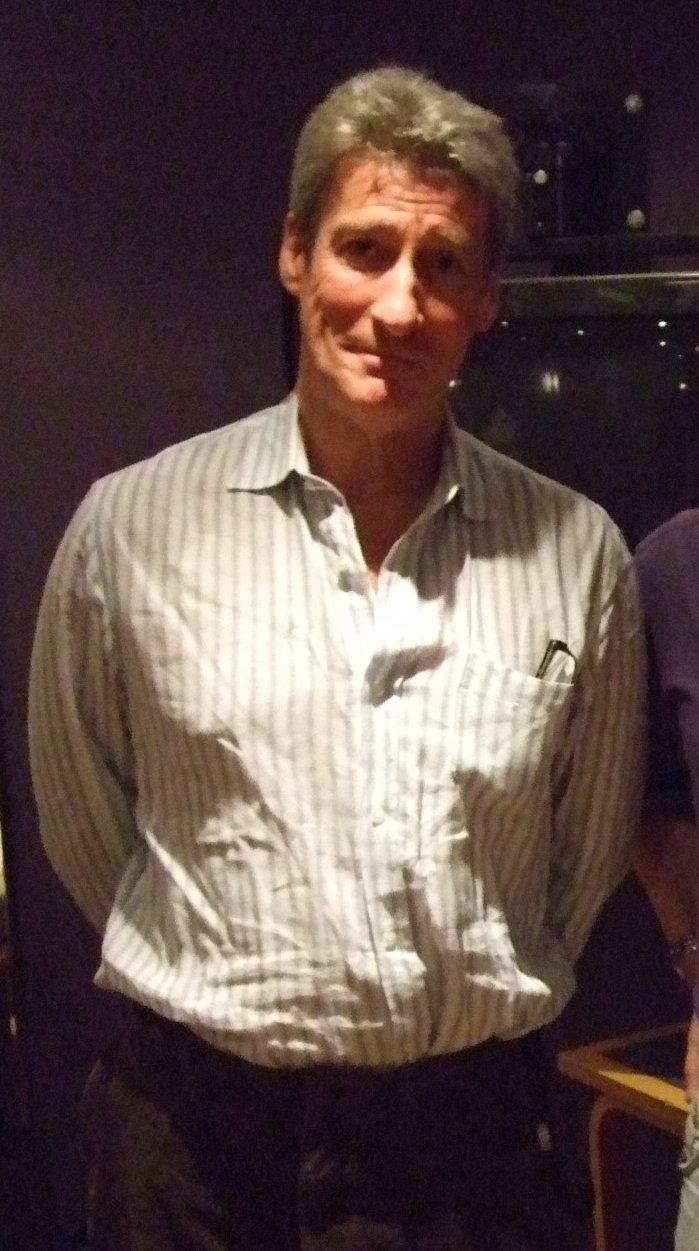
Paxman in 2007

Paxman formerly lived with television producer Elizabeth Clough in Stonor, southeast Oxfordshire. They have three children. The couple, who did not marry, amicably separated in 2016 after 35 years together. He prefers to keep his private life "out of the spotlight" and says he is not interested in the private lives of others. He has a flat in Kensington, London.

Paxman supports Leeds United and enjoys fly fishing. He is vice-chairman of the Wild Trout Trust conservation charity. He is also a patron of the charity Sustrans and east London homeless charity Caritas Anchor House.

In his twenties, Paxman unsuccessfully applied for the vacant editorship of the Labour-supporting weekly, the New Statesman; he said that in his youth he considered himself a socialist. He had previously stood as a communist candidate in his school elections. More recently, he has been described as "the archetypal floating voter", and Jon Snow once said that Paxman's greatest strength was being "not very political". In 2014, Paxman described himself as a one-nation conservative. Elsewhere, Paxman has stated that he has no dominant political ideology:

I do understand we have to have a government, and I do firmly believe in democracy. So it's not true to say I'm not a political person. I am a political person. But I'm not a party political person. I don't believe there is a monopoly of wisdom in any one party. I suppose as one gets older – I would have described it at the age of 21 as the process of selling out, but another way of looking at it is to say, actually, the world is not a very simple place, and that as you get older simple-minded solutions seem less attractive.

In the 2019 documentary, Paxman on the Queen's Children, Paxman, who had previously described himself as a republican, declared that he was now a monarchist, citing his years of interviewing politicians as having convinced him that "representing the country should be kept out of the hands of those who want the job."

As part of a 2009 campaign by the Parkinson's Disease Society Paxman, along with Jane Asher and John Stapleton, pledged to donate his brain to Parkinson's research following his death.

In June 2014, Paxman, speaking at the Chalke Valley History Festival about his new book, Britain's Great War, said that Newsnight was made by "idealistic 13-year-olds" who "foolishly thought they could change the world". "Look, Newsnight is made by 13-year-olds. It's perfectly normal when you're young that you want to change the world," Paxman said. "The older you get, the more you realise what a fools' errand much of that is and that the thing to do is to manage the best you can to the advantage of as many people as possible." Speaking about his political views in general, he said he was "in favour of governments getting out of people's lives – particularly foreign government", saying Europe had been "nothing but trouble for us". He also joked that Belgium was a "pointless little country". "The closer you can take decision-making to the people affected by those decisions, the better." In 2019, in an interview with 60 Minutes on Australia's Nine Network, Paxman said he voted remain in the 2016 United Kingdom European Union membership referendum (initially intending to vote leave), but believed the result had to be respected:

I went to the polling station intending to vote leave and I ended up voting remain, because as I walked in I thought "it's an awful institution the European Union but it's all we've got." So that's why I changed my mind... But actually I think now you can't tell people that you're gonna have a referendum and their vote will be respected and then not respect it, you just can't do it. It shows utter contempt for the voters.

Paxman became a focus of media attention in October 2000 when a German Enigma machine, which had been stolen from Bletchley Park Museum, was inexplicably sent to him in the post. He returned it to the museum.

In an interview with Emily Dean on a Times Radio podcast, Paxman described his experience with depression. He said that he takes psychiatric medication and has undergone Cognitive behavioural therapy. He stated that he regularly walks his dog, Derek, which "helps as he meets people", and that his dog "makes him laugh".

In September 2021, whilst promoting his book Black Gold: The History of How Coal Made Britain, Paxman revealed his support for Scottish independence. Talking to The Sunday Times, he said, "My view about the Union is that if there is to be a referendum then the English should be allowed a vote as well. We are supposedly a nation of equals, so we should be equally entitled to a vote. And although I am a quarter Scottish I would vote to separate, I think. Because I can't see what is gained by persistently giving the Jocks an excuse. We're always going to be friends."

Paxman revealed in May 2021 that he is receiving treatment for Parkinson's disease, describing his symptoms as "mild". Shan Nicholas of Parkinson's UK said, "Previously, Jeremy pledged to donate his brain to the Parkinson's UK Brain Bank which will, one day, help scientists uncover the discoveries that will lead to better treatments and a cure for Parkinson's."

In October 2022 an ITV documentary, Paxman: Putting Up With Parkinson's, revealed how the disease has impacted him – the programme showed him attending a ballet class, learning to play bowls, meeting experts and observing a brain dissection. He met Sharon Osbourne, the wife of musician and fellow Parkinson's sufferer Ozzy Osbourne, to discuss the role of a partner or family carer; he agreed to her suggestion to one day try cannabidiol oil to relieve the symptoms of Parkinson's. The programme revealed that Paxman recorded his last episode of University Challenge on 15 October 2022.

In April 2024 Paxman delivered a petition to 10 Downing Street with recommendations concerning NHS treatment of patients with Parkinson's Disease, which he commented "may not kill you but it will make you wish you hadn't been born."

== Controversies ==
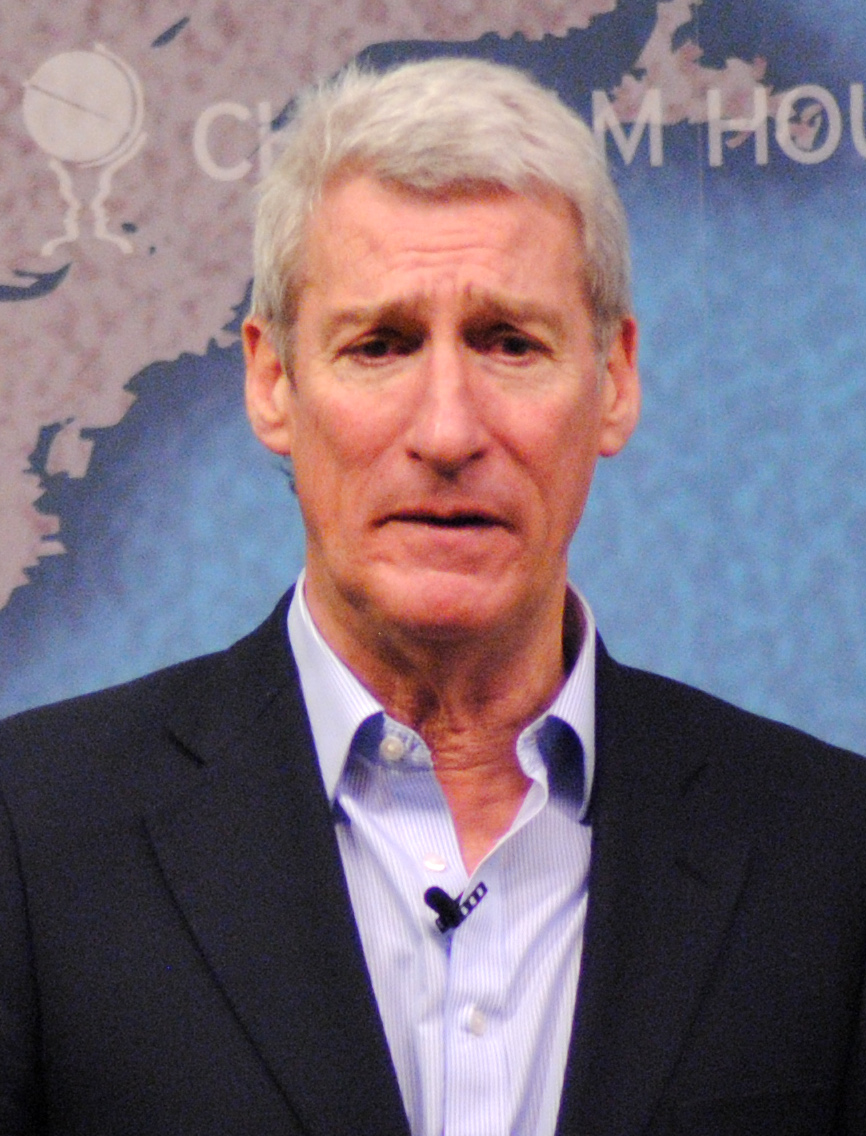
Paxman in February 2014

While presenting a Newsnight segment in 2005, Paxman referred to Secretary of State for Health John Reid as an "attack dog". In response, Reid accused Paxman of criticising him due to Reid's Glaswegian accent. Paxman responded to Reid's comment by stating that he admired his "knowledge" and "strength of character", but could not understand why Reid went "doolally" over Paxman's criticism of him, further claiming that it was "extremely bizarre" that certain Scottish people had a "chip on their shoulder" over their nationality. He went on to state that "I mean down here we live under a sort of Scottish Raj... I don't see why there is any reason for them to feel chippy. Do we complain about it? No we don't. I think it's absurd. I don't understand wherein lies this angst." In reaction to Paxman's statements on Scotland, twenty Scottish MPs, including Jim Sheridan, Iain Luke and Brian Donohoe, signed a House of Commons motion criticising the statements as "insulting, irresponsible, divisive and snobbish".

In 2008, Paxman's employment of domestic workers became the subject of public attention after the News of the World newspaper published an article about two Romanian nationals who had been employed by Paxman. The article contained testimonies from the two workers, who criticised Paxman for treating them "like a common serving girl" and paying wages of only £200 per week, which was under the British minimum wage (though as the two were live-in workers the minimum wage did not apply to them). They also criticised Paxman for not giving them an official employment contract or paid time off. In the same year, Paxman was the subject of further controversy when he described the work of Scottish poet Robert Burns as "sentimental doggerel" in the introduction of the 2008 edition of Chambers Dictionary.

On a Newsnight segment aired on 31 May 2012, Paxman, discussing the possibility of a Greek withdrawal from the eurozone, stated that Greece, "like a bad kebab", faced the possibility of being "vomited out of the single currency". This statement was criticised in the same segment by the Greek Minister of Environment, Energy and Climate Change Giorgos Papakonstantinou, who told Paxman during an interview that "Can I take issue with your 'bad kebab' analogy, which I find offensive. The Greek economy is in a crisis and the Greek people are going through a lot, and deserve some respect, and I really did not find that very appropriate." While appearing on The Graham Norton Show in 2013, Paxman referred to British Prime Minister David Cameron as a "complete idiot" for his role in Britain's First World War centenary commemorations. In response, MP Rob Wilson wrote to the director-general of the BBC, Lord Hall, to demand an apology from Paxman. In an interview conducted in the same year with Russell Brand, Paxman revealed that he had not voted at a recent election due to finding the available candidates "unappetising", which led to criticism from Deputy Prime Minister Nick Clegg.

John Pilger has raised Paxman's membership of the British-American Project in the context of political biases of mainstream media.

Paxman was criticised for his presentation of the BBC documentary Britain's Great War. While describing how British conscientious objectors were jailed and threatened with the death penalty because killing was against their beliefs, Paxman ventured his own opinion that it was the objectors themselves who were at fault, and that they were "extreme". The conscientious objectors, Paxman said, "have always struck me as cranks".

In 2017, Paxman's interviews of Jeremy Corbyn and Theresa May for the upcoming general election were described by journalist Michael Deacon as "embarrassing". Deacon opined that Paxman's pugnacious style of questioning had become tired, claiming that he had been "doing an impression of himself".

== Bibliography ==
- Harris, Robert; Paxman, Jeremy (1982). A Higher Form of Killing: The Secret Story of Chemical and Biological Warfare. New York, N.Y.: Hill and Wang. ISBN 0-8090-5471-X. New edition published as Harris, Robert; Paxman, Jeremy (2002). A Higher Form of Killing: The Secret History of Gas and Germ Warfare. London: Arrow. ISBN 0-09-944159-4.
- Paxman, Jeremy (1985). Through the Volcanoes: A Central American Journey. London: Paladin. ISBN 0-586-08572-6.
- Paxman, Jeremy (1991). Friends in High Places: Who Runs Britain?. London; New York, N.Y.: Penguin. ISBN 0-14-015600-3.
- Paxman, Jeremy (1996). Fish, Fishing, and the Meaning of Life. London; New York, N.Y.: Penguin. ISBN 0-14-023741-0.
- Paxman, Jeremy (1999). The English: A Portrait of a People. London: Penguin. ISBN 0-14-026723-9.
- The 20th Century Day by Day (Foreword by Jeremy Paxman)
- Paxman, Jeremy (2003). The Political Animal: An Anatomy. London: Penguin. ISBN 0-14-028847-3.
- Paxman, Jeremy (2006). On Royalty. London; New York, N.Y.: Viking. ISBN 0-670-91662-5.
- Gulliver's Travels by Jonathan Swift (Introduction by Jeremy Paxman)
- Paxman, Jeremy (2009). The Victorians: Britain Through the Paintings of the Age. London: BBC Books. ISBN 978-1-84607-744-9.
- Paxman, Jeremy (2011). Empire: What Ruling the World Did to the British. London: Viking. ISBN 978-0-670-91957-4.
- Paxman, Jeremy (2013). Great Britain's Great War. London: Viking. ISBN 978-0-670-91961-1.
- Paxman, Jeremy (2021). Black Gold: The History of How Coal Made Britain. London: William Collins. ISBN 978-0-008-12834-0.
