= PM (BBC Radio 4) =

British radio news and current affairs programme

- Genre: Current affairs
- Running time: 30–60 minutes
- Country of origin: United Kingdom
- Language: English
- Home station: BBC Radio 4
- Hosted by: Evan Davis (Monday–Friday); Caroline Wyatt (Saturday)
- Edited by: Owenna Griffiths
- Recording studio: BBC Television Centre, London (until 2012); Broadcasting House, London (2012 – present)
- Original release: 6 April 1970 – present
- Audio format: Stereo
- Website: PM

PM, sometimes referred to as the PM programme, is BBC Radio 4's long-running early evening news and current affairs programme. It is presented by Evan Davis and produced by BBC News.

Launched in 1970, PM is known for its serious news content and occasional satirical commentary. Evan Davis has served as the lead presenter since 2018. The show also spun off a programme called iPM, which allowed listeners to engage in discussions and influence content through a blog. PM has won awards at the Sony Radio Academy Awards, and its production team also work on other Radio 4 programmes.

== Broadcast times ==
PM is broadcast from 17:00 to 18:00 from Monday to Friday and from 17:00 to 17:30 on Saturdays. Until 2024, the final five minutes of the weekday edition was only broadcast on the FM version of Radio 4, as the LW version broke away from the programme at 17:54 to broadcast the teatime shipping forecast.

== History ==
PM launched on 6 April 1970, with its first presenters, William Hardcastle and Derek Cooper, promising a programme that "sums up the day, and your evening starts here". Radio 4's late news programme The World Tonight was launched on the same day.

PM made history for being the first radio news programme to feature its own theme tune. Three have been used, with the last ending in 1997 in the aftermath of the death of Princess Diana. The first PM theme tune was by John Baker and the BBC Radiophonic Workshop. The second theme was written by Paddy Kingsland of the BBC Radiophonic Workshop and was used from 1978, with the final one, used between 1988 and 1997, by George Fenton.

Notable presenters after William Hardcastle included Steve Race, Brian Widlake, Robert Williams, Chris Lowe, Roger Cook, Joan Bakewell, Susannah Simons, Rachael Heyhoe Flint and Valerie Singleton (a former Blue Peter presenter – in pre-interview chats, junior ministers "inevitably" claimed that they still had their Blue Peter badge).

During the late 1970s and early 1980s, the programme's main presenter was Gordon Clough, who would typically prepare for the programme by completing the Times, Guardian and Financial Times crosswords.

Valerie Singleton and Hugh Sykes co-presented the show during the 1980s but had a difficult relationship. Singleton made a one-off return to PM on 29 February 2016 to co-present a special "Leap Day" programme, alongside Eddie Mair, and jokingly proposed marriage to him at the end of the programme.

The first Saturday edition was broadcast on 12 April 1998.

== Presenters ==
Years	Presenter	Current role
2018–present	Evan Davis	Lead Presenter (weekdays)
?-present	Caroline Wyatt	Lead Presenter (Saturday)
2003–2018	Eddie Mair	Presenter

Other past regular presenters of the programme include: Carolyn Quinn, Clare English, Nigel Wrench and Dan Damon.

== iPM ==
On 12 October 2007, the programme started an additional blog for a spin-off programme called iPM, broadcast on Saturdays at 5:30pm (immediately after the Saturday edition of PM) until 22 December and available as a podcast. 'Through the blog, iPM listeners could discuss ideas with the production team and comment on the stories being lined up for the following show – so what ended up on air was shaped by the listeners.

== Humour ==
Though predominantly consisting of serious news, the programme is known for occasional satirical commentary, both from the presenters and in letters from listeners.

In 2008 the programme renamed its financial news slot "Upshares, Downshares" and used the title music of the television drama Upstairs, Downstairs, composed by Alexander Faris. In 2009, variations on the tune performed by PM listeners in a variety of styles from bossa nova to heavy metal became a regular feature. This ended when the UK statistically left recession early in 2010. In October 2010, a compilation was released in aid of the Children in Need charity appeal, for which it raised over £70,000.

== Production ==
PM's production team also produce Radio 4's The World at One, The World This Weekend and Broadcasting House programmes.

A Radio Times poll in 2005 named Eddie Mair as the fifth most powerful person in radio.

== Awards ==
The programme won two accolades in the 2007 Sony Radio Academy Awards: Gold in the Interactive Programme Award, and Silver for Speech Programme.

== See also ==
- The Today programme, Radio 4's early morning stablemate to PM.
- The World at One, Radio 4's afternoon stablemate to PM.
- The World Tonight, Radio 4's late-evening stablemate to PM.

Analogous programmes include PM on ABC Radio National in Australia and All Things Considered on NPR in the United States.
