= World at One =

BBC news radio program

- Logo for the World at One
- Other names: WATO
- Genre: News and current affairs
- Running time: 45 minutes
- Country of origin: United Kingdom
- Language: English
- Home station: BBC Home Service (1965–1967); BBC Radio 4 (since 1967)
- Hosted by: Sarah Montague (Mon–Thu); Jonny Dymond (Fri)
- Edited by: Natasha Shallice
- Recording studio: Broadcasting House
- Original release: 4 October 1965
- Website: www.bbc.co.uk/programmes/b006qptc
- Podcast: www.bbc.co.uk/programmes/b006qptc/episodes/downloads

The World at One (or WATO, pronounced "what-oh") is BBC Radio 4's long-running lunchtime news and current affairs radio programme, broadcast weekdays from 13:00 to 13:45 and produced by BBC News. The programme describes itself as "Britain's leading political programme. With a reputation for rigorous and original investigation, it is required listening in Westminster".

From 7 November 2011, the programme was extended in length from 30 minutes to 45 minutes.

== History ==
The programme began on 4 October 1965 on the BBC Home Service and its launch is considered to have been key in making news programmes "appointment to listen" broadcasting. As the then head of BBC Radio, Jenny Abramsky, noted, the programme started at a time when the Today programme was still in a magazine format. The World at One "broke new ground in news broadcasting and was one of the reasons why radio is still important today", helping establish a form of current affairs programme that influenced the creation of Newsnight in 1980 and Channel 4 News in 1982.

The launch of The World at One was part of a wider change in BBC news and current affairs coverage; more journalists were arriving from Fleet Street and replacing a more sedate and collegiate culture. John Timpson said that by 1966 or 1967, "[a]n Oxbridge accent was no longer as important as a good contacts book, a shrewd eye for a new angle, and a skin like a rhinoceros" and that the news offices "no longer had the leisurely atmosphere of a club smoking room".

The programme had attracted criticism as it seemed to blend together news and current affairs, and break down the distinction made between reporting and interpretation. David Hendy, in Life on Air: A History of Radio Four, said that this change was more a change in aesthetic than it was in underlying organizational structure: "by allowing the programme presenter to write and deliver the headlines, it did appear to blur it [the distinction between news and comment] on air".

In his history of radio news and current affairs, "Public Issue Radio", Hugh Chignell pointed out that The World at One was a highly successful but also a profoundly controversial innovation. It provided a successful approach to news and current affairs which would be cloned elsewhere but at the same time it horrified the more Reithian wing of the BBC, who reacted in the 1970s by creating single subject current affairs programmes (Analysis and File on 4) in reaction to The World at One's "vulgar" journalism. That vulgarity was personified by its first presenter, William Hardcastle, who was a former editor of the Daily Mail and had also been Washington Correspondent for Reuters. The Radio Academy Hall of Fame says he "had a businesslike, but warm, broadcasting voice, and a style that emphasised fact rather than comment, bringing some Fleet Street urgency to the radio presentation of news". Hardcastle did not want to do the programme every day, so Andrew Boyle suggested he share the job with William Davis, another presenter whose career did not wholly depend on the BBC.

The programme was a success from the start. Over two million people were tuning in by the end of 1965, and would eventually reach four million by 1975.

In 1998, the then Controller of Radio 4, James Boyle, reduced the duration of the programme from 40 to 30 minutes as part of a series of schedule changes.

The World at One is still known for its robust journalism. After a short introduction to the programme, there is a six-minute news bulletin, followed by serious political interviews and in-depth reports.

Robin Day, James Naughtie and Nick Clarke are some previous presenters of the programme.

From late 2005, Shaun Ley presented the show while Clarke recovered from an operation to amputate his left leg. Clarke returned part-time in August 2006. Other stand-in presenters have included Brian Hanrahan, Guto Harri, Laura Trevelyan, Stephen Sackur, Carolyn Quinn, James Robbins and Mark Mardell. The main presenter until March 2018 was Martha Kearney, who presented from Monday to Thursday, with Ley usually in the chair on Friday. In April 2018 Sarah Montague took over the lead presenting role from Kearney, who left to take over Montague's previous role as part of the Today team.

In 2012 and 2014 the programme was nominated as one of the best news and current affairs programmes in the Radio Academy Awards.

The previous week's programmes can be listened to again using BBC Sounds or downloaded as a podcast.

Many reporters and producers have spent some time working on the programme, including Sue MacGregor, Kirsty Wark, Jonathan Dimbleby, Roger Cook, George Alagiah, Jenny Abramsky, Roger Hearing, Sian Williams, Kirsty Lang, Martin Fewell, Shelagh Fogarty, David Jessel, Nick Ross, Ben Bradshaw, Susannah Simons, Pallab Ghosh and Martha Kearney.

== Presenters ==
Years	Presenter	Current role
2018–present	Sarah Montague	Main presenter, Monday-Thursday
2020–present	Jonny Dymond	Friday presenter and relief presenter

=== Notable previous presenters ===
- William Hardcastle (1965–75)
- William Davis (1965–?)
- Peter Hobday
- Alan Watson
- Brian Widlake
- David Jessel (1970–72)
- Sir Robin Day (1979–87)
- James Naughtie (1988–94)
- Nick Clarke (1994–2006)
- Martha Kearney (2007–2018)
- Shaun Ley (2005–2018)
- Mark Mardell (2014–2020)
- Edward Stourton (2020–2026)

== The World This Weekend ==
The World This Weekend
- Genre: Politics and current affairs
- Running time: 30 minutes (Sunday)
- Country of origin: United Kingdom
- Language: English
- Home station: BBC Home Service (1967); BBC Radio 4 (1967–present)
- Hosted by: Jonny Dymond
- Edited by: Natasha Shallice
- Recording studio: BBC Television Centre (until Dec 2012); Broadcasting House (Dec 2012 onwards)
- Original release: 17 September 1967
- Website: https://www.bbc.co.uk/programmes/b006qnz4

The World This Weekend is a weekly news and current affairs programme broadcast from 13:00 to 13:30 on Radio 4 every Sunday. It was launched on 17 September 1967.

Since the departure of Mark Mardell as the programme's main presenter in 2020, it has frequently been presented by Jonny Dymond, and Edward Stourton until his death in July 2026.

=== Presenters ===
Years	Presenter	Current role
2020–present	Jonny Dymond	Regular presenter

Past presenters include:

- James Cox (1994–2005)
- Nick Clarke (1989–1994)
- Gordon Clough
- Shaun Ley (2007–2014)
- Mark Mardell (2014–2020)
- Edward Stourton (2020–2026)

== See also ==
- Today – Radio 4's early morning stablemate to The World at One.
- PM – Radio 4's early evening stablemate to The World at One.
- The World Tonight – Radio 4's late evening stablemate to The World at One.
