= List of former BBC newsreaders and journalists =

Employees of British broadcaster

This is a list of newsreaders and journalists formerly employed by BBC Television and BBC Radio.

The BBC has employed many journalists and newsreaders to present its news programmes as well as to provide news reports and interviews. The following list names individuals who are no longer employed by the BBC in its news division BBC News.

== A ==
- Christa Ackroyd – main presenter on Look North from 2001 until 2013. She had previously been a presenter on Yorkshire Television's Calendar during the 1990s.
- Kate Adie – chief news correspondent for BBC News during which time she became well known for reporting from war zones around the world – her first major assignment was reporting on the Iranian embassy siege in London in 1980. She currently presents From Our Own Correspondent on BBC Radio 4.
- Robin Aitken – BBC journalist since 1978. Left in 2005, ending his career on BBC Radio 4's Today. Aitken published Can We Trust the BBC? (Continuum Press) in February 2007, which asserted the BBC was guilty of an "unconscious, institutionalised Leftism"
- George Alagiah – longtime chief presenter of BBC News bulletins on BBC One and BBC World News. Before becoming a presenter, he was Developing World correspondent, based in London, and then Southern Africa correspondent in Johannesburg. As one of the BBC's leading foreign correspondents, he reported on events ranging from the genocide in Rwanda to the plight of the Marsh Arabs in southern Iraq to the civil wars in Afghanistan, Liberia, Sierra Leone and Somalia. He died in 2023 after a long battle with cancer.
- Juliet Alexander – presenter of Ebony 1982–1990 the BBC's first Black news and current affairs magazine TV programme. Reporter on John Craven's Newsround. Presenter of Black Londoners on BBC Radio London. Presenter of Songs of Praise. Reporter on BBC Newsround SE. Presenter on Woman's Hour BBC Radio 4. Presenter of After Sugar What? A Radio 4 series about diversification in the Caribbean. Presenter of Careering Ahead.
- Kay Alexander – main presenter on Midlands Today. She retired in 2012 after nearly 40 years of continuous service.
- Linda Alexander – reporter and presenter on Newsnight from 1980 until 1983. She died in 2015. She was married to the BBC's former political editor David Holmes.
- Kenneth Allsop – reporter for Tonight in the 1960s. He died in 1973.
- Uduak Amimo – presenter, producer and correspondent of the BBC World Service programme Focus on Africa and BBC Network Africa from 2002 until her departure from the BBC in 2011.
- Marjorie Anderson – leading BBC radio broadcaster on the World War II BBC Forces Programme, and from 1945 on the BBC Light Programme. She died in 1999.
- Durdana Ansari, OBE – spent 22 years producing, directing, and interviewing personalities for the following BBC World Service programmes: The World Today, Asian Network (Urdu), Outlook, Meridian, English Teaching Programme and BBC Urdu Service. Currently an entrepreneur, public speaker and activist for female empowerment.
- Natalia Antelava – former BBC correspondent, co-founder of journalism start-up Coda Media where she is editor-in-chief.
- Alice Arnold – newsreader, mainly on BBC Radio 4 from 2004 to 2012. She is married to sports presenter Clare Balding.
- Michael Aspel – one of the early BBC television newsreaders, together with Robert Dougall, Richard Baker and Kenneth Kendall. He has since hosted This is Your Life and Antiques Roadshow and he hosted the children's programmes Crackerjack and Ask Aspel during the 1970s, as well as quizzes such as Give Us a Clue and Child's Play during the 1980s.
- Mark Austin – former BBC journalist and sports correspondent for BBC News, from 1982 to 1986. He joined ITN in 1986 as sports correspondent. Now works for Sky News.
- Khalid Aziz – main presenter and reporter on Look North in Leeds during the 1970s and early 1980s. He left to join TVS on its inception in 1982.

== B ==
- Terry Baddoo – reporter and presenter on Newsround during the late-1980s. He later worked as a sports presenter and reporter on BBC Breakfast and BBC World and presented World Sport on CNN International.
- Brian Baines – main presenter and announcer on BBC Look North during the 1970s and 1980s, eventually retiring from the programme in 1988. He died in 2006.
- Richard Baker – first to read the BBC TV news in 1954 (in voiceover). He continued to work as a newsreader until his retirement in 1982. He also presented the BBC's coverage of the Proms, as well as Start the Week and Baker's Dozen on Radio 4, in addition to narrating the children's series Teddy Edward and Mary, Mungo and Midge for the BBC. He died in 2018.
- Joan Bakewell – worked on BBC Radio 4 and Newsnight on BBC Two. She also presented Late Night Line Up during the 1960s and Heart of the Matter during the 1980s. She was created Baroness Bakewell in 2011.
- Matt Barbet – presenter on BBC London and previously Radio 1's Newsbeat until he moved to Five News in October 2007.
- Gareth Barlow – presenter on BBC Radio 4's Farming Today and BBC World Service before joining the BBC News Channel. In August 2023 he came to international attention following a blooper he made while presenting a late night BBC news programme. Starting the 10pm bulletin, he said "I'm watching– I'm watching BBC News? I'm Gareth Barlow. You're watching BBC News." Joined Sky News to present the network's breakfast show alongside Kay Burley.
- Michael Barratt – main anchor on Nationwide from 1969 until 1977, having previously worked as a reporter on Midlands Today. He also presented a number of other television and radio programmes, including Songs of Praise and Gardeners' Question Time. He was married to fellow-former Nationwide presenter Dilys Morgan. He died in 2022.
- Brian Barron – long-serving BBC foreign correspondent, reporting from many war-zones and trouble-spots around the world during the 1980s and 1990s. He died in 2009.
- Paul Barry – reporter and presenter on The Money Programme, Newsnight and Panorama from 1978 until 1986. He then moved to Australia, where he has since continued his journalistic career.
- Raymond Baxter – long-serving presenter and commentator on many significant BBC outside broadcasts, usually alongside Richard Dimbleby, most notably the Coronation of Queen Elizabeth II in 1953 and the funerals of King George VI and Winston Churchill in 1952 and 1965 respectively. He was best known as the main presenter on Tomorrow's World from 1965 until 1977. He died in 2006.
- Sue Beardsmore – long-serving presenter of the regional news programme for the Midlands: Midlands Today, from 1983 until 2003.
- Bruce Belfrage – announcer and newsreader on BBC radio during the Second World War. He became famous for having read the nine o'clock news on 15 October 1940 when Broadcasting House was hit by a German bomb: Belfrage carried on as if nothing had happened. He died in 1974.
- Martin Bell – prolific world affairs correspondent covering many conflicts in 30 years as a reporter until leaving the BBC in 1997 to become a politician
- Chris Bickerton – presenter of the BBC World Service programme Focus on Africa for 30 years in the 1970s and 1980s. He died in 2002.
- Ashley Blake – presenter and reporter on BBC London News and Watchdog during the early 2000s: he also briefly presented Breakfast. He then presented Midlands Today in his native Birmingham, until he was sacked in 2009 following a criminal court case.
- Rachael Bland – originally worked as a presenter on BBC Radio Wiltshire, before moving to BBC Radio 5 Live and to the BBC News Channel, where she worked as a relief and weekend presenter. In 2011, she became a main presenter on North West Tonight, while continuing to work on Radio 5 Live. She died in September 2018, following a well-publicised battle with breast cancer.
- Jasmine Bligh – one of the first three BBC Television Service presenters in the 1930s. She died in 1991.
- Claire Bolderson – presented Newshour on BBC World Service and The World Tonight on BBC Radio 4. Left on 20 March 2012
- Jennie Bond – main co-presenter of the Six O'Clock News and royal correspondent for BBC News for 13 years until 2003.
- Anna Botting – originally worked for Granada Television, before becoming a reporter for BBC North in 1991, and then a main presenter on Look North. She left in 1995 to become a presenter on Sky News, where she continues to work to this day. She is the daughter of Louise Botting.
- Louise Botting, CBE – presenter of BBC Radio 4's Money Box from 1977 to 1992. She is the mother of Anna Botting.
- Frank Bough – long-serving presenter on Nationwide and the first main anchor on Breakfast Time. He was also the main anchor on Grandstand during the 1970s and early-1980s and he later hosted the BBC's Holiday programme. He died in 2020.
- Bernard Braden – eponymous presenter of Braden's Week, a consumer affairs programme, which ran from 1967 until 1972. He had previously presented On The Braden Beat, a very similar show, which ran on ITV from 1962 until 1967, and he was well known as an actor and comedian. He died in 1993. He was married to fellow television presenter Barbara Kelly.
- Melvyn Bragg – began as a BBC general trainee in 1961 and then worked in the World Service, the Third Programme and the Home Service. He was later a presenter on Start the Week from 1988 until 1998, but he is best known as the presenter and editor of LWT's The South Bank Show from 1978 until 2010. He was created Baron Bragg in 1998.
- Chris Brasher – athlete, and reporter for Tonight in the 1960s. He died in 2003.
- Julian Bray – freelance news and current affairs, lifestyle broadcaster from 1970 to 1984, on various programmes including Late Light Extra on the BBC Light Programme, BBC World Service and BBC Radio London. Bray is now an aviation and aviation security expert, and broadcasts from his home studio in Peterborough.
- Noreen Bray – main presenter on Wales Today during the 1980s. She also occasionally presented Songs of Praise.
- Fern Britton – originally worked for Westward Television, before joining the BBC in the early 1980s as a newsreader on News After Noon and Breakfast Time. She later went on to host Ready Steady Cook, This Morning and That's What I Call Television
- Michael Buerk – originally a reporter, most notably on the Ethiopian famine in 1984, and later a newsreader; presenter of the Ten O'Clock bulletin from 2000 to 2003.
- Roland Buerk – former BBC Tokyo correspondent, and son of Michael Buerk.
- Paul Burden – business reporter on Look North Manchester, which later became Look North West and then North West Tonight, during the 1970s. He became a BBC national newsreader and financial journalist in 1983, including presenting Business Breakfast, remaining in these roles until 1999. He also presented the Today programme and PM on BBC Radio 4.
- Sir Alastair Burnet – presenter and reporter on Panorama and general election coverage during the early 1970s: he also presented coverage of Princess Anne and Captain Mark Phillips' wedding in 1973. He rejoined ITN in 1976 as a main anchor on News at Ten, remaining there until his retirement in 1991. He died in 2012.
- Gordon Burns – main anchor on North West Tonight from 1997 until his retirement in 2011. He had previously worked for Ulster Television in his native Belfast and he also worked on Granada Reports and World in Action. During his career, he interviewed eight British prime ministers. He is also well-known as the long-serving original host of the ITV quiz The Krypton Factor from 1977 to 1995. Other quizzes he has hosted include Password, A Word in Your Ear and Relatively Speaking.

== C ==
- Sue Cameron – presenter of Newsnight during the 1990s. She has also presented Channel 4 News.
- Sue Carpenter – relief co–presenter on News After Noon and on Breakfast Time during the 1980s and was also a main presenter on Points West. She later joined ITN.
- Tom Carver – held various posts as foreign correspondent, before becoming Washington DC correspondent for eight years. Now works for Control Risks Group.
- Judith Chalmers – BBC announcer during the 1950s and 1960s: she had previously worked as a performer on Children's Hour from the age of 13. She also presented Woman's Hour and Family Favourites during the 1960s, but she is best known as the long-serving main co-presenter on ITV's Wish You Were Here...? from 1974 until 2003. She died on 21st May 2026. She was married to the sports commentator Neil Durden-Smith and their son is the TV presenter Mark Durden-Smith.
- Jonathan Charles – presented BBC World News, BBC News, and World News Today. He has also presented for BBC World News from the World Economic Forum in Davos, Switzerland, as well as HARDtalk, and BBC World Service programmes. Charles was a world affairs correspondent for the BBC, reporting from many conflict zones, including Iraq, Afghanistan, Chechnya and the Beslan school siege, as well as natural disasters. During his career as a journalist, Charles was based in several countries including Belgium, France, Germany and the USA. Now works as director of communications at the EBRD
- Michael Charlton – reporter and interviewer on Panorama 1962 – 1976. He also appeared on Newsnight and other BBC programmes.
- Christopher Chataway – athlete, and reporter on Panorama from 1956: he was also an ITN newscaster during its early days. He died in 2014.
- Adrian Chiles – presenter on Working Lunch from 1994 to 2007 and an occasional relief presenter on Breakfast. He is perhaps best known as the former main co-host of The One Show, which he left to present ITV's Daybreak.
- Nick Clarke – presenter of The World at One on BBC Radio 4 from 1994 until he died of cancer in 2006. He also worked front of camera on The Money Programme, Newsnight (both BBC2) and The World This Weekend (Radio 4).
- Gordon Clough – former BBC journalist and presenter of BBC Radio 4's The World This Weekend, PM, The World at One and Round Britain Quiz, the latter of which he was also the question-setter. Formerly worked for the BBC Russian Service, and spoke fluent Russian. He died in 1996.
- Pattie Coldwell – presenter and reporter on Nationwide: she also presented Open Air, Loose Women and Radio 4's You and Yours. She died in 2002.
- John Cole – BBC's political editor between 1981 and 1992. Died 2013.
- Michael Cole – joined the BBC in 1969 as a presenter and reporter on Look East. He then moved on to the national news, working in various reporting roles, and later as the BBC's royal correspondent during the 1980s. He left the BBC in 1988 in order to become the director of public affairs at Harrods.
- Stephen Cole – presenter on BBC World and of technology programme Click Online. Later with Al Jazeera English.
- David Coleman – veteran BBC sports commentator and presenter over more than four decades. He began as a newspaper reporter in his native Cheshire, then joined the BBC in Manchester, before moving to BBC Birmingham, where he worked as a news assistant and sports editor. He also worked on Sportsview, and then replaced Peter Dimmock as the presenter of Grandstand from 1958 until 1968. He also worked as a commentator, particularly on football and athletics, and he presented and/or commentated on all the Olympic Games from 1960 until 2000 inclusive, eight Commonwealth Games and seven World Cups. He also regularly presented Sportsnight from 1968 until 1972 and the quiz A Question of Sport from 1979 until 1997. In addition, he covered certain major news events, such as The Beatles' return to Britain from the US and the 1959 general election. He retired from the BBC after covering the Sydney Olympic Games in 2000, and was awarded the Olympic Order later that year. He died in 2013.
- Roger Cook – joined BBC Radio 4's The World At One in 1968 as a presenter and reporter and later worked on PM, Newsnight and Nationwide. He is best known for his long-running investigative ITV series The Cook Report, which ran from 1987 until 1998.
- Sue Cook – regular presenter on various current affairs programmes, including Nationwide and Breakfast Time, during the 1980s and 1990s. She has also presented a number of other programmes, including Children in Need, Pebble Mill at One and Crimewatch.
- Alistair Cooke – broadcaster, presented Letter from America until March 2004; he died later in the same month.
- Frances Coverdale – main co-presenter on News After Noon during the early 1980s. She also regularly presented the Nine O'clock News.
- Elizabeth Cowell – one of the first three presenters when the BBC Television Service started in 1936, and returned after the war in 1946. She died in 1998.
- Tom Coyne – main anchor on Midlands Today during the 1970s. He also worked for Tyne Tees Television in his native Newcastle upon Tyne and as a reporter on Nationwide. He died in 2015.
- John Craven – long-serving eponymous presenter of the pioneering children's news programme John Craven's Newsround from 1972 to 1989 – the programme was later renamed Newsround. He was also a regular co-presenter on Multicoloured Swap Shop and Saturday Superstore during this period. He left in 1989 to become the main anchor on Countryfile, which he still presents to this day. Prior to Newsround, he had worked for the BBC on Look North in Newcastle upon Tyne and Points West in Bristol.
- Vivien Creegor – main presenter on Points West during the 1980s. She also presented a number of other news bulletins on BBC Television and also on Radio 4. She left in 1988 to join the fledgling Sky News.
- Michael Crick – regular reporter on Panorama from 1990 and Newsnight from 1992, replacing Martha Kearney as the political editor on the latter programme in 2007. He had previously worked on Channel 4 News and he returned there in 2011 as its new political correspondent.
- Rob Curling – main co-presenter and sports presenter on BBC London Plus, which later became Newsroom South East, during the late 1980s and throughout the 1990s. He also hosted the popular BBC daytime quiz show Turnabout from 1990 until 1996. He is now a sports presenter on Sky News.
- Declan Curry – joined the BBC in 1994, working on BBC News, the BBC News Channel and on Breakfast, in which he regularly reported on happenings within the London Stock Exchange and other business news. He later became a presenter on Working Lunch from 2008 until 2014.
- Adam Curtis was That's Life. And made several documentary films.

== D ==
- James Dagwell – presenter and reporter for the BBC News Channel and BBC World News from 2007 to 2011.
- Nasteh Dahir – foreign correspondent for the BBC in Somalia, murdered in 2008.
- Jill Dando – originally a presenter on Spotlight before becoming a presenter of various national BBC News programmes, as well as others including Holiday and Crimewatch until her murder in 1999.
- Bob Danvers-Walker – regular announcer for BBC television and radio from 1943, including such programmes as Round And About and London Calling Europe. He was best known as one of the voices of the British Pathé newsreel from 1940 until 1970. He died in 1990.
- Sammy Darko – has worked across most media platforms from TV, radio and online for BBC World and BBC domestic audience.
- Jason Dasey – Australian sports presenter on BBC World News between 1994 and 1997, including Newsday with Philip Hayton. Later joined CNN International.
- David Davies – main anchor on Midlands Today from 1989 until 1994. He had previously worked for BBC Wales, Nationwide, Newsnight and Songs of Praise. He later worked in various senior roles within the Football Association from 1994 until 2006.
- William Davis – economics broadcaster and commentator. One of the original presenters of The Money Programme and BBC Radio 4's The World at One. He died in 2019.
- Sir Robin Day – political broadcaster and commentator, presenter of Question Time (1979–89). He was originally one of the first ITN newscasters on ITV's inception in 1955: he remained there until 1959, then joined the BBC, presenting many news and political programmes, including The World At One, Panorama and election night coverage from 1960 until 1987. He died in 2000.
- Wilfred De'Ath – BBC Radio producer and interviewer during the 1960s: he also reported on the counterculture for Radio 4 during the 1970s. He died in 2020.
- Frank Delaney – BBC correspondent in Dublin during the early 1970s, mainly reporting on the Troubles. He later hosted various literary programmes on both television and radio and was himself a much-published author. He died in 2017.
- Jack de Manio – announcer on the BBC's Home Service during the 1950s. He then became the main anchor on Today from 1958 until 1971. He died in 1988.
- Anne Diamond – originally worked as a reporter for BBC West during the 1970s, before becoming a presenter and reporter on ATV Today, which later became Central News. She then returned to the BBC as a co-presenter on News After Noon and a reporter on Nationwide, but later joined TV-am as its main co-anchor, alongside Nick Owen. The pair went on to host their own BBC chat show, Good Morning With Anne and Nick, from 1992 until 1996.
- David Dimbleby – veteran BBC presenter and journalist over six decades. He began as a reporter for BBC Bristol during the 1960s, later becoming a presenter on Yesterday's Men in 1971 and then a long-serving main anchor on Panorama. He also briefly presented Nationwide during the early 1980s, the BBC's election coverage for 10 years from 1979 and This Week Next Week from 1984 until 1988, and he commentated on many significant outside broadcasts, including the funerals of Diana, Princess of Wales in 1997, Queen Elizabeth the Queen Mother in 2002 and former Prime Minister Margaret Thatcher in 2013, following in the footsteps of his late father, Richard Dimbleby. In addition, he was the chairman of Question Time from 1994 until 2018. He is the brother of fellow journalist Jonathan Dimbleby.
- Richard Dimbleby – BBC's first war correspondent, and then its leading TV news commentator in the 1950s and 1960s, as the presenter of Panorama. He was the main commentator, usually alongside Raymond Baxter, on many significant outside broadcasts, most notably The Queen's Coronation in 1953 and Sir Winston Churchill's funeral in 1965: he died later that latter year. He was the father of David Dimbleby and Jonathan Dimbleby.
- Peter Dimmock – veteran BBC sports journalist and senior television executive. He joined the BBC in 1946 as the head of outside broadcasts and was responsible for organising the televised coverage of major events such as the 1948 London Olympics, The Queen's coronation in 1953 and the first televised Grand National in 1960, until his retirement from that role in 1972. He also presented the sports programme Sportsview from its inception in 1954 until 1964, and he was the first-ever presenter of both the first BBC Sports Personality of the Year award in 1954 and Grandstand in 1958. He continued to work for the BBC in other roles until 1977. He died in 2015. He was married to the BBC announcer and reporter Polly Elwes.
- Peter Donaldson – long-serving newsreader and announcer on BBC Radio 4. He died in 2015.
- Mike Donkin – joined the BBC in 1975, originally working on Radio 4's Today, then on BBC Television News as world affairs correspondent throughout subsequent decades. He died in 2007, following a short illness.
- Robert Dougall – one of the first BBC Television newsreaders along with Richard Baker and Kenneth Kendall. Later a presenter of programmes for people in retirement. He died in 1999.
- Alan Douglas – main presenter and correspondent on Reporting Scotland from 1978 to 1996. He left to join Scottish Television.
- Komla Dumor – presenter on BBC World News and BBC News Channel until he died suddenly on 18 January 2014. He was the first presenter of Focus on Africa which he presented until the day before his death. Following his death the BBC named the Komla Dumor Award for exceptional talent in telling African stories after him.
- John Dunn – announcer on BBC domestic radio during the 1960s, and later on Radio 1. He also worked as an announcer and newsreader on Radio 4 during the mid-1970s, but was best known for his long-running drive time radio programme, which began in 1976. He died in 2004.

== E ==
- David Eades – long-serving presenter on BBC World News, until January 2023. Also presented BBC Radio 4's The World Tonight for six years, as well as Newshour, and previously held the posts of Europe, Ireland, and Senior Sports News Correspondent.
- Chris Eakin – presenter of Look North from 1990 to 1997, presented on the BBC News Channel from 1997 to 2015, including many reports from Northern Ireland in the early part of this period and occasional appearances on BBC Weekend News from 2013 to 2015.
- John Edmunds – TV newsreader from September 1968 until September 1973, and then again in October 1974 and between September 1979 and June 1981. He also presented the BBC's regional London TV magazine, Town And Around in 1968-1969. He died in 2023.
- Gwenan Edwards – presented on the BBC News (TV Channel) from 2000 to 2007. Before that she co–anchored BBC Newsroom South East from 1993 to 2000. She presented for BBC World News from 1994 to 1998. She also presented UK Today until it was discontinued. She presented the BBC travel programmes "Gate 24" and Fast Track (British TV programme) as well as classical music programmes, BBC Cardiff Singer of the World Competition and BBC Proms.
- Huw Edwards – former chief presenter and presented the BBC's coverage of major royal events and election presenter, main presenter of the BBC News at Ten on BBC One, and other appearances on the BBC Weekend News, BBC News at Six, BBC News at One, and Daily Politics. Resigned owing to alleged sexual misconduct.
- Sara Edwards – main presenter on Wales Today during the 1990s and early-2000s, leaving the programme in 2007. She had previously worked for Capital Radio, Radio 4 and HTV West.
- Tom Edwards – presenter of the BBC East regional opt-outs on Today during the 1970s. He was also a disc jockey on BBC Radio 1 and BBC Radio 2, but he is probably best known as an announcer on Thames Television, ATV and HTV West during the 1980s.
- Polly Elwes – reporter on the BBC news programme Tonight from 1959 to 1962. She died in 1987. She was married to the television executive and sports presenter Peter Dimmock.
- Mike Embley – joined the BBC in 1983, working for BBC Wales's Wales Today. Following a brief spell at ITN, he joined BBC News as reporter in 1995, and remained there for two years until he became the main presenter of Newsroom South East, the BBC's regional news programme for London and the South East of England. He then became the main overnight presenter from 2001 on BBC News Channel and BBC World News until retiring in 2021.
- Fred Emery – reporter on Panorama throughout the 1980s. He was previously a newspaper journalist and he worked in many troublespots throughout the world, including Vietnam during the Vietnam War.
- Gavin Esler – joined the BBC in 1977 and worked as a regional reporter in Northern Ireland, presenter on Newsroom South East in the mid-1980s, and the BBC's Washington correspondent in 1989. He was one of the launch presenters on the BBC News Channel, then known as BBC News 24, in 1997, co-presenting the very first show with Sarah Montague. He was also a main presenter on Newsnight 2003–2014, a presenter on BBC News at Five, The Film Review and Dateline London, 2008–2017.
- Julie Etchingham – presenter on Newsround during the mid-1990s. She later joined Sky News and Five News, but has been a main presenter on ITV News since 2008.

== F ==
- Bernard Falk – regular reporter and presenter on 24 Hours during the 1960s and Nationwide during the 1970s. He also presented Start the Week on Radio 4 and the BBC's early-1980s challenge quiz Now Get Out of That. He died in 1990.
- Lynn Faulds Wood – presenter on Breakfast Time from 1984 to 1986, but she was best known as the main co-presenter (with her husband, John Stapleton), of Watchdog, from 1985 until 1993. She died in 2020.
- Adrian Finighan – presenter on BBC News 24 and BBC World until early 2006 when he left for CNN International. Subsequently, he left for Al Jazeera English in 2010.
- Roger Finn – presenter and reporter on Newsround during the late-1980s and early-1990s. He later joined BBC South Today, which he still occasionally presents to this day.
- Stephanie Flanders – joined the BBC in 2002 as a presenter and reporter on Newsnight and Panorama, and also as an occasional relief newsreader on other main news bulletins. She became the corporation's economics editor in 2008, remaining in this role until 2013. She is the daughter of the singer and performer Michael Flanders, of Flanders and Swann fame.
- Tom Fleming – long-serving BBC radio and television commentator on major state occasions, such as royal weddings and funerals and the annual Remembrance Sunday ceremony. He was also an actor and director. He died in 2010.
- Sean Fletcher – sports news presenter from 2005 to 2011. Left to join Sky Sports News
- Anna Ford – presenter of the BBC Six O'Clock News from 1989 until 1999 and the One O'Clock News from 1999 until 2006. She had also worked across other BBC News programmes, having been the first female newsreader at ITN. She left the BBC in 2006.
- Frederick Forsyth – joined the BBC in 1965 as assistant diplomatic correspondent, initially covering French affairs, then the Nigerian Civil War in 1967. He is best known as a prolific thriller novelist: his works include The Day of The Jackal and The Odessa File. He died in 2025
- Marian Foster – long-serving presenter on Pebble Mill At One from 1972 until 1986. She later presented gardening reports for Look North.
- Max Foster – business reporter and presenter on Breakfast until he left for CNN International in 2005
- Jonathan Freedland – news reporter on BBC radio and television, particularly on The World at One and Today during the early 1990s.
- John Freeman – presenter on Panorama during the 1950s. He also served as the Labour MP for Watford from 1945 until 1955, but he was probably best known for his controversial series Face to Face (1959–1962), in which he conducted very probing interviews with famous people of the time, including Tony Hancock, Gilbert Harding and Adam Faith. Freeman later became the chairman of LWT, in 1971. He died in 2014.
- Matt Frei – former BBC southern Europe correspondent, Asia correspondent and Washington DC correspondent, and the main presenter of BBC World News America. Later the Washington correspondent and now co-presenter of Channel 4 News
- Bob Friend – joined the BBC in 1969 and regularly reported from various locations around the world over the next two decades, including Northern Ireland, Vietnam, Tokyo and New York. He later became a main presenter on Sky News. He died in 2008.
- Sir David Frost – presented Breakfast with Frost from 1993 to 2005. Later joined Al Jazeera English. Died in 2013.
- Hilton Fyle – presenter of BBC World Service breakfast programme for Africa, Network Africa, during the 1980s and 1990s.

== G ==
- Kate Gerbeau – read the headlines on Breakfast until she moved to Five News in 2005.
- Charles Gibson – presented ABC World News with Charles Gibson from 2007 to 2009.
- Frank Gillard – worked as a BBC war correspondent from 1941 until 1945. He later became the director of the BBC's western region, and then the director of radio, a role he held from 1964 until 1969. He died in 1998.
- Andrew Gilligan – journalist implicated in the Hutton Report of 2003 following his report on BBC Radio 4's The Today Programme regarding the content of a British government briefing paper. Resigned following publication of the report's findings in the same year. Now with Press TV
- Margaret Gilmore – former BBC security correspondent
- Fran Godfrey – newsreader on BBC Radio 2, who became famous for reading the news bulletins on Wake Up to Wogan from 1993 until 2008. She continued to present news bulletins for Radio 2 until she left the station in 2014. She joined Bauer Radio digital station Mellow Magic.
- Diana Goodman – appointed in 1986 as the BBC's first female foreign correspondent. Served as BBC correspondent in Bonn, Eastern Europe (based in East Berlin) and Moscow.
- Felicity Goodey – long-serving presenter and reporter for BBC North West. She left journalism in 1998 to become a founder director of the Northwest Regional Development Agency.
- Joanna Gosling – long-serving presenter on the BBC News Channel until February 2023.
- Harry Gration – one of the main anchors for the BBC Yorkshire regional magazine programme Look North, until his retirement in October 2020. He had also previously been a main presenter on South Today and an occasional stand-in presenter on Grandstand. He died in 2022.
- Charlotte Green
- Debbie Greenwood – presenter on BBC Breakfast Time during the 1980s. She is married to fellow television presenter Paul Coia.
- Freddie Grisewood – BBC radio announcer from 1929 up to the 1960s. He died in 1972.
- Krishnan Guru-Murthy – main presenter and reporter on Newsround from 1991 to 1994. He left to become a producer and reporter on Newsnight and a presenter on BBC News 24. He then joined Channel 4 News, which he still presents to this day.

== H ==
- Peter Haigh – In–vision announcer for BBC Television in the early 1950s, before moving to Come Dancing. He died in 2001.
- Yalda Hakim – Presenter and foreign correspondent on BBC World News. Left the BBC in 2023 to join Sky News.
- Stuart Hall – presented regional news programmes for the BBC in North West England in the 1960s and 1970s, while becoming known nationally for presenting It's a Knockout. Jailed on sex abuse charges in 2014.
- Vincent Hanna – reporter and famously incisive interviewer, originally on Panorama during the 1970s, then on Newsnight from 1980 until 1987, in which he covered political news and in particular the general election coverage, before being succeeded in the latter role by Peter Snow. He left to set up his own broadcasting company and to work for Channel 4. He died in 1997.
- Patrick Hannan – main presenter on Wales Today during the 1970s. He also worked as the BBC's political correspondent in Wales for 13 years, and he presented the BBC Radio 4 political and discussion programmes Out Of Order and Tea Junction. He died in 2009.
- Brian Hanrahan – long-serving BBC correspondent, reporting regularly both from home and abroad during the 1980s and 1990s, his final role being the BBC's diplomatic editor: he also occasionally presented The World At One on BBC Radio 4. He died in 2010.
- Will Hanrahan – presenter on Spotlight during the 1980s. He also worked as a national reporter for BBC News, mainly focusing on humanitarian crises, including the Rwandan Civil War. He also worked as an investigative journalist on Watchdog.
- Sally Hardcastle – former presenter on The World Tonight and Woman's Hour for BBC Radio 4. She died in 2014. She was the daughter of William Hardcastle.
- William Hardcastle – founder presenter of The World at One in 1965: he also presented PM. He died in 1975. He was the father of Sally Hardcastle.
- John Harrison - joined the BBC in 1983 as a special correspondent for the Nine O'Clock News. He also presented Brass Tacks, and was appointed South Africa Correspondent in 1991. He died in a car crash in South Africa in 1994.
- Derek Hart – presenter and interviewer on the BBC news programme Tonight in the 1960s. He died in 1986.
- Rosemary Harthill – BBC religious affairs correspondent, 1982–1988.
- Andrew Harvey – presenter of main news programmes including the BBC Six O'Clock News as main and co–presenter (1984–1996) as well as regional news programmes later including BBC Points West and South Today. Left to join ITN.
- Sir Max Hastings – former foreign correspondent on the BBC's Twenty-Four Hours, for which he reported from more than 60 countries and 11 wars. He is also a long-serving print journalist and a much-published author. He was knighted in 2002.
- Philip Hayton – originally with the BBC's Look North programme in Leeds, later a reporter for the BBC's national news programmes, main and co–presenter of the BBC Six O'Clock News (1987–1993), also presented the One O'Clock News, as well as the mid-1990s daytime quiz The Great British Quiz. Presented on BBC World and BBC News 24, resigning from the corporation in 2005 citing "incompatibility" with his new co–presenter Kate Silverton. He had been with the BBC for 37 years.
- Paul Heiney – reporter for Radio 1's Newsbeat from 1974 until 1976, then a reporter for Radio 4's Today from 1976 to 1978. He is best known as a presenter on That's Life from 1978 until 1982, and also for In At The Deep End, which he presented alongside fellow-That's Life presenter Chris Serle. Heiney is married to fellow-journalist Libby Purves.
- Rachael Heyhoe-Flint – former presenter on PM. She was best known as a cricketer and she worked as a sports journalist following her retirement from the sport, becoming Baroness Heyhoe-Flint in 2011. She died in 2017.
- Nicola Heywood-Thomas – presenter, sub-editor and reporter on BBC Wales Today and BBC Radio Wales - she also presented the Radio Wales arts show for 25 years. She also worked in similar roles on HTV. She died in 2023.
- Stuart Hibberd – radio newsreader from 1924 and chief announcer up to 1951 – he was one of the main newsreaders during the Second World War. He died in 1983.
- Celina Hinchcliffe – sports news presenter from 2002 to 2012. Left due to relocation of BBC Sport to Salford.
- Gerald Haycock – main presenter and reporter on BBC Points West during the 1980s and 1990s, having previously worked for ITN and HTV News at HTV West.
- Rico Hizon – presenter of Asia Business Report from 2003 to 2020 and Newsday from 2011 to 2020 at BBC World News. He is currently with CNN Philippines.
- Peter Hobday – long-serving main presenter on Radio 4's Today. He also presented Newsnight and The Money Programme. He died in 2020.
- McDonald Hobley – one of the first BBC Television continuity announcers, appearing from 1946 to 1956. He died in 1987.
- Triona Holden – joined the BBC in 1982 from print journalism, starting on radio before moving to TV. A news presenter and reporter, she covered the miners' strike of 1984–85, later writing Queen Coal: Women of the Miners, published in 2005, derived from her experiences. She was the youngest female national news reporter and the youngest person to present the Today Programme on Radio 4; presented the Six O'Clock News on BBC 1; PM on Radio 4; Newsbeat on Radio 1 and World TV News. In 1987 she was the only reporter to broadcast live from the disaster scene after getting onto the wreckage of the Herald of Free Enterprise when it became semi–submerged off Zeebrugge. She travelled extensively to war zones, famines, conflicts, and other disasters. before retiring on medical grounds aged 39 after suffering from systemic lupus erythematosus. She later became an artist.
- David Holmes – BBC's political editor from 1975 until 1980. He joined the BBC in 1956 and originally worked as a home news reporter, before becoming assistant political correspondent during the 1960s and deputy political editor in 1970. He died in 2014. He was married to fellow journalist Linda Alexander, who had been a presenter on Newsnight during the early 1980s.
- Bob Humphrys – regular reporter for BBC Wales programmes such as Wales Today and Week in Week Out, often alongside his brother, John Humphrys. During the 1990s, he specialised in sports commentary and reporting, particularly rugby. He died in 2008.
- John Humphrys – veteran BBC presenter, reporter and political interviewer. He began his career in the late 1950s as a trainee newspaper reporter in his native Cardiff, then he joined TWW, and was the first reporter on the scene of the infamous Aberfan disaster in 1966. He then joined the BBC, initially in the northwest region, then as a foreign correspondent, working mainly in the US and South Africa, throughout the 1970s, covering major events such as Richard Nixon's resignation in 1974 and Rhodesia's change in name to Zimbabwe. He became the BBC's diplomatic correspondent in 1980, then, from 1981 until 1987, the main presenter on the Nine O'clock News: he also frequently presented the One O'clock News, the Six O'clock News and Panorama. He joined Radio 4's Today in 1987 as the main co-presenter alongside the late Brian Redhead, and soon established himself as a tenacious political interviewer. He continued in this role until his retirement in September 2019. In addition, he regularly presented Week In, Week Out and the discussion programme Family Matters during the 1990s. He also presented the BBC's prestigious quiz Mastermind from its revival in 2003 until 2021, when he was replaced by fellow-journalist Clive Myrie. He is the brother of the late Bob Humphrys.

== I ==
- David Icke – former professional footballer, who became a regular reporter on Midlands Today during the late 1970s. He then worked as a regular sports presenter on national news programmes during the 1980s, including Newsnight and Breakfast Time. He later became a principal speaker for the Green Party.
- Razia Iqbal – former arts correspondent and main presenter of Newshour on the BBC World Service between 2011 and 2023.

== J ==
- David Jacobs – announcer with the British Forces Broadcasting Service during the war, a BBC staff announcer in the early 1950s, and later the presenter of Juke Box Jury. Also had a regular show on Radio 2. He died in 2013.
- Peter Jay – BBC's economics editor during the 1990s. He had previously been the main anchor on LWT's Weekend World in the 1970s and was the founding chairman of TV-am in 1983. He died in 2024.
- David Jessel – joined the BBC in 1967 as a trainee reporter for BBC Birmingham. He then worked as a reporter for The World at One from 1968 until 1972, before moving on to work on 24 Hours and its successor programmes throughout the 1970s and 1980s. He also presented Heart of the Matter alongside Joan Bakewell during the 1980s.
- Geoffrey Johnson-Smith – presenter and interviewer on the BBC news programme Tonight in the 1960s. He died in 2010.
- Anna Jones – presented the 9 – 1 pm shift with Philip Hayton on BBC News 24 from 2003. She had been with the channel since its 1997 launch, originally as a business presenter. She left in 2005, after 12 years, to become a presenter on Sky News.
- Sally Jones – became BBC Breakfast's first female sports presenter in 1986 and continued in this role until the early 1990s. She also presented coverage of the 1988 and 1992 Summer Olympics. She was also a real tennis champion, winning the world championship in 1993 and the British and US Open championships.
- Darren Jordon – originally sports correspondent on BBC News 24, he moved within the department to present BBC Breakfast and was later deputy presenter of the BBC One O'Clock News and weekend bulletins. He left in October 2006 to become a presenter on the Al Jazeera English service, based in Doha.
- Gillian Joseph – read the headlines on Breakfast as well as occasionally presenting the main programme. She also worked for BBC London. She left for Sky News in 2005.

== K ==
- Vincent Kane – long-serving presenter and reporter for BBC Wales – he presented Wales Today from 1986 to 1993.
- Natasha Kaplinsky – presenter on BBC Breakfast from 2002, when she joined from Sky News, until 2005, and then the BBC Six O'Clock News from 2005 until 2007. While with the BBC she also appeared the One and the Ten O'Clock bulletins, as well as presenting on Children in Need. She left to become the face of Five News in October 2007, and is now the President of the British Board of Film Classification.
- Robert Kee – long-serving presenter and reporter on Panorama. He was also one of the first presenters on TV-am. He died in 2013.
- Bridget Kendall – BBC's Moscow correspondent from 1989 until 1994, when she became Washington correspondent. She then worked as the BBC's diplomatic correspondent from 1998. In 2016, she became the first female Master of Peterhouse College, Cambridge, but she continues to broadcast for the BBC as an external contributor.
- Kenneth Kendall – first to read the news in front of a camera on BBC Television in 1955. He retired from the BBC in 1981 and subsequently presented Treasure Hunt on Channel 4. He died in 2012.
- Sir Ludovic Kennedy – television journalist and documentary maker. He presented the BBC's flagship current affairs programme Panorama, and he also chaired the television review series Did You See...? from 1980 until 1988. He had also previously worked as an ITN newscaster and reporter. He was knighted for his services to journalism in 1994. He died in 2009. He was married to the actress and dancer Moira Shearer.
- Sarah Kennedy – presenter on Sixty Minutes from 1983 until 1984. She has presented many other programmes, including the quizzes Game for a Laugh and Busman's Holiday, but is perhaps best known for hosting her own show on Radio 2.
- Richard Kershaw – presenter and reporter on various current affairs programmes, including Panorama, Nationwide and 24 Hours during the 1970s and 1980s. He died in 2014.
- Tasmin Lucia Khan – presenter of 60 Seconds on BBC Three and E24 on News Channel 2007–2010. Left to join Daybreak on ITV
- Keith Kyle – reporter for the BBC's Tonight programme from 1960, specialising in coverage of Africa and was based in Nairobi. He died in 2007.

== L ==
- Bob Langley – joined the BBC as a presenter and reporter on Nationwide in 1970, having previously worked for Tyne Tees Television in his native Newcastle upon Tyne. In 1972, he became one of the first presenters on Pebble Mill at One, which he continued to host into the 1980s.
- Sue Lawley – presented Nationwide during the 1970s, then the Nine O'Clock News (1983–84) and the Six O'Clock News at its launch in 1984 alongside Nicholas Witchell. She went on to present Desert Island Discs from 1988 until 2006, but has now left the BBC.
- Jan Leeming – BBC newsreader in the 1980s, covering most of the main bulletins. She had previously been a presenter on Pebble Mill at One, Westward Television and HTV News.
- Martyn Lewis – first presenter of the One O'Clock News in 1986, having previously worked for ITN. He also presented the Six O'Clock (1994–1999) and Nine O'Clock News until 1994, and he hosted the BBC2 quiz Today's The Day during the 1990s. He left BBC News in 1999.
- Sharanjit Leyl – Presenter for BBC World News based in Singapore. Joined BBC in 2003 and left the corporation in 2021.
- Alvar Lidell – BBC radio announcer and newsreader during the Second World War and thereafter. He retired in 1969 and died in 1981.
- Richard Lindley – regular presenter and reporter on Panorama during the 1970s and 1980s. He later became a presenter on ITV's This Week and he had originally worked as an ITN reporter during the 1960s. He died in 2019.
- Judi Lines – main presenter on Look East during the 1970s and 1980s.
- Lynette Lithgow – joined BBC News as a newsreader in 1988, working mainly on daytime and evening bulletins, and on BBC2's Newsview: she joined the BBC's world television service on its launch in 1991. She had previously worked as a presenter on Midlands Today and as a continuity announcer for Granada Television during the 1980s. She was murdered in her native Trinidad in 2001.
- Sue Lloyd-Roberts – worked as a special correspondent for the BBC, travelling to, and reporting on, major news stories across the world, including important issues not covered widely elsewhere. Died of leukaemia on 13 October 2015.
- David Lomax – joined the BBC as a reporter on Nationwide and was later a long-serving reporter on Panorama during subsequent decades. He died in 2014.
- Alex Lovell – presenter of BBC Points West between 2005 and 2023. Joined ITV News West Country and will make her on-air debut on 2 January 2024.
- Chris Lowe – joined the BBC as a graduate journalism trainee in 1972. At one time a presenter of PM (Radio 4), he was also a main co-presenter on BBC Breakfast News, the Six O'Clock News and News After Noon: he then worked on BBC News channel from 2000 until his retirement in January 2009.
- David Loyn – joined the BBC in 1987 as a TV correspondent. He then worked in various roles, including that of India correspondent in 1993, replacing Mark Tully, and international development correspondent, a role he held until 2015. During his tenure, he reported from various conflict and disaster zones, especially in Africa and the Middle East, and he covered major stories in other areas, such as the fall of the Berlin Wall, the war in Romania and the conflicts in Kosovo.
- Desmond Lynam – main presenter of Today on BBC Radio 4 from 1974 to 1976 and presenter of the Sportswide section of Nationwide from 1977 to 1983. He is best known as the long-standing main anchor on Grandstand from 1979 to 1999 and on various other sports programmes until he moved to ITV Sport in 1999. He has also presented the BBC's Holiday programme, How Do They Do That? Countdown and Sports Mastermind.

== M ==
- Donald MacCormick – main presenter on Newsnight during the 1980s: he also presented the Money Programme. Later moved to London Weekend Television. He died in 2009.
- Cathy MacDonald – main presenter on Reporting Scotland during the late 1980s.
- Sue MacGregor – long-serving main presenter on Radio 4's Today from 1984 until 2002. She had previously worked as a reporter on The World at One and she was also a presenter on Woman's Hour during the 1970s and 1980s.
- Liz MacKean – former Newsnight correspondent who presented the earliest reports about the widespread abuse perpetrated by former TV star Jimmy Savile. Died in 2017.
- Donny MacLeod – presenter on Nationwide from 1970 until 1972, before becoming one of the first presenters on Pebble Mill at One, which he hosted until his death in 1984. He also presented The World's Strongest Man in 1982 and 1983.
- Simon McCoy – presenter on BBC News, moved onto GB News to present an afternoon show on 25 March 2021.
- Diana Madill – presenter on Today in Parliament and a relief newsreader on the BBC's Six O'Clock News during the 1990s.
- Magnus Magnusson – presenter and reporter on Tonight during the 1960s. He was best-known as the original host of the BBC's prestigious quiz Mastermind, a role that he held from 1972 until 1997. He died in 2007. He was the father of fellow journalist Sally Magnusson.
- Sally Magnusson – main presenter on Breakfast Time and Breakfast News during the 1980s and 1990s. She has also presented Sixty Minutes, Songs of Praise and Reporting Scotland. She is the daughter of the late Magnus Magnusson.
- Eddie Mair – originally worked on BBC Scotland as a presenter on Reporting Scotland, and on Radio Scotland, presenting Good Morning Scotland and Eddie Mair Live, in the late 1980s. He later became a main presenter on Radio 4's PM, and also on Newsnight and BBC Three's The 7 O'Clock News. He left to join LBC in August 2018.
- Mary Malcolm – one of the first two regular female announcers on BBC Television after World War II, and into the 1950s. She died in 2010.
- Tom Mangold – regular reporter on Twenty–Four Hours and Panorama during the 1970s. He was also a reporter on Watchdog during later decades.
- Laurie Margolis – long-serving BBC News reporter and news editor. He is best known for having broken the news of the Argentinian invasion of the Falkland Islands on Radio 4's PM in 1982.
- Mary Marquis – main presenter on Reporting Scotland from its inception until 1988
- Bryan Martin – BBC Radio 4 announcer who announced the death of Elvis Presley in 1977, news of the Iranian Embassy Siege in 1980, and became the network's senior newsreader.
- Ian Masters – long-serving main anchor on Look East during the 1970s and 1980s.
- Lucy Mathen – first dedicated reporter on Newsround, from 1976 to 1980, and the BBC's first-ever female British Asian to front a major national television programme. She later trained as an ophthalmologist and has worked in this role in India since 1996: she launched the non-profit organisation Second Sight in 2000.
- Glyn Mathias – former political editor of both BBC Cymru Wales and ITN
- Maxine Mawhinney – joined the BBC in her native Belfast, working on both television and radio, then worked for Ulster Television and ITN, later joining Sky News on its launch in 1988. She returned to the BBC as a newsreader for BBC World in 1996 and was the duty newsreader at the time of the death of Diana, Princess of Wales in 1997. She then joined BBC News Channel and later presented Breakfast and BBC News at One. She left the BBC in April 2017.
- Laurie Mayer – regular co–presenter on various news programmes in the 1980s, including News After Noon and the Six O'Clock News, as well as BBC Breakfast News. He has also presented South East Today.
- Mike McCarthy – main presenter and reporter on Look North until he joined Sky News in 2000.
- Simon McCoy – presenter on BBC Breakfast and BBC News 24 from 2004 until 2006. He then became a presenter on BBC Weekend News and later presented BBC News at Ten and BBC News at One. He left the BBC in 2021 in order to move onto GB News.
- Paul McDowell – presenter and reporter on John Craven's Newsround from 1979 until 1985. He succeeded Lucy Mathen as the programme's dedicated reporter in 1980.
- Steph McGovern – regular business presenter and frequent main presenter on BBC Breakfast from 2011 to 2019. She previously worked as the main producer of financial news on Radio 4's Today programme, before becoming the lead producer of business news on the BBC's One, Six and Ten O'Clock News, working alongside Robert Peston. She also presented Watchdog and Shop Well For Less from 2016. She moved to Channel 4 in 2019 to host The Steph Show, later renamed Steph's Packed Lunch.
- Cathy McGowan – entertainment correspondent for Newsroom South East during the late 1980s. She was also a main presenter on the ITV pop magazine Ready Steady Go! from 1963 to 1966.
- Lee McKenzie – presented Inside F1 and was the F1 news correspondent until BBC pulled out of covering the sport on TV in 2015. Now with Channel 4 and BBC Sport.
- Robert McKenzie – interviewer and presenter, especially of general election results. He died in 1981.
- Norris McWhirter – sports journalist and commentator for the BBC: he first came to public attention when he was the timekeeper for Roger Bannister's four-minute mile in 1954, and he was part of the BBC's commentary team for its Olympic Games coverage from 1960 until 1976. He was best known as the co-founder (with his twin brother, Ross McWhirter), of the Guinness Book of Records, and for his regular appearances alongside Ross and main host Roy Castle on the BBC's Record Breakers. He continued to feature on the latter programme after Ross's murder in 1975, by the IRA, and became increasingly noted for his ability to spontaneously recall records set in virtually all fields when requested to do so by the studio audience. He died in 2004.
- Cliff Michelmore – 1950s TV producer who went on to present Tonight, Twenty–Four Hours and other news and current affairs programmes in the 1960s. Later presented the Holiday programme on BBC One. He died in March 2016.
- Guy Michelmore – main anchor on Newsroom South East during the 1990s. He is the son of Cliff Michelmore.
- Graham Miller – reporter for BBC Radio Birmingham in 1973. He then moved to BBC Radio London, before later joining Anglia Television: he continued to work in various roles for ITV, but mainly as a sports presenter and reporter. He now runs the independent media and communications business, MediaVu.
- Rosie Millard – BBC's arts correspondent between 1995 and 2004. She left following a clampdown on freelance writing.
- Stephen Milligan – presenter on BBC Radio 4's The World Tonight from 1980 until 1983. He left to join The Sunday Times, but returned to the BBC in 1988, serving as their Europe Correspondent. He also served as the Conservative MP for Eastleigh from 1992 until his sudden death in 1994.
- John Milne – long-serving main presenter on Reporting Scotland from 1972 until 2007. He died in 2014.
- Louise Minchin - long-serving presenter on BBC Breakfast. She was initially a stand-in presenter, before becoming a main anchor from 2012 until her departure from the programme in September 2021. During this time, she was also a presenter on the One O'Clock News and You and Yours.
- Rajesh Mirchandani – former news presenter on BBC News Channel and relief presenter of BBC World News America on BBC World News channel. Also former Washington, DC correspondent for BBC News.
- Ed Mitchell – presenter and reporter on Breakfast during the 1990s. He has also worked for ITN.
- Leslie Mitchell – first voice heard on BBC Television at its inception on 2 November 1936. After the war he moved to ITV. He died in 1985.
- Monty Modlyn – reporter and outside broadcaster for Radio 4's Today programme alongside Jack de Manio during the 1950s and 60s. He died in 1994.
- Jason Mohammad – joined BBC Wales in 1997 as a reporter for Wales Today, later becoming the anchor for Wales on Saturday. He became the presenter of BBC One's Final Score in 2013 and continues to present the programme to this day, as well as other sports-related shows.
- Chris Morgan – worked as a presenter and reporter for BBC Wales during the 1980s, most notably as a presenter on Wales Today. He left in 1990 to work for Thames News and TV-am. He died in 2008.
- Christopher Morris – newsreader on all national BBC television bulletins. He was main presenter on the day Lord Mountbatten was murdered by the IRA in 1979, recording the biggest–ever audience, 26 million, for a news bulletin as ITN was on strike. He joined the BBC in 1967 as news correspondent in Spain, reported from many countries and many wars as special correspondent until 1989 when he joined Sky News as senior presenter and foreign correspondent for 11 years. He rejoined BBC as News 24 presenter until becoming managing director of his own TV production company, OmniVision, at Pinewood Studios in 2000.
- Juliet Morris – originally worked for BBC South West before becoming a main presenter on Newsround from 1990 to 1995. She joined Breakfast and has also been a presenter on Countryfile.
- Kylie Morris – BBC's South East Asia correspondent until she moved to Channel 4 News in 2006. She later presented More4 News.
- Tony Morris – former reporter and presenter on BBC North West Tonight. He was later a main presenter on Granada Reports, from 2003 onwards. He died in 2020.
- Malcolm Muggeridge – veteran print journalist and writer, who frequently worked on Panorama during the 1950s and 1960s and was noted for being a very incisive interviewer. He died in 1990.
- John Mundy – presenter and reporter on BBC North West from 1974 until 1990.
- Dermot Murnaghan – main Breakfast presenter from 2002 until 2007, appearing alongside Natasha Kaplinsky and Sian Williams. He joined from ITV and also appeared on the BBC Six O'Clock News and the BBC Ten O'Clock News between 2004 and 2007 before leaving for Sky News.
- Denis Murray – joined the BBC in 1982; he worked as its Dublin correspondent until 1984, when he became Northern Ireland political correspondent, working in Belfast. He was appointed the BBC's Ireland correspondent in 1988 and continued in this role until his retirement in 2008.
- Jenni Murray – presenter on BBC Radio Bristol and South Today during the 1970s – she became a presenter on Newsnight in 1983, before moving on to the Today programme. She was best known as a long-serving main anchor on Woman's Hour, which she first presented in 1987. She died in 2026.

== N ==
- Andrew Neil – veteran journalist and broadcaster for 30 years on the BBC. He presented various political shows, including Despatch Box during the 1990s, and later Daily Politics, Politics Live, Sunday Politics and Straight Talk with Andrew Neil. He was also an occasional guest presenter on Newsnight from 2014, following Jeremy Paxman's departure, and he presented coverage for both the UK and the US elections, his last being the 2020 US election. He left the BBC that year in order to become chairman of GB News.
- Ron Neil – joined BBC Scotland in 1967 as a radio reporter, before moving onto Reporting Scotland, where he worked as a reporter until 1969. He then moved to the BBC in London, where he became a producer, and later output editor, on Nationwide, remaining there until 1976. He was the co-creator, and later editor, of Newsnight, the first editor on BBC Breakfast Time in 1983, and the founder-editor of the Six O'Clock News in 1984. He later became the BBC's director of news and current affairs, and eventually the first chief executive of production, before his retirement in 1998.
- Mike Neville – long-serving main anchor on Look North in Newcastle upon Tyne, from 1964 to 1996. He was originally a reporter for Tyne Tees and he returned to them in 1996, remaining there until his retirement in 2005. He was also a regular reporter on Nationwide. He died in 2017.
- Barry Norman – former print journalist, who became a presenter on Radio 4's Today in 1974 and Omnibus in 1982. He was best known as the long-serving presenter of Film... from 1974 until 1998. He died in 2017. He was married to the author Diana Norman.
- Charles Nove – joined BBC Radio in 1981 as a continuity announcer and newsreader, and he was also a regular announcer on BBC1. He was a regular newsreader on Wake Up to Wogan from 2007 until 2009, and continued to read the news on Radio 2 until 2012. He was later a continuity announcer on Radio 4, from 2018 until 2019, when he left to join Scala Radio.

== O ==
- Robin Oakley – BBC's political editor between 1992 and 2000. He later became the European political editor for CNN International.
- Olivia O'Leary – first senior female presenter on Newsnight, a role she held from 1985–1986. She had previously worked as a print journalist and radio and television presenter in her native Ireland.
- Rageh Omaar – joined the BBC in 1992 as a foreign correspondent. He then worked as Africa correspondent, and later covered the Iraq invasion. He left in 2006 to join Al Jazeera English. Since 2013 he has been with Sky News on lunchtime and evening programs.
- Robert Orchard – long-serving BBC correspondent. He joined BBC Wales in 1979, later becoming its political correspondent, then working in the same role for the national news. He became a BBC parliamentary correspondent in 1992 and frequently presented Yesterday in Parliament. He left the BBC in 2013.
- Susan Osman – main anchor on Points West from 1991 until 2005, later becoming a presenter on China Radio International. She had initially worked for HTV West and Channel 4.
- Jamie Owen – long-serving main anchor on Wales Today from 1994 until 2018. He had previously worked as a presenter on BBC Radio 4 and as a continuity announcer on Radio 2 and Radio 3. He also presented BBC Breakfast News and Songs of Praise. He left the BBC in 2018 to join the international broadcaster TRT World.
- Kevin Owen – presenter on Wales Today during the 1980s. He later worked as a main anchor for HTV Wales, HTV West, Channel Television and Sky News. He was a long-serving news anchor on the Russian global news channel RT, based in Moscow.
- Nick Owen – current main anchor on BBC Midlands Today. A co–presenter (with Anne Diamond) of TVam in the 1980s, the pair later had their own BBC daytime chat show Good Morning With Anne and Nick (1992–96).
- Dianne Oxberry – weather presenter and relief newsreader on North West Tonight from 1994 until her sudden death in 2019. She had previously worked on BBC Radio 1 and been a main presenter on the children's series The 8.15 from Manchester.

== P ==
- Shahnaz Pakravan – former presenter on BBC World and BBC News 24 – she also regularly presented Tomorrow's World and Woman's Hour. She had previously been a presenter on Channel 4 News and The Channel Four Daily.
- Ian Pannell – former Damascus correspondent known for covering the Syrian Civil War, later international correspondent based in Washington. Now with ABC News.
- Bruce Parker – long-serving main anchor on South Today, which he joined in 1967, later becoming the programme's political editor. He also worked as a reporter on national BBC News programmes and Nationwide during the 1970s, and he was the first host of The Antiques Roadshow.
- David Parry-Jones – long-serving main presenter on Wales Today and a regular sports commentator for BBC Wales, mainly specialising in rugby. He died in 2017.
- Jeremy Paxman – regular presenter on Newsnight between 1989 and 2014. He also presented the long-running quiz University Challenge on BBC2 from 1994 until 2023. It was announced on 24 September 2014 that he would anchor the UK general election coverage on Channel 4. He began his career in the 1970s as a reporter on BBC Northern Ireland and Panorama. He became a co-presenter on the Six O'Clock News in 1984 before becoming a main anchor on BBC Breakfast News, and he moved onto Newsnight soon after that.
- Brian Perkins – long-serving newsreader on Radio 4 from 1965 to 1969 and again from 1978 until his retirement in around 2010.
- Robert Peston – BBC's Business Editor for all main TV and radio news programmes from 2005 until 2014. He also worked as the corporation's economics editor from 2013 until 2015, after which he left to become ITV's political editor.
- Sylvia Peters – continuity announcer for BBC Television from 1947 to 1958. She died in 2016.
- Julian Pettifer – reporter for Tonight in the 1960s. He was later the host of the quiz Busman's Holiday during the late1980s, he narrated the BBC nature programme The Living Isles in 1986 and he presented the ITV series Nature Watch in the 1990s.
- Barnaby Phillips – BBC's Southern Africa correspondent from 2001 to 2006, and had worked for the BBC for 15 years, reporting from locations in several continents. He now works as Europe correspondent for the Al Jazeera English television network, initially based in its Athens bureau (2006–2010), and now based in London.
- Frank Phillips – BBC Radio newsreader and announcer during the 1940s, 1950s and 1960s. He was the first newsreader to append his name to the wartime bulletin in July 1940. He also announced the Labour election victory in 1945 on the midnight news.
- Wilfred Pickles – occasional newsreader on the BBC Home Service during World War II. He was also an actor and had presented his own BBC show Ask Pickles during the 1950s, as well as being the host of the radio series Have A Go from 1946 until 1967. He died in 1978.
- John Pienaar – deputy political editor for BBC News from 2015 until 2020. He originally joined the BBC in 1992 and worked on various news and current affairs programmes as both a presenter and reporter: these included Question Time Extra and Daily Politics. Since 2020 he has worked for Times Radio.
- John Pilger – reporter and documentary-maker on Midweek, 1972–73.
- John Pitman – long-serving BBC journalist: he originally worked on Braden's Week during the late 1960s, but later became best known as a regular reporter on Man Alive. He died in 2018.
- Martin Popplewell – regular presenter on BBC News 24 between 2002 and 2003. He now works for Sky News.
- Betsan Powys – joined BBC Wales in 1989 as a reporter and presenter for Wales Today. She took over editorial charge of all BBC Wales's daily political output in 2006, remaining in this role until 2013, when she became editor of programmes for BBC Radio Cymru: she left this latter post in 2018. She has also presented the Welsh-language version of Mastermind.
- Gerald Priestland – foreign correspondent and, later, a religious commentator for the BBC. He died in 1991.
- Libby Purves – presenter on Radio 4's Today during the late 1970s; she also presented Radio 4's Midweek for 30 years. She is married to fellow journalist Paul Heiney.

== R ==
- Steve Race – main presenter on PM from 1970 until 1972. He was best known as a composer and presenter of music programmes, mainly on radio, and in particular as the long-serving host and pianist on the Radio 4 quiz My Music. He died in 2009.
- Dame Esther Rantzen – presenter and reporter on Braden's Week and Man Alive during the 1960s and 70s, and she later had a consumer spot on BBC Breakfast Time in the 1980s, but she is best known both as the main presenter on That's Life! from 1973 until 1994, and for having set up Childline in 1986. She was appointed Dame in 2015. She was married to fellow-journalist Desmond Wilcox and is the mother of the actress Rebecca Wilcox.
- Adam Raphael – presenter on Newsnight from 1987 until 1988. He is best known as a newspaper journalist, working on various newspapers both before and after this period.
- Huda al-Rasheed – presenter on BBC Arabic from 1974 until after 2018.
- Brian Redhead – co–presenter of Today on BBC Radio 4 from 1975 until 1993, shortly before his death in January 1994.
- Susanna Reid – main co-presenter on BBC Breakfast from 2003 until 2014. She left to become a co-anchor on Good Morning Britain.
- Lee Ridley – worked with BBC News Online before becoming the first standup comedian in Britain to use a communication aid in his routines, performing them under the stage name of Lost Voice Guy. He rose to prominence in June 2018 upon winning the 12th series of Britain's Got Talent and a comedy on BBC Radio 4
- Caroline Righton – presenter on BBC London Plus from 1985 to 1987. She left to become a presenter on TV-am, but later returned to the BBC to present daytime and Breakfast Time news bulletins.
- Angela Rippon – the first female newsreader of the BBC Nine O'Clock News when she was appointed in 1975. Later joined TV-am and presented many other shows, including Masterteam, What's My Line? and Crufts. She now co-presents the BBC's Rip Off Britain alongside Gloria Hunniford and Julia Somerville.
- Daniela Ritorto – presented overnight bulletins on BBC World News, BBC News Channel and BBC One, as well as Impact, GMT, Outside Source and World News Today. Now with SBS News.
- Debbie Rix – regular presenter and newsreader on BBC Breakfast Time during the 1980s.
- Fyfe Robertson – reporter for Tonight in the 1960s. He died in 1987.
- Max Robertson – first regular presenter on Panorama from its second edition in 1953. He was also a commentator at the funeral of King George VI in 1952 and the coronation of Queen Elizabeth II the following year. In addition, he was a regular sports commentator, particularly on tennis, and he hosted the antiques quiz Going for a Song from 1965 until 1977. He died in 2009.
- Robert Robinson – main presenter on Today on BBC Radio 4 alongside John Timpson during the early 1970s, and a regular presenter of Stop The Week. He is perhaps best known for having presented three quizzes for BBC television and radio for more than 15 years each, namely Ask The Family, Call My Bluff and Brain of Britain. He died in 2011.
- Michael Rodd – presenter on BBC Look North during the late 1960s – he also presented the BBC's coverage of early space shuttle launches. He is best known as the original presenter on the children's film quiz Screen Test (1970–79) and as a presenter on Tomorrow's World (1972–82) and The Risk Business (1980–81).
- Abdul Samad Rohani – head of the BBC World Service's Pashto service in Helmand Province, Afghanistan; murdered in 2008.
- Helen Rollason – presented Newsround during the late 1980s. She left in 1990 to become the first female presenter on Grandstand and she regularly read the sports bulletins on BBC news programmes during the rest of the 1990s. She died in 1999 following a long and well-publicised battle with cancer.
- Nick Ross – long-serving presenter and reporter on various BBC radio and television programmes, including Today, The World at One, Man Alive and Sixty Minutes. He was also one of the first presenters of BBC Breakfast Time in 1983, but he is probably best known for having presented Crimewatch for 23 years, from 1984 until 2007.
- Jacky Rowland – BBC foreign correspondent in the Balkans and Middle East in the late 1990s. From 2003 she has been working for Al Jazeera English TV.
- Angus Roxburgh – BBC's Moscow correspondent from 1992 until 1998, when he became a Europe correspondent, based in Brussels. He was previously a newspaper journalist and has written books and television and radio documentaries on Russia.
- Joshua Rozenberg – presenter and reporter for the BBC from 1975 until 2000, specialising in legal affairs.
- Kevin Ruane – BBC's Moscow correspondent from 1977 to 1980, when he became Eastern European correspondent from 1980 to 1986. He died in 2018.

== S ==
- Vaughan Savidge – former freelance newsreader for BBC Radio 3, continuity announcer for Radio 4 and World Service. He left the corporation in spring 2018.
- Diane Sawyer – presented ABC World News with Diane Sawyer from 2009 to 2014 (which was also broadcast on BBC TV), until she stood down in August 2014.
- Selina Scott – one of the first main presenters on Breakfast Time on its launch in 1983. She had previously been a newsreader on ITN's News at Ten and later went on to co-present The Clothes Show.
- Hugh Scully – originally a presenter on Spotlight for BBC South West during the late 1960s, before becoming a main presenter on Nationwide during the 1970s and early 1980s: he was also the first presenter of its spin-off consumer affairs programme Watchdog. He was probably best known as the longest-serving host of The Antiques Roadshow throughout the 1980s and 1990s. He died in 2015.
- Tim Sebastian – joined BBC News in 1979 as its Warsaw correspondent, later becoming Europe correspondent, Moscow correspondent and eventually Washington correspondent from 1985 to 1989. He also presented the BBC's HARDtalk from 1997 until 2005. Joined Deutsche Welle.
- John Sergeant – joined the BBC in 1970 and worked as a reporter in various roles, most notably as the BBC's chief political correspondent from 1992 to 2000: he also presented Today and The World at One on Radio Four. He left the BBC to become ITN's political editor, but has since returned to the BBC as a reporter and stand-in-presenter on The One Show. He is the father of the journalist Mike Sergeant.
- Babita Sharma – presenter on BBC World News.
- Adam Shaw – main presenter on Working Lunch from 1994 until 2008, when he was replaced by Declan Curry. He also presented business news bulletins on Today.
- Kate Silverton – 2005–2021: BBC News Channel, BBC News at One, BBC Weekend News
- John Simpson – veteran BBC correspondent with a career spanning more than five decades. He originally joined BBC Radio News in 1966 as a trainee sub-editor, then became a BBC reporter in 1970, reporting from many danger-zones throughout the world. He became the BBC's political editor in 1980, presented the Nine O'clock News from 1981 until 1982 and became the diplomatic editor in the latter year. He was made the corporation's world affairs editor in 1988, and he has since continued to report on many major world events, including the Beijing Tiananmen Square massacre in 1989, the fall of Ceausescu in Bucharest later that year, the Gulf War in 1991 and the Kosovo War in Belgrade in 1999. He has also occasionally presented Newsnight and other news bulletins over the years.
- Valerie Singleton – presenter on the late evening TV programme Tonight from 1975. She was also a regular anchor on Nationwide, PM and The Money Programme, and had previously spent 10 years as a presenter of Blue Peter.
- Peter Sissons – presenter of the BBC's Six O'Clock News from 1989 until 1993, and of the Nine O'Clock News and the Ten O'Clock News between 1993 and 2003: he also presented Question Time from 1989 until 1994. He had previously worked for ITN: he joined in 1964, working initially as a foreign correspondent, until he was shot and seriously injured while covering the Biafran War in Nigeria in 1968. He then worked as ITN's industrial correspondent during the 1970s, and he became one of the main newscasters on News At One in 1976. He was the first main anchor on Channel 4 News from 1982 until 1989, when he was succeeded by Jon Snow. Sissons died in 2019.
- Martin Sixsmith – long-serving foreign correspondent, most notably as the BBC's Moscow correspondent during the 1980s and 1990s. He left the BBC in 1997.
- Clive Small – long-serving foreign correspondent, most notably as the BBC's Southern Africa correspondent from 1974-77 (reporting on the Rhodesian insurgency, the civil war in Angola, and the Soweto uprising in 1976) and its North America correspondent from 1977-1985. He gained a scoop when in April 1980, a member of President Carter's staff phoned after midnight to report the disastrous failure of Desert One, the airborne attempt to rescue 50 American hostages in Iran.
- Mike Smartt – presented Breakfast News as it was then, the One, the Six, the Nine and summaries in the 1980s and 1990s, as well as being a correspondent at home and abroad, covering many of the major stories at the time. He was asked to lead the team putting BBC News Online in 1997, and served as editor–in–chief of BBC News Interactive until 2004 when he left the corporation. Smartt now lectures and writes on journalism and new media.
- David Smeeton – journalist who reported from Tokyo and Bonn and was an education reporter, home affairs correspondent, education and local government correspondent and west of England correspondent. He died in 2020.
- Mike Smith – regular presenter on BBC Breakfast Time during the 1980s. He was best known as a radio and television disc jockey, and for co-hosting The Late, Late Breakfast Show alongside Noel Edmonds, as well as hosting several other quiz shows. He was also a qualified helicopter pilot and a regular participant in motorsports. He died in 2014. He was married to the actress and fellow-television presenter Sarah Greene.
- Rodney Smith – presented The Financial World Tonight and other programmes on Radio Four from 1978 to 1985. After spells with ABC News and later, CNN International, he returned to the BBC where he presented programmes and contributed to political and economic output at the BBC World Service.
- John Snagge – radio newsreader and commentator from the 1920s to the 1960s. He died in 1996.
- Raymond Snoddy – original presenter of NewsWatch from its inception in 2004 until 2012, being succeeded by Samira Ahmed. Snoddy, also a thrice published author; now works freelance for the print news media.
- Peter Snow – originally an ITN newscaster, he joined the BBC in 1979 as the first presenter of Newsnight, from 1980 until 1997, and he was an election analyst and co–presenter in the live general election results programmes at the BBC from 1983 to 2005, becoming especially famous for his use of the Swingometer. He also co-hosted Tomorrow's World during the late 1990s. He is the father of the historian Dan Snow, with whom he has co-presented several history programmes, including Battlefield Britain, and the cousin of fellow journalist Jon Snow.
- Julia Somerville – former BBC journalist, labour affairs correspondent and newsreader, who frequently presented the BBC Nine O'Clock News during the 1980s. She later moved to ITN, and subsequently returned to the BBC to co-host Rip Off Britain.
- Howard Stableford – stand-in presenter and reporter on Newsround in 1984. He also presented children's programmes, such as Beat The Teacher and Puzzle Trail, before becoming a long-serving presenter on Tomorrow's World, which he joined in 1985. He now lives and works in the USA.
- Judith Stamper – main presenter on Look North from 1980 until 1995.
- John Stapleton – reporter on Panorama and Newsnight during the early 1980s. He later became famous as the main co-presenter (with his wife, Lynn Faulds Wood), of Watchdog from 1985 until 1993. During this time, Stapleton also worked as a presenter on Breakfast Time.
- Michael Stewart – reporter for BBC radio news 1980–1984, and stand-in presenter for Today Programme 1982–1984 alongside John Timpson and Brian Redhead and also the PM programme with Valerie Singleton. He moved to BBC television news in 1984, initially reporting for the revamped BBC Breakfast Time. He was a general news reporter until 1990, including covering the fall of Romanian President Nicolae Ceaușescu in December 1989.
- Francine Stock – main presenter on Newsnight and The Money Programme during the 1990s.
- Moira Stuart – presented many of the main bulletins, including News After Noon, the Six O'Clock News and the Nine O'Clock News, during a long career. She was dropped from her weekend slot by the BBC in 2007, leading to accusations of ageism. She joined BBC Radio 2 in 2010, on which she had been a newsreader before her move into television. She had also been one of the original presenters on The Adventure Game in the early 1980s, shortly before her move into journalism.

== T ==
- Bolesław Taborski – BBC Polish Section arts editor and presenter for 34 years from 1959. He was a prolific poet, writer and literary translator and theatre theorist. A personal friend of John Paul II, he translated his dramas into English. He died in 2010.
- Asha Tanna – news correspondent. She left to become a weekend presenter for Five News in 2007.
- Philippa Thomas – presenter on BBC World News and BBC News Channel, and coverage of UK and US politics, best known for coverage of Monica Lewinsky Scandal that rocked Bill Clinton's presidency, as well as the 9/11 attacks and the fall out over the next decades up to the fall of Kabul in 2021, when she was the on duty presenter. While a Nieman Journalism Fellow (2010–2011) at Harvard University, studying digital media and citizen journalism, a blog post by Thomas reporting a comment by P.J. Crowley received wide coverage, and resulted in Crowley's resignation.
- Beverley Thompson – originally worked as a presenter and reporter on Wales Today, before becoming a main presenter on Points West. She then worked on Look North and South Today, eventually becoming a main presenter on South East Today from 2001 until 2009.
- Jeremy Thompson – reporter on BBC Look North in Leeds during the early 1970s, before moving on to become the BBC's first north of England correspondent in 1977. He joined ITN in 1982, initially as a sports correspondent. He joined Sky News in 1993, originally as head of its Africa bureau, based in Johannesburg. He presented the station's flagship news programme, Live at Five, from 1999 until his retirement in 2016.
- Debbie Thrower – relief newsreader on the One O'Clock and Nine O'Clock News and weekend bulletins during the late 1980s. She has also presented Breakfast Time, Songs of Praise, South Today and ITV's Meridian Tonight.
- John Tidmarsh – presenter on the BBC World Service programme Outlook from 1968 until 1998. He was also a BBC foreign correspondent, working from many countries, including France, Algeria, India, Pakistan and Lebanon. In addition, he frequently worked as a radio and television newsreader, and he occasionally stood in for Jack de Manio on the Today programme. He died in 2019.
- Andrew Timothy – announcer on the BBC Home Service from 1947 until 1959, becoming the BBC's chief announcer in 1964. In addition, he was one of the first BBC television newsreaders, from July to September 1954, and also the announcer on The Goon Show from 1951 until 1953. He died in 1990. He was the father of the actor Christopher Timothy, who featured in the BBC's All Creatures Great and Small and Doctors.
- John Timpson – presenter on Newsroom, the main BBC2 news programme, from its 1964 launch until 1970, when he joined BBC Radio 4's Today programme. He died in 2005.
- Alan Towers – main anchor on Midlands Today during the 1980s, having originally joined the programme in 1972 as a presenter and reporter: he eventually retired from the BBC in 1997. He had previously worked as a newsreader on Granada Television and ITN, and later as a reporter on Nationwide, in which he covered the skateboarding duck story. He died from cancer in 2008, aged 73.
- Polly Toynbee – BBC's social affairs editor from 1988 to 1995.
- Christopher Trace – presenter on Look East during the 1970s: he also worked on Nationwide during this period. He was previously an actor, but was best known as the first male presenter on Blue Peter from 1958 until 1967. He died in 1992.
- Sheila Tracy – one of the first presenters on Spotlight (originally called South West at Six) in the early 1960s. She later became the first female newsreader on Radio 4 in 1974. She died in 2014.
- Laura Trevelyan – News channel presenter and United States correspondent, left the corporation after 30 years in March 2023. Formed an organization named Heirs of Slavery.
- Deepak Tripathi – South Asia correspondent reporting from Afghanistan, India and elsewhere.
- Mark Tully – India correspondent until 1994.
- Denis Tuohy – presenter on the late evening TV programme Tonight from 1975, and a reporter on Panorama. He had also presented Late Night Line Up during the 1960s, and he was one of the first people to be seen on BBC2 on its launch in 1964.
- Bill Turnbull – main presenter on BBC Breakfast from 2001 until 2016. He had also presented the Six O'Clock News, Ten O'Clock News and News 24, as well as Songs of Praise. He later became a presenter on Classic FM. He died in 2022, following a long battle with cancer.
- Reg Turnill – BBC's air and space correspondent from 1958 until 1975, covering all crewed space flights as well as the introduction of passenger jets, including Concorde. After retiring from this role, he continued as Newsround's space editor until the mid-1980s. He died in 2013.
- John Tusa – main presenter of BBC Two's Newsnight programme from 1980 to 1986. He also presented the One O'Clock News during the 1990s.

== V ==
- Chris Vacher – main anchor on the BBC's Points West from 1983 until his retirement in 2011. He previously held the record as the longest–serving presenter on any British local news programme: however, this record has since been beaten by the former main anchor on Look East, Stewart White, who presented the latter programme from 1984 until 2021.
- Victoria Valentine (formerly Fritz) – news and business presenter at BBC World News and BBC Breakfast until 2023.
- Wynford Vaughan-Thomas – war correspondent at Anzio, and later a commentator at the Queen's coronation and similar events. He died in 1987.
- Michael Vestey – BBC foreign affairs and defence correspondent, and occasional presenter of The World Tonight, on Radio 4. He died in 2006, aged 61.
- Jeremy Vine – presenter of Jeremy Vine on Radio 2 and Panorama, known for exclusive reporting from war-torn areas throughout Africa in the 1990s. Also worked on Today, The Politics Show and Newsnight. Joined Channel 5's weekday morning current affairs show, formerly called The Wright Stuff. He is the brother of the comedian and actor Tim Vine.
- Suzanne Virdee – main presenter on Midlands Today from 2001 to 2012 and an occasional relief presenter on BBC Breakfast. She had previously worked for Central News.

== W ==
- David Walter – former BBC radio and television journalist, programme producer and Paris correspondent for BBC News – he had also worked for ITN. He died in 2012.
- Neville Wanless – newsreader and announcer for the BBC Home Service from 1961 until 1975, covering the regional opt-outs for the North East and Cumbria. He joined Tyne Tees Television in 1971 as a continuity announcer and newsreader, remaining in this role until 1991. He died in 2020.
- Susan Watts – science editor on Newsnight from 1995 until 2013.
- Bob Wellings – main presenter and reporter on Nationwide from 1971 to 1979. He had previously been a presenter on Look East and About Anglia, and he had also been one of Esther Rantzen's original co-presenters on That's Life! He later became a presenter on the BBC's daytime phone-in programme Open Air during the late-1980s. He died in 2022.
- Paul Welsh – originally worked as a reporter and presenter on Newsround during the early 1990s, then later became a reporter on Breakfast and a presenter on Newshour and The World Today. He later worked in various roles for BBC News, including World affairs correspondent, West Africa correspondent and defence and security correspondent, reporting on wars and disasters around the world. He left BBC News in 2006 to start his own production company.
- Charles Wheeler – veteran foreign correspondent and a presenter on Newsnight and Panorama. He joined the BBC in 1947 and became the corporation's longest-serving foreign correspondent, continuing in the role until his death in 2008
- Huw Wheldon – BBC broadcaster and executive in the 1950s and 1960s. He produced and presented programmes, notably the arts magazine Monitor. He died in 1986
- Alan Whicker – Army war reporter in Italy. After joining the BBC in 1957, he became an international reporter for Tonight. From 1958 on, he presented Whicker's World. He died in 2013.
- Stewart White – main anchor on Look East from 1984 until his retirement in 2021. He currently holds the record as the longest-serving newsreader on any British local news programme. He was previously a continuity announcer and presenter on ATV and its successor, Central Independent Television, during the late 1970s and early 1980s.
- Richard Whitmore – co–presenter of the BBC Nine O'Clock News with Peter Woods between 1973 and 1981, he was also the main presenter on News After Noon (1981–1986) and remained with BBC News until 1998.
- Brian Widlake – worked for the BBC in the 1970s and 1980s. Best known for co-presenting The Money Programme with Valerie Singleton. He died in January 2017.
- Desmond Wilcox – main presenter and co-editor of Man Alive during the 1960s: he was also a presenter on Sixty Minutes in the 1980s. He died in 2000. He was married to Esther Rantzen and the father of television presenter Rebecca Wilcox.
- Sian Williams – main presenter on BBC Breakfast from 2001 until 2012. She also presented many other main news programmes, including the One O'Clock News and Six O'Clock News. She now presents 5 News at 5.
- Nan Winton – BBC announcer and reporter on Panorama and Town and Around during the late 1950s, before becoming the BBC's first female newsreader in 1960. She was dropped from the role less than a year later, but continued to work on both television and radio as a reporter and interviewer throughout the 1960s. She died in 2019.
- Corbett Woodall – main BBC newsreader during the 1960s. After leaving the role in 1967, he presented Look East, worked regularly on the Today Programme and occasionally chaired editions of Any Questions? and Any Answers?. He was also an actor and appeared, invariably as a newsreader or announcer, in many television shows, particularly sitcoms, and films. He died in 1982.
- Peter Woods – co–presenter of the BBC Nine O'Clock News with Richard Whitmore between 1973 and 1981. He also presented the main BBC2 programme Newsroom from 1964 until 1973. He died from cancer in 1995. He was the father of Justin Webb.
- Glyn Worsnip – presenter and reporter on Nationwide during the 1970s, but he was probably best known as one of Esther Rantzen's co-presenters during the early years of That's Life!. He died in 1996.

== Y ==
- Alistair Yates – main presenter on BBC News 24 and BBC World Service during the 1990s and he later became a presenter on the BBC News Channel. He had previously worked as a newsreader on Midlands Today during the late 1970s, he presented several ITV regional programmes during the 1980s and he became the first male newsreader on Sky News in 1989. He died in July 2018.
- Jimmy Young – veteran BBC disc jockey and broadcaster. He originally presented Housewives' Choice on the Light Programme and then became one of Radio 1's first disc jockeys, lasting from 1967 until 1973. He then joined Radio 2, where he hosted his own lunchtime news and current affairs show from 1973 until 2002. He interviewed every British prime minister from 1964 until 2010 and was knighted for his services to broadcasting in 2002. He died in 2016.
- Martin Young – presenter and reporter on Look North during the early 1970s. He then joined Nationwide in 1973, remaining with the programme until 1979, and he also worked on Panorama during this period, and later on Newsnight.
- Hanna Yusuf – reporter and producer with BBC News. She died in September 2019.

== See also ==
- List of current BBC newsreaders and reporters
