= John Stuart Roberts =

Welsh writer and broadcaster

Reverend John Stuart Roberts (born c.1939) is a Welsh writer and broadcaster, best known as the producer of the BBC's Everyman and Heart of the Matter series. He was also a presenter of the long-running Songs of Praise.

Roberts was ordained as a minister in the Congregational Church before going into television, and is a Christian Socialist. He began his television career as Religious Broadcasting Organiser, and was later Head of BBC Radio. Huw Edwards, who sees him as a mentor, described him as "a free-thinking, provocative, unpredictable figure who openly despised the leaden ways of BBC management at that time".

Roberts's 1999 book about the writer Siegfried Sassoon was the first full biography of the subject, and gave some prominence to Sassoon's conversion to Catholicism in later life.

== Publications ==
- Siegfried Sassoon (1999)
