= News After Noon =

- Title card used from 1985 to 1986 (November 1985 Variant Picture)
- Created by: BBC News
- Presented by: Richard Whitmore; Moira Stuart; Frances Coverdale; Laurie Mayer; Sue Carpenter; Fern Britton; Anne Diamond; Judi Lines
- Theme music composer: George Fenton
- Country of origin: United Kingdom
- Original language: English

Production
- Running time: 20–30 minutes

Original release
- Network: BBC1
- Release: 7 September 1981 – 24 October 1986

Related
- The Midday News; One O'Clock News

News After Noon is a news bulletin that aired on BBC1 at lunchtime from 7 September 1981 to 24 October 1986.

== History ==
News After Noon launched on 7 September 1981 and replaced a shorter fifteen-minute lunchtime news bulletin called The Midday News. which had been on air since 1976. Broadcast at 12:30, it was initially billed as "the first television news of the day", as when the programme started breakfast television had not launched in the UK. The launch of the BBC's daytime television service saw News After Noon replaced by the One O'Clock News, and the final edition of News After Noon was broadcast on 24 October 1986.

== Format ==
News After Noon was the first BBC television news bulletin to last for a full thirty minutes – at the time, the Nine O'Clock News was 25 minutes in length. After 25 minutes of news there was a weather forecast, after which the regions left the programme for their lunchtime regional news bulletin. However, at this time, BBC South East did not broadcast regional news bulletins so the final three minutes of News After Noon, which consisted of a financial report and a recap of the news headlines with in-vision subtitles, was only seen in London and the south east. This continued until BBC South East launched a regional news bulletin on 2 September 1985, after which News After Noon lasted for 25 minutes and the weather forecast and the regional news bulletins airing after the programme ended.

== Presenters ==
Throughout its five years on air the programme had a two-person presentation team. Richard Whitmore normally presented the programme alongside either Moira Stuart or Frances Coverdale, although Coverdale became the main co-presenter towards the end of the programme's run. Both Whitmore and Stuart continued as daytime newsreaders after the end of News After Noon as they shared presentational duties of the hourly BBC News Summaries that formed part of the new daytime schedule. Other notable presenters included Laurie Mayer, Chris Lowe, Fern Britton, Sue Carpenter, Michael Cole and Anne Diamond.

== Broadcast times ==
News After Noon was broadcast in two time slots. Between September and May the programme ran from 12:30 until 13:00. However Pebble Mill at One did not broadcast during the summer and when it was not on the air News After Noon was shown between 13:00 and 13:30. Also, during the summer months, shorter editions of News After Noon, sometimes with one presenter instead of two, were broadcast when the BBC was showing live cricket coverage. This was to ensure that viewers did not miss the end of the morning's play and the start of the afternoon's play. On these days, News After Noon would last for twenty minutes instead of the usual thirty minutes.
