= Philip Hayton =

English television news presenter

- Born: Philip John Hayton; 2 November 1947 (age 78); Keighley, West Riding of Yorkshire, England
- Education: Fyling Hall School
- Occupations: News presenter, presenter
- Spouse: Thelma Hayton (m. 1972)
- Children: 2

Philip John Hayton (born 2 November 1947) is an English television news presenter, reporter and former international correspondent for BBC News. He worked for the BBC from 1968 until 2005. Hayton was a reporter and presenter for BBC Radio Leeds before reading the BBC Look North bulletin. He joined BBC News as a reporter in 1974 and was the presenter of the corporation's national news bulletins from 1984 to 1993. Hayton became the main presenter of the relaunched version of the regional nightly news bulletin BBC North West Tonight and worked on the international satellite channel BBC World from 1995 to 1998 and later BBC News 24 between 1998 and 2005, the year he left the corporation.

== Early life ==
Hayton was born on 2 November 1947, in the town of Keighley in West Yorkshire, England, to the Reverend Austin Hayton and Jennie Margaret Violet Hayton (née Errington). At the age of three, he moved to London with his parents, and he also spent much of his youth in the United States, deciding he wanted to become a journalist after watching American news broadcasts. Hayton decided he wanted to go back to Britain to obtain O-levels instead of American grades, and he was educated at Fyling Hall School, an independent school near Robin Hood's Bay, North Yorkshire.

== Career ==
Hayton worked various jobs such as a teacher for the British Council in Jordan in the Middle East until he returned to Britain after 12 months because of the Six-Day War, a foundry worker, a lavatory assembler, a valet, a doughnut salesman and advertising salesman. In early 1967, he began his broadcasting career as a pirate radio DJ on Radio 270, presenting two three-hour programmes a day on a converted Dutch herring boat off Bridlington Harbour. When offshore pirate radio stations were made illegal by the government and the station closed down as a result in August 1967, he joined BBC Radio Leeds as a tape reclaimer and organised the records for a presenter. Hayton later became a reporter and presenter in 1968 and left the radio station in 1971. He moved to BBC North in Leeds and presented the BBC Look North news bulletin from 1971 to 1974, after receiving an invitation to work in television for his coverage of the John Poulson fraud trial. Hayton made regular contributions to the Nationwide programme.

In 1974, Hayton became a national news reporter for BBC News, reporting on the Cod Wars, the 1983–1985 famine in Ethiopia, the fall of Idi Amin, the Iranian Revolution, the Rhodesian Bush War, the Ugandan Bush War, and the 1982 Kenyan coup attempt. He was dispatched to Belfast in Northern Ireland, covering The Troubles for two years and Beirut; he and his camera crew were injured in a landmine explosion in the Shouf mountains close to the village of Kfarmatta southeast of Beirut in February 1984 but no one was seriously hurt. He was appointed the BBC's Southern Africa correspondent in 1980, reporting on the 1981 Seychelles coup attempt as the first journalist who was permitted to enter the country, and was in South Africa for three years. Hayton also reported on the Falklands War from Argentina, and accompanied royal tours in Africa and the United States. From October 1988 onwards, Hayton presented the BBC's One O'Clock News nationally as the replacement for Michael Buerk, as well as becoming one of the main co-presenters of both the BBC's Six O'Clock News and the Nine O'Clock News programmes. In 1989, after the latter programme's change of presentation, he became one of its main solo presenters.

When his superiors did not renew his annual contact, he left national news for a short time to become the main presenter of the relaunched version of the regional nightly news bulletin BBC North West Tonight, BBC North's flagship news bulletin, from September 1993 after joining its news team two months earlier. After this stint that came to an end in 1995, Hayton began to present on the international satellite news channel BBC World starting from 1995 and, eventually, BBC News 24 between 1998 and 2005. In addition, he was the presenter of the BBC One daytime quiz programme entitled The Great British Quiz for two series from 1994 to 1995.

In 1989, Hayton narrated Video 125's "Chiltern Take Two" drivers eye view video. In September 2005, Hayton resigned from BBC News 24 six months into a year's contract, citing differences with co-presenter Kate Silverton. The Daily Telegraph, without substantiation and quoting an unnamed 'insider', reported that he turned to Silverton during a break and said "I don't like you". Hayton merely cited "incompatibility" with Silverton as his reason and when his managers refused to move Silverton to another time slot he left. Silverton was later in the peculiar position of having to go through the morning's paper review live on air the morning the story broke, avoiding any discussion of the story and chiding her new co-anchor when he looked to refer to it. Hayton said that he left the BBC "without bitterness or rancour".

In retirement, from 2007 onwards Hayton has been the regular host of Head2Head, a BrightTalk internet broadcast for Skandia in which he holds court between two financial figures.

== Personal life ==
Hayton describes his interests as walking, sailing and the theatre. He married his childhood sweetheart Thelma Susan on 22 December 1972. There are two children of the marriage.
