= Bob Wellings =

British television presenter (1934–2022)

- Born: Robert Arthur Wellings; 1 April 1934; Jerusalem, Mandatory Palestine
- Died: 1 March 2022 (aged 87); Halesworth, Suffolk
- Education: Downside School, Somerset
- Alma mater: Trinity College at the University of Cambridge
- Occupation: Television presenter
- Known for: Nationwide
- Spouse: Penny Tennyson (m. 1963; d. 1984)
- Children: 3

Robert Arthur Wellings (1 April 1934 – 1 March 2022) was a British-American television presenter who worked most notably on BBC current affairs television programme Nationwide.

== Early life ==
Wellings was born on 1 April 1934 in Jerusalem, Mandatory Palestine, son to Louise (née Dalzell) and Francis Wellings, a geologist for the Iraq Petroleum Company originally from Shropshire. The family lived in the Far East before moving to the United States as the Second World War broke out. Wellings, whose mother was from Texas, attended an American military school.

After the war in 1947, the family moved to Amersham, Buckinghamshire. Wellings attended Downside School in Somerset, where he boarded. He spent his National Service in the Royal Air Force (RAF) before reading English at Trinity College, Cambridge. It was at Trinity where Wellings appeared in Footlights amateur dramatic productions.

== Career ==
Wellings began his career as a hack writer of children's books and as a cartoonist for Tatler and Punch magazines using the moniker "Robert". He then taught at a boys' prep school in Stow-on-the-Wold, Gloucestershire.

In 1959, Wellings worked for Anglia Television's local news About Anglia in Norwich, as a reporter and presenter, after a chance meeting on a train with a senior executive. He joined the BBC Television's South regional news in 1964 before returning to Anglia from 1966 to 1969. Wellings returned to the BBC, working on Nationwide from 1970, remaining on the programme until 1979. Colleagues included Frank Bough and Sue Lawley. "As a Nationwide reporter, you had to be able to tackle anything, from interviewing, say, Edward Heath to some extraordinary animal," Wellings said in Let’s Go Nationwide, a 1991 documentary.

Wellings co-presented That's Life! in its first year, with the actor George Layton, in 1973. In 1979, despite having little knowledge or interest in pop music, Wellings co-hosted the British Rock and Pop Awards with David "Kid" Jensen; Clive James noted that Wellings was "square as a brick" – the only pop song Wellings knew, Baker Street by Gerry Rafferty, was one of the award winners.

After Nationwide, Wellings presented On the Town between 1980 and 1981 with Joan Bakewell, from 1983 to 1984 he was a reporter on Nationwide’s successor, Sixty Minutes, and a presenter on the newly launched regional news programme London Plus from 1984 to 1985. He then presented BBC 1's daytime Open Air programme with Eamonn Holmes and Pattie Coldwell from 1986 to 1989. In 1989, he filmed his last nationally screened series, The Solent Way. In 1989, he had a spell on radio, co-presenting the breakfast programme with Douglas Cameron on London Talkback radio. Later he joined Sky News.

Wellings played himself as a television interviewer in the BBC sitcom Don't Tell Father in 1992, and then in 1993 in the BBC satire If You See God, Tell Him and The Buddha of Suburbia.

== Personal life and death ==
Wellings married Penny Tennyson (born 1940), a secretary from Walberswick (and the great, great grand-daughter of the Victorian poet laureate Alfred, Lord Tennyson), in Norwich in 1963. The couple met through her step-father Michael Jeans, who worked for Anglia TV. They had two daughters, Emma and Sophie, and a son, Matthew. The marriage ended in divorce in 1984. Wellings had a keen interest in cars and the outdoors, visiting places in East Anglia or the east of England, and he retired to Halesworth, Suffolk. Wellings died on 1 March 2022 in his sleep at Beech House care home in Halesworth, after a fall which fractured his hip, at the age of 87.
