= BBC News at Six =

BBC's flagship evening news programme

- Title card used since 3 April 2023
- Also known as: BBC Six O'Clock News (1984–2008); BBC News at Six O'Clock (1999–2004)
- Created by: BBC News
- Presented by: Fiona Bruce; Reeta Chakrabarti; Jane Hill; Clive Myrie; Sophie Raworth
- Theme music composer: David Lowe
- Country of origin: United Kingdom
- Original language: English

Production
- Production locations: BBC Television Centre (1984–2013); Broadcasting House (2013–present)
- Camera setup: Multi-camera
- Running time: 30 minutes
- Production company: BBC News

Original release
- Network: BBC One; BBC News (UK feed)
- Release: 3 September 1984 – present

Related
- BBC Breakfast; BBC News at One; BBC News at Ten; BBC Weekend News

The BBC News at Six is the BBC's early evening news programme on the British television channels BBC One and BBC News (UK feed), broadcast weeknights at 6:00 pm and produced by BBC News. It is normally broadcast for 30 minutes, except on bank holidays when it may be shorter and only shown on BBC One. For a long period, the BBC News at Six was the most watched news programme in the UK but since 2006 it has been overtaken by the BBC News at Ten (10:00 pm). On average it is watched by four million viewers.

The programme is presented alternately by Fiona Bruce, Reeta Chakrabarti, Jane Hill, Clive Myrie and Sophie Raworth.

Since December 2007, the length of the programme was shortened from 30 minutes to 28 minutes to allow for a news summary being shown on BBC One at 7:58 pm.

On 8 May 2017, SBS in Australia began airing BBC News at Six during their English-language news programming segment. It is broadcast at 7:00 am every day on delay from Britain.

During the COVID-19 pandemic, the bulletin was extended to 33 minutes.

The programme is usually not broadcast on the international feed of the BBC News channel and is meant for UK viewers only. However, during special occasions or major stories such as UK government collapse, the programme is simulcast on the international feed, carrying BBC News at Six branding and title sequence, although listed on the guide as simply BBC News.

== History ==
The Six O'Clock News, as the bulletin was originally titled, was part of the second revamp of BBC1's early evening news and current affairs lineup in as many years. In October 1983, the BBC had replaced the long-running 5:40 pm BBC Evening News, as well as current affairs and regional news programme Nationwide, with Sixty Minutes, an attempt to integrate regional and national news and current affairs in a single broadcast; it began with a fifteen-minute news segment similar to the Evening News. However, it lasted less than a year, ending the following July, and for the next five weeks, the BBC Evening News was reinstated at 5:40 pm, finally ending on 31 August 1984.

A bulletin presented by Sue Lawley and Nicholas Witchell. This set design was in use from 3 September 1984 to 12 April 1993.

The new programme launched the following Monday, 3 September, and was originally presented by Sue Lawley and Nicholas Witchell with future Newsnight presenter Jeremy Paxman as the first relief newsreader. Andrew Harvey, Philip Hayton, and Frances Coverdale were also regular relief presenters in the early years. The new programme was twice as long as the previous bulletins, with a running time of 30 minutes.

In 1988, the Six O'Clock News studio was invaded during a live broadcast by a female group protesting against Britain's Section 28 (a law against the "promotion" of homosexuality in schools). Witchell grappled with the protesters and is said to have sat on one woman, provoking the memorable front-page headline in the Daily Mirror, "Beeb man sits on lesbian". Lawley left the Six O'Clock News later that year, followed by Witchell a year later, although he would return as a relief presenter intermittently until 1999. From 1989, the programme was mainly presented by two of Peter Sissons, Anna Ford, Andrew Harvey and Moira Stuart, with other BBC journalists such as Witchell, Hayton, John Humphrys, Michael Buerk, Jill Dando, Laurie Mayer, Mike Smartt and Chris Lowe also occasionally presenting.

On 13 April 1993, the bulletin was relaunched with a more coherent look that was adopted across all BBC newscasts on the same day. A year later, Sissons departed to present the Nine O'Clock News, swapping positions with Martyn Lewis. From 1994 to 1999 the programme was generally presented by Lewis as lead presenter of the programme on Monday, Tuesday and Friday, with Ford taking on the lead role on Wednesday and Thursday, although both would cover each other's absences. Stuart was co-presenter on Monday and Tuesday, Harvey on Wednesday and Dando on Thursday and Friday. Other BBC journalists, in particular Jennie Bond, covered in the absence of co-presenters, with future lead presenters Huw Edwards and Fiona Bruce making occasional appearances. Senior journalists, including Witchell, Sissons and John Humphrys would present as lead anchor when both Lewis and Ford were unavailable.

On 10 May 1999, the bulletin was relaunched again, along with the rest of the BBC News programmes and the new presenter was Huw Edwards with Fiona Bruce as the deputy presenter. During Bruce's maternity leave in 2001, Sian Williams, who was special correspondent for the programme at this time, covered as deputy presenter. Both Edwards and Bruce left the Six O'Clock News on 19 January 2003 to front the Ten O'Clock News.

On 20 January 2003, as George Alagiah and Sophie Raworth took over, the bulletin was relaunched along with the rest of BBC One's news bulletins. During Raworth's first maternity leave in 2004, Sian Williams stood in for her for over the six months. However, during Raworth's second maternity leave at the end of 2005, Natasha Kaplinsky stood in, originally as a temporary measure. As part of a presenter reshuffle in April 2006, Kaplinsky was confirmed as the new full-time presenter. Sophie Raworth was later named as the main presenter of the BBC News at One. Raworth is now a regular presenter on the News at Six and BBC News at Ten, covering for main presenters during their absences.

Since April 2005, the programme has formed the first half-hour of the Six O'Clock Newshour on the BBC News Channel. The second half-hour consists of business and sport updates presented from within the News Channel studio by one of the News Channel presenters. As before, the bulletin still completes at 6:30 pm before splitting off to regional news programmes on BBC One.

On 5 October 2007 it was announced that Natasha Kaplinsky was leaving the BBC to replace Kirsty Young on 5 News, taking up her new role on 18 February 2008 presenting two half-hour evening bulletins. She left at the end of the Six O'Clock News on the same day.

For a while Sian Williams filled in as co-presenter, but on 3 December 2007 the programme went single-headed, with George Alagiah as main presenter, and Sian Williams as deputy presenter. A few months into the new arrangement Fiona Bruce took over from Williams as the main Friday presenter.

On 28 January 2008, the programme moved studios, from N6 to TC7, as part of a restructuring across BBC News. On 21 April 2008 the programmes, along with the rest of BBC News, underwent a refresh, taking on new titles and a new set.

On 17 March 2013, the BBC News at Six bulletin presented by Sophie Raworth was the final programme to be broadcast from TC7 in BBC Television Centre, after BBC Breakfast and Newsnight vacated the studio in 2012. The studio was demolished later in 2013 as part of the redevelopment of the site. On 18 March 2013, the programme moved to Broadcasting House, along with the BBC News channel and the other BBC One bulletins, and began broadcasting in high-definition.

George Alagiah was diagnosed with bowel cancer in 2014, and took leave from presenting duties. Raworth and Bruce were the main cover presenters during this time, which also saw regular appearances from Reeta Chakrabarti and Jane Hill. Alagiah returned in late 2015, but saw his cancer return in 2018, and once again took leave to undergo further treatment. Raworth once again covered Alagiah during his absence, with Bruce, Chakrabarti, Hill and Clive Myrie also regularly appearing on the programme. Alagiah returned to his presenting duties in January 2019. He last presented the BBC News at Six in 2022. In July 2023, he died from bowel cancer at the age of 67.

After eleven years in the role, in January 2019, Fiona Bruce stepped down as the programme's regular presenter on Fridays in order to replace David Dimbleby on Question Time. Sophie Raworth then began to present on Fridays.

After the unification of BBC News for UK viewers and international viewers, the programme continues to be simulcast only on the UK feed. The presentation after the merge remains identical except for the new titles with chameleon-style branding.

From February 2026, the BBC expanded its British Sign Language coverage by announcing that this programme would join the BBC News at One and the 8 am hour, in providing BSL-interpreted broadcasts at 6 pm, Monday to Friday, weeknights on the BBC News Channel.

== Presenters ==
=== Current presenters ===
Years	Presenter	Current Role
2003-present	Sophie Raworth	Main presenter: Monday-Thursday
2014–present	Reeta Chakrabarti	Regular presenter
2015–present	Clive Myrie	Regular presenter
1999-present	Fiona Bruce	Regular presenter
2005–2007, 2014–present	Jane Hill	Regular presenter
2006–2007, 2017–present	Ben Brown	Relief presenter
2018–present	Tina Daheley	Relief presenter
2025–present	Riz Lateef	Relief presenter
2025–present	Christian Fraser	Relief presenter

=== Former presenters ===
If there is no position before the years of being a presenter, then this newsreader was either a relief presenter or occasional stand-in presenter.

- Sue Lawley (Main co-presenter, 1984–1988)
- Jeremy Paxman (Relief Co-presenter,1984–1985)
- Nicholas Witchell (Main co-presenter, 1984–1998)
- Philip Hayton (1985–1992)
- Frances Coverdale (1986)
- Debbie Thrower (1987–1988)
- Andrew Harvey (Main co-presenter, 1985–1999)
- Laurie Mayer (1988–1993)
- Mike Smartt (1988–1994)
- Jill Dando (1989–1999), Main co-presenter 1994–1999
- John Humphrys (Relief Co-presenter 1989–1999)
- Anna Ford (Main co-presenter, 1989–1999)
- Chris Lowe (1989–1993)
- Peter Sissons (Main co-presenter, 1989–1994)
- Moira Stuart (Main co-presenter, 1989–1999)
- Jennie Bond (Main co-presenter,1993–1999)
- Edward Stourton (journalist) (1993–1999)
- Martyn Lewis (Main co-presenter, 1994–1999)
- Huw Edwards (1994–2023, Main presenter 1999–2003)
- Justin Webb (1995–1999)
- Michael Buerk (1996)
- Jon Sopel (1997–2007)
- Diana Madill (1997)
- Clarence Mitchell (1997–1999)
- Sian Williams (2000–2013)
- Darren Jordon (2001–2005)
- Bill Turnbull (2003–2005)
- Dermot Murnaghan (2003–2007)
- George Alagiah (Main presenter, 2003–2022)
- Natasha Kaplinsky (Main co-presenter, 2005–2007)
- Nicholas Owen (2007–2010)
- Matt Frei (2008–2009)
- Emily Maitlis (2009–2015)
- Mishal Husain (2010–2024)
- Simon McCoy (2019)

== Current presentation ==
Presenter Reeta Chakrabarti at the opening of a bulletin in Studio B of Broadcasting House on 15 June 2022

Unlike the other BBC News bulletins that were broadcast from BBC Television Centre, the BBC News at Six was broadcast from TC7, which until 2012 housed Newsnight, Newsround, The Politics Show and The Andrew Marr Show, most of which moved to Broadcasting House. The programme would occasionally be broadcast from the BBC News channel studio (N6). Since the move to Broadcasting House the bulletin is broadcast from Studio E, the same studio as the BBC News channel and other national bulletins. The current set design and titles were introduced in March 2013.

Within the last few minutes of each bulletin, a full national weather forecast is presented by Helen Willetts, Alina Jenkins, Susan Powell or Louise Lear of the BBC Weather centre. The final full national weather forecast on the BBC News at Six, broadcast from Studio TC7, was presented by Nick Miller.

In October 2018, due to technical difficulties at the Broadcasting House, Fiona Bruce was forced to present from the Millbank Studios.

On 26 May 2022, the BBC announced that the BBC News at Six and Ten, along with BBC Breakfast would be revamped in June 2022 to include a completely new studio and presentation, as part of a wider rebrand of the BBC in general. Local regional programmes would also be revamped over the then-coming months to tie in with the regional BBC channels broadcasting in HD by the beginning of 2023.

== Production ==
The current editor since July 2013 is Paul Royall.

== Criticism ==
The bulletin has been accused of being an example of the BBC 'dumbing-down' with more consumer-led reports and dynamic presentation. In particular, in 2006 the then Leader of the House of Commons Jack Straw berated the programme's presenters for "prancing around the studio".

The BBC defend the format as they believe that the body language and integration of presenter and graphics increase the viewer's understanding of the news.

The bulletin has also been accused of having an English perspective on the news in terms of items covered and priority each news item is given. There have been calls in Scotland for a separate Scottish Six that would combine Scottish, British and international news items to create a news programme from a Scottish perspective. The idea was rejected by the BBC in 2003 after a series of public meetings and a poll showed that 38% favoured the idea, as opposed to the 45% that wanted no change. However, the SNP have continued to call for the change.

== See also ==
- ITV Evening News
