= Montague Modlyn =

British journalist and radio host (1921–1994)

Monty Modlyn OBE
- Born: 23 May 1921; Lambeth, London, England
- Died: 6 May 1994 (aged 72)
- Occupations: Radio and TV presenter

Montague Modlyn, OBE (23 May 1921 – 6 May 1994), known as Monty Modlyn, was a British journalist, best known as a radio and TV presenter. Modlyn worked on radio and TV, often as a roving reporter.

== Early life ==
Modlyn was born in Lambeth, the son of a Jewish tailor, and left school at 14. His family owned two clothes shops and a market stall in Lower Marsh, Waterloo. Modlyn worked as a proofreader's assistant for the Daily Mail and then wrote for the South London Press and the Evening Standard. He worked as a hairdresser before joining the family business.

== Career ==
During the Second World War he served in the RAF. In 1942, while on leave, he first broadcast Down Lambeth Way, a talk programme for Forces radio. After the war, Modlyn submitted a string of programme ideas to the BBC, without success.

In 1949 he was elected as a Labour councillor in the Metropolitan Borough of Lambeth for the Prince's Ward, and again in 1953 for the Bishop's Ward, and finally for the Marsh Ward in 1956.

In 1964, Modlyn was an outside broadcaster for the Jack de Manio early morning radio programme Today. In the late 1960s he took part in pilot shows for Tyne Tees TV, including a Christmas Special. He presented The World of Monty Modlyn for Tyne Tees and in 1969 he moved to Thames Television as a reporter on Eamonn Andrews' evening magazine programme Today.

Modlyn cultivated an East End working-class image, together with an apparent lack of respect for the rich and famous. One interview in this vein was with Ugandan dictator Idi Amin Dada, who was asked directly how many he had murdered. Amin responded: "You very cheeky man!" Modlyn was delighted by that, and adopted a theme song:

Pardon my cheek, and the way that I speak, but no matter where I go
To common or gentry, I talk element'ry
In the only way I know.

Modlyn published his autobiography, Pardon My Cheek, in 1971.

In 1973 he joined the original team at Capital Radio and four years later in 1977, he moved to LBC radio. On LBC he presented Monty Modlyn at Large and a series called Monty's Pub where he visited a different public house every week. As well as pubs, Modlyn had a fondness for smoked salmon and cream cheese bagels, which he would consume each week during his Sunday evening phone-in show on LBC. In September 1979, Jeremy Beadle replaced him in this role after Beadle wrote to the radio station telling them to sack Modlyn.

Former BBC Producer Roger Ordish has claimed, as part of an audiobook "extra" to the documentary maker Louis Theroux's autobiography, that Modlyn was his first choice to present what was later titled Jim'll Fix It but he was overruled.

In 1982 Radio 4 broadcast Modlyn Through, a portrait of the broadcaster.

== Personal life and death ==
Modlyn married Dorothy Harris in 1959 in Hackney, London. The couple had no children. His personalised car number plate was MM 405, which were his initials and the number of lines on early TV sets. In the 1983 Queen's Birthday Honours, he was appointed an Officer of the Order of the British Empire (OBE) "for charitable service", most notably for the RSPCA.

Modlyn died in Charing Cross Hospital, Hammersmith of a cerebral haemorrhage on 6 May 1994, aged 72. His widow died in January 2017.
