= Alan Towers =

British television presenter (1934–2008)

- Born: 1934; Liverpool, England, United Kingdom
- Died: 24 May 2008; Warwickshire, England
- Occupation: Newsreader

Alan Towers (1934 – 24 May 2008) was a presenter of Midlands Today, BBC Midlands' regional news programme.

== Career ==
After stints as a newsreader with ITN and Granada Television in Manchester, Towers joined BBC Midlands in 1972 as the main presenter on Midlands Today and was also seen nationally as a presenter of features from the English Midlands on Nationwide. His most famous item was the infamous "skateboarding duck" story. He regularly presented the programme with Kay Alexander.

Following a heart attack during the late 1980s, Towers left his role as main presenter but continued on Midlands Today as a sports presenter and reporter. During this time, he also raised thousands of pounds for charity by walking the Great Wall of China and riding a motorbike across Canada. He appeared in a few episodes of the BBC's medical drama Dangerfield as a local TV news reporter.

In 1997, Towers announced his resignation from the BBC on-air and left viewers with a disparaging comment about the state of BBC management:

For me, this is a personal goodbye because I'm leaving the BBC after 25 years. When I joined the corporation, it was led by giants. Now, I'm afraid it is being led by pygmies in grey suits wearing blindfolds. How sad. But times do change. From me, for the final time, goodbye.

Despite these comments, Towers returned to Midlands Today as a special guest on the programme's last broadcast from the Pebble Mill studios in October 2004.

== Personal life ==
Towers died at the age of 73 on 24 May 2008 at his home in Warwickshire, after a long illness.
