= Nicholas Witchell =

BBC journalist (born 1953)

Nicholas Witchell OStJ FRGS
- Born: Nicholas Newton Henshall Witchell; 23 September 1953 (age 73); Cosford, Shropshire, England
- Education: University of Leeds
- Occupation: Journalist
- Years active: 1976–2024
- Spouse: Maria Staples (m. 2014)
- Children: 2

Nicholas Newton Henshall Witchell OStJ FRGS (born 23 September 1953) is a retired English journalist and news presenter. The latter half of his career was as royal correspondent for BBC News.

== Early life and career ==
Witchell was born on 23 September 1953 in Shropshire. He was educated at Epsom College, a British fee-paying school in Surrey, and at Leeds University, where he read Law and edited the Leeds Student newspaper. In 1974, Terence Dalton Limited published his book The Loch Ness Story, a history of alleged sightings of the Loch Ness Monster.

Witchell worked for the BBC from 1976 until his retirement in 2024. In 1979, he joined the corporation's Northern Ireland office, moving to London to cover the Falklands War in 1982, and then returning to Belfast as the BBC's Ireland correspondent. He and Sue Lawley were the first readers of the BBC Six O'Clock News when the programme was launched on 3 September 1984 (replacing the early-evening news magazine Sixty Minutes). In 1988, the Six O'Clock News studio was invaded during a live broadcast by a group of women protesting against the Section 28 law (which sought to prevent councils from promoting homosexuality). Witchell grappled with the protesters and was said to have sat on one woman, provoking the frontpage headline in the Daily Mirror: "Beeb Man Sits on Lesbian". During the 1989 journalists' strike, Witchell was one of the few newsreaders not to strike. This was parodied by Spitting Image with a puppet likeness shown not only breaking the journalists' strike by working, but also showing up through the news broadcast doing various other jobs within the BBC and jobs covered in the news report.

In 1989, he moved from the evening to the breakfast news slot, where he remained for five years. During the 1991 Gulf War, he was a volunteer presenter on the BBC Radio 4 News FM service.

Witchell was the first reporter to relay the news of the death in 1979 of Lord Mountbatten, the death in 1986 of former Prime Minister Harold Macmillan, the 1987 Zeebrugge ferry disaster, the 1988 Lockerbie disaster, and the death in 1997 of Diana, Princess of Wales.

In July 2015, George Batts, a veteran of the Normandy landings, met with Witchell. Batts pointed out that the United Kingdom was the only major Allied nation without a dedicated memorial in Normandy. Witchell set up the Normandy Memorial Trust after their meeting, which led to the construction of the British Normandy Memorial.

== Royal correspondent ==
In 1998, Witchell became a royal and diplomatic correspondent. In 2002, his obituary of Princess Margaret, Countess of Snowdon, recorded before her death but screened following the announcement, was reportedly not well received at Buckingham Palace, as it mentioned her lovers and "copious" consumption of whisky.

Witchell provoked royal displeasure again in 2005. At a press conference at the Swiss ski resort Klosters, Witchell asked Charles III, then Prince of Wales, how he and his sons were feeling about his forthcoming marriage to Camilla Parker Bowles. After a response from his son Prince William, the Prince of Wales said under his breath, and referring to Witchell, "These bloody people. I can't bear that man. I mean, he's so awful, he really is." A spokesman for the BBC defended their reporter, stating: "He is one of our finest. His question was perfectly reasonable under the circumstances."

In October 2023, Witchell announced that he would retire in early 2024. He retired from the BBC on 31 March 2024.

== Life outside journalism ==
Witchell is a governor of Queen Elizabeth's Foundation for Disabled People, an Officer of the Order of St John and a Fellow of the Royal Geographical Society. He has two daughters and currently lives in Central London with his wife Maria, née Staples.

Witchell appeared as himself in the Doctor Who Christmas Special "Voyage of the Damned", broadcast on Christmas Day 2007.
