= Andrew Harvey (journalist) =

British journalist (born 1944)

Andrew Harvey (born 3 March 1944) is a British journalist, who over a period of thirty years has presented most of main television news programmes of the BBC and ITN.

== Career ==
Harvey began his BBC television career in Bristol working in production, before trying his hand as a news reporter in 1975, then moving on to the launch of breakfast television in Britain: Breakfast Time on BBC One. From there he went on to present the One O'Clock News, Six O'Clock News and flagship Nine O'Clock News on BBC One. From national news, he moved to become a presenter on South Today, the BBC's regional news service for the Southampton region, as well as having presented on BBC Points West in the Bristol region, and also presented nationally once more, on BBC News.

He left the BBC eventually to become a presenter on the ITV News Channel produced by ITN, where he first presented the breakfast programme with Lucy Alexander before moving to his own programme after breakfast in the daily schedule Live with Andrew Harvey.

Since the channel's closure in December 2005, he has not appeared on any other news programmes. He now conducts media training through his company, HarveyLeach.
