= Martin Young (journalist) =

British newsreader (1947–2024)

Martin Young (5 July 1947 – 10 May 2024) was a British television reporter and interviewer.

== Life and career ==
Born in Glasgow, he attended Dulwich College and Gonville and Caius College, Cambridge, where he was President of the Marlowe Society and a member of Footlights.

Young began his career as a researcher for Border Television in 1969, and became a reporter/presenter for Tyne Tees Television in 1970 before joining BBC Look North. In 1973, he joined Nationwide, going on to work on both Newsnight and Panorama. In 1980 he helped to found the award-winning programme Rough Justice which led to the release of five people on murder and serious assault charges. This work formed the basis of two books: Rough Justice and More Rough Justice, co-authored with Peter Hill. In 1986 he and the producer, Peter Hill, were suspended from the BBC for three months and barred from working on investigative programmes for two years after being found to have made 'unjustifiable threats' to make an interviewee withdraw allegations which had led to a conviction.

Young co-presented the Midday News programme on LBC Newstalk 97.3 FM on London's news station, alongside Brian Widlake. He also worked on BBC Radio 4 hosting the panel game Who Goes There?, guested on the first three series of Have I Got News for You, and was later a media trainer.

Young died from liver cancer on 10 May 2024, at the age of 76.
