= Brass Tacks =

Brass Tacks or brass tacks may refer to:

== Film and television ==
- Brass Tacks (UK TV programme), a 1977–1988 British documentary programme that aired on BBC
- Brass Tacks (Pakistani TV program), a Pakistani defense and political program

== Music ==
- Brass Tacks (album), an album by the rock band NRBQ
- Brass Tacks Records, a subsidiary of DRT Entertainment

== Other uses ==
- Brass tack, a type of drawing pin
- Operation Brasstacks, a 1986–1987 military exercise by the Indian Army
