= Triona Holden =

British author, artist and journalist (1959–2026)

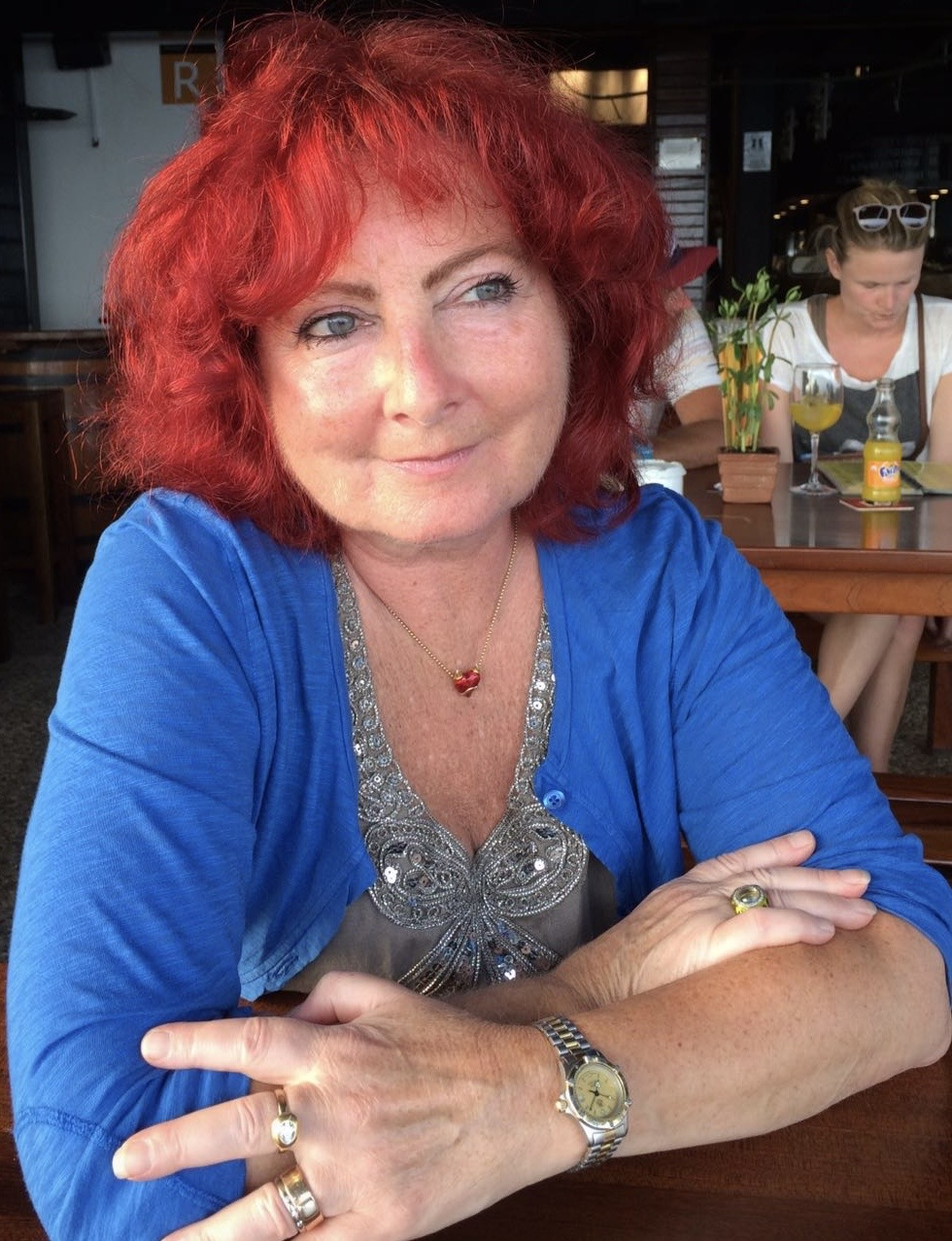
- Triona in 2016
- Born: Triona Denise Holden; 20 May 1959; Glasgow, Scotland
- Died: 29 August 2026 (aged 67)
- Occupations: Journalist, broadcaster, author and artist
- Spouse: Ian Palmer

Triona Denise Palmer (née Holden; 20 May 1959 – 29 August 2026) was a British author, artist, journalist, and BBC presenter and correspondent.

== Life and career ==
Triona Denise Holden was born in Glasgow on 20 May 1959. She began her career in 1976, aged 17, as a journalist at the Sheffield Star newspaper, eventually becoming their assistant crime reporter. Her first major story was Peter Sutcliffe, the Yorkshire Ripper.

She briefly worked as a broadcast journalist for Mercia Sound in Coventry, then a freelancer for LBC in London, before joining the BBC in 1982. She started on BBC Radio, before moving to television. Working as a news presenter and reporter, she covered the miners' strike of 1984-85. She was later to write Queen Coal: Women of the Miners, published in 2005, derived from her experiences covering the strike. She was the youngest female national news reporter and the youngest person to present the Today and PM programme on BBC Radio 4; presented the Six O'Clock News on BBC 1; Newsbeat on Radio 1 and World TV News. In 1987 she was the only reporter to broadcast live from the disaster scene after getting onto the wreck of the Herald of Free Enterprise when it became semi-submerged off Zeebrugge.

While at the BBC, in her role as a reporter, she travelled extensively to war zones, famines, conflicts, and other disasters, including the aftermath of the Tiananmen Square protests, the Brixton Riots, and the 1986 coup in Lesotho.

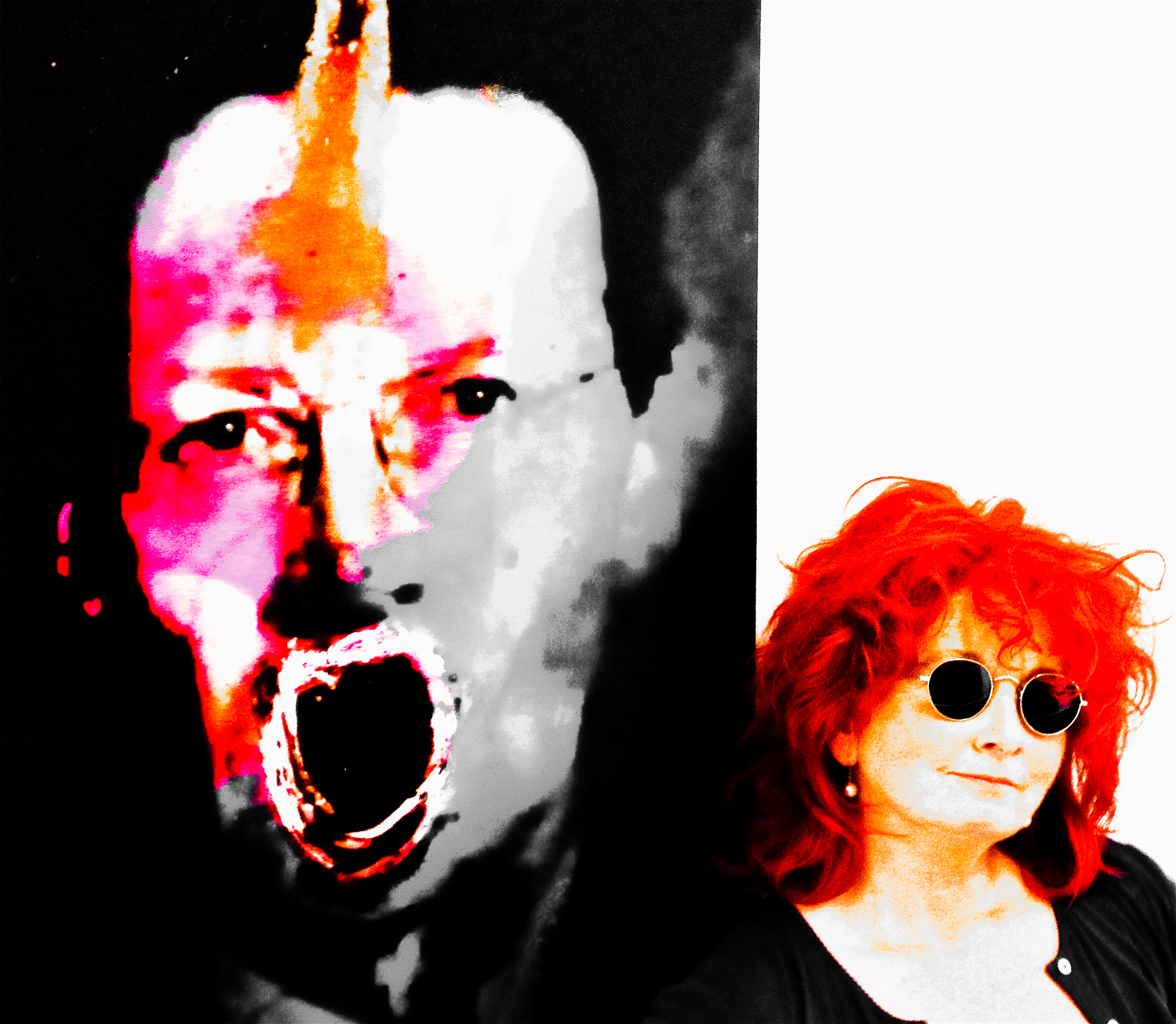
Triona at Chelsea

Holden retired from the BBC on medical grounds aged 39 after becoming seriously ill with Systemic Lupus Erythematosus. She later retrained as an artist. From a Foundation Course in Fine Art & Design at The Camden Working Men's College 2006, she went on to Chelsea College of Fine Art and Design graduating in 2010 with BA (Hons) in Fine Art. She subsequently lived and worked in Whitstable.

In 2014, Holden published an online autobiographical project, About Triona: My life in pictures and film, containing photographs and film from her life and career.

Her biography of British strongwoman Joan Rhodes, “An Iron Girl in a Velvet Glove: The Life of Joan Rhodes”, was published by The History Press on 18 November 2021. Triona had known Rhodes personally and later appeared on the BBC television programme “The Repair Shop” to tell her story.

She was also a member of A is for Aphra (Behn) Society.

Holden died from an autoimmune disorder on 29 August 2026, aged 67.

== Bibliography ==
- Holden, Triona. Positive Options for Antiphospholipid Syndrome (APS): Self-Help and Treatment (2003) ISBN 978-0897934091
- Holden, Triona & Hughes, Graham. Talking About Lupus: What to do and how to cope (2004) ISBN 978-0749924683
- Holden, Triona. Queen Coal: Women of the Miners' Strike (2005) ISBN 978-0750939713
- Holden, Triona. An Iron Girl in a Velvet Glove: The Life of Joan Rhodes (2021) ISBN 978-0-7509-9679-2
