= Jack de Manio =

British journalist and radio presenter

Giovanni Batista "Jack" de Manio MC* (26 January 1914 – 28 October 1988) was a British journalist, best known as a radio presenter.

== Life and work ==
He was the son of Jean and Florence de Manio. His father was an Italian aviator who died in a flying accident before he was born, while his mother was Polish. He attended Aldenham School in Hertfordshire. As a young man, he worked first as an invoice clerk and then as a waiter. He was called up by the British Army and commissioned as a second lieutenant in the Royal Sussex Regiment in 1939. He served with the British Expeditionary Force (BEF) in 1939–40 and, from 1940 to 1944, with the 1st Battalion in the Middle East. He was awarded the Military Cross in 1940, with a bar subsequently added for his service in North Africa. On 20 March 1944, he was "dismissed the Service by sentence of a Field Gen. Court-Martial".

De Manio's first experience of radio came in 1944, when he joined the Forces Broadcasting Unit in Beirut. On leaving the army in 1946, he became an announcer on the BBC Overseas Service. He transferred to the Home Service in 1950.

De Manio's career nearly came to an end in 1956, when he was a duty announcer for the BBC's Home Service. A major radio feature, The Land of the Niger, was broadcast worldwide to mark a royal visit to Nigeria. Carelessly, he introduced it as "The Land of the Nigger". The incident provoked widespread outrage. He was immediately suspended, but subsequently returned to the General Overseas Service.

In 1958, de Manio was chosen to present the morning current affairs programme Today, which had begun a few months earlier. The programme was less focused on hard news than it would later become, and suited de Manio's relaxed, humorous style. He became well known for the frequency with which he gave the time incorrectly. In 1969, he became the first radio broadcaster to be permitted to interview Prince Charles. He was voted British Radio Personality of the Year in 1964 and 1971. In 1970, the programme's format was changed to introduce two presenters each day. Uncomfortable with the new format, de Manio left the following year.

By the time of his departure, de Manio was considered out of step with the BBC's changing news values. The World at One had successfully introduced the BBC to the best of Fleet Street's journalistic traditions, embodied by its hardened newspaper editor, William Hardcastle. Hardcastle contrasted unfavourably with de Manio, whom David Hendy described in Life on Air: A History of Radio 4 as "a Bentley-driving habitué of Chelsea and the clubs of St James, complete with a rich gin and tonic voice". Sue MacGregor disliked what she described as de Manio's "golf-club bore attitude to anything foreign".

From 1971 to 1978, de Manio presented an afternoon programme, Jack de Manio Precisely, on Radio 4. He subsequently became an occasional contributor to Woman's Hour.

== Personal life ==
In 1935 de Manio married Juliet Gravaeret Kaufman of New York: they had a son. The marriage was dissolved in 1946. He was married for a second time in 1947 in Chelsea, London, to Loveday Elizabeth Matthews, a widow (née Abbott), (2 February 1917 – April 1999).

== Selected bibliography ==
- To Auntie with Love. London: Hutchinson, 1967. ISBN 978-0090851201. Autobiography.
- Life Begins Too Early: A Sort of Autobiography. London: Hutchinson, 1970. ISBN 978-0091043100.

== Footnotes ==
Media offices
| Preceded by Alan Skempton | Presenter of Today Programme; 1958–1971 | Succeeded by Robert Robinson |
