= Sally Hardcastle =

British journalist and radio presenter

Sally Turton Hardcastle (22 April 1945 – 10 November 2014) was a journalist and radio presenter, best known for presenting Woman's Hour and The World Tonight for the BBC.

She was born in London. Her father was William Hardcastle, a British news broadcaster. She spent her early years in Washington, D.C., where her father was a correspondent for Reuters. In the early 1950s the family returned to Britain, where her father became editor of the Daily Mail. She and her sister attended St Philomena's Catholic High School for Girls in Carshalton in the London Borough of Sutton. After her parents' marriage broke down, she and her siblings moved with their mother to Cornwall. She attended Cornwall Technical College, where she gained her A-levels.

In 1962, aged 17, she moved to Headley, Surrey to live with her father, and studied journalism, eventually joining the Sunday Express as a reporter. Years later, she worked briefly with the New York Tribune.

== Death ==
She died in 2014, aged 69, from undisclosed causes. She was unmarried.
