= Chris Lowe (journalist) =

Scottish news presenter

- Born: John Christopher Lowe; 25 January 1949 (age 77); Ayrshire, Scotland
- Occupations: Journalist, Presenter, Newsreader
- Notable credit(s): BBC News at Ten; BBC News at One; BBC News at Six; PM; BBC News
- Children: 2

John Christopher Lowe (born 25 January 1949 in Ayrshire, Scotland) is a Scottish-born former news presenter who worked for BBC News for 37 years until his retirement on 4 January 2009.

== Education ==
Lowe was educated at Dragon School in Oxford, Haileybury College, and at Brasenose College, Oxford.

== Career ==
After graduation in 1972, Lowe intended to train as a teacher. He joined the BBC in 1972 on the same day as Jeremy Paxman under the graduate journalist programme. He worked as a political correspondent at Westminster and then spent time as a journalist in Northern Ireland during the worst of what became known as The Troubles. Later his work for the BBC took him as far afield as Ethiopia and Argentina.

From the mid-1990s he was a newsreader on BBC One bulletins, also becoming a frequent presenter on radio programmes such as PM. His final work for the BBC until his retirement in 2009 saw him presenting on the BBC News Channel on Fridays between 7pm and 10pm, and Saturdays and Sundays between 7pm and 12 midnight. His co-presenters included Annita McVeigh and Joanna Gosling. Lowe was replaced in April 2009 by Clive Myrie.

== Personal life ==
Chris Lowe lives in Ealing, west London. His son Alex is the award-winning rugby correspondent for The Times newspaper and his daughter Rebecca works as a sports presenter for Fox Sports and previously NBC Sports in the U.S. before that and Setanta Sports in Ireland, starting her broadcast career at the BBC.

A lifelong Crystal Palace supporter, Lowe was an elected member of the Executive Board of Middlesex County Cricket Club (2010–2019), and is a former chairman of its Dining Club. He also chairs regular forums for The Cricket Society for whom he was appointed as a vice president in 2006, a position which he currently he shares with Charlotte Edwards, Vic Marks and Sir Tim Rice.
