= Richard Kershaw =

British television reporter

Richard Ruegg Kershaw (16 April 1934 – 28 April 2014) was a British television reporter and interviewer.

Born in London, he was educated at Cheltenham College (an independent school for boys) in England. He was then called up for National Service as a second lieutenant in the Royal Artillery, serving in Germany before studying at Clare College, Cambridge for a history degree and later at the University of Virginia Graduate School in the USA.

He was best known for his contributions as a reporter to the BBC's Panorama current affairs series. Later he joined Nationwide. He was also a reporter on other BBC current affairs programmes including 24 hours, Newsday, Newsweek and general election night broadcasts. He died aged 80 on 28 April 2014.
