= Everyman (TV series) =

Everyman is a British television documentary series that aired on BBC One in a late-night slot on Sunday evenings between 1977 and 2000. Its subject matter tended to be focused on moral and religious issues, often in the form of a film in which individuals would discuss their thoughts. One edition from 1990, A Game of Soldiers, concerned a group of soldiers exploring their feelings about being trained to kill. Throughout much of its time on air, series of Everyman aired alternately with Heart of the Matter, a debate series which featured somewhat similar topics. Both series were cancelled in the 2000s after the BBC revamped the output of its religious programming.
