= Skateboarding duck =

TV performing duck

Herbie the skateboarding duck (c. 1976-83) was the subject of an item first broadcast on the Midlands Today insert to the BBC news magazine programme Nationwide on 24 May 1978.

Herbie, an Aylesbury duck, was bought by Jacky and Paddy Randall of Croydon for their children Mikala and Colin. The film, presented by reporter Alan Towers, includes footage of Herbie waddling along the street, joining the family at breakfast and attacking the Randalls' terrier. Part of the film is a four-second shot of Herbie apparently skateboarding by himself on Colin's board. This image seemingly captured the public imagination, and the BBC received many requests for it to be shown again, which it frequently was.

The clip had been since repeated many times since on other television programmes.

As a result of the item's popularity, the term "skateboarding duck" has come to signify a particular sort of quirky and essentially frivolous news story, often used to fill time at the end of a broadcast.

The item came to define Nationwide in the public mind, and the programme's final item was a sung eulogy to the skateboarding duck, with a surprising twist.

== See also ==
- List of individual birds
