= Judi Lines =

British broadcaster (born 1951)

Judi Lines (born 1951) is a former British television and radio broadcaster.

Born in Lincoln, Lines spent three years (1973–76) as a continuity announcer for Anglia Television before joining BBC East as a newsreader and presenter for the nightly regional news magazine Look East, and working on BBC Radio 4's regional service for the Eastern Counties.

By 1984, Lines had joined Tyne Tees Television as an announcer, replacing Kathy Secker. As part of her continuity duties, she also read regional news bulletins and presented two regular features; Lookaround (a what's-on guide) and The Birthday Spot. She left Tyne Tees in 1991 prior to the company's takeover by Yorkshire Television.

Lines later joined the now-defunct Great North Radio as a presenter and carried out freelance work before quitting broadcasting. She went on to become Promotions and Marketing Manager for Fenwick's in Newcastle upon Tyne, using her married name Judi James.

Her younger sister is former Anglia Television announcer Verity Lines.
