= William Hardcastle (broadcaster) =

British journalist and editor

William Hardcastle (26 March 1918 – 10 November 1975) was a British journalist, editor of the Daily Mail and first presenter of the lunchtime news programme The World at One on BBC Radio.

Hardcastle was born in Newcastle upon Tyne, and educated at the Newcastle Preparatory School and Durham School. His early intention to follow his father into the medical profession was thwarted when he contracted osteomyelitis as a fifteen-year-old, and in 1938 he joined the Shields Gazette as a reporter.

Unfit for active service, Hardcastle remained a journalist throughout the Second World War, moving in turn to the Sheffield Telegraph, the London bureau of Kemsley Newspapers and Reuters. In 1944 he became Reuters' correspondent at Supreme Allied Headquarters, followed by postings to New York and Washington.

In 1959 Hardcastle was appointed editor of the Sunday Dispatch, and after two months in that job was moved to become editor of the Daily Mail until 1963, covering the period when it absorbed the News Chronicle. He then moved into broadcasting. On 4 October 1965, he became the launch presenter of The World at One on the BBC Home Service and then BBC Radio 4.

He retained this role until his death, aged 57, in 1975, and from 1970 hosted the PM programme, as well. His daughter, Sally Hardcastle (1945–2014), was also a broadcast journalist.

Media offices
Preceded by Arthur Wareham	Editor of the Daily Mail; 1959–1963	Succeeded by Mike Randall
