= Heart of the Matter (TV series) =

British television series

Heart of the Matter is a British television debate series that aired on BBC One from 1979 to 2000. Presented variously by Joan Bakewell, Helena Kennedy QC and David Jessel, its subject matter was often concerned with religious or ethical issues. Topics covered include subjects as diverse as substance abuse, the effects of anti-personnel landmines, and homosexuality. Bakewell would usually chair an in-studio debate in which invited guests would discuss the edition's chosen topic. An edition from 1996 hosted by Joan Bakewell, The Heart of the Matter: God Under the Microscope, featured a debate on science and religion and included as guests David Starkey, Mary Warnock, Wentzel van Huyssteen, Richard Dawkins, Polish Roman Catholic priest and 2008 Templeton Prize winner cosmologist Prof. Michael Heller, and James Watson.

Heart of the Matter was broadcast late on Sunday evenings, usually alternating with the similarly themed Everyman, though the latter tended to have more of a religious focus. Both programmes were cancelled in the 2000s following a revamp of BBC output.
