= Sixty Minutes (British TV programme) =

British news and current affairs programme

- Created by: BBC News
- Presented by: Nick Ross, Desmond Wilcox, Sarah Kennedy, Sally Magnusson, Jan Leeming, Moira Stuart, Richard Whitmore
- Country of origin: United Kingdom
- Original language: English

Production
- Production location: London
- Running time: 60 minutes

Original release
- Network: BBC1
- Release: 24 October 1983 – 27 July 1984

Related
- Nationwide; Six O'Clock News

Sixty Minutes is a defunct news and current affairs programme which ran each weekday at 5:40 pm from 24 October 1983 to 27 July 1984 on BBC1. It replaced Nationwide, and integrated the BBC's main regional news magazines into a single programme, as per its predecessor.

It was originally planned to start on 5 September 1983 the first night of the BBC1 Autumn Season but was delayed until 24 October 1983.

However, the BBC's News department stoutly maintained its independence from their colleagues in Current Affairs, and the first 15 minutes of news was almost a separate entity, followed by around 20 minutes of regional news before the final 25 minutes of national current affairs. Accordingly, the format was unwieldy, with neither the bulletin concision nor soft approach of Nationwide, its predecessor.

The editor, David Lloyd, poached Nick Ross from the highly popular Breakfast Time to front the show, along with Desmond Wilcox, Sarah Kennedy, and Sally Magnusson. Kennedy was unable to join the team at the programme's launch, but eventually began to present Sixty Minutes after Wilcox was dismissed, just seven weeks into the show's run.

The news bulletins were usually broadcast from a separate studio at BBC Television Centre and presented by either Jan Leeming, Moira Stuart or Richard Whitmore. The opening titles were designed by Terry Hylton and produced by the Computer Film Company.

As with its predecessor Nationwide, Sixty Minutes was also responsible for the evening regional news output for London and the South East. Whereas all the other BBC regions had their own dedicated news bulletins, Sixty Minutes presenters would read the latest news for London and the South East, simply titled "South East".

The programme was not well received, and although its ratings eventually began to improve, the final edition aired on Friday 27 July 1984. Throughout August, BBC1 reverted to placing the BBC Evening News at 5.40 pm followed by the regional news magazines, before launching a new schedule on 3 September 1984 with the Six O'clock News; that programme remains in place as of 2026. Arguably, another legacy of Sixty Minutes was the eventual integration of the BBC News and Current Affairs departments.

== See also ==
- 40 Minutes
