= Richard Whitmore =

British broadcast journalist and actor

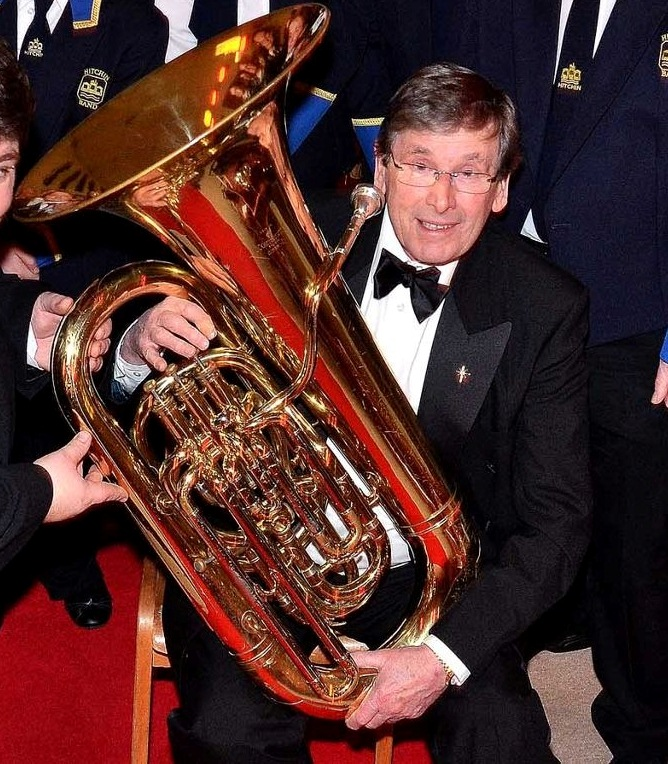
- Whitmore in 2011
- Born: 22 December 1933 (age 92); Hitchin, Hertfordshire, England
- Occupations: Newsreader (retired); Author
- Spouse: Wendy Vaughan (m. 1957)
- Children: 4

Richard Whitmore (born 22 December 1933) is an English broadcaster, writer and actor. Whitmore is best known for his work as a BBC newsreader in the 1970s and 1980s and occasional work as a reporter.

He was educated at the former Hitchin Grammar School, and did not go to university. When the BBC launched a daytime television news bulletin in 1981, News After Noon, Whitmore was its main presenter, appearing alongside another newsreader, variously including Moira Stewart, Frances Coverdale and Fern Britton.

Whitmore appeared (along with other presenters and newsreaders) in the "Nothing Like a Dame" musical number on the Morecambe and Wise Christmas Show in 1977. Later, he performed professionally on the stage in several productions. In 1991 he appeared as a newscaster in the comedy film King Ralph. He also appeared as a TV Newsreader in several episodes of TV series in the 1990s, including the BBC sitcom Only Fools and Horses. In December 2011 he became President of Hitchin Band. He is also the author of several books, including a 2007 biography of Reginald Hine, a historian from Hitchin who committed suicide in 1949.

Whitmore lives in Hitchin with his wife Wendy, whom he married on 26 April 1957. The couple have four daughters and nine grandchildren. The studio at the Queen Mother Theatre in Hitchin is named in his honour.
