= Laurie Mayer (news presenter) =

British journalist

Laurie Mayer is a British journalist, best known for his work on BBC radio and television news programmes.

Mayer's radio career started on BBC Radio London in 1971, mainly presenting the station's breakfast show "Rush Hour". Between 1973 and 1979, he was one of the presenters on the BBC Radio 1 news programme Newsbeat.

Mayer was a presenter of the BBC's News After Noon, BBC News at Six and BBC Breakfast programme, before leaving for Sky News in the early 1990s. He narrated the ITV emergency services documentary Blues and Twos from 1993 to 1998.

He went on to become the press spokesman for the owner of Harrods, Mohammed Al Fayed. He returned to the BBC on a one-year contract as the main presenter of South East Today, but left abruptly citing a culture of bullying in the South East News department. The BBC won an ensuing employment tribunal. Mayer appealed and lost.

== Personal life ==
Mayer got engaged to his wife Jill Hanson in 1971.
