= Nationwide (TV programme) =

British news and current affairs programme

- Nationwide's "mandala" logo, introduced in 1972.
- Genre: News; Current affairs
- Created by: Derrick Amoore
- Presented by: Michael Barratt (1969–1977); Bob Langley (1970–1972); Esther Rantzen (1970–1972); Bob Wellings (1971–1980); Bernard Falk (1972–1978); Valerie Singleton (1972–1978); Richard Stilgoe (1972–1978); Frank Bough (1972–1982); James Hogg (1972–1983); Sue Lawley (1972–1975 & 1978–1983); John Stapleton (1975–1980); Martin Young (1973–1979); Hugh Scully (1978–1983); Sue Cook (1980–1983); Richard Kershaw (1980–1983); David Dimbleby (1982); Laurie Mayer Roger Cook
- Country of origin: United Kingdom
- Original language: English

Production
- Production locations: Lime Grove Studios, London
- Editors: Michael Bunce (1970–1975); John Gau (1975–1978); Hugh Williams (1978–1981); Roger Bolton (1981–1983)
- Running time: 50 minutes

Original release
- Network: BBC1
- Release: 9 September 1969 – 5 August 1983

Related
- Watchdog

Nationwide is a BBC current affairs television programme that ran from 9 September 1969 until 5 August 1983. Originally broadcast on BBC1 from Tuesday to Thursday, and then each weekday from 1972, it followed the early evening news, and included the regional opt-out news programmes.

== Outline ==
It followed a magazine format, combining regional news, political analysis and discussion with consumer affairs, light entertainment and sports reporting. It began on 9 September 1969, running between Tuesdays and Thursdays at 6:00 pm, before being extended to five days a week in 1972. From 1976 until 1981, the start time was 5:55 pm. The final edition was broadcast on 5 August 1983 and, the following October, it was replaced by Sixty Minutes. The long-running Watchdog programme began as a Nationwide feature.

The light entertainment was quite similar in tone to That's Life!, with eccentric stories such as a skateboarding duck and men who claimed that they could walk on egg shells. Richard Stilgoe performed topical songs. The show's tendency to sidestep serious matters in favour of light pieces was parodied in an episode of Monty Python's Flying Circus, where the show, instead of reporting on the opening of the Third World War, chose to feature a story about a "theory" that sitting down in a comfortable chair rests one's legs.

After the introduction and round-up, the BBC regions opted out for their main news magazine programmes (Midlands Today, Points West, Wales Today, South Today, Look East, Reporting Scotland, Spotlight, Look North, Scene Around Six). Once they had handed back to Lime Grove Studios in London, the regions remained on standby to participate in feedback and two-way interviews to be transmitted across the whole BBC network.

The programme's second, and best remembered theme tune, was a library piece called The Good Word, composed by Johnny Scott.

The show was used in an influential cultural/media studies project at the University of Birmingham, known as The Nationwide Project.

== Nationwide for London and the South East ==
For all of its run, Nationwide presented and provided the regional news for the BBC London/South East region, as this was the only BBC region not to have its own dedicated news team.

A further peculiarity was that as this segment had no regional branding at all in London and the South East, it carried the Nationwide title despite covering only local news. Indeed, the first opening credits in 1969, which displayed the all the regional news programme titles, had simply "London" added at the end. Later credits omitted reference to any London programme at all. This changed at the start of 1982, when the regional programmes and Nationwide were separated. Now, Nationwide's title sequence was shown after the regional programmes and the London/South East news was now called South East at Six.

However, it was still presented by the Nationwide team, used the Nationwide theme and, for the first few months, the opening titles were the same as for Nationwide, but with local images superimposed. Later that year, when Nationwide introduced a new title sequence, South East at Six started using different graphics that had no reference to Nationwide, though still with the Nationwide music. When Nationwide was replaced by Sixty Minutes, the situation returned to how it had been before 1982 and lasted until 1984.

== Margaret Thatcher On the Spot ==
In May 1983, during a general election special of its "On the Spot" feature, Diana Gould, a teacher from Cirencester, persistently challenged Margaret Thatcher about her ordering of the sinking of the General Belgrano when it was sailing away from the Falklands.

Thatcher denied that the Belgrano had been sailing away, but Gould quoted map references and continued to push her point across, encouraged – so the Conservative Party claimed – by presenter Sue Lawley. When Thatcher asked her whether she accepted that the Belgrano had been a danger to British shipping when it was sunk, Gould told her that she did not.

Thatcher was extremely angry about the BBC for allowing the question. Thatcher's husband Denis lashed out at Roger Bolton, the editor of the programme, in the entertainment suite, saying that his wife had been "stitched up by bloody BBC poofs and Trots". Lawley said she was never permitted to interview Thatcher again, and later Thatcher refused an invitation to appear on Desert Island Discs, which Lawley was then presenting.

== Life Swap ==
A notable four-part segment called Life Swap aired in 1980 in which two women, London aristocrat Julia Stonor and Newcastle teacher Myra Robinson, swapped lives for a week. The segment was described by the Evening Chronicle as the United Kingdom's "first ever reality TV show".

== Archive status ==
As a contemporary programme Nationwide was recorded on broadcast videotape only in case of possible complaint or litigation; after a period of time tapes would be wiped and re-used although filmed reports were archived. Consequently, only a few complete editions exist in their original form.

However, in his book The Television Heritage (1989), author Steve Bryant claimed that "a virtually complete collection of the BBC magazine programme Nationwide from 1971 to 1980" existed as domestic recordings. (Note: When domestic video recorders had become available in the early 1970s, the BBC started making programme as broadcast (PasB) recordings of most news and current affairs programmes – until then only audio recordings had been made for future editorial review purposes.) He wrote:

"Already virtually doomed is material held on early domestic tape formats manufactured by Sony, Shibaden and Philips. The pictures from these tapes are very poor – indeed, the Sony and Shibaden reel-to-reel tapes are monochrome only – but some unique collections exist on these formats. Most significant is a virtually complete collection of the BBC magazine programme Nationwide from 1971 to 1980, mostly on Sony and Shibaden, but on Philips for the programmes after 1977. This collection is held by the NFA (National Film Archive) and represents the only copies of the complete programmes in existence. The BBC has all the film reports and a small selection of pre-recorded video inserts, but the programmes themselves were live and were not recorded off-air. Neither the machinery nor the funds are currently available to save the contents of these tapes, so a valuable daily record of British life in the 70s, including a large number of live interviews with leading politicians and celebrities of the time, looks like being lost."

The British Film Institute website stated in 2003 "so far we have successfully dubbed 500 [Philips] N-1500 [tapes] as part of an HLF-funded Nationwide preservation project". In November 2016, the BFI's holdings of Nationwide, described as being on an "exceptionally rare" video format, were included in a list of 100,000 most at risk television episodes which were to be digitised following £13.5 million of National Lottery funding.

== Documentaries ==
- Three Dates with Genesis, BBC2, 1978; a documentary following the progressive rock band Genesis for a portion of their 1978 tour.
- Let's Go Nationwide, BBC2, 1991; Transmitted as part of The Lime Grove Story, 26 August 1991, marking the closing of the studios
- It's Time to Go Nationwide, BBC4, 2009; Shown 5 February 2009

== See also ==
- The One Show
