= Timeline of the BBC World Service =

A timeline of notable events relating to the BBC World Service, the world's largest international broadcaster, which began broadcasting in 1932.

== 1930s ==
- 1932
  - 19 December – The Empire Service (precursor of the World Service) launches, broadcasting on shortwave from Daventry's Borough Hill.
  - 25 December – King George V becomes the first monarch to deliver a Christmas Day message by radio, on the Empire Service.
- 1938
  - 3 January – The BBC begins broadcasting its first foreign-language radio service, in Arabic.
  - 14 March – Portuguese for Brasil and Spanish for Latin America begin.
  - 4 June – Portuguese for Europe programmes begins.
  - 27 September – German, French and Italian programmes begin.
  - November – The Empire Service is renamed the BBC Overseas Service.
- 1939
  - 14 May – Afrikaans language programming begins.
  - 4 June – Portuguese for Africa programming begins.
  - 5 September – Hungarian language programming begins.
  - 7 September – Following the outbreak of World War II, the BBC launches its BBC Polish Section.
  - 30 September – Greek language programming begins.
  - 20 November – Turkish language programming begins.
  - 31 December – Czech language programming begins.

== 1940s ==
- 1940
  - 7 February – Bulgarian language programming begins.
  - 12 February – Swedish language programming begins.
  - 18 March – Finnish language programming begins.
  - 9 April – Danish and Norwegian programming begins.
  - 11 April – Dutch language programming begins.
  - 5 May – Cantonese Chinese programming begins.
  - 11 May – Programming in Hindi begins.
  - 12 May – Swedish language programming begins.
  - 28 July – Dutch programme Radio Oranje launches.
  - 10 August – Maltese programming begins.
  - 2 September – Burmese programming begins.
  - 15 September – Romanian programming begins.
  - 16 September – Greek for Cyprus programming begins.
  - 28 September – Belgian French & Belgian Dutch programming begins.
  - 12 November – Albanian programming begins with the launch of the BBC Albanian service.
  - 1 December – Icelandic programming begins.
  - 28 December – Persian programming begins.
- 1941
  - The BBC European Service moves to Bush House in Central London.
  - 22 April – Slovene programming begins.
  - 27 April – Thai programming begins.
  - 2 May – Malay programming begins.
  - 3 May – Tamil programming begins.
  - 5 May – Cantonese Chinese programming begins.
  - 19 May – Mandarin Chinese programming begins
  - 11 October – Bengali programming begins with the launch of BBC Bangla.
  - 31 December – Slovak programming begins.
- 1942
  - 1 March – Gujarati and Marathi programming begins.
  - 10 March – Sinhala programming begins.
  - 1 October – Hokkien Chinese programming begins.
  - 7 October – Programming in Russian begins.
  - 2 November – French for Canada programming begins.
- 1943
  - 29 March – German for Austria programming begins.
  - 26 May – Programming in Russian ends.
  - 29 May – Luxembourgish programming begins.
  - 4 July – Programming in Japanese begins.
- 1944
  - 27 February – BBC General Forces Programme replaces the BBC Forces Programme (also broadcast on shortwave).
  - 26 June – Icelandic programming ends.
  - 28 August – Dutch for Indonesia and French for South-East Asia programming begins.
  - 3 September – Gujarati programming ends.
- 1945
  - 1 January – Welsh for Patagonia, Argentina programming begins.
  - 2 April – Dutch for Indonesia programming ends.
- 1946
  - 25 May – Dutch for Indonesia programming resumes.
  - 26 May – Programming in Russian resumes.
  - 31 December – Welsh for Patagonia, Argentina programming ends.
- 1948
  - 7 February – Programmes in Hokkien Chinese end.
- 1949
  - 3 April – Urdu programming begins.
  - 30 October – Hebrew and Indonesian programming begins.

== 1950s ==
- 1951
  - 13 May – Dutch for Indonesia programming ends.
  - 3 June – Greek for Cyprus programming ends.
- 1952
  - 6 February – Vietnamese programming begins.
  - 30 March – Programming in Belgian French & Belgian Dutch ends.
  - 30 May – Programming in Luxembourgish ends.
- 1955
  - 3 April – French for South-East Asia programming ends.
- 1957
  - 13 March – Hausa language programming begins with the launch of BBC Hausa.
  - 27 July – Swahili language programming begins.
  - 18 July – The BBC Somali Service launches as a twice-weekly 15-minute programme.
  - 10 August – Danish, Dutch, Norwegian and Portuguese for Europe programming end.
  - 8 September – Afrikaans programming ends
  - 15 September – German for Austria programming ends.
- 1958
  - September – The BBC Somali Service begins daily broadcasts.
  - 25 December – Marathi programming ends.
- 1959
  - The World Service launches its first sports programme. Called Saturday Special, it runs for one hour in the Summer of 1959.

== 1960s ==
- 1960
  - 5 March – Thai programming ends.
  - 20 June – French for Africa programming begins.
- 1961
  - 4 March – Swedish programming ends.
- 1962
  - 3 June – Programming in Thai resumes.
- 1965
  - 1 May – The General Overseas Service is renamed the BBC World Service.
- 1966
  - The World Service's reach in Africa is expanded with the opening of the Ascension Island relay.
  - 4 July – Outlook is broadcast for the first time.
- 1967
  - 20 January – The BBC Albanian service ends.
- 1968
  - 28 October – Hebrew programming ends.
- 1969
  - 7 June – BBC Nepali launches as a weekly programme.

== 1970s ==
- 1970
  - BBC Nepali expands to a five days a week service.
- 1976
  - 30 March – Sinhala programming ends.
  - 25 December – English for the Caribbean programming begins.
- 1979
  - Sportsworld launches.
  - 7 July – Science in Action launches.

== 1980s ==
- 1980
  - 8 May – Programming in French for Canada ends.
- 1981
  - 15 August – Pashto programming begins.
  - 31 December – Programming in Italian and Maltese ends.
- 1982
  - 28 September – Transmissions end from Crowborough following the switching-on of, and final transfer of transmitting operations on 648 kHz MW to, Orfordness. Orfordness was seen as being a better location due to it being on the Suffolk coast, whereas Crowborough was inland. This transmitter change means that the World Service becomes available to UK listeners for the first time, albeit only for people in south east England.
- 1985
  - August – For the first time in its history the World service is taken off air due to strike action in protest at the British government's decision to ban a documentary featuring an interview with Martin McGuinness of Sinn Féin.
- 1987
  - The BBC World Service launches BBC 648 from the Orfordness transmitting station. The service provides a tailor-made service for northern Europe featuring some French and German programming interwoven with the main output in English.
- 1988
  - For many years, the World Service had been available for part of BBC Radio 4's overnight downtime on that station's long wave frequency. However, by the start of 1988, the World Service is now heard throughout the full overnight period when Radio 4 is not on air. Consequently, for the first time, the World Service is available on long wave across the UK between 12:45am and 5:55am.
  - Newshour launches.
- 1989
  - 1 April – The BBC launches BBC TV Europe, a subscription-based pan-European television station.

== 1990s ==
- 1990
  - 11 March – Programming in Sinhala resumes.
- 1991
  - 16 January – Upon the outbreak of the Gulf War, the BBC begins a BBC Radio 4 News FM which is broadcast in the UK on BBC Radio 4 FM frequencies and around the world on the World Service.
  - 2 March – At 18:00 GMT, BBC Radio 4 News FM closes and programming on the World Service returns to its usual output.
  - 31 March – Japanese programming ends after 48 years and Malay language programming ends after 50 years.
  - 15 April – The BBC World Service Television news service is launched. Unlike World Service radio which is funded by direct grant from the Foreign and Commonwealth Office, WSTV is commercially funded and carries advertising, which means that it cannot be broadcast in the UK.
  - 29 September – Programmes in Croatian and Serbian begin.
  - 14 October – World Service TV launches its Asian service.
  - The first broadcasts of Europe Today take place.
- 1992
  - 1 June – BBC Ukrainian launches.
  - June – The World Service launches a programming covering the Wimbledon Championships called Sportsworld at Wimbledon.
  - The BBC World Service is broadcast regularly on FM in the UK for the first time when it begins to be carried overnight on BBC Local Radio.
- 1993
  - 20 February – The BBC Albanian service is relaunched after being off air for 26 years.
  - November – The World Service's monthly listings magazine London Calling is replaced with a 100-page colour magazine and is renamed BBC Worldwide. It is later renamed to BBC On Air.
- 1994
  - 8 September – Kinyarwanda programming begins.
  - 30 November – Azerbaijani and Uzbek programming begins.
- 1995
  - 26 January – BBC World Service Television is renamed BBC World and is launched as an international free-to-air news channel at 19:00 GMT.
  - 31 March – French programming ends.
  - 1 April – Kazakh and Kyrgyz programming begins.
  - 27 September – The BBC begins regular Digital Audio Broadcasting, initially just from the Crystal Palace transmitting station. Consequently, the World Service becomes available to listeners across the UK on a 24/7 basis for the first time.
- 1996
  - 6 January – Macedonian programming begins.
  - 9 June – A Sunday edition of Sportsworld launches.
- 1997
  - March – The first edition of Everywoman is broadcast.
  - 4 November – Debut of the BBC World Service soap Westway.
  - 31 December – The Finnish service ends after 57 years.
- 1998
  - Following the recent commencement of the World Service being heard overnight on BBC Radio 4's FM frequencies, the overnight transmission on BBC Local Radio ends. It is replaced with a simulcast of BBC Radio 5 Live.
- 1999
  - BBC 648, which provided French and German language content for northern Europe from the Orfordness transmitting station, ends with the closure of the BBC's German service. – the French for Europe service had closed in 1995. Consequently, all programming from this transmitter is in English only.
  - The World Today is broadcast for the first time.

== 2000s ==
- 2001
  - Technology programme Go Digital launches.
  - 1 July – The World Service ends short wave radio transmission directed to North America and Australasia. It says that "changing listening habits" are the reason for this decision. A shortwave listener coalition formed to oppose the change.
- 2002
  - August – The first edition of World Book Club is broadcast.
- 2004
  - December – The final edition of the World Service's magazine BBC On Air is published.
- 2005
  - 5 October – It is announced that broadcasts in a number of European languages will end by March 2006, to finance the launch in 2007 of TV news services in Arabic and Persian.
  - 10 October – The BBC's Latin American service is renamed BBC Mundo.
  - October – The BBC World Service soap opera Westway comes to an end after eight years on air.
  - 16 December – Kazakh programming ends.
  - 23 December – Polish programming ends after 66 years and Slovene programming ends after 64 years.
  - 30 December – Bulgarian programming ends after 65 years.
  - 31 December – Hungarian and Greek programming end, both after 66 years and Slovak programmes ends after 64 years.
- 2006
  - 13 January – Thai programming ends for a second time.
  - 31 January – Croatian programming ends.
  - 28 February – Czech programming ends.
  - April – The final edition of Everywoman is broadcast. Archived episodes of the programme have since been made available on the BBC website.
  - October – The first edition of World Have Your Say is broadcast.
- 2008
  - 18 February – The World Service ends analogue short wave broadcasting in Europe.
  - 6 April – Discussion programme The Forum debuts.
  - 1 August – Romanian broadcasts end after 69 years.
  - 27 October – A new daily arts magazine programme The Strand is launched.

== 2010s ==
- 2010
  - September – The BBC announces that Sportsworld at Wimbledon is to be axed as a cost-cutting measure.
- 2011
  - January – The closure of the Albanian, Macedonian, Portuguese for Africa, Serbian and Caribbean services is announced. All of these services close over the next three months. This reflected the financial situation the Corporation faced following transfer of responsibility for the Service from the Foreign Office, so that it would in future have been funded from within licence fee income.
  - 25 March – Europe Today is broadcast for the final time after 20 years on air.
  - 27 March – These budget cuts also result in the switching off of the Orfordness transmitting station in Suffolk, which had been transmitting the BBC World Service on 648 kHz MW to much of northern Europe since 1982.
  - 29 March – Technology programme Go Digital is renamed Click (later in 2019 renamed for the third time to Digital Planet).
  - Also in 2011, the Russian, Ukrainian, Mandarin Chinese, Turkish, Vietnamese, Azeri, and Spanish for Cuba services ceased radio broadcasting, and the Hindi, Indonesian, Kyrgyz, Nepali, Swahili, Kinyarwanda and Kirundi services ceased shortwave transmissions.
- 2012
  - 12 July – The BBC World Service relocates to Broadcasting House after 70 years at Bush House.
  - 23 July – Newsday is broadcast for the first time. It replaces The World Today and Network Africa.
- 2013
  - 29 March – Daily arts magazine programme The Strand ends, with coverage of the arts integrated into Outlook.
  - 1 April
    - World Briefing, the World Service's standard 30-minute news bulletin, is cancelled and replaced by The Newsroom.
    - Outlook is extended and now runs for just under an hour.
  - 28 October – BBC OS launches. The new programme says that it "aims to open up the news process, enabling people to discover the latest on the stories that matter to them."
- 2014
  - 1 April – The World Service stops being funded by the UK Government grant and is now funded by the television licence fee and the profits of BBC Worldwide Ltd. although the Government is providing limited funding until 2020.
  - 10 July – Thai programming recommences, but only on social media.
- 2015
  - 17 January – The first edition of a new cricket show Stumped, timed to coincide with the 2015 Cricket World Cup, is broadcast.
- 2016
  - November – The BBC announces the largest expansion of foreign language programming since the 1940s.
- 2017
  - 21 August – The first of the new language services start broadcasting when transmissions in Nigerian Pidgin begin.
  - 18 September – Programming in Afaan Oromoo and Tigrinya begin.
  - 26 September – Korean programming begins.
  - 2 October
    - After 73 years off air, Gujarati programming resumes and after 59 years off air, Marathi programming resumes.
    - Programming in Punjabi and Telugu begin.
- 2018
  - 19 February – Programming in Igbo and Yoruba begins.
- 2019
  - 1 May – Technology programme Click reverts to its original name of Digital Planet.

== 2020s ==
- 2022
  - Following the 2022 Russian invasion of Ukraine, the BBC begins broadcasting World Service English programming at shortwave frequencies 15735 kHz and 5875 kHz for receivers in Ukraine and parts of Russia.
- 2023
  - 27 January – The radio service of BBC Arabic ends after 85 years on air.
