= Anna Foster (journalist) =

English news presenter (born 1979)

- Born: South Shields, Tyne and Wear, England
- Occupation: Journalist

Anna Foster is an English journalist, news reporter and presenter. Since 2025, she has presented the Today programme and presents and reports on location for BBC News. Previously, she presented Drive and other programming on BBC Radio 5 Live, was a regular presenter of the News at One, and was the BBC's Middle East correspondent in Beirut.

== Early life and education ==
The daughter of an engineer father and a mother who worked as a nurse, Anna Foster and her brother were born in South Shields. Educated in South Shields, she attended South Tyneside College for A-levels, and went on to study at Collingwood College at Durham University, where she worked on student radio. She then undertook a postgraduate certificate in journalism at City University London.

== Career ==
Foster joined BBC Radio Cleveland as a reporter for three years, before becoming a news presenter, and then presenting the drive-time show. She then joined BBC Radio 5 Live as a regional North East reporter, before relocating to London to present Newsbeat.

Foster joined the BBC Radio 5 Live Weekend Breakfast show on 23 April 2011, replacing Rachel Burden who moved to the weekday 5 Live Breakfast team alongside Nicky Campbell on 3 May.

On 14 November 2012, Foster became the Wednesday-to-Friday co-presenter of 5 Live Drive (4–7 pm) alongside Peter Allen; Louise Minchin was the Monday and Tuesday co-host. Foster subsequently became the permanent co-host, alongside Tony Livesey who replaced Allen in October 2014.

Foster left Drive on 12 August 2021 to take up a new role as BBC Middle East correspondent in Beirut.

In May 2024, the BBC announced that Foster was one of six well-known BBC presenters to start presenting the BBC News at One from its new home at Salford studios at the beginning of June 2024.

In March 2025, Foster was announced as one of five presenters of BBC Radio 4's Today programme, replacing Mishal Husain.

== Personal life ==
She married fellow radio presenter John Foster in October 2009 at Crathorne Hall near Yarm, North Yorkshire; they have a son and a daughter.
