= Julian Holland =

Julian Holland may refer to:

- Jools Holland (Julian Miles Holland, born 1958), English musician and television presenter
- Julian Holland (journalist) (1925–2001), British journalist and radio editor
- Julian Holland (boxer) (born 1972), Australia boxer
- Julian Holland (author) (born 1946), English author
