= Late Night Woman's Hour =

- Country of origin: United Kingdom
- Language: English
- Home station: BBC Radio 4
- Hosted by: Jane Garvey (2015}; Lauren Laverne (2015–2018); Emma Barnett (2018–present)
- Recording studio: Broadcasting House, London, UK
- Original release: June 2015
- Audio format: Stereo
- Website: www.bbc.co.uk/programmes/p05nrmhm
- Podcast: www.bbc.co.uk/programmes/p05nrmhm/episodes/downloads

Late Night Woman's Hour (LNWH) is a late-night edition of the long-running, BBC Radio 4 programme Woman's Hour. It started in 2015 with a one-month pilot run, scheduled twice-weekly on Thursday and Friday at 11 pm for one hour. The presenters for this first run were Lauren Laverne and Jane Garvey who led panels of five guests in discussion of a particular topic such as fan fiction or lust. Lauren Laverne then became the permanent host when the programme started a regular schedule in 2016, being scheduled as a monthly podcast which was then broadcast on Radio 4 at 11 pm on the last Thursday of each month.

The topics discussed in the first run included the dating app, Tinder, and lying. The conversation was frank and adult, being broadcast late at night, rather than during the daytime.

In 2018, Late Night Woman's Hour became available in a weekly podcast format via BBC Sounds as well as other podcast apps. Guests include technology evangelist Dr Sue Black, Guardian beauty columnist Sali Hughes, writer and broadcaster Afua Hirsch, influencer Chidera Eggerue, author and blogger Emma Gannon, Elle Deputy Editor Kenya Hunt, journalist Miranda Sawyer and writer and comedian Viv Groskop.

In autumn 2018, Radio 5 Live broadcaster and journalist Emma Barnett took over from Lauren Laverne as presenter.
