= Paul Barnes (broadcaster) =

British broadcaster and journalist

Paul Barnes (1939-2025) was a British broadcaster and journalist. During his career, he presented on both radio and television.

== Background ==
Barnes was born in July 1939 in Coventry. He attended Leamington College and Coventry College of Art.

== Career ==
Prior to working as a broadcaster, Barnes worked in documentary film production, advertising and publishing.

Barnes's career in broadcasting spanned 49 years. Barnes's first radio broadcast took place in 1969. Following this first broadcast, Barnes then became presenter of Out of this Week on BBC Radio 4. Barnes began presenting Sunday in 1972. Barnes was the first presenter of Newsbeat on BBC Radio 1 in 1973. Barnes worked as a presenter and/or reporter on Jazz Notes, Outlook, Sunday, Woman's Hour, The World at One, Today and several other radio programmes during his radio career; Barnes presented Today between 1975 and 1977. In the 1970s, Barnes worked as a reporter for Woman's Hour.

Barnes's career in television began when he was appointed a presenter on Granada TV in Manchester in the very early 1970s. At ITV, Barnes presented Folio, Anything Goes and The Village Show. In approximately 1997, Barnes began presenting a show on BBC Local Radio in the East of England called The Late Paul Barnes, which in 2009 was broadcast between 11pm and 1am at the weekend. The show always involved Barnes signing off in the same way and focused on jazz and big band music. In 2011, Barnes received a jazz broadcaster of the year award. Barnes left the BBC in 2018.

Barnes also once managed a school, for training people to become pilots, at Norwich Airport.

== Death ==
In March 2025, it was announced that Barnes had died.

== Personal life ==
Barnes was married until his death to Helen McDermott, who was also a broadcaster.
