= John Humphrys =

Welsh broadcaster, journalist and author (born 1943)

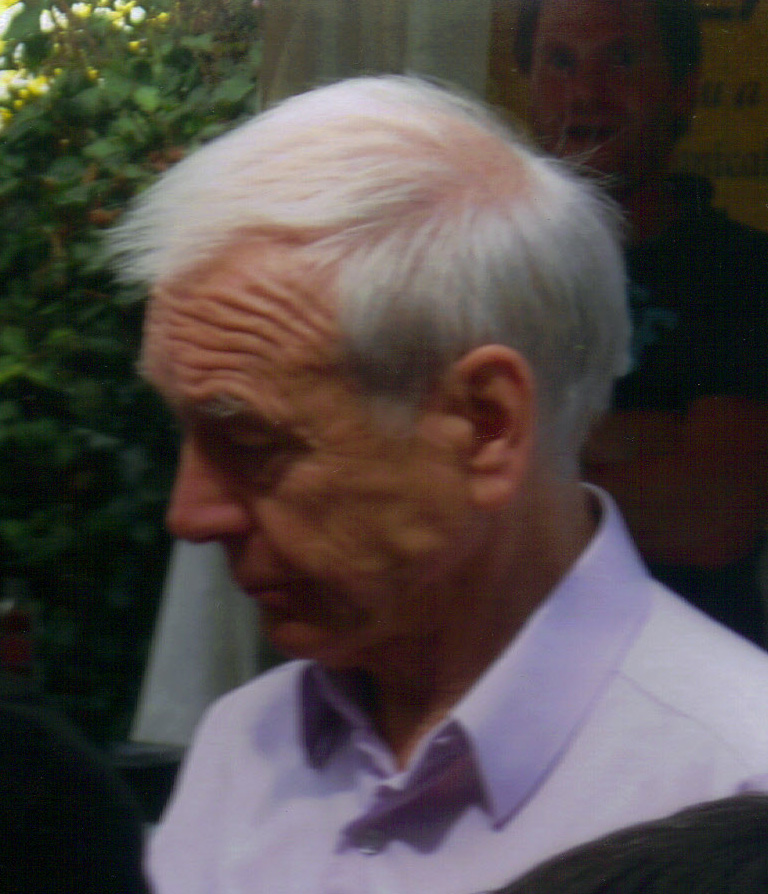
- Humphrys in 2012
- Born: Desmond John Humphrys; 17 August 1943 (age 83); Adamsdown, Cardiff, Wales
- Education: Cardiff High School
- Occupations: Journalist; presenter
- Years active: 1966–present
- Employer: BBC
- Agent: Kruger Cowne Ltd
- Notable credit(s): BBC Nine O'Clock News (1981–1987); Today (1987–2019); Mastermind (2003–2021); Celebrity Mastermind (2003–2021)
- Spouse: Edna Wilding (m. 1964, divorced)
- Children: 3
- Relatives: Bob Humphrys (brother)

Desmond John Humphrys (born 17 August 1943) is a Welsh broadcaster. From 1981 to 1987 he was the main presenter of the Nine O'Clock News, the flagship BBC News television programme, and from 1987 until 2019 he presented on the BBC Radio 4 breakfast programme Today. He was the host of the BBC Two television quiz show Mastermind from 2003 to 2021, for a total of 735 episodes. Humphrys now presents a regular Sunday afternoon show on Classic FM, where he also sometimes fills in on the weekday More Music Breakfast show.

Humphrys has a reputation as having been an outspoken and challenging interviewer; occasionally politicians have, after being subjected to a tough interview on live radio, been critical of his style.

== Early life and career ==
Humphrys was born into a working-class environment in Cardiff, at 193 Pearl Street, Adamsdown, son of Winifred Mary (Matthews), a hairdresser, and Edward George Humphrys, a self-employed Conservative-voting French polisher. He was one of five children. During early life Humphrys had a bout of whooping cough and, concerned that he would be known as 'Dismal Desmond', his mother opted to use the name John. His parents encouraged him to do his homework and he passed the eleven plus exam. He became a pupil at Cardiff High School (then a grammar school), but he did not fit into the middle-class environment there. He was an average pupil and left school at 15, choosing not to go to university and instead became a reporter with the Penarth Times, a weekly newspaper that focused on local news in the town of Penarth, a seaside resort south of Cardiff.

Humphrys later joined the Western Mail, a larger regional newspaper based in Cardiff. He joined Television Wales and the West (TWW), a commercial television channel based in Wales, and was the first reporter on the scene of the Aberfan disaster, which killed 144 people and destroyed entire parts of a town, in October 1966.

== Career at the BBC ==
Humphrys joined the BBC later in 1966 as the district reporter for Liverpool and the north-west, where he reported on the dock strikes of that time, sometimes for the national news. He then worked as a foreign correspondent, initially having to go abroad and leave his family for six-to-nine-month periods at a time when his children were still young and growing up. Later he took his family with him to the United States and South Africa where he was sent to open a news bureau. He reported the resignation of president Richard Nixon in 1974 on television by satellite from the United States, and the execution of Gary Gilmore in 1977; later, when based in South Africa, he reported on the end of Rhodesia and the creation of the new nation of Zimbabwe. Humphrys became disillusioned with living in hotels and life on-the-road as a foreign correspondent, and returned to London in 1980 to take up the post of BBC Diplomatic Correspondent.

In 1981, he became the main presenter of the BBC's flagship Nine O'Clock News. This appointment marked a change in the BBC's approach to news broadcasting. With the appointment of Humphrys and John Simpson, the presenters of the news became part of the process of preparing the broadcast, rather than just reading a prepared script as with previous presenters. In addition to this, Humphrys also briefly read the midweek classified football results. Humphrys began presenting Today in January 1987, joining Brian Redhead. He still made occasional appearances fronting BBC Television news bulletins in the 1990s. During the 1991 Gulf War, he was a volunteer presenter on the BBC Radio 4 News FM service.

From 1993, he presented the weekly On The Record political TV show until its demise in 2002. He was the subject of This Is Your Life in January 2001 when he was surprised by Michael Aspel while presenting an edition of On The Record at the BBC Television Centre. He also appeared on Series 1 Episode 5 of Da Ali G Show, which aired on 28 April 2000.

Humphrys has also presented Panorama and was the presenter of the revived version of the game show Mastermind between 2003 and 2021. He became the programme's fourth regular host, succeeding Magnus Magnusson, Peter Snow and Clive Anderson.

Humphrys is an agnostic, but has said that he has a curiosity to test his agnosticism and challenge established religions to see if they can restore his childhood belief in God. In 2006, he presented a BBC Radio 4 programme, titled Humphrys in Search of God, in which he spoke to leading British authorities on Christianity, Judaism and Islam in order to try to restore his faith.

On 12 November 2009, he became a temporary replacement for David Dimbleby as the host of Question Time when Dimbleby was recovering from an injury. On 3 January 2011, Humphrys announced that he had extended his contract to present the Today programme, but in doing so had agreed to a pay cut. In 2014, he appeared as himself in The Life of Rock with Brian Pern.

Humphry's interview with the Director-General of the BBC George Entwistle on 11 November 2012 on the Today programme was widely reported to have been a major factor in Entwistle's resignation later that day. In the interview, Entwistle admitted he was unaware of a Newsnight investigation which wrongly accused a senior Conservative figure of child abuse until after it was broadcast. The report came about during the unfolding of the Jimmy Savile sexual abuse scandal, which was also considered a factor that contributed to Entwistle's resignation.

On the day of the interview, Humphrys' co-presenter James Naughtie recalled "It was electric in that studio. There were three of us sitting there, George, John and me. And I think all three of us knew we could see a man destroying his own job, on the spot. He was at sea. And it was a deeply uncomfortable 10 minutes." Humphrys later said: "I know it was said in the papers the following morning that he had been humiliated. I didn't set out to humiliate him, of course I didn't."

In a March 2014 interview with the Radio Times, Humphrys noted some of the biases at the BBC, describing it as "broadly liberal as opposed to broadly conservative". He highlighted failings in coverage of the issues of Europe and immigration, stating: "We weren't sufficiently sceptical – that's the most accurate phrase – of the pro-European case. We bought into the European ideal. We weren't sufficiently sceptical about the pro-immigration argument. We didn't look at the potential negatives with sufficient rigour."

In February 2019, Humphrys announced that he was to leave the Today programme, saying that he should have quit "years ago". He hosted his final edition on 19 September, when his interviewees were Tony Blair, Dame Edna Everage and David Cameron.

On 6 February 2021, in his Daily Mail column, Humphrys announced he would leave his position on Mastermind after 18 years of hosting the programme. His 735th and final episode of the show aired on 26 April 2021. He was replaced by TV presenter Clive Myrie, who made his debut on 23 August 2021.

== Other interests ==
Humphrys has written several books, including Lost for Words, in which he criticises what he sees as the widespread misuse of the English language, plus Devil's Advocate, Beyond Words, The Great Food Gamble and In God We Doubt: Confessions of a Failed Atheist. In September 2019, he released his memoir A Day Like Today, which included his views on the internal political climate at the BBC.

He played himself in the 2013 crime thriller film Closed Circuit with Eric Bana playing the lead.

After leaving the BBC, Humphrys joined the Daily Mail as a weekly columnist and became a presenter on Classic FM on Sunday afternoons between 3 pm and 5 pm.

Humphrys is a keen gardener who makes his home-made compost and uses his own urine to water his lawn.

Humphrys founded Kitchen Table Charities Trust (KTCT) in 2005. The charity collects donations and distributes small grants to projects mostly in Sub-Saharan Africa.

== Political views ==
Humphrys has been described as a "natural liberal" and does not view himself as conservative, saying; "I am not conservative, you know. I am genuinely one of those pathetic people who has very strong views about issues".

He also stated that his political views are heavily influenced by what he sees and who he talks to as a reporter. "So every other bloody week I change my mind about something or other, and when you vote, you look for the party that comes closest to what you believe."

When asked if he was happy with having the extracts of his books published in the Daily Mail, Humphrys responded, saying: "Yes. They did and they not only did that, but they also sought my approval. I was not particularly happy with the splash [the headline] the Mail used, but you know… I don't give a flying fuck whether people think that a particular newspaper is biased in this way or that way. All I'm concerned with is that my material is presented in the way I've written it and they didn't change a word."

He also responded to a further question titled "Do you understand why some people don't like the Daily Mail?" saying that he has always read the Daily Mail simply because it reaches an awful lot of people, and that it may not always be compatible with his own views, but said that he also thinks the same about The Guardian, which hosted the interview.

He views himself as feminist, stating in 2019: "I detest the word feminism, because of course I'm a feminist. God, why does one have to say it?"

In September 2026 he presented the Channel 4 documentary, The Royals: Time To Go?, in which he advocated the case for electing a president as the head of state.

== Personal life ==
Humphrys married Edna Wilding (August 1942 – September 1997) in 1964 and they had two children, a son and daughter, Christopher and Catherine. Their marriage broke down in the late 1980s. Wilding died of cancer in Glamorgan, South Wales; Humphrys described her last days in a hospice in his book Devil's Advocate (2000). Humphrys' son Christopher is now a professional cellist, while his daughter Catherine is a professional vegan chef.

On 2 June 2000, when he was 56 years old, Humphrys and his then partner, Valerie Sanderson, had a son, Owen James. Sanderson was a newsreader with news programme Spotlight, then with BBC News 24, and is now a radio producer. Humphrys had a reverse vasectomy. He referred to these facts on 31 October 2006 on BBC Radio 4 in the programme Humphrys in Search of God. He and Sanderson subsequently separated. In 2009, he began a relationship with the journalist Catherine Bennett, a contributor to The Observer. He lives in Hammersmith, west London.

Humphrys' brother, Bob Humphrys, was a sports television presenter on BBC Wales Today. He died of lung cancer in Cardiff on 19 August 2008, aged 56. In December 2013, Humphrys was featured in an episode of the BBC Wales series Coming Home where it was revealed that their great-grandmother, Sarah Willey, had been a resident at the Cardiff workhouse and that their paternal great-grandfather was from Finland.

Humphrys is a keen listener to classical music and was a guest on the BBC Radio 4 show Desert Island Discs on 6 January 2008. His favourite record on the show was Elgar's Cello Concerto.

== Awards ==
Humphrys has won a number of industry awards, including being named Journalist of the Year in February 2000 at an awards ceremony organised by The House and Channel 4, the Gold Sony Radio Award in 2003, and a silver platter for Crystal Clear Broadcasting from the Plain English Campaign.

He holds an honorary degree from Abertay University, which is located in Dundee, Scotland.

== Bibliography ==
- Humphrys, John (2000). Devil's Advocate. London: Arrow Books. ISBN 0-09-927965-7.
- Humphrys, John (2001). The Great Food Gamble. London: Coronet Books. ISBN 0-340-77046-5.
- Humphrys, John (2004). Lost For Words: The Mangling and Manipulating of the English Language. London: Hodder & Stoughton. ISBN 0-340-83658-X.
- Humphrys, John (2006). Beyond Words: How Language Reveals the Way We Live Now. London: Hodder & Stoughton. ISBN 0-340-92375-X.
- Humphrys, John (2008). In God We Doubt: Confessions of a Failed Atheist. London: Hodder & Stoughton. ISBN 978-0-340-95126-2.
- Humphrys, John; Humphrys, Christopher (2009). Blue Skies & Black Olives. London: Hodder & Stoughton. ISBN 978-0-340-97882-5.
- Humphrys, John; Jarvis, Sarah (2009). The Welcome Visitor: Living Well, Dying Well (1st ed.). Hodder & Stoughton. ISBN 978-0-340-92377-1.
- Humphrys, John (2019). A Day Like Today: Memoirs. London: William Collins. ISBN 978-0007415571.

Media offices
Preceded by Magnus Magnusson	Host of Mastermind; 2003–2021	Succeeded by Clive Myrie
Preceded by John Timpson	Today presenter 1987–2019 with Brian Redhead, Peter Hobday, Sue MacGregor, Anna Ford, James Naughtie, Edward Stourton, Sarah Montague, Carolyn Quinn, Evan Davis, Justin Webb and Mishal Husain	Succeeded by N/A
