= Peter Allen (UK broadcaster) =

English radio broadcaster

- Born: 4 February 1946 (age 80); Rochford, Essex, England
- Occupation: Radio broadcaster

Peter Edwin Allen (born 4 February 1946) is an English radio broadcaster with 40 years' experience in journalism. He has been with BBC Radio 5 Live since it started in 1994, and co-presented the Drive programme for 16 years from 1998 to 2014.

== Early life ==
Allen was born in Rochford, Essex, and attended the independent Brentwood School. At 18 he left school and started work with his local newspaper. He emigrated to Australia and worked for the Sydney Daily Telegraph.

== Broadcasting career ==
In the 1970s Allen switched to working in radio, joining Independent Radio News, the newly launched news service for UK commercial radio. He eventually became the network's political editor while working at Westminster. He also worked as a presenter at its sister radio station LBC, the London news and talk station. Allen then switched to television and was ITN political correspondent until 1992, when he was one of "a string of high-profile resignations" following the company's budget cuts. He then joined London News Network.

On 1 March 1994, the BBC announced that Allen was to host its new Breakfast programme on BBC Radio 5 Live. In 1997 Breakfast was extended by half an hour. Also in 1997, The Times described the "witty repartee" of Allen and co-presenter (and future protagonist) Jane Garvey as the best illustration of the station's tone, "friendly, informal, brisk, and mercifully, not terribly politically correct".

On 31 August 1997, Allen and James Naughtie hosted the BBC Radio coverage of the death of Diana, Princess of Wales which saw Radios 2, 3, 4 and 5 Live taking a single programme. This coverage won a Sony Award for best news event. During 13 years working together at Five Live, following Breakfast with Drive, Allen and Garvey won six Sony Awards including the Gold award for news broadcaster of the year in 2002.

In 2007, newspapers cited unnamed sources which said that Allen had been rejected as John Humphrys' replacement on BBC Radio 4's Today programme because he was not "posh enough" and did not have an Oxbridge background. A BBC spokesperson responded "The reason we are not commenting is that it is about whether or not someone went for a job that may or not exist. Consequently, we cannot really get into it."

He has been with the network since 1994 and was the co-presenter of BBC Radio 5 Live's Drive programme for more than 16 years, from September 1998 to October 2014. He also chairs conferences and hosts events and award ceremonies, as well as performing as an after-dinner speaker. In July 2014 the BBC announced that he was moving to a morning slot for three days a week, replacing Victoria Derbyshire who was leaving the station.

In August 2015, Allen presented a live programme from Hiroshima on the 70th anniversary of the dropping of the atomic bomb, speaking to several survivors of the attack and an American physicist who helped to design the bombs in the Manhattan Project.

From November 2016, Allen co-hosted a 5 Live Sunday evening programme with Jane Garvey. From January 2018 to September 2019 he co-hosted a Sunday evening programme on the same station, Peter Allen and Caroline Barker, in which the presenters were to "delve into the personalities behind the headlines".
