= Julian Holland (journalist) =

British journalist (1925–2001)

Julian Holland (1925–2001) was an English journalist and radio editor. He was the editor of BBC Radio 4's Today programme from 1981 to 1986.

== Early life ==
Holland was born in Farnworth in Lancashire on 29 March 1925; his father was a printer whose business was badly hit by the Great Depression. The family moved to Bolton and then to Birmingham, where Holland attended King Edward's School; there, he befriended Kenneth Tynan.

== Career ==
On leaving school at the age of 18, Holland began working at the BBC (he was unable to serve in the military during the Second World War due to eyesight problems). He worked on Radio Newsreel before leaving the BBC in 1954 to work in print journalism, which appealed to his more varied interests (including sport, jazz and the theatre). He worked for the London Evening Standard, before joining the Daily Mail in 1962, eventually becoming the feature and leader writer (he also wrote a column on jazz under the pseudonym James Greenwood, which he also used to write for the Evening Standard in the 1970s). In 1966, he received Hannen Swaffer Award for descriptive writer of the year. He was also a contributing writer for That Was the Week That Was, for which he (with the other writers) received the Writers' Guild of Great Britain Award in 1963.

After being fired from the Mail in 1971, he returned to the BBC as a producer and editor on its news and current affairs radio programme The World at One; As The Times later wrote, the move facilitated what became the "most successful" period in Holland's career. In 1981, he was appointed editor of the Today programme on BBC Radio 4 and, despite competition from breakfast television, he retained audience figures; he introduced "hard-nosed" journalistic techniques and believed in putting "awkward" questions to politicians (though he disliked interviews when they became too confrontational). Brian Redhead and John Timpson led, with Holland recruiting Peter Hobday as a third member in 1982. Today received the Sony Award in 1985, the year before Holland retired from the BBC.

Holland had a reputation for being "fearlessly confrontational" and "pugnacious", though also loyal to friends. He died on 2 November 2001; he was survived by his second wife, the producer Carole Lacey (his first marriage to Rosemary Say having ended in divorce) and two daughters from his first marriage.
