= Valerie Sanderson =

Journalist and broadcaster

- Born: 1960 (age 65–66); Nottingham, England
- Education: University of St Andrews; Emory University
- Occupations: Journalist; presenter
- Notable credit: The Newsroom
- Children: 1

Valerie Sanderson (born 1960) is one of the main presenters of The Newsroom (and previously World Briefing) on the BBC World Service. Sanderson was one of the original presenters on BBC News 24 when it launched in 1997.

== Early life ==
Sanderson studied at the University of St Andrews, then completed a postgraduate degree at Emory University as a Robert T. Jones Scholar in Atlanta, Georgia.

== BBC ==
She joined the BBC in 1985 as a producer on Radio 4's Today programme. She has also been a reporter on the Today programme and BBC's Breakfast News. She was on the Spotlight programme based in Plymouth from 1989 and helped to launch BBC Radio 5 Live in 1994. Sanderson was one of the launch presenters for BBC News 24 in 1997 and could often be seen presenting the 1-4pm slot on News 24 alongside Bill Turnbull or Chris Eakin. Sanderson was on air live at the news desk on September 11, 2001 reporting on the first plane that struck tower one and confused the second airplane as it hit the tower live on air for a helicopter. Stunned news staff in the background could be heard shouting " oh no"! as she struggled to comprehend what she was witnessing.

Sanderson was one of the main presenters of World Briefing on the BBC World Service. She occasionally presents the BBC's daily audio news podcast Newspod. In April 2013 World Briefing was replaced by The Newsroom which Sanderson continues to present.

== Personal life ==
She was the partner of Radio Four's Today programme presenter John Humphrys, but they subsequently separated. They have one child.
