= Sunday (radio programme) =

British radio programme

Sunday is a radio programme currently broadcast on BBC Radio 4 on Sunday mornings between 7.10 and 7.55 am.

== Content ==
It features discussions of religious and ethical topics, looking in particular at those currently in the news. Although broadcast on a Sunday, the programme does not restrict itself to exclusively Christian stories and perspectives, but includes guest speakers from a variety of different religions.

=== Presentation ===
Its chief presenter is William Crawley. Other presenters have included Edward Stourton, Paul Barnes, Trevor J. Barnes, Roger Bolton, Andrew Green, Ted Harrison, Alison Hilliard, Clive Jacobs, Jane Little, Chris Morgan, Colin Morris, Gerry Northam, Gerald Priestland, and Libby Purves.

== History ==
It was first broadcast on 6 September 1970. It was the first British religious magazine radio programme for over six years. The Sunday broadcast, in 1970, was from 8.20am to 8.50am.

In 1970, 'Sunday' was presented by the film director Paul Barnes, with music from the folk music group Magna Carta.

=== Earlier series ===
It replaced the 'Sing Alleluia' programme, which had previously been on at 8.20am, and which was later moved to Radio 2. 'Sing Alleluia' had itself started on Sunday 5 April 1970, and was only on VHF. On 202 metres LW was 'Make Yourself at Home', for listeners from overseas, also known as Apna Hi Ghar Samajhiye, which was broadcast until 1986, and had a television version.

Previously on VHF, from 8.10am on Sundays was a programme called 'The Eye Witness', which varied with other two 15-minute programmes called 'Sunday Workshop' and 'Folkspin'; these three programmes had broadcast, from when Radio 4 had begun, in October 1967.

'Sing Alleluia' began again on Sunday 6 December 1970 at 8.30am on Radio 2, preceded by 'As Prescribed' with Dudley Savage from 8am on Sundays.
