= BBC Radio 4 News FM =

Former BBC temporary radio news service during the Gulf War (1991)

- United Kingdom
- Broadcast area: United Kingdom – national FM
- Frequency: FM: 92–95 MHz

Programming
- Format: Rolling news

Ownership
- Owner: BBC

History
- First air date: 17 January 1991
- Last air date: 2 March 1991

BBC Radio 4 News FM was the national BBC station devoted to rolling news service that was on air during the Gulf War from 16 January until 2 March 1991. It was broadcast on Radio 4's FM frequencies, whilst regular scheduled non-news BBC Radio 4 programming continued on longwave. This station was also broadcast on BBC World Service. At the time, some journalists gave it the nickname Scud FM from the Scud missiles used by Iraqi forces in the war.

The long-term impact of BBC Radio 4 News FM was that the popularity of the station was taken as evidence that a rolling news service was required at the BBC, and three years later, the BBC launched a continuous news and sport station, BBC Radio 5 Live.

== History ==
=== Operation ===
When Coalition forces began military operations against Iraq following the invasion of Kuwait, the BBC discontinued to broadcast its usual mixed schedule on Radio 4's FM frequencies and replaced it with a rolling news service, known by the emergency staff as Scud FM after "Saddam Hussein's most notorious weapon" the Soviet-made missile which Iraq was firing at the Israeli city of Tel Aviv.

BBC staff had managed to launch a 17 hours a day rolling news channel (without time to concoct an official name) with less than 24 hours' notice and provided the listener with "access to the raw material, the events as they unfolded, from the daily military press conferences, the Presidential briefings to what it was like living in Baghdad, in Tel Aviv, with the troops in Saudi Arabia". The service was run by Jenny Abramsky and produced by volunteers, working on their days off: Brian Redhead, John Humphrys, Nick Clarke, Robin Lustig, Nicholas Witchell, Bob Simpson and Nick Ross.

Journalist Georgina Henry wrote at the time:

The continuation of Radio 4's rolling news service on the FM frequency has created friction at the BBC. Radio news and current affairs have the backing of the deputy director-general John Birt to keep it running for the duration of the war. But others see it as another example of empire-building by the expanding news and current affairs directorate. And there is concern about other Radio 4 programmes which are now only being heard on poorer-quality longwave. Michael Green, controller of Radio, is resigned to being unable to reclaim FM until September (unless war ends sooner) when it becomes Radio 4's dominant frequency. But, to reinforce the point that FM is not superseding his main service, most Radio 4 news and current affairs programmes are banned from the FM schedule.

However, many BBC radio executives and listeners were unhappy about the loss of the FM stereo service, so when the conflict ended on 2 March 1991, the rolling news service stopped. A later Henry article reported:

Internal BBC politics lies behind the decision to abruptly close Radio 4's FM news service last Saturday with so much still to report in the aftermath of the war. It appears that a move by the top brass John Birt and Michael Checkland to appease senior radio executives, less than happy with the rolling news services that took away their Radio 4 FM frequency for the duration of the war. If the frequency immediately reverted to the regular Radio 4 service, it was argued, tempers would be calmed and the way smoothed to more reasoned discussions about whether the BBC should have a permanent radio news service. Those who have become addicted hope that it will: audience research shows that it has attracted new listeners to Radio 4, although the BBC has a problem over what frequency it could allocated in the long term. It can't be FM, due to become Radio 4's main frequency in September, but longwave listening is diminishing among the BBC's target audience for such a service.

Despite this, both 29% of all stations and 68% of Radio 4 listeners heard it with an extra 1.5 million people tuning in to Radio 4 on longwave and FM frequencies.

=== Structure ===
Listeners wrote in "saying the new service was a lifeline", within the success of Radio 4 News FM convinced the BBC that a national radio rolling news network was required. However, Radio 4 listeners marched on Broadcasting House to preserve their FM and AM frequencies when it was suggested that the new service might launch on Radio 4's longwave frequency.

In The Daily Telegraph, Gillian Reynolds suggested:

Now that the BBC has created, instantly and effectively, an all-news network, would it not be a tremendous waste to un-invent it? The answer is obvious... the bold plan would be to collapse Radio 5, put its schools programmes onto a subscriber cassette service, and bring news and sport together in a new service.

And this is what the BBC ultimately did when it replaced the "improvised and disjointed" station Radio 5, which had been launched on 27 August 1990, with Radio 5 Live as "a coherent and cohesive... service of intelligent news and sport for a younger audience". The new station launched on 28 March 1994.

== Sources ==
=== Further reading ===
- "The BBC used to have a fifth network... What was its name?".
- Northrop, Kirk (11 September 2005). "From Newsreel to News 24". Archived from the original on 17 January 2007.
- Jury, Louise (8 April 2003). "Media: On the right wavelength". The Independent.
