= All Saints' Church, Crathorne =

Anglican church in North Yorkshire, England

Coordinates: 54°27′41″N 1°19′04″W

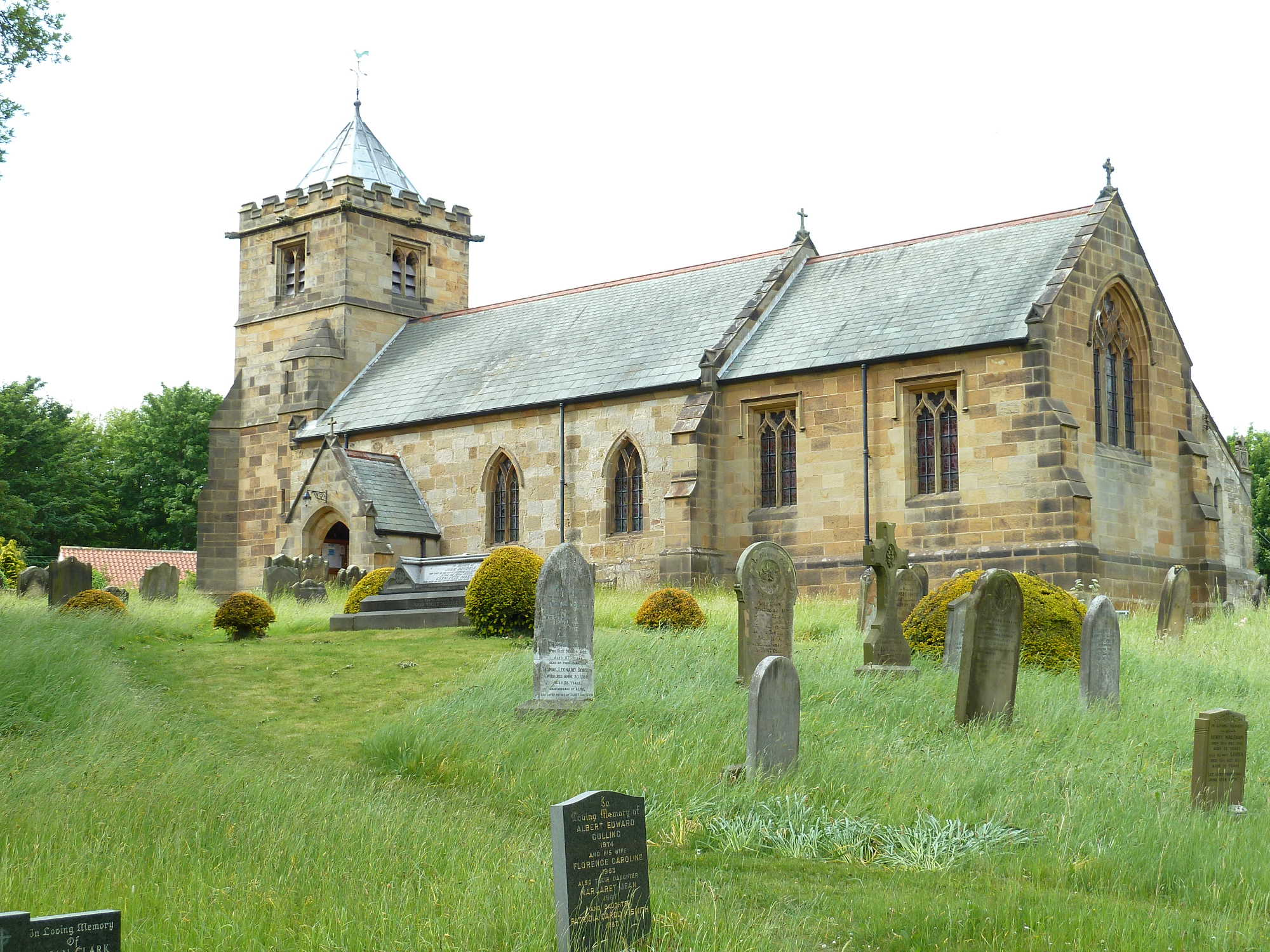
The church, in 2011

All Saints' Church is an Anglican church in Crathorne, North Yorkshire, a village in England.

There was a church on the site before the Norman Conquest, with some work done in the 12th century. It was entirely rebuilt in the 14th century, reusing some earlier fragments. The chancel was partly rebuilt and increased in height in 1844, while in 1888, the building was heavily restored by C. Hodgson Fowler, with a tower and porch added, and further work on the chancel and nave. Several Saxon stones were discovered when rebuilding the west wall, and almost all were reset into the interior walls, to display them. The building was grade II* listed in 1966.

The church is built of sandstone with Lakeland slate roofs, and consists of a nave, a chancel and a west tower. The tower has three stages, diagonal buttresses, gargoyles, an embattled parapet, and a short leaded pyramidal spire with a ball finial and a weathervane. The windows in the nave have pointed heads, those in the chancel and tower have flat heads, and the east and west windows contain Decorated tracery. Inside are two effigies, one claimed to be of William de Crathorne, who died in 1346, and one of a deacon.

== See also ==
- Grade II* listed churches in North Yorkshire (district)
- Listed buildings in Crathorne, North Yorkshire
