= Chris Morgan (journalist) =

British journalist (1952–2008)

Christopher Morgan
- Born: 29 July 1952; Cardiff, Wales
- Died: 30 May 2008 (aged 55); Kings Langley, Hertfordshire, England
- Education: Cardiff High School
- Alma mater: University of St Andrews
- Occupations: Journalist, broadcaster
- Years active: 1977–2008
- Employer(s): BBC, The Sunday Times

Christopher Morgan (29 July 1952 – 30 May 2008) was a Welsh journalist.

Morgan was born in Cardiff and educated at Cardiff High School, and the United World College of the Atlantic in the Vale of Glamorgan. He graduated in 1976 in theology from the University of St Andrews, Scotland.

Morgan began his media career in broadcasting in 1977 in the BBC's religious department. Morgan trained as a journalist from 1978 at BBC Wales, reporting for both BBC Radio Wales and BBC Radio 4, and latterly BBC1. Morgan worked for BBC Wales television, where during the early 1980s he became one of the main presenters on the evening news programme Wales Today.

After leaving BBC Wales, Morgan moved to London in 1990 to work as a reporter for Thames News and TV-am. Between 1990 and 1997, he presented Sunday for Radio 4, and became religious affairs correspondent for The Sunday Times in 1997.

A committed Anglo-Catholic, Morgan was best man at the wedding of Rowan Williams, Archbishop of Canterbury in 1981.

Having suffered from a long period of clinical depression, Morgan killed himself at Kings Langley railway station in Hertfordshire on Friday 30 May 2008. His body was found by British Transport Police, and he was pronounced dead at the scene after an incident involving a Manchester Piccadilly to London Euston train.
