= St Mary's Church, Crathorne =

Church in Crathorne, North Yorkshire, England

Coordinates: 54°27′39″N 1°19′10″W

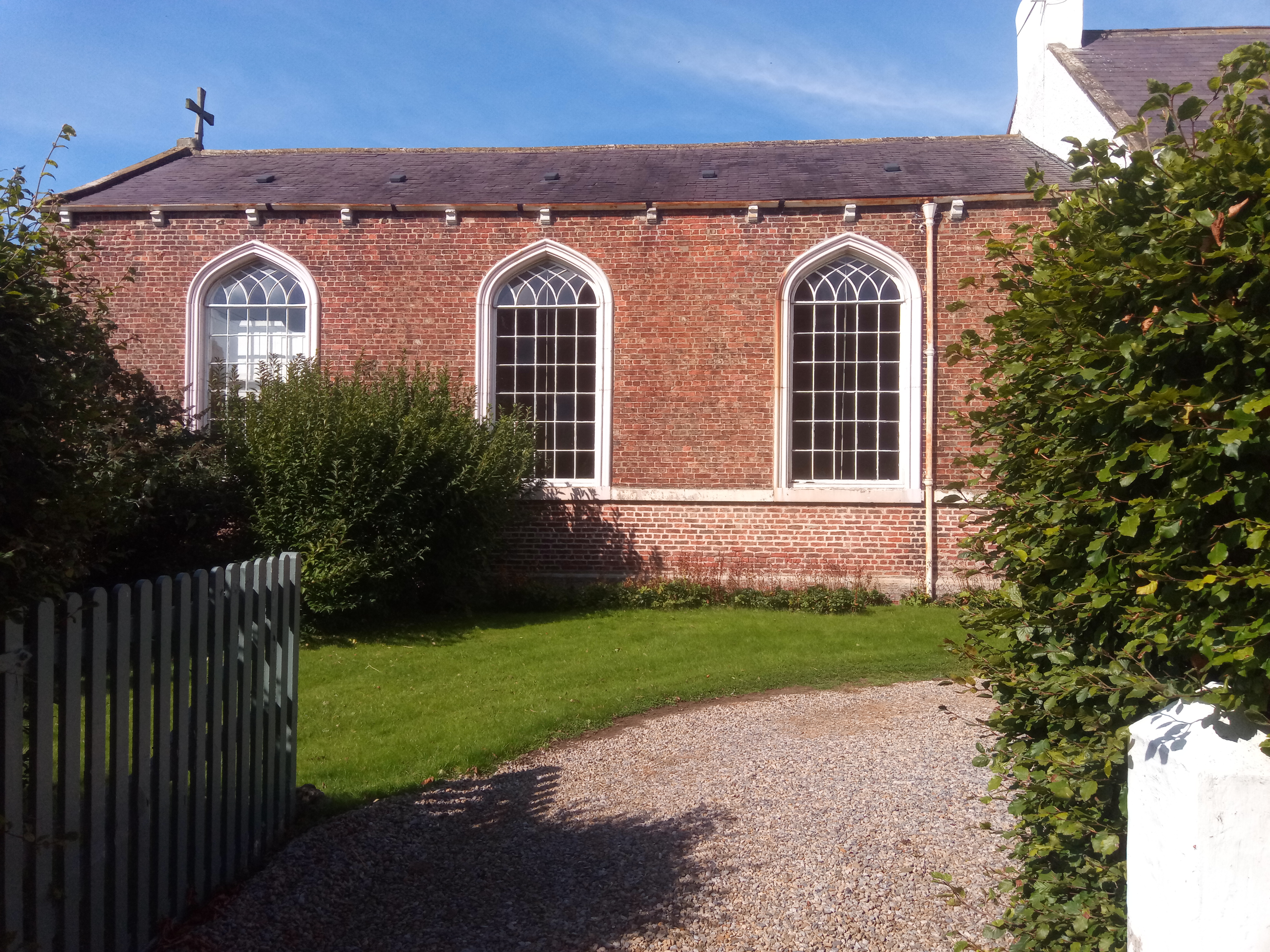
The church, in 2020

St Mary's Church is a Catholic church in Crathorne, North Yorkshire, a village in England.

Although some sources say that the church was built in 1777, a document from 1816 states that a different building was in use as the Catholic chapel at the time, having been converted from a cowhouse. The current building was constructed between 1820 and 1821, and is one of the earliest Catholic chapels in the region. A porch was added after World War II. The building is attached to the 18th-century former priest's house, which is now a private house. The building was restored in the mid-1960s, and was grade II* listed in 1966.

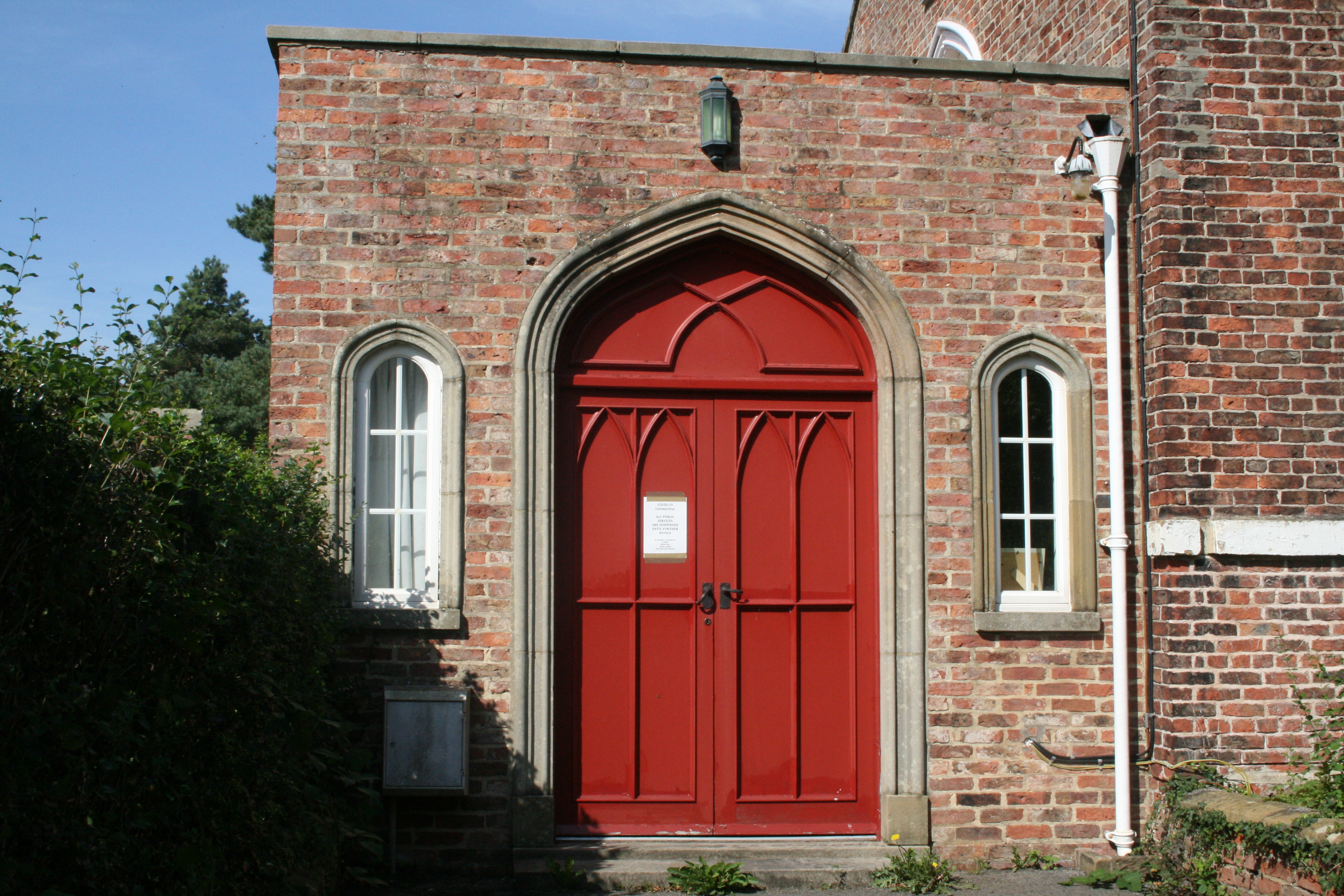
The porch

The building is constructed of light red brick, with bracketed eaves, and a Welsh slate roof with stone gable coping. There is a single storey, and along the side are three windows with a roll-moulded surrounds and Tudor arched heads, and a sill band. The porch is to the southwest. Inside the church is Gothick decoration and fittings, a gallery at the west end, and box pews. The plasterwork is particularly rich, and is believed to have originally been painted in bright colours, and to have been created by Italian craftworkers.

== See also ==
- Grade II* listed churches in North Yorkshire (district)
- Listed buildings in Crathorne, North Yorkshire
