= Everywoman (radio programme) =

BBC World Service radio programme (1997–2006)

Everywoman is a weekly radio magazine programme broadcast on the BBC World Service between March 1997 and April 2006. Billed as "for and about women", the programme covered a variety of social, political, environmental, and health issues from a woman's viewpoint. Everywoman was regularly presented by Anna Umbima, Jane Garvey, and Shyama Perera. The programme was described in The Independent as "the World Service's answer to Woman's Hour".

The song "Agolo" by Angélique Kidjo was popularised by its use as the programme's theme tune.

Everywoman was axed in October 2005 as part of a shake-up of World Service programming, and ended in April 2006. Archived episodes of the programme have since been made available on the BBC website.
