= Listed buildings in Crathorne, North Yorkshire =

Crathorne is a civil parish in the county of North Yorkshire, England. It contains 21 listed buildings that are recorded in the National Heritage List for England. Of these, three are listed at Grade II*, the middle of the three grades, and the others are at Grade II, the lowest grade. The parish contains the village of Crathorne and the surrounding countryside. Most of the listed buildings are houses, cottages and associated structures, farmhouses and farm buildings. The others include two churches, a school, and a war memorial.

== Key ==
Grade	Criteria
II*	Particularly important buildings of more than special interest
II	Buildings of national importance and special interest

== Buildings ==
Name and location	Photograph	Date	Notes	Grade
All Saints' Church; 54.46148°N 1.31772°W		14th century	The church, which incorporates earlier fragments, has been altered and extended through the centuries, with the west tower, south porch and chancel added in 1887–88 by C. Hodgson Fowler. It is built in sandstone with Lakeland slate roofs, and consists of a nave, a chancel and a west tower. The tower has three stages, diagonal buttresses, gargoyles, an embattled parapet, and a short leaded pyramidal spire with a ball finial and a weathervane. The windows in the nave have pointed heads, those in the chancel and tower have flat heads, and the east and west windows contain Decorated tracery.	II*
Old Hall Cottages; 54.46171°N 1.31796°W		17th century	The house was divided into cottages in 1935. The building is partly in stone, partly in brick, it is limewashed, and has pantile roofs with stone copings and kneelers. There are two storeys, a U-shaped plan, and main fronts of five and six bays. The windows are sashes with segmental heads, those on the east front with raised surrounds and keystones.	II
The Old School; 54.46028°N 1.31931°W	—	Late 17th or early 18th century	The building, which has been altered, has a stone base, above it is in brick, with a stepped and dentilled eaves cornice, and a pantile roof with tumbled-in brickwork on the gable ends. There are three bays, the middle bay with two storeys and the outer bays with one storey and an attic. In the centre is a round-arched opening, and in the gable end is a window with a pointed arch.	II
Corps House; 54.45430°N 1.34156°W		Early 18th century	The house is in red brick, and has a pantile roof with stone copings and kneelers. There are two storeys, two bays, and a lower two-storey single-bay extension. The windows on the front are modern casements, and at the rear is a round-arched staircase window. In the gable wall is a partly blocked round-arched loading door with pigeon holes above.	II
Outbuilding northwest of All Saints' Church; 54.46169°N 1.31840°W	—	18th century	A house later used for other purposes, in stone below, and brick above, all limewashed, with a pantile roof. There are two storeys and four irregular bays. It contains a doorway, horizontally sliding sash windows and inserted garage doors.	II
Chapel House and outbuildings 54.46095°N 1.31924°W		18th century	A former presbytery attached to St Mary's Church. It is in whitewashed pebbledash, with a Welsh slate roof, stone copings and kneelers. There are two storeys and five bays. In the centre is a Doric doorway with a patterned fanlight, and the windows are sashes in wooden architraves. To the right are single-storey outbuildings with similar windows and pantile roofs.	II
Crathorne Mill House; 54.46117°N 1.31374°W		18th century	The house, which was extended in the early 19th century, is in brick, and has pantile roofs with rendered brick copings and kneelers to the earlier part. The early part has stepped and dentilled eaves, two storeys and a double-span plan with fronts of two and three bays. The later part is lower with a single bay. The windows on the front are sashes, and at the rear are horizontally sliding sashes and a long round-arched stair window.	II
Low Foxton Farmhouse and outbuildings 54.47426°N 1.28895°W	—	18th century	The farmhouse is in brick with a tile roof and tumbled-in brickwork to the gables. There are two storeys and three wide bays. In the centre is a French door, the windows on the front are sashes in wooden architraves, and at the rear are casement windows. Attached is a U-shaped range of outbuildings in red brick with pantile roofs, consisting of stables to the left, and a barn to the right with segmental-arched openings and vents.	II
Old School Farm and Cottage; 54.46052°N 1.31918°W	—	18th century	The building is in stone to the south and brick to the north, all limewashed, with a pantile roof. There are two storeys and four bays. On the front are two doorways. Most of the windows are sashes, there is one horizontally sliding sash, and one fixed-light window.	II
Park House; 54.46509°N 1.31164°W		18th century	A wing was added to the house in the 19th century. It is in brick with a stepped eaves cornice, and a swept pantile roof with brick copings. There are two storeys and an L-shaped plan, with fronts of three bays. The windows are horizontally sliding sashes.	II
The Crathorne Arms Public House and outbuilding 54.46253°N 1.32139°W		18th century	The public house is in limewashed brick, with a stepped and dentilled brick eaves cornice, and a pantile roof with stone copings and kneelers. There are two storeys and three bays, and a later single-storey single-bay wing on the right. To the left is in single-storey outbuilding in similar style. The windows on the front are sashes, and at the rear are horizontally sliding sashes and a fixed landing window.	II
The Rectory; 54.46062°N 1.31839°W		18th century	The rectory is in red brick, with a moulded and modillioned eaves cornice, and a Welsh slate roof with stone copings and kneelers. There are two storeys, five bays and a later rear wing. In the centre is a doorway with a patterned oblong fanlight, and the windows are sashes with flat gauged brick arches and stone sills.	II
St Mary's Church; 54.46087°N 1.31943°W		1821	A Roman Catholic church in light red brick, with bracketed eaves, and a Welsh slate roof with stone gable coping. There is a single storey, and along the side are three windows with a roll-moulded surrounds and Tudor arched heads, and a sill band. To the southwest is a later porch. Inside the church is Gothick decoration and fittings, and box pews.	II*
Five Houses Farmhouse and barn wing 54.46866°N 1.31994°W		Early 19th century	The farmhouse is in rendered brick, and has a pantile roof with stone copings and kneelers. There are two storeys and three bays. The central doorway has a fanlight, and the windows are sashes. To the left is a lower two-storey barn.	II
Town End Farmhouse; 54.46004°N 1.32068°W		Early 19th century	The farmhouse is in rendered brick with a pantile roof. There are two storeys, a main range of two bays, an east wing, and a long single-storey south wing. In the main range and in the east wing are doorways, and the windows are sashes.	II
Plum Tree Cottage and cottage to south 54.46191°N 1.32100°W	—	Early to mid 19th century	A pair of cottages orné in limewashed brick, with a Welsh slate roof, long hips, and deep eaves soffit. There is a single storey, six bays, and flat-roofed side wings. Each bay contains an opening with a pointed arch, the middle two being doorways, and the outer ones sash windows. They all have interlaced glazing bars in the heads.	II
Village School; 54.46016°N 1.32170°W		1875	The school is in polychrome brick on a plinth, with stone dressings, and steeply pitched slate roofs, with sawtooth ridge pieces and overhanging eaves. There are two single-storey sections. The right section is taller, and contains two steeply gabled porches with applied timber framing, jettied over the doorways. The windows are mullioned. The lower section to the left contains a gabled dormer in the roof.	II
Crathorne Hall, piers and walls 54.46962°N 1.31373°W		1904	A country house in stone with stone slate roofs. The entrance front has two storeys under a balustrade and a recessed third storey, and five bays, flanked by towers with concave pyramidal roofs surmounted by cupolas. In the centre is a rusticated porch with an open segmental pediment. To the left is a projecting four-bay wing leading to a service block around a courtyard, with an arched carriage entrance under a pediment. The south garden front has three storeys and 15 bays, the middle three bays containing four Ionic columns, and a pediment containing an escutcheon. The forecourt walls are in stone and contain gates with square piers with griffin finials.	II*
Lodge, gate piers and wall, Crathorne Hall; 54.46608°N 1.32094°W		c. 1904	The lodge is in stone, with quoins, and a tall hipped swept stone slate roof. There is a single storey and an L-shaped plan, and the lodge contains casement windows. Flanking the entrance to the drive are square gate piers with ball finials, and outside these are walls ending in similar piers.	II
War memorial 54.46048°N 1.31960°W		c. 1919	The war memorial in the grounds of the village hall is in sandstone, and consists of a cross on a double octagonal plinth. On the base are inscriptions, and the names of those lost in the First World War.	II
Stable building, Crathorne Hall; 54.47032°N 1.31513°W	—	Early 20th century	The stable buildings are in rendered brick, with stone dressings and a hipped stone slate roof, and form four ranges round a courtyard. The main south range has a central three-storey tower containing a round-arched carriage entrance, above which are three sash windows, a clock stage, and a pyramidal roof with a domed bellcote and a weathervane. The tower is flanked by two-storey four bay wings with quoins and sash windows.	II
