= File on 4 =

Current affairs radio programme on BBC Radio 4, starting in 1977

File on 4 is a current-affairs radio programme produced by BBC News and broadcast on BBC Radio 4. First broadcast from Manchester in 1977, it is produced in Salford by the BBC's Radio Current Affairs department.

== History ==
The first programme was broadcast on Wednesday 26 October 1977 at 7.20pm.

The first presenter was Peter Oppenheimer, with reporters Steve Bradshaw and David Henshaw, from Huddersfield. Henshaw later worked for Brass Tacks on BBC2, as a producer. David Henshaw married Judy Finnigan in 1974, with twin sons in 1977, divorcing in 1986; he set up Hardcash Productions in 1992.

In the early 1980s broadcasting went from 30 to 40 minutes.

In the 1980s, broadcasting executive Helen Boaden joined the team, and became the editor in 1991. Felicity Goodey presented from 1987–1999.

== Editors ==
- 1977, Michael Green, later Controller of Radio 4 from April 1986
- Early 1980s, David Taylor
- 1988, Gerry Northam
- 1991, Helen Boaden, later Controller of Radio 4, from 2000

== Awards ==
It has won more than forty awards, including a gold Sony Radio Award in 2003.

== See also ==
- Face the Facts and Analysis
