= Crathorne, North Yorkshire =

Village and civil parish in North Yorkshire, England

Coordinates: 54°27′37″N 1°19′17″W

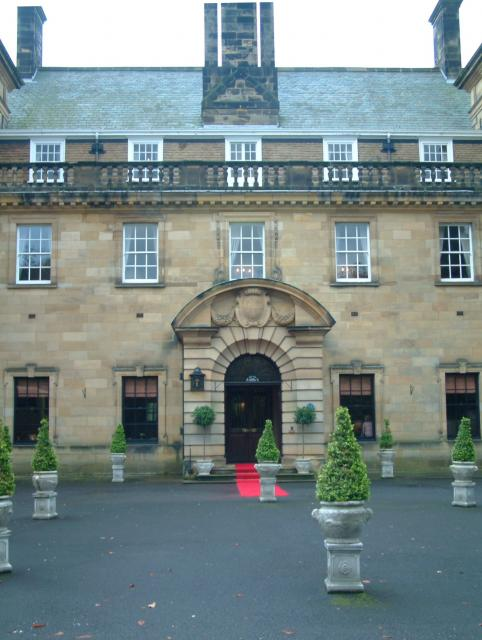
Crathorne Hall, an Edwardian stately home

Crathorne is a village and civil parish in North Yorkshire, England. The parish population was 172 at the 2011 census. The River Leven flows through the parish. The A19 used to run through the village before a dual carriageway was built in 1975. Now the A67 follows the route of the old A19 north towards Yarm.

From 1974 to 2023 it was part of the Hambleton District, it is now administered by the unitary North Yorkshire Council.

The village is the ancestral home of the Crathorne family, dating back to Sir William de Crathorne, knighted by Edward II in 1327. The village is now home to James Dugdale, 2nd Baron Crathorne, whose family purchased the Crathorne estate in 1844, and rebuilt Crathorne Hall in 1906, owning it until 1977. The hall is now a country house hotel owned by Hand Picked Hotels.

The name Crathorne derives from the Old Norse kráþorn meaning 'thorn nook of land'.

The village is home to the Anglican All Saints' Church, dating from the 14th century, and the Catholic St Mary's Church. Both are grade II* listed buildings.

The village is also home to Crathorne Cricket Club, which plays its cricket in the Langbaurgh League Second Division.

== See also ==
- Listed buildings in Crathorne, North Yorkshire
