= Isa Benzie =

British radio broadcaster

- Born: 4 December 1902; Glasgow, Scotland
- Died: 25 June 1988 (aged 85); Hastings, England
- Employer: BBC Radio
- Spouse: Royston Morley (m. 1937)
- Children: 1

Isa Donald Benzie (4 December 1902 – 25 June 1988) was a British radio broadcaster. She played a key role in the launch of Today on BBC Radio 4, and served as its first senior producer.

== Early life and education ==
Benzie was born in 1902 in Glasgow, at 1 Douglas Terrace. Her parents married 1901. She was the eldest daughter of Lt.-Col Robert Marr Benzie, of the 5th Cameronians (Scottish Rifles), the former 1st Lanarkshire Rifle Volunteers of 19 Sutherland Avenue, in Pollokshields. Her mother was Anne Lamberton.

Her father was awarded the OBE in the 1919 Birthday Honours (OBE). He was a Freemason, and died on Wednesday 8 October 1941.

She took the equivalent of a degree in German at Lady Margaret Hall in Oxford. She was not given a degree because she was a woman.

== Career ==
Benzie became a secretary at the BBC in 1927, just two years after it first had de facto national coverage in Britain. During the World War I, her father, Lt. Colonel Robert Marr Benzie, served in the same army division as John Reith who would become the managing director of the BBC, and had written to Reith asking for a position for his daughter. Isa Benzie was paid £150 per year as assistant to the head of the Foreign Liaison department, Major CF Atkinson. Benzie gathered material for talks given by Vernon Bartlett on his programme The Way of the World.

In 1932, Atkinson resigned and Benzie was given his role. Her salary increased to £500 a year but this was much less than her former boss had been paid. Benzie's career continued and her salary was increased by £100 every year with a ceiling set at £1,250 per year.

In the early 1930s, she adapted German plays into radio plays, with Barbara Burnham, by plays by Felix Gasbarra. In early October 1933 she represented the BBC at a meeting of the International Broadcasting Union in the Netherlands.

By 1933, Benzie was head of the foreign affairs department. She oversaw relationships with broadcasters worldwide, including for significant events such as the 1936 Summer Olympics and for the Coronation of George VI and Elizabeth.

In 1937 she married a BBC producer, Royston Morley. They had one child, a daughter. She had to leave the BBC because of a rule against women being married to another of their employees. Another source says that she opted to leave and her resignation meal was attended by Lord Reith.

The marital rule was relaxed during the war and Benzie returned to the BBC into the Radio Talks department, where she often organised talks on aspects of health.

In the 1940s, Benzie produced Donald Winnicott's series "The Ordinary Devoted Mother and Her Baby". Benzie and Janet Quigley "worked with Winnicott to improve his broadcasting style" and shaped the content of the programmes.

Benzie played a key role in October 1957 in the launch of Today on BBC Radio 4, which she named. She edited the programme and was its first senior producer. She took it from a programme for "people on the move" to the important step of having its own named presenter. Quigley and Benzie worked together on the programme and complemented each other's careers. They worked in the same BBC departments, had the same alma mater and witnessed each other's marriages.

== Later life, death and legacy ==
Benzie retired in 1964 and died in St Leonards in 1988.

The first and only portrait of a woman in Broadcasting House is a painting of Isa Benzie painted by Ronald Dunlop. The portrait was included in a digital project "100 Objects that made the BBC".

== See also ==
- Janet Quigley
- Today programme
- Doris Arnold
- Mary Somerville
- Elise Sprott
