= Bob Simpson (journalist) =

British journalist (1944–2006)

- Born: Robert Anthony Simpson; 29 November 1944; Woodford, Essex, England
- Died: 25 July 2006 (aged 61); London, England
- Occupation: Journalist
- Notable credit: BBC News
- Spouse(s): Clare Beaton (divorced) Juliet Bremner (m. 1996)
- Children: 2

Robert Anthony Simpson (29 November 1944 – 25 July 2006) was a British journalist who was a foreign correspondent for the BBC. Nicknamed "Mr Grumpy" by his friends and family, he reported from a number of dangerous locations across the world but was best known for his reports from Baghdad during the Gulf War.

== Early life ==
Simpson was born in Woodford, Essex. His father was a tenant farmer. He attended Brentwood School, at that time a direct-grant grammar school, where he was a contemporary of the future Labour party politician Jack Straw. He failed his A-levels and briefly took a job as a trainee banker in the City. He disliked the role and decided to leave after noting a distinct lack of entries in the diary of a senior clerk.

== Career ==
Simpson began his career working as a reporter at a newspaper in Walthamstow before moving to Robson's news agency. Simpson then moved to the BBC, working in local radio, first at Radio Brighton, where his contemporaries included Desmond Lynam, Kate Adie, Barbara Myers and Gavin Hewitt, then at Radio Sheffield. Whilst at Radio Sheffield Simpson reported on a number of serious stories including a miners' strike in early 1972. Later that year he moved to the BBC's national radio newsroom at Broadcasting House where he became a sub-editor. During his time in London he covered the exposure of Anthony Blunt as a former Soviet spy. He also reported on the ending of Radio 2's soap opera Waggoners' Walk.

The BBC then sent him to Northern Ireland to report on the Troubles, a period of time which Peter Ruff, writing in the Guardian, regarded as marking him out to his employers as "a potential "foreign fireman" correspondent". Simpson went on to report from some of the most dangerous locations in the world. He filed reports from Spain during the attempted coup d'état known as 23-F, Montevideo in Uruguay during the Falklands War, and Romania during the fall of Nicolae Ceaușescu. He would later go on to report from Sarajevo during the siege.

He was, however, probably best known for his reports from Baghdad during the Gulf War. Simpson was one of two BBC reporters to defy their editors and remain in the city whilst it was under attack by International forces. (The other was his friend and colleague John Simpson; despite having the same surname, a matter which often led to confusion among Iraqi citizens, the two are not related.) His reports were carried on the national news, the World Service, and particularly on the short lived Radio 4 News FM service. Simpson would later count the return portion of his Iraqi Airways ticket to Baghdad as a favourite souvenir quipping that one day he would try to use it. In the early days of the war, colleagues were amused by the facetious nicknames which he gave to their government minders; one he dubbed "the veritable prune", another became "the sanctimonious undertaker". Upon commencement of air raids by the Coalition, Simpson was delighted to receive a telex from his father which read, "Congratulations on being bombed by the Americans, it happened to me three times in the Second World War". He would later answer a question on a survey as to whether, in the course of his work for the BBC, he had been subjected to hazard with the words, "Yes ... Two thousand-pound penetration bomb propelled by Tomahawk missile."

Simpson believed strongly in the necessity of neutrality and the accurate reporting of facts. As he put it, "The BBC ... is not famous for thumbsucking, but coverage of what has actually happened." He disliked the idea of the journalist as celebrity, although he did respect some celebrity journalists. He was also not keen on television journalism, fearing that irrelevant points of style, such as the clothing worn by the reporter, could overwhelm the substance of the piece. The Telegraph's obituary reports him as often stating that he had "the voice for radio and the face for newspapers".

Simpson retired from journalism in 1998, although he did return to work for the BBC briefly during the Iraq War, providing expertise for the Corporation's Asian service.

== Personal life ==
Simpson married twice. He had a son, Jack, and a daughter, Kate, with his first wife. His second wife was Juliet Bremner, a television journalist 20 years his junior. They married in 1996. Simpson's nickname amongst family and friends was "Mr Grumpy".

Simpson liked motor racing and sports cars. At the time of his death he owned an MG from the early 1960s which he had recently rebuilt.
