= Janet Quigley =

British radio broadcaster

- Born: 10 May 1902; Belfast, Ireland, United Kingdom of Great Britain and Ireland
- Died: 7 February 1987 (aged 84); Oxford, England
- Occupation: BBC broadcaster
- Spouse: Kevin Fitzgerald

Janet Muriel Alexander Quigley MBE (10 May 1902 – 7 February 1987) was a British radio broadcaster associated with the Today programme and Woman's Hour.

== Early life ==
Quigley was born in Belfast in 1902, in the then United Kingdom of Great Britain and Ireland. She grew up at 48 Ulsterville Avenue in Belfast. She was educated at a school which merged with Victoria College, Belfast in 1988. Nesca Robb was three years below.

She went to college in Oxford, England, at Lady Margaret Hall.

== Career ==
Quigley joined the BBC in 1930 and she was responsible for "talks" aimed at women. She was the fourth woman in this role since the first women's talk in 1923. The first was Ella FitzGerald who continued until 1926 when Elise Sprott MBE took over. There was an overlap with Margery Wace OBE in 1930-31 and Quigley took over the role in 1936. In 1937 she was the producer of Week in Westminster.

She contacted Clemence Dane and asked her to contribute to her Sunday morning series, which she did, and later Quigley invited her on Woman's Hour. She contacted Donald Winnicott who had worked with Clare Britton, a psychiatric social worker treating children who had become evacuees. His first series of talks in 1943 was titled "Happy Children", Quigley offered him total control over the content of his talks but this soon became more consultative as Quigley advised him on the correct pitch.

=== Woman's Hour ===
The BBC flagship radio programme Woman's Hour had been created by Norman Collins and was first broadcast on 7 October 1946 on the BBC Light Programme. Despite this, Quigley has been credited with "virtually creating" the programme even though she did not become its editor until 1950.

Quigley believed that "hush-hush" subjects should be discussed openly as an example to the "less educated" to show that they were not taboo. However, memos involving Quigley show that she did lead a campaign against the popular children's author, Enid Blyton, talking on Woman's Hour despite requests to appear from her and BBC listeners since 1938. Quigley resisted requests from her own producers and asked the BBC Schools department to review her policy.

She was replaced as Editor of Woman's Hour in March 1956 by 35-year-old Miss Joanna Scott-Moncrieff (7 September 1920 - 28 December 1978), the deputy editor. Miss Scott-Moncrieff moved to religious programmes in August 1964.

=== BBC executive ===
Quigley joined BBC management in 1956 and she and Isa Benzie played a key role in the launch of Today, which was then broadcast on the BBC Home Service. Quigley also took a key role in launching the world's first national radio programme for blind people which was named In Touch.

Quigley retired from the BBC in 1962 but she continued to do work for Woman's Hour. In time, the programme broadcast twenty books that she had edited so that they could be serialised.

== Personal life ==
Quigley was given an MBE, in the 1944 New Year Honours, for her work organising talks on the radio during the war.

Quigley left the BBC in 1945 to marry Kevin Fitzgerald (19 June 1902 – 9 November 1993) who gave talks for the BBC as well as being an Irish businessman and thriller writer. He and Quigley went to live in Ireland where she became a step mother to her husband's daughter.

Quigley died at Oxford's John Radcliffe Hospital in 1987. She was survived by her husband.
