= Crathorne Hall =

Hotel in North Yorkshire, England

Coordinates: 54.4695°N 1.3135°W

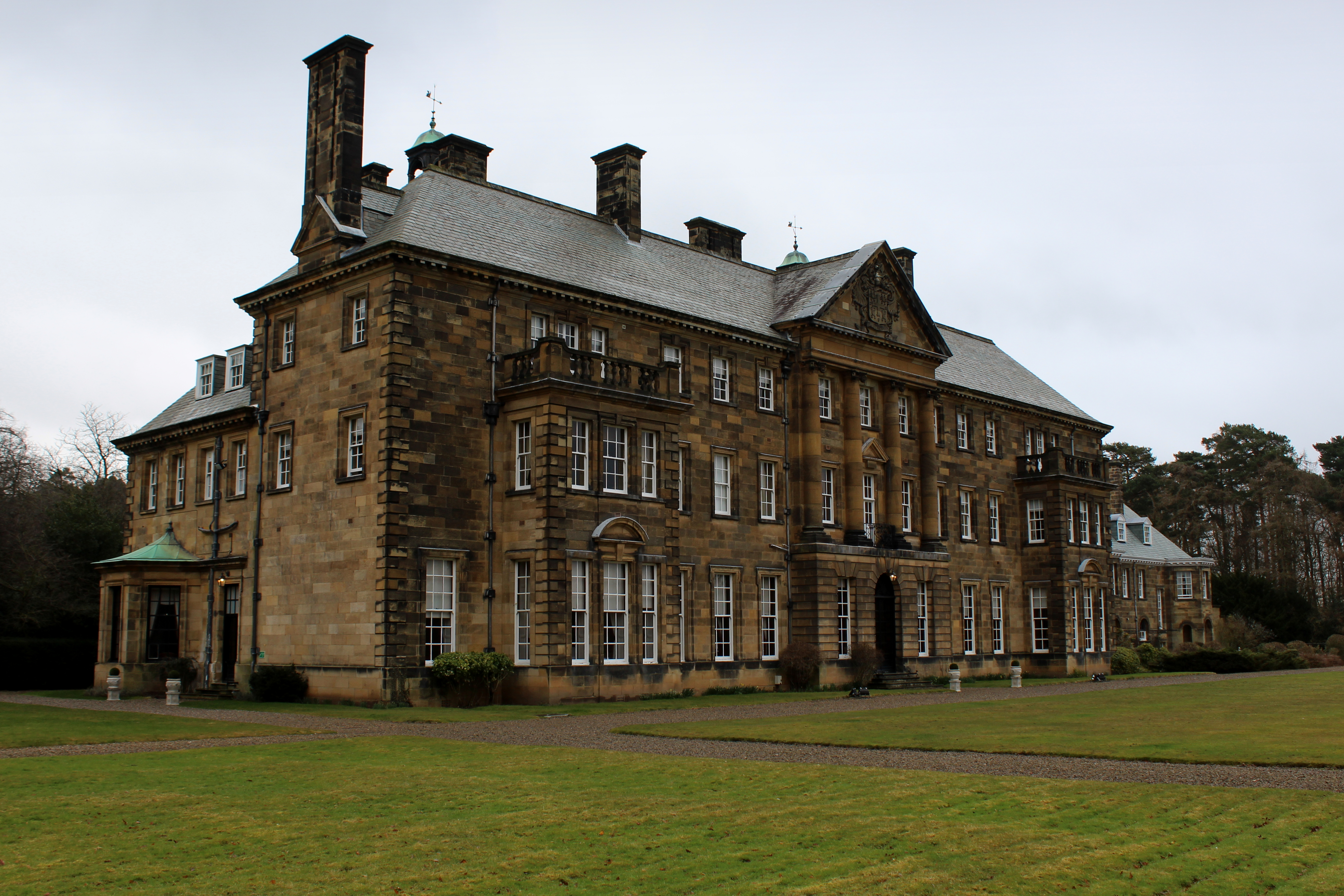
The building, in 2018

Crathorne Hall is a historic building in Crathorne, North Yorkshire, a village in England.

The Crathorne family first built a manor house in the village in the 14th century, but by 1808 had reconstructed it as a plan and modern building. In the early 20th century, it was converted into cottages. In 1904, J. L. Dugdale built a new hall, on a different site. The Dugdale family hosted guests including Harold Macmillan, Queen Elizabeth the Queen Mother and John Cleese, before selling the property in 1977. The building was grade II* listed in 1982. In 2004, it suffered a fire which destroyed much of the east wing, but it was repaired at a cost of £4 million and reopened the following year.

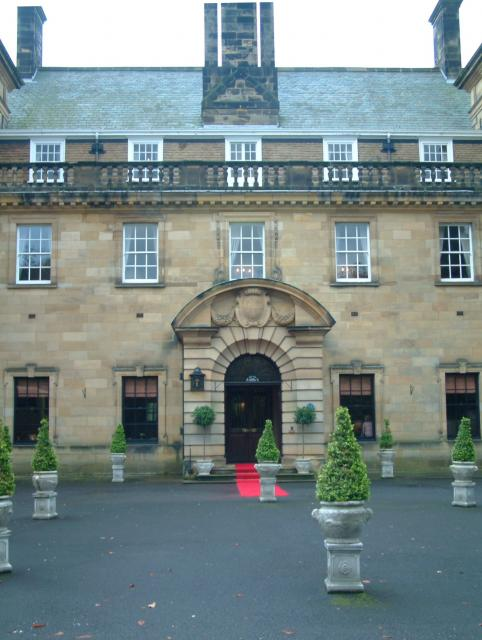
Main entrance

The country house in built of stone, with stone slate roofs. The entrance front has two storeys under a balustrade and a recessed third storey, and five bays, flanked by towers with concave pyramidal roofs surmounted by cupolas. In the centre is a rusticated porch with an open segmental pediment. To the left is a projecting four-bay wing leading to a service block around a courtyard, with an arched carriage entrance under a pediment. The south garden front has three storeys and 15 bays, the middle three bays containing four Ionic columns, and a pediment containing an escutcheon. The forecourt walls are in stone and contain gates with square piers with griffin finials.

== See also ==
- Grade II* listed buildings in North Yorkshire (district)
- Listed buildings in Crathorne, North Yorkshire
