= BBC Caribbean Service =

BBC World Service news programmes

The BBC Caribbean Service was BBC World Service's successor to Caribbean Voices. It was launched as a weekday news service to the Caribbean in 1988 and closed on March 25, 2011. It became a key source of news and information for the region. The original production team was made up of four journalists/producers based at Bush House in London: Launch editor Jerry Timmins, producer Hugh Crosskill, who later became head of the service, producer Pat Whitehorne and production assistant Helen MacKessey.

The service was relayed by FM stations across the Caribbean and broadcast on short wave and medium wave to over one million weekly listeners. Its audio output from 1988 to 2011 is archived by the University of the West Indies and is widely recognised as a source of cultural and political history.

Over the years, the BBC hosted some the Caribbean's best journalists and writers from the poet Sam Selvon to Trinidadian journalists Ricky Singh and Trevor MacDonald. Their contributions were acknowledged by the Service's last editor Debbie Ransome. BBC World Service's first specialist output to the Caribbean was Calling the West Indies which broadcast from 1943 until its closure in 1975. Caribbean Voices was part of that service. From 1975 until 1988, the only regional BBC link with the Caribbean was BBC Caribbean Magazine, presented by Annemarie Grey. This was originally a taped, weekly cultural programme sent to FM stations across the region. It was produced by the Topical Tapes department at BBC World Service. The Head of Department was Genevieve Eckenstein, who was a long-time champion of Caribbean writers and the BBC's connection to the region. Caribbean Magazine was incorporated in to the Caribbean Service in 1988 and came to an end with the closure of the Service in 2011.
