= Brian Redhead =

British journalist and broadcaster

- Brian Redhead pictured on the cover of Personal Perspectives
- Born: Brian Leonard Redhead; 28 December 1929; Newcastle upon Tyne, England
- Died: 23 January 1994 (aged 64); Macclesfield, Cheshire, England
- Education: Royal Grammar School, Newcastle
- Alma mater: University of Cambridge (BA)
- Occupations: Author; journalist; broadcaster
- Spouse: Jean Salmon (m. 1954)
- Children: 4

Brian Leonard Redhead (28 December 1929 – 23 January 1994) was a British author, journalist and broadcaster. He was a co-presenter of the Today programme on BBC Radio 4 from 1975 until 1993, shortly before his death. Although a native of Newcastle-upon-Tyne, he was a great lover and promoter of the city of Manchester and the North West in general, where he lived for most of his career.

== Education and early life ==
Redhead was born in Newcastle upon Tyne. He was the only child of (Ernest) Leonard Redhead, a silk screen printer and advertising agent, and his wife, Janet Crossley (née Fairley). He was educated at the Royal Grammar School, Newcastle. After national service, he read history at the University of Cambridge as an undergraduate student of Downing College, Cambridge.

== Career ==
Redhead's career in journalism started in 1954 as a journalist for the Manchester Guardian newspaper. He married Jean Salmon (known as Jenni) on 19 June 1954. They had four children: two sons, Stephen and James, and twins, Annabel (known as Abby) and William.

He became northern editor of The Guardian in 1965, and editor of the Manchester Evening News in 1969. After being passed over for the editorship of The Guardian in favour of Peter Preston in 1975, he left to join the Today programme on BBC Radio 4, replacing Robert Robinson. He was already an experienced broadcaster, having been 'discovered' around 1960 by a BBC Manchester producer, Olive Shapley, who was looking for a presenter of a television programme called Something to Read:

I held auditions over two days and there were some promising people. However, on the second day a young man turned up who was clearly highly intelligent and knowledgable [sic], oozed confidence, communicated effortlessly through the camera, was very funny and never stopped talking. I knew instantly that this was the one.

Later, Redhead presented Points North on television, and chaired the Saturday night Radio 4 topical conversation programme A Word in Edgeways for many years.

In the 1970s Redhead appeared twice on BBC Two's music panel quiz Face the Music: on 10 June 1974 and on 24 September 1975.

He formed a partnership with fellow Today presenter John Timpson which lasted for over 10 years. Redhead and Timpson had a series of running jokes on the programme, including the mythical organisations "The Friends of the M6" (long-suffering motorists trapped in its frequent traffic jams) and "The League of Pear-Shaped Men" (of which he and Timpson were the principal members).

His sense of humour often appeared in asides in the Today programme. Talking of a convoy moving at 3 mph, Redhead observed that was probably 3 mph faster than they were moving on the M25 motorway that morning. When working the same slot as John Humphrys, he gleefully reported that Humphrys had turned up for work on his day off (probably before 6.00am) and was livid. On another occasion, he reported that the weather would be "brighter in the north than the south, like the people". Sue MacGregor and Peter Hobday were also co-presenters, and the team was celebrated in 1987.

During his time on the Today programme, Redhead was accused of political bias by Conservative Chancellor Nigel Lawson, and in reply enquired "Do you think we should have a one-minute silence now in this interview, one for you to apologise for daring to suggest that you know how I vote and secondly perhaps in memory of monetarism which you have now discarded?" He later had a similar set-to with Trade and Industry Secretary Peter Lilley.

The feeling was that Redhead was to the left of his co-presenter John Timpson. Many years later Libby Purves, who also presented Today at the time, characterised them as classic opposites – Redhead the self-made Northerner, with social democratic leanings and aspirations to better himself, Timpson the gentle (and, perhaps, gently declining in terms of social prestige) old-school conservative middle class Southerner. In her words, Timpson "wanted it to be 1950", while Redhead "was more than ready for the New Britain of the 21st century, although he died before seeing its birth". However, Redhead claimed to be more of a Tory wet, not a socialist, and stated that he had cast a personal vote for Macclesfield's Conservative MP, Nicholas Winterton.

The death of Redhead's youngest son, William, in a car crash in France in 1982, aged 18, led him to rediscover religious faith, and he became a confirmed member of the Church of England a few months later. In the Radio 4 series The Good Book, he charted the history of the Bible.

In the last years of his life, there was some speculation that after his retirement from Today he would train for ordination as an Anglican priest. He was also a strong supporter of the hospice movement, ambiguously calling it "the best thing that has happened in this country since the Second World War". He served as Chancellor of the University of Manchester from August 1st 1993 until his death the following January.

During the First Gulf War in 1991, he was a volunteer presenter on the BBC Radio 4 News FM service.

=== Publications ===
During his career he published the following books:

- The Bedside Guardian 10: A Selection from the Guardian 1960-1961
- The Good Book: An introduction to the Bible
- The Anti-Booklist
- A Love of the Lakes
- The National Parks of England Wales.
- Plato to NATO: Studies on political thought
- Personal Perspectives.
- Manchester – a Celebration
- North West of England. BBC Books. 1994

== Personal life ==
Redhead married Jean (Jenni) Salmon in 1954 and had four children.

In 1993, his health started to fail and he was in pain on his left side and leg. He was thought to need hip surgery, but in fact had a ruptured appendix which was leaking toxins, causing liver and kidney failure and other problems. He took leave from Today in early December, expecting to return after Christmas, but died in January 1994.

Media offices
Preceded by Robert Robinson	Presenter of Today Programme; 1975–1993	Succeeded by James Naughtie
