= Julian Holland (author) =

English author & artist (born 1946)

- Born: Julian Angus Holland; 1946 (age 79–80)
- Occupations: Author, artist

Julian Angus Holland (born 1946) is an English author and artist.

He grew up in Gloucester, England and fell in love with the railways at a young age. He regularly enjoyed trainspotting.

Upon leaving school, Holland trained as a graphic designer at Hornsey College of Art. He worked as a designer and an art director for a number of London-based publishing houses. He is a prolific author of works on railways and railway history, as well as on the smaller islands of the British Isles.

== Select bibliography ==
- The mysterious universe (c1979)
- Water under the bridge (1998)
- The concise history encyclopedia (1999)
- Lands of the Southern Cross (c1971)
- Amazing & Extraordinary Railway Facts (David & Charles, 2008)
- Discovering Britain's Little Trains (AA Publishing, 2008)
- Great Railways of the World (AA Publishing, 2008)
- The Lost Joy of Railways (David & Charles, 2009)
- Discovering Scotland's Lost Railways (Waverley Books, 2009)
- More Amazing & Extraordinary Railway Facts (David & Charles, 2010)
- Discovering Scotland's Lost Local Lines (Waverley Books, 2010)
- The Lost Lines of Britain (AA Publishing, 2010)
- Steaming Across Britain (AA Publishing, 2011)
- Amazing & Extraordinary Facts: Trains & Railways (David & Charles, 2011)
- Mapping the Railways; with David Spaven (Times Books, 2011)
- Railway Days Out (AA Publishing, 2012)
- Amazing & Extraordinary Facts: Steam Age (David & Charles, 2012)
- Britain's Scenic Railways (Times Books, 2012)
- Dr Beeching: 50 Years On (David & Charles, 2013)
- An A-Z of Famous Express Trains (David & Charles, 2013)
- Exploring Britain's Lost Railways (Times Books, 2013)
- Railway Day Trips (Collins, 2014)
- Great Railway Journeys of the World (Times Books, 2014)
- History of Britain's Railways (Times Books, 2015)
- Amazing & Extraordinary Facts: Railways (Rydon Publishing, 2015)
- Lost Railway Walks (Collins, 2016)
- All Aboard (The Times) (HarperCollins, 2021)
