= Woman's Hour =

British radio magazine programme (est. 1946)

- Genre: News magazine focusing on women's issues
- Running time: 60 minutes (10:00 am – 11:00 am)
- Country of origin: United Kingdom
- Language: English
- Home station: BBC Light Programme (1946–1967); BBC Radio 2 (1967–1973); BBC Radio 4 (1973–present)
- Hosted by: Anita Rani (2021–); Nuala McGovern (2024–)
- Created by: Norman Collins; Janet Quigley
- Recording studio: Broadcasting House, London, UK, dock10 studios
- Original release: 7 October 1946; 79 years ago
- Audio format: Stereo
- Website: www.bbc.co.uk/programmes/b007qlvb
- Podcast: www.bbc.co.uk/programmes/b007qlvb/episodes/downloads

Woman's Hour is a radio magazine programme broadcast on BBC Radio 4. It has been on the air since 1946, and has been broadcast on BBC Radio 4 since 1973. The programme features interviews and discussions with guests about issues relevant to a female audience. It is broadcast at 10:00 am on weekdays and is presented by Nuala McGovern or Anita Rani. There is also a weekend version of the programme which features highlights from the week's programmes.

== History ==
=== Earlier incarnations ===
The first BBC programme for women was the programme called Women's Hour, which was first broadcast on 2 May 1923. The BBC was then a brand new organisation, just a few months old, grappling with the sorts of programmes that might appeal to its small but growing audience. With married women firmly based in the home, either through convention or because of marriage bars, the BBC would have been aware of this captive daytime audience. The person brought in to oversee Women's Hour was Mrs Ella Fitzgerald, a former Fleet Street journalist, and the inaugural programme included two talks, one on "The Adoption of Babies" given by Princess Alice, Countess of Athlone, the other on "Fashions" by the couturier, Lady Duff Gordon.

Broadcast six days a week, initially at 5pm, Women's Hour encompassed topics such as cookery, infant welfare, poultry keeping, tennis, beauty culture, electricity in the home, society gossip and gardening. In many ways, it replicated the sorts of items that were then found in the women's pages of newspapers and Ella Fitzgerald often drew on her journalist friends to write and present talks. So, for example, regular "Kitchen Conversations" were given by the famous cookery writer Constance Peel while Edith Shackleton Heald spoke about journalism as a potential career for women. There was also space for political talks: the former suffragist, Mary Emmott, who sat on a number of local government committees, spoke on "How Local Government affects the Home", Alderman Miss Smee, who chaired Acton Council's Public Health Committee gave a talk on "Women and Public Health" and Lettice Fisher, the founder of the National Council for the Unmarried Mother and her Child, talked about "Education".

The talks were broadcast from the BBC's first purpose-built studio at Savoy Hill, just off The Strand in London, where the organisation was based for its first ten years. It would have been quite a daunting process. Speakers would have waited outside the large curtain-draped space, clutching their scripts. When the time came to deliver their talk, they would then have stood before a large box-like structure – the microphone – where they would have been given a cue to start. It was then just a matter of continuing on until finished, hopeful that they hadn't spoken too slowly or too fast or made too many mistakes. In the absence of any recordings, it's not possible to know what these talks would have sounded like, but reception on rudimentary wireless sets would have been very poor. It's also impossible to know who would have been tuning-in to the programme in these very early days, but most probably they were the wives and mothers of radio enthusiasts who, evidence suggests, were overwhelmingly male.

Things would change for Women's Hour in December 1923, with the establishment of a Women's Advisory Committee to oversee the running of the programme. Amongst the prestigious membership were the Chairman of the National Federation of Women's Institutes, Lady Denman; the actress Dorothea Baird; the physician Elizabeth Sloan Chesser and Violet Cambridge, the Secretary of the Women's Amateur Athletics Association. The first full meeting, in January 1924, raised questions about the sorts of talks that should be included in Women's Hour and also the time of day that it was broadcast. It was decided that two members of the Committee, Mrs Hardman Earle (who had worked for the Ministry of Food and Public Kitchens during the First World War) and Evelyn Gates (who was Editor-in-Chief of The Women's Yearbook) should appear on the following Saturday's programme to canvas listener views. The case for practical domestic talks was put forward by Hardman Earle while Evelyn Gates championed the case for lighter, escapist talks and listeners were also asked about when they could best tune-in.

The results of the 'plebiscite', as it was termed, were discussed at the February meeting of the Women's Advisory Committee. With the majority of the letters received (326 in all) voting for leisure rather than domestic talks, it was agreed that these should feature more prominently in the programme, which would be moved to a new time of 4pm. Writing about the change in the BBC listings periodical Radio Times, Ella Fitzgerald explained how "a tour of Constantinople" was substituted for "the cure of constipation" while "talks on the English countryside" replaced those about "stocking the kitchen cupboard". The decision was also taken at the meeting to abolish the name Women's Hour; in future Radio Times would simply state that "talks of general interest but with particular appeal to women" would be placed either side of the afternoon concert.

=== Formation ===
Created by Norman Collins and originally presented by Alan Ivimey, Woman's Hour was first broadcast on 7 October 1946 on the BBC Light Programme. Janet Quigley, who was also involved with the birth of the UK radio programme Today, has been credited with "virtually creating" the programme.

The broadcast time had a high-profile move from afternoon to mid-morning in September 1991.

=== Presenters ===
The programme was transferred to its current home in 1973. Over the years it has been presented by Mary Hill (1946–1963), Joan Griffiths (1947–1949), Olive Shapley (1949–1953), Jean Metcalfe (1950–1968), Violet Carson (1952–1956), Marjorie Anderson (1958–1972), Teresa McGonagle (1958–1976), Judith Chalmers (1966–1970), Sue MacGregor (1972–1987), Jenni Murray (1987–2020), Martha Kearney (1998 to March 2007), and Jane Garvey (8 October 2007 to December 2020). Fill-in presenters have included Andrea Catherwood, Sangita Myska, Sheila McClennon, Carolyn Quinn, Jane Little, Ritula Shah, Oona King, and Amanda Platell. In September 2020 it was announced that Emma Barnett would become the lead presenter of Woman's Hour after the retirement of Jenni Murray, who presented her final edition on 1 October 2020. Barnett, who had been a fill-in presenter a number of times previously, became the youngest woman to regularly present the programme in January 2021. Anita Rani became the successor to Garvey as the second presenter in the same month.

=== Greater depth of topics ===
In the early years the topics for the programme were arranged well in advance and printed in the Radio Times but by the 1980s there was a change to greater topicality. Clare Selerie-Gray became the producer in 1987 and steered the programme away from its tendency to include merely whimsical topics and ensured that the books read in the last section were more relevant to women's lives rather than ordinary novels. She responded to criticism that the programme was too feminist by asserting that it avoided "Spare Rib didactics" but that a feminist influence on the people who made it had occurred.

On 31 December 2004, the show became Man's Hour for one day only, on which it was presented by Channel 4 News anchor Jon Snow. On 18 July 2010, after 64 years of Woman's Hour, the BBC began broadcasting a full series called Men's Hour on BBC Radio 5 Live, presented by Tim Samuels.

In 2006, Woman's Hour had 2.7 million listeners.

For one week in April 2014, the programme was guest edited by J. K. Rowling, Kelly Holmes, Naomi Alderman, Doreen Lawrence and Lauren Laverne. It was the first time the programme had a guest editor since its initial decade of broadcast. In September 2015, the programme hosted "Woman's Hour Takeover" with a week of guest editors, including Kim Cattrall, Nimko Ali, Rachel Treweek, Michelle Mone and Jacqueline Wilson.

Late Night Woman's Hour, a spinoff series, was launched in 2015, presented by Lauren Laverne. The series is broadcast in an 11 pm timeslot and each episode takes a single topic for discussion. The lateness of the broadcast allows for more freedom to handle topics considered unsuitable for the morning broadcast.

The programme has an annual "power list" of highly achieving women. The annual power list is determined by a panel of judges.

On 18 March 2011, Woman's Hour was the first live broadcast from the new dock10 studios at Media City in Salford.

In 2013, the programme had 3.9 million listeners, 14% of whom were men. In October 2016, it was recorded that the programme had 3.7 million listeners weekly and was the second most popular daily podcast across BBC Radio. A quarter of its audience were reported to be under 35 and 40% male.

== Format ==
The bulk of the programme has always consisted of reports, interviews and debates on health, education, cultural and political topics aimed at women and mothers. However, until 2021 these occupied only the first 45 minutes of the hour. The final 15 minutes consisted of more lightweight entertainment, usually fiction, still broadly directed at women. Prior to 1998, this slot featured readings. From 1998 to 2021 it featured short-run drama serials, known initially as Woman's Hour Drama and later as 15 Minute Drama. One of the most popular of these was the recurring Ladies of Letters serial, starring Prunella Scales and Patricia Routledge. The drama slot was dropped in 2021, since when the full hour of Woman's Hour has been given over to reports and interviews etc.

The always very specific subject for listeners' text, email, social media or WhatsApp messages to the programme is revealed at the start of the programme by the presenter. Listeners' messages are read out during the programme.

== Schedule ==
Woman's Hour has been broadcast at 10 am Monday to Friday since James Boyle's revision of the Radio 4 schedules in April 1998.

=== Move from afternoon to mid-morning ===
In late November 1990, Michael Green, controller of Radio 4, announced that it would be moved to 10:30 am, from 16 September 1991. The content and presenters would stay the same, but the programme title would possibly change. Radio 4 had most listeners in the morning, around 2m, but by mid-morning, this decreased. Documentaries broadcast at this time were too heavyweight, for that time of day, with listeners wanting something lighter in content. During the day, at 2 pm, the number of television viewers overtake the number of radio listeners.

To make way for the move to 10:30 am, Michael Green cancelled the 'Morning Story', of which six or seven a year were written by listeners. Duncan Minshull, editor of short stories, received around 120 short stories a week in the post, with around 40% from women. The 'Afternoon Play' would be moved from 3pm to 2pm. 'Short Story' would be broadcast later in the afternoon, but no listeners would contribute to the content.

Between September 1991 and April 1998 it was broadcast at 10:30 am, having previously gone out for many years in an early afternoon slot (2 pm). The programme's move to a morning slot was unpopular among some listeners who, for family or other reasons, work only in the morning.

=== Weekends ===
Weekend Woman's Hour is broadcast on Saturday afternoons at 4 pm, features highlights of the previous week introduced by one of the presenters and lasts almost an hour. Additionally, episodes are made available as a podcast following the broadcast of each programme.

== Music ==
In its earlier years, it used a variety of popular light classics as signature tunes, including such pieces as H. Elliott-Smith's Wanderlust (Waltz), Anthony Collins' Vanity Fair, and the lively Overture from Gabriel Fauré's Masques et bergamasques. From the early 1970s, specially composed pieces were used, several of which were provided by the BBC Radiophonic Workshop.

There is also a band called Woman's Hour, based in the UK and signed to the record label Secretly Canadian, who took their name from the radio show.

== Controversies ==
=== Breach of BBC impartiality rules ===
A listener complained about the 1 October 2018, edition of Woman's Hour, which featured an item discussing the nomination of Judge Brett Kavanaugh to the US Supreme Court. The feature included an interview with a law professor who had worked with Anita Hill, in her pursuit of a sexual harassment complaint against an earlier nominee, Judge Clarence Thomas. The listener believed that allusions to the earlier case were immaterial and prejudicial, that the selection of interviewee was biased, and that presenter Jane Garvey had expressed her personal view on a controversial topic.

The BBC Executive Complaints Unit partially upheld the listener's complaint, stating that Garvey gave the impression of sympathising with the interviewee's viewpoint, and "did not challenge the interviewee in a manner which would have ensured due impartiality". As a result, the Woman's Hour team and production staff attended a briefing on impartiality.

=== Sinead O'Connor ===
In 2021 Emma Barnett interviewed Sinéad O'Connor on Woman's Hour, during which Barnett mentioned a recent comment by a music critic referring to O'Connor as "the crazy woman in pop's attic". O'Connor felt that bringing this up was "unnecessary and hurtful". The interview prompted O'Connor to announce she was quitting music, though she later retracted this, stating that Barnett had been to blame:

== Feminism ==
Former Woman's Hour presenter Jenni Murray is president of the Fawcett Society and a former patron of the charity Women's Aid.

In April 2014, Radio 4's Roger Bolton noted on the BBC's Feedback Blog: "As you well know BBC programmes are supposed to be impartial but I'm not sure if that can be said of Woman's Hour, at least when it comes to feminism. Woman's Hour is in fact a powerful advocate for women's empowerment and this week as part of that campaign it produced its second power list."

== Awards and nominations ==
Year	Association	Category	Nominee(s)	Result
2017	Diversity in Media Awards	Radio Programme of the Year	BBC Woman's Hour	Nominated

== See also ==
- Late Night Woman's Hour
- Woman's Hour Drama
