= Michael Green (radio) =

British BBC Radio producer

- Partner: Christine Green

Michael Green is a British BBC Radio producer who created File on 4 then became Controller of BBC Radio 4. He is married with two children.

== Early life ==
Michael Green came from Barnsley.

After graduating in 1964 Michael Green became a journalist with a freelance agency in Fleet Street, then joined the international service of Swiss broadcasting in Berne. He then had a traineeship with United Newspapers in Sheffield, before becoming a producer at BBC Radio Sheffield at its launch in 1967.

== BBC career ==
In 1970 Michael Green became a 'Talks Producer' in Manchester, working on A Word in Edgeways with Brian Redhead and From the Grass Roots with George Scott. In the mid seventies he joined Analysis and in 1977 conceived and created File on 4. He became manager for BBC Radio in Manchester as network editor for Northern Region, then was appointed Controller of BBC Radio 4 in 1986. In 1996 he left the BBC to become a freelance media consultant.
