= Gerry Northam =

British radio presenter and journalist

- Born: Gerald Douglas Edward Northam; 28 June 1947 (age 79); Hatfield, Hertfordshire, England
- Education: Keele University
- Occupations: Radio presenter, Journalist
- Years active: 1971–present
- Known for: Panorama

Gerald Douglas Edward "Gerry" Northam (born 28 June 1947) is a British BBC Radio presenter and investigative journalist.

== Early life ==
He was born in Hatfield, Hertfordshire. He grew up in Cricklewood and Edgware, which were then in Middlesex. He studied Philosophy and Physics at Keele University in 1966, graduating in 1970.

== Career ==
He started as a news reporter for BBC Radio Stoke, later joining educational television.

=== Panorama ===
He learnt his investigative journalist skills on the flagship BBC programme Panorama.

=== Radio 4 ===
He presents File on 4. File on 4 can be represented as a radio version of Panorama. His knowledge of science and arts from university has allowed him to cover many types of subject.

He has won a Sony Award and two Royal Television Society (RTS) awards.

== Personal life ==
He married in Newcastle-under-Lyme in 1976. then in Manchester in 1984. He is a beekeeper.
