= London Calling (magazine) =

- Coronation of Queen Elizabeth II issue
- Categories: Listings magazine
- Frequency: Monthly
- Final issue: December 2004
- Company: BBC World Service
- Country: United Kingdom
- Based in: London
- Language: English
- OCLC: 4652734

London Calling (later renamed BBC Worldwide, then BBC On Air) is a former monthly magazine that contained programme listings for the BBC World Service shortwave radio broadcasting service. Originally called the Empire Programme Pamphlet (for what was then known as the BBC Empire Service) and then BBC Empire Broadcasting, the title was changed to London Calling in mid-1939 when the magazine expanded from 12 pages to 16. The title alludes to the BBC World Service's station identification: "This is London calling ...", which was used during World War II, often in broadcasts to occupied countries.

== Background ==
In November 1993, the magazine was replaced with a 100-page colour magazine (up until then, the magazine was printed in two colours except for the front and back covers) and started including more and deeper stories, and renamed BBC Worldwide (from April to November 1995, there was a North American edition, subtitled BBC Worldwide North America, presumably so the magazine could be sent to North American subscribers and appear on shelves in North American stores without the cost of having to send the issues air mail from the UK each month). However, rising costs, which forced the BBC to reduce the size of the paper it used at one point, caused the magazine to change back to a mainly-listings format, and the title was changed to BBC On Air (later stylised BBC on|air), although the longer stories would make their way back into the magazine over the years.

The last edition of BBC On Air was that of December 2004. In a letter sent to subscribers the managing director of the magazine cited as reason for the discontinuation "that many of our listeners are getting programme information on line and that it is no longer cost-effective to produce the printed edition of the magazine."
