= Jane Garvey (broadcaster) =

British radio presenter

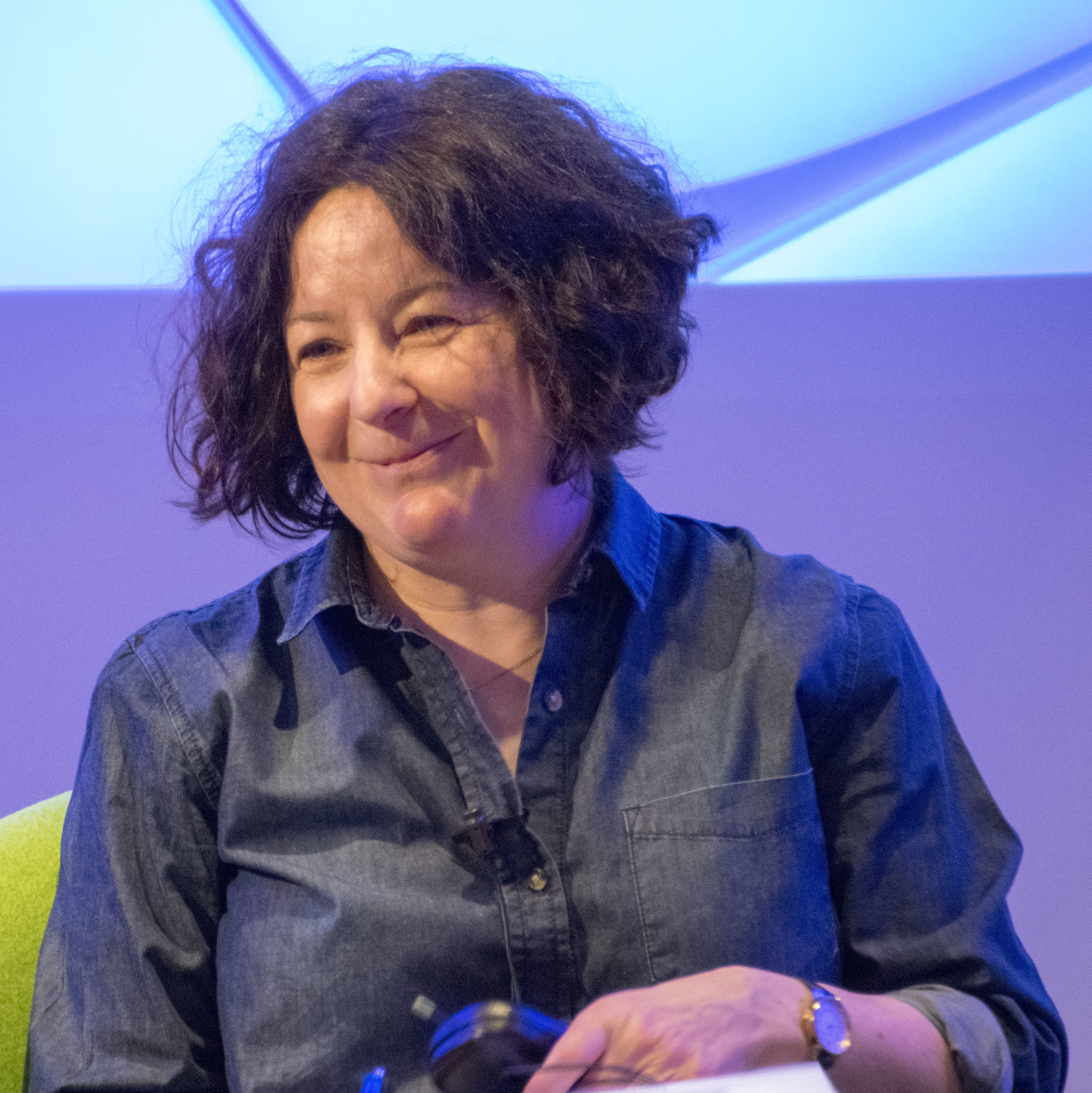
- Garvey in 2018
- Born: 23 June 1964 (age 62); Crosby, England
- Occupation: Broadcaster
- Employer: BBC
- Spouse: Adrian Chiles (m. 1998; div. 2009)
- Children: 2

Jane Susan Garvey (born 23 June 1964) is a British radio presenter, until 31 December 2010 she presented BBC Radio 4's Woman's Hour. She co-founded the weekly podcast series Fortunately (from March 2017 to November 2022). Since October 2022 she has hosted a Times Radio show and the "Off Air" podcast with Fi Glover.

Garvey's was the first voice on BBC Radio 5 Live when it launched at 5:00 am on 28 March 1994. She presented the station's breakfast programme and the relaunched Midday show, and co-presented its Drive show on weekday afternoons with Peter Allen, for which she and Allen won four Sony Gold Awards.

== Early life and education ==
Garvey was born in Crosby, near Liverpool, in 1964. Her father is Ray Garvey, and her mother, Maureen (born O'Neill), was a hospital receptionist. She was educated at Merchant Taylors' Girls' School in Crosby, a private school in Merseyside. She is a graduate in English of the University of Birmingham.

== Career ==
Garvey was employed as a medical records clerk in a finance company, as a trainee for an advertising agency and as a receptionist before becoming a promotions assistant for Radio Wyvern, where she later became news editor, leaving in 1988 to join BBC Hereford and Worcester as a reporter. The station began in February 1989. In that year, Garvey was presenter of The Breakfast Show at BBC Hereford and Worcester, where Ben Cooper worked as her assistant.

Garvey's was the first voice on BBC Radio 5 Live when it launched at 5:00 am on 28 March 1994. She became the co-presenter of 5 Live's award-winning breakfast programme in 1994, and also presented the Everywoman programme on the BBC World Service. She was also the presenter of the relaunched Midday show on BBC Radio 5 Live (during which the award-winning Postcards from the Street series by Stan Burridge was broadcast). Her final long-term assignment on 5 Live was as co-presenter of its Drive show on weekday afternoons with Peter Allen. She and Allen have won four Sony Gold Awards, and their relationship on air was described in The Times in 2002 as "a marriage made in radio heaven".

In September 1997, Garvey was a passenger on the Swansea train in the Southall rail crash, and received praise for her on-the-spot reports.

In May 2007, in a discussion on the tenth anniversary of the Labour Party gaining power in the United Kingdom, Garvey unwittingly revealed an apparent pro-Labour bias at the BBC. She reminisced how, the morning after the 1997 general election, "the corridors of Broadcasting House were strewn with empty champagne bottles – I will always remember that", though adding that the BBC had "perhaps fallen out of love with Labour" in more recent years.

In September 2007, it was announced she would leave 5 Live after 13 years. On 8 October 2007, she joined BBC Radio 4's Woman's Hour programme as the second principal presenter, succeeding Martha Kearney in the role. She created a minor stir in February 2008 in an interview in The Guardian, describing Woman's Hour as too middle-class and fixated on cooking. She returned briefly to BBC Radio 5 Live in November 2011 as a stand-in presenter on the Double Take programme.

In June 2016, it was announced Garvey would be reunited with Allen on BBC Radio 5 Live, for a new Sunday-evening programme.

On 29 March 2017, Garvey, with fellow broadcaster Fi Glover, started a weekly podcast series from BBC Radio 4, Fortunately...with Fi and Jane. Fortunately started broadcasting on BBC Radio 4 on 12 January 2021.

As of 2018, Garvey earned between £150,000 and £160,000, making her one of the top 25 highest-paid presenters at the BBC.

Jane Garvey broadcast her final Woman's Hour on 31 December 2020.

In June 2021, Garvey joined the Radio Times as the new weekly television columnist, replacing retiring Alison Graham.

On 10 October 2022, Garvey and co-presenter Fi Glover left the BBC for Times Radio, where they present a live show from 3 pm-5 pm, Monday to Thursday, as well as the podcast Off Air... with Jane and Fi.

=== Breach of impartiality guidelines ===
Garvey was found to have breached BBC guidelines on impartiality in the 1 October 2018 broadcast of Woman's Hour discussing the nomination of Judge Brett Kavanaugh to the US Supreme Court. The main interviewee had compared the allegations against Kavanaugh with previous allegations against Judge Clarence Thomas, with a listener complaining about the bias of the interviewee selection and presenter. The BBC Executive Complaints Unit partially upheld the complaint and ruled Garvey "gave the impression of sympathising with the viewpoint" of the biased interviewee, and "did not challenge the interviewee in a manner which would have ensured due impartiality". As a result of Garvey's breach of BBC guidelines, the Woman’s Hour team and production staff had to undertake training on impartiality.

== Personal life ==
Garvey has described her childhood as "cosy, predictable and loving", and has said her maternal grandmother's living with her family while she was growing up contributed to her love of interviewing older women. She says she is a feminist.

Garvey married the television presenter Adrian Chiles in September 1998 in Swansea. They lived in Shepherd's Bush, west London, and have two daughters. Chiles is known to be a dedicated West Bromwich Albion fan; when asked in 2004 whether the football club would be promoted that season, Garvey commented: "I flaming hope not. Last time Albion got promoted, I gave birth nine months later."

In June 2008, Chiles and Garvey separated; they were divorced in October 2009.

In July 2019, Garvey received an honorary doctorate from the University of Birmingham.
