= World Briefing =

BBC news programme

- Genre: News, current events, and factual
- Running time: Weekdays for half hour at 0100, 1000, 1400, 1500, 1800, 2100, 2200, 2300 (GMT) (as at Spring 2011)
- Country of origin: United Kingdom
- Language(s): English
- Home station: BBC World Service
- Recording studio: Broadcasting House
- Original release: 2 January 2001 – 31 March 2013
- No. of series: 12
- No. of episodes: 13,000+
- Website: https://www.bbc.co.uk/programmes/p002vsnc

World Briefing is BBC World Service's longtime news strand. It has broadcast roughly more than 13,000 unique episodes. Along with The World Today, Newshour, World Update and World: Have Your Say, it covered a large part of the schedule (four hours each weekday). It was broadcast on the hour as a half-hour programme whenever other news strands were not on air. Each individual version of the BBC World Service opted in or out of various editions. Public radio stations around the world also broadcast various editions of World Briefing.

On 25 March 2013, BBC World Service announced that World Briefing would be cancelled and replaced by The Newsroom. The Newsroom first aired on 1 April 2013 at 11 am GMT. Unlike World Briefing, The Newsroom airs daily on a less frequent basis (only up to six times per day).

== Presenters ==
The presenters were:

- David Bamford
- Oliver Conway
- Frederick Dove
- Jackie Leonard
- Andrew Peach
- Valerie Sanderson
- Maddy Savage
- Doreen Walton

== See also ==
- BBC World Service, the home of World Briefing
- BBC News
- BBC World News, The BBC's International Television Station
