= BBC Albanian Service =

Former branch of the BBC World Service

BBC Albanian Service BBC Shqiptar
- Type: Radio network and website
- Country: United Kingdom
- Availability: International
- Owner: BBC
- Key people: Sarah Gibson (Head of Service)
- Launch date: 1940; 1993
- Dissolved: 1967; 2011
- Official website: www.bbcalbanian.com

The BBC Albanian Service (Albanian: BBC Shqiptar) was a foreign language service of the BBC World Service. It ceased operations on 28 February 2011.
