= Emma Gannon =

English writer

- Born: Emma Gannon; 16 June 1989 (age 37); Exeter, Devon, England
- Occupations: Author, broadcaster
- Website: www.emmagannon.co.uk

Emma Gannon (born 16 June 1989) is an English writer who publishes the newsletter The Hyphen, Webby nominated podcast Ctrl Alt Delete and Sunday Times bestselling books. In 2018, she was one of Forbes 30 Under 30 in media and marketing. The Evening Standard called her "the spokesperson for the internet generation". In 2023, The Times said Gannon was "among Britain’s most prominent Substack bloggers." In 2024, The Bookseller said she was "one of the most popular UK novelists on Substack."

== Early life ==
Gannon grew up in Exeter, Devon. She attended The Maynard School in Exeter. She was featured in the Spring 2018 edition of the Maynard magazine The Word, in the article "Old Maynardians with their own businesses". She studied English and Film at the University of Southampton.

== Early career ==
At the age of 21, Gannon moved to London and took her first job working at the Hill & Knowlton agency working on P&G PR campaigns. She then worked for the magazine The Debrief, followed by Condé Nast. In 2016, she was selected by Microsoft to appear in their TV campaign showcasing her multi-hyphenate working life.

== Writing career ==
In 2015, Gannon landed a book deal off the back off her then blog Girl Lost In The City, called Ctrl Alt Delete: How I Grew Up Online. Her first book Ctrl Alt Delete came out in 2016 with Ebury, Penguin Random House. In 2017, Gannon signed a book deal with Hodder & Stoughton for The Multi-Hyphen Method, "a new business book for the digital age" which became a Sunday Times business bestseller. It also became an immediate No.1 Amazon bestseller, and was endorsed by Richard Branson. The Independent voted it one of the "10 best business books by women". From 2016-2023, Emma ran the podcast Ctrl Alt Delete, which has had over 12 million downloads, and voted one of the best podcasts for curious minds by Wired.

In 2020, she published her debut novel, Olive with Harper Collins. The novel was nominated for a Dublin Literary Award in 2022. In 2020, she also published the non-fiction title SABOTAGE with Hodder & Stoughton, a book that was previously published with independent publisher The Pound Project.

In 2022, she published (Dis)Connected with Hodder & Stoughton, a book about being more "human online" positively endorsed by The Financial Times.

In 2022, she also launched The Hyphen, one of the most popular newsletters on the Substack platform. In 2023, The Times called Gannon “one of Britain’s most prominent Substack bloggers”. Press Gazette profiled her as one of the first in the UK to make six figures from the platform.

In 2023, she published The Success Myth with Transworld, Penguin Random House which was endorsed by Annie Mac, Martha Beck, comedian Tom Allen, columnist Meera Sodha and actress Sian Clifford.

In 2025, she published her second novel Table For One with Harper Collins.
