= Today (BBC Radio 4) =

British radio programme

- Genre: News, current events, and factual
- Running time: 120–180 minutes
- Country of origin: United Kingdom
- Language: English
- Home station: BBC Home Service (1957–1967); BBC Radio 4 (1967–present); BBC News on BBC Sounds (2024–present)
- Hosted by: Justin Webb; Nick Robinson; Anna Foster
- Edited by: Rebecca Keating
- Recording studio: Broadcasting House, London (1957–1997; 2012–present); BBC Television Centre, London (1997–2012)
- Original release: 28 October 1957 – present
- Website: www.bbc.co.uk/today

Today, colloquially known as the Today programme, is BBC Radio 4's long-running morning news and current-affairs radio programme. Broadcast on Monday to Saturday from 06:00 to 09:00 (starting on Saturday at 07:00), it is produced by BBC News and is the highest-rated programme on Radio 4 and one of the BBC's most popular programmes across its radio networks. In-depth political interviews and reports are interspersed with regular news bulletins, as well as Thought for the Day. It has been voted the most influential news programme in Britain in setting the political agenda, with an average weekly listening audience around 6 million.

== History ==
Today was launched on the BBC Home Service on 28 October 1957 as a programme of "topical talks" to give listeners an alternative to listening to light music. The programme's founders were Isa Benzie and Janet Quigley. Benzie gave the programme its name and served as its first de facto editor. It was initially broadcast as two 20-minute editions slotted in around the existing news bulletins and religious and musical items. It became part of the BBC's Current Affairs department in 1963 and started to become more news orientated. The two editions also became longer, and by the end of the 1960s it had become a single programme two hours in length that enveloped the news bulletins and the religious talk that had become Thought for the Day in 1970. In May 1977, Radio 4 controller Ian McIntyre separated the programme in to two 25-minute parts, filling the gap with Up to the Hour. The new format was unpopular with BBC staff, including Peter Donaldson, who on at least one occasion openly ridiculed the programme on air. It also provoked comments in the diary columns of the daily newspapers. From July 1978, Today returned to its previous length and Up to the Hour was dropped.

Jack de Manio became its principal presenter in 1958. He was held in affection by listeners, but became notorious for on-air gaffes (announcing a documentary on Nigeria titled The Land of Niger as The Land of Nigger, and referring to Yoko Ono as "Yoko Hama, or whatever her name is", for instance). In 1970 the programme format was changed so that there were two presenters each day. De Manio left in 1971, and in the mid-1970s the team of John Timpson and Brian Redhead became established. Timpson had been critical of the content, style and professionalism of Today; describing it once as "not so much a programme, more a way of telling the time" and being filled with "eccentric octogenarians, prize pumpkins, and folk who ate lightbulbs and spiders".

In the late 1970s and early 1980s, under editors Ken Goudie and Julian Holland, Today made moves to broaden its appeal away from broadcasting national politics with London-centric bias. Presentation was split for a time between London, usually by John Timpson, and from Manchester, usually by Brian Redhead. The objective was to make it more of a balanced, national programme. The on-air humour of the two presenters and the split of locations made the programme very popular and influential. Brian Redhead was quoted, "If you want to drop a word in the ear of the nation, then this is the programme in which to do it." This pairing lasted until Timpson's retirement in 1986. Other presenters during this period included Libby Purves in the late 1970s. John Humphrys and Sue MacGregor joined the rotating list of presenters in 1986. Peter Hobday, who had first broadcast on the programme in the 1950s, was a regular presenter from the early 1980s and a favourite with listeners because of his relaxed, urbane style.

By this time the programme was benefiting from publicity gained after it became known that Prime Minister Margaret Thatcher was a regular listener. Ministers thus became keen to go on the programme, but the tough, confrontational interviewing they encountered led to accusations that the BBC was biased. Criticism was particularly directed against Redhead, who was often seen as being on the left. Chancellor Nigel Lawson accused him, during a live interview in 1988, of having been a Labour voter all his life. The style of the male interviewers was analysed and contrasted with the approach of MacGregor, who was alleged to be giving subjects an easier time. The "Big 8:10" interview that follows the 8:00 news had become an important institution of British politics, a position it retains.

After Brian Redhead died in January 1994, James Naughtie became a member of the team. Peter Hobday presented the programme regularly until 1996; Sarah Montague replaced MacGregor in 2002. Carolyn Quinn was a regular presenter until 2008 as was Edward Stourton until 2009. Other more occasional presenters include the BBC's Stephen Sackur and Tim Franks. Evan Davis and Justin Webb were the newest regular presenters to join the roster until Mishal Husain in 2013. Husain became the second regular female presenter when Naughtie began to cover the Scottish Independence referendum as a Good Morning Scotland presenter for two days a week, and across the BBC's output. Naughtie returned to Today before the 2015 general election.

On 7 July 2015, the BBC announced that James Naughtie was to leave the programme, to become a Special Correspondent for Radio 4. Two days later, Nick Robinson was announced as Naughtie's replacement. In April 2018, Martha Kearney joined the team in a straight swap with Sarah Montague, who left to take over Kearney's old role as lead presenter of The World at One.

On 19 September 2019, John Humphrys hosted his last edition of Today, after 32 years on the show. His last major guests were former Prime Ministers David Cameron and Tony Blair, as well as drag personality Dame Edna Everage. Two years later Amol Rajan joined the presenting team.

Martha Kearney announced her intention to step down in February 2024; she was replaced by Woman's Hour presenter Emma Barnett.

On 17 December 2024, Mishal Husain hosted her final shift as Today co-presenter, with several past and present Today presenters joining her in the studio to pay tribute. The BBC announced on 10 March 2025 that presenter Anna Foster would join the programme's presenting team in April 2025.

In 2026, John Humphrys criticised the programme for being overly deferential to guests.

== Personnel ==
=== Current presenters ===
Year began	Presenter
2009	Justin Webb
2015	Nick Robinson
2025	Anna Foster
Regular Stand-In presenters
2022	Simon Jack
2024	Jonny Dymond
2026	Katya Adler

=== Former presenters ===
The longest-serving presenter on Today was John Humphrys, who presented the programme for 32 years and 260 days between 1987 and 2019.

- Robert Hudson (1964–1968)
- John Tidmarsh (1968–1969)
- Jack de Manio (1958–1971)
- Douglas Cameron (1970–1974)
- Robert Robinson (1971–1974)
- Desmond Lynam (1974–1975)
- Barry Norman (1974–1976)
- Gillian Reynolds (1975–1976)
- Paul Barnes (1975–1977)
- Nigel Rees (1976–1978)
- Libby Purves (1978–1981)
- Hugh Sykes (1978–1982)
- John Timpson (1964, 1970–1976, 1978–1986)
- Jenni Murray (1985–1987)
- Brian Redhead (1975–1993)
- Peter Hobday (1983–1996)
- Anna Ford (1993–1999)
- Winifred Robinson (1996–2000)
- Sue MacGregor (1984–2002)
- Carolyn Quinn (2004–2008)
- Edward Stourton (1999–2009)
- Evan Davis (2007–2014)
- James Naughtie (1994–2015)
- Sarah Montague (2001–2018)
- John Humphrys (1987–2019)
- Martha Kearney (2018–2024)
- Mishal Husain (2013–2024)
- Amol Rajan (2021-2026)
- Emma Barnett (2024-2026)

=== Newsreaders ===
Among the newsreaders are Chris Aldridge, Viji Alles, Charles Carroll, Lisa Costello, Caroline Nicholls, Tina Ritchie, Alan Smith, Tom Sandars, and Jane Steel.

=== Editors ===
- Marshall Stewart (1970-74)
- Alistair Osborne (1974-76)
- Mike Chaney (1976-78)
- Ken Goudie (1978-81)
- Julian Holland (journalist) (1981-86)
- Jenny Abramsky (1986–1987)
- Phil Harding (1987–1993)
- Roger Mosey (1993–1997)
- Rod Liddle (1998–2002)
- Kevin Marsh (2002–2006)
- Ceri Thomas (2006–2012)
- Jamie Angus (2013–2017)
- Sarah Sands (2017–2020)
- Owenna Griffiths (2020–2026)
- Rebecca Keating (2026–)

==== Guest editors ====
Beginning in 2003, for over one week at the end of December, guest editors have been invited to commission items for one edition of the programme. These usually reflect their social or cultural interests and at the end of each edition the guest editor is interviewed by a member of the regular presenting team about the experience. Guest editors participating in the inaugural year of this feature were Monica Ali, Thom Yorke, Stephen Hawking, and Norman Tebbit, who is a frequent critic of the programme. Since its inception, notable guest editors have included: David Blunkett, who used the programme as an opportunity to "turn the tables" on John Humphrys in 2005; Rowan Williams, the Archbishop of Canterbury, whose appearance on 29 December 2006 encompassed discussions of his growing concerns about the "justification" for the invasion of Iraq, Britain's role in the affair, and the consequences for British armed forces; and Peter Hennessy, who, on 28 December 2007, led a visit to HMS Vigilant (a British Trident submarine) alongside its base at Faslane. Others including Queen Noor of Jordan (2005), Bono (2004) and Sarah, Duchess of York (2004) have also pitched in for this one-day editorial stint to promote their causes and interests.

== Notable features ==
The programme has a regular slot for sports news and items, "Sports Desk", between 26 and 30 minutes past each hour. From 1977 to 2024 it carried a daily horse racing tip.

If Parliament is in session the previous day there will be a summary at about 06:50 (Yesterday in Parliament)

Journalist and historian Peter Hennessy wrote in one of his books that a test that the commander of a British nuclear-missile submarine must use to determine whether the UK has been the target of a nuclear attack (in which case he has sealed orders which may authorise him to fire his nuclear missiles in retaliation), is to listen for the presence of Today on Radio 4's frequencies. If a certain number of days (said to be three) pass without the programme being broadcast, that is to be taken as evidence that the orders must be executed. The true conditions are secret and Hennessy has never revealed his sources for this story, leading Paul Donovan, author of a book about Today, to express some scepticism about it. However, the longwave signal of Radio 4 was capable of penetrating to surface depths where submarines can rise, although it did not have the range required to be heard at this depth far from the UK's coastal waters.

== Message boards ==
In 2001, the Today programme created a system of message boards allowing the users of its web site to challenge thinking on current affairs with all those contributing. Available statistics indicate the amassing, over five years, of up to 18,000 separate discussions – topic threads – sometimes with as many as 3,000 contributions per thread. However, on 16 November 2006 the programme changed its board policy so that only the producers of Today could start a thread, but all contributors could still join in with them. This action appeared to have been unpopular with past contributors and, it seems, many stopped dealing with Today in favour of other outlets. After the changes there were fewer contributions, but, on occasion, contributions made by the public were featured on-air in the Today programme. Message boards dedicated to the Today programme were discontinued around mid-2008 and listeners were invited to use the general BBC 'Have Your Say' board.

== Podcast ==
A podcast, Beyond Today, was launched on 29 October 2018. Presented alternately by Tina Daheley and Matthew Price and aimed at a younger audience, the production team contains the same number of women from black and ethnic minority backgrounds as it does men.

Another podcast, The Today Podcast, was launched on 5 October 2023 and is presented by Amol Rajan and Nick Robinson. They discuss the news stories as featured on The Today Programme.

== Controversy ==
Today found itself in the midst of controversy again in 2002, when its editor Rod Liddle wrote a column in The Guardian that was extremely critical of the Countryside Alliance and which raised questions about his own impartiality. In the article, he wrote that catching "a glimpse of the forces supporting the Countryside Alliance: the public schools that laid on coaches; the fusty, belch-filled dining rooms of the London clubs that opened their doors, for the first time, to the protesters; the Prince of Wales and, of course, Camilla ... and suddenly, rather gloriously, it might be that you remember [why you voted Labour] once again." He resigned from his post on Today.

In the summer of 2003, Today once again found itself at the centre of allegations of political bias, this time against a Labour government. The controversy arose after Today broadcast a report by its correspondent Andrew Gilligan. The report alleged that a dossier the British Government had produced to convince the British public of the need to invade Iraq had been "sexed up" (deliberately exaggerated), and that the government had known this prior to publishing it. In his live interview with presenter John Humphrys, just after 6.07 a.m., Gilligan asserted that the dossier and the Government "probably knew" that one of the main claims in the dossier "was wrong". Gilligan's anonymous source for the claim was Dr David Kelly, a key adviser on biological weapons who had worked in Iraq – though it was never established whether Dr Kelly had actually used the words Gilligan attributed to him. In the furore that followed Gilligan's report, Kelly's name became public and he was forced to appear before the Foreign Affairs Select Committee. Shortly afterward he was found dead following presumed suicide. In the ensuing public inquiry (the Hutton Inquiry), which reported in January 2004, the BBC was heavily criticised. This led to the resignation of the BBC's chairman, Gavyn Davies, the Director-General, Greg Dyke, and Andrew Gilligan.

On Friday 5 November 2010, the programme was not broadcast due to 48-hour strike action at the BBC. Transmission continued the next day, in spite of ongoing industrial action, as Evan Davis and Sarah Montague decided to break the strike.

== Criticism ==
"Radio 4 on the whole is good for using serious female presenters, but the Today programme lets it down badly", commented former Today newsreader Alice Arnold early in 2013, pointing out that Sarah Montague was (then) the only female presenter among the regular presenters. During 2010, editor Ceri Thomas acknowledged that the gender balance was not ideal, but faced criticism for saying in an interview that the programme was not going to be the "first place you'll see those changes because it's just too tough an environment for novices, frankly". Radio 4 presenter Mariella Frostrup described the men involved in running the programme in an interview as "a bunch of misogynists", but later retracted this statement by saying she had been "careless" in her vocabulary.

In 2011, Guardian journalist Kira Cochrane and colleagues researched the female–male ratio in the British media for a month. Concerning Today they found 83.5% of the contributors were male and the remaining 16.5% female. The issue was thought important enough for culture minister Ed Vaizey to request a meeting with the BBC in January 2012, and for Director-General George Entwistle, at the start of his brief period in charge of the BBC, to advocate that the next new Today presenter should be female.

An interview with David Cameron conducted by John Humphrys in 2006 received 200 complaints concerning Humphrys' aggressive approach and "excessive" interruptions. Ceri Thomas became the programme's editor shortly afterwards and was asked about this issue. "I'm not going to rule out the confrontational interview as it is on occasion necessary... [A]ll the evidence we've got shows that the audience is overwhelmingly behind John Humphrys in general and support our right to do [this] kind of interviews."

In a 2012 article decrying the BBC's attitude to science reporting, Guardian science columnist Martin Robbins wrote: "The Today programme claims to be serious, but seems to work on the basis that the best way to enlighten viewers is to take two people and force them into a sort of intellectual-masturbation death match. Graham Linehan appeared on the show last year to discuss his adaptation of The Ladykillers and found himself ambushed by questions that weren't just hostile, but sometimes completely bizarre." Expert Women's Days, intended by the BBC as a training exercise intended in part to increase the number of female interviewees on Today, took place in several locations in 2013.

== See also ==
- Greatest Painting in Britain Vote, a Today listener poll in 2005
- PM, Radio 4's early evening stablemate to the Today programme
- The World at One, Radio 4's afternoon stablemate to the Today programme
- The World Tonight, Radio 4's late evening stablemate to the Today programme
- Roundabout East Anglia, BBC East's regional opt-out from the Today programme in the 1970s
- Morning Sou'West, BBC South West's regional opt-out from the Today programme in the 1970s and early 1980s
