= Peter Hobday (presenter) =

British journalist (1937–2020)

Peter James Hobday (16 February 1937 – 18 January 2020) was a British radio presenter, best known for presenting the early-morning BBC Radio 4 breakfast current affairs programme Today throughout the 1980s, remaining until 1996. He was a colleague of Brian Redhead, and the two men were a regular presenting duo on the programme. Hobday was the presenter of The Money Programme on BBC Two television. He helped launch the late-night current affairs programme Newsnight on BBC2, where he was both presenter and economic specialist. He was also involved in launching In Business on Radio 4.

His removal from the Today programme in 1996 was greeted with dismay from its listeners, and allegations of ageism were levied at the BBC. Later, he presented BBC Radio 4's World at One. Bilingual in French and English, and competent in Italian, he also contributed to French and French-Canadian television.

Following his journalistic career, Hobday ran media training sessions for industry leaders and senior union officials, served as a visiting professor at De Montfort University, and worked as a conference chairman. He divided much of his time between London and Italy, and wrote a memoir titled In the Valley of the Fireflies: An Englishman in Umbria (1995).

Hobday died on 18 January 2020.

His brother John Hobday, who predeceased him, took the part of the first police constable in Ambridge in BBC Radio 4's The Archers.

== Books ==
- Man the Industrialist (Priory Press, 1973) ISBN 978-0-85078-141-0 "Social History of Science Library" series
- Saudi Arabia Today: An Introduction to the Richest Oil Power (Palgrave Macmillan, 1978) ISBN 978-1-34903-216-7
- In the Valley of the Fireflies. An Englishman in Umbria (Michael Joseph, 1995) ISBN 978-0-71810-080-3
- Simple Guide to England: Customs & Etiquette (Simple Guides, 1998) ISBN 978-1-86034-036-9
- Managing the Message: How the Media Can Be Influenced (London House, 2000) ISBN 978-1-90280-918-2
- The Girl in Rose: Haydn's Last Love (Weidenfeld & Nicolson, 2004) ISBN 978-0-29784-747-2
