= Sue MacGregor =

British broadcaster

Sue MacGregor CBE
- Born: Susan Katriona MacGregor; 30 August 1941 (age 85); Oxford, England
- Education: Herschel Girls' School, Cape Town
- Occupation: Broadcaster
- Known for: Presenting BBC Radio 4's Woman's Hour and Today

Susan Katriona MacGregor CBE (born 30 August 1941) is a British broadcaster. She is best known as a former presenter of BBC Radio 4's Woman's Hour and later the Today programme.

== Early life ==
MacGregor was born in Oxford, England. Her parents were Scottish and emigrated to South Africa, where she was brought up. Her father was a neurologist who was in the Royal Army Medical Corps with the British 14th Army in Burma during the Second World War. She attended the Herschel Girls' School, a private boarding school in Cape Town. She completed her private education at the École de commerce in Neuchâtel, Switzerland, and at an English college called the House of Citizenship.

== Career in broadcasting ==
MacGregor worked as a typist at Australia House in London, then became a temporary junior secretary at the BBC. This entitled her to an induction course, where she was taught the BBC's method of working.

Returning to South Africa, she began her broadcasting career there on the SABC's English-language radio service. Initially joining the BBC in 1967 as a reporter for The World At One, she hosted Woman's Hour from 1972 until 1987. In 1984, she became one of the hosts of BBC Radio 4's Today programme, a position she held until 2002.

That same year, she was appointed a CBE for her services to broadcasting. MacGregor is a trustee of UNICEF and was a trustee of the John Ellerman Foundation. She is also on the Chancellor's Forum for the London Institute and an honorary graduate of several universities, among them the University of Nottingham, Nottingham Trent and Dundee.

MacGregor hosted The Reunion on BBC Radio 4 from 2003 to 2019.

In late 2010, she recorded her final episode as chair of the popular book programme A Good Read, also on BBC Radio 4. After seven years and approximately 500 book reviews, she was the show's longest serving presenter at the time.

== Personal life ==
MacGregor's autobiography, Woman of Today, published in 2002, contained candid revelations and outlined her relationships, including an affair with Leonard Rossiter.
