= Simon Jack =

English business journalist and news correspondent

- Born: 10 May 1971 (age 55); London, England
- Education: Merchant Taylors' Boys' School, Crosby
- Alma mater: St John's College, Oxford
- Occupations: Journalist, news correspondent
- Employer: BBC
- Title: Business Editor of BBC News (2016–present)
- Spouse: Suzy Barry

Simon Jack (born 10 May 1971) is an English business journalist and news correspondent. He is currently the business editor for BBC News, known for appearing on BBC Breakfast until September 2011 and on BBC Radio 4's Today programme. He has also presented business and financial podcasts for The Daily Telegraph.

== Education ==
Simon Jack was born on 10 May 1971 in London. He attended Merchant Taylors' Boys' School, Crosby, Merseyside, and graduated from St John's College, Oxford with a BA in Philosophy, Politics and Economics. Of his time at the University of Oxford, Jack said: “I did the same degree as David Cameron. I was a contemporary of George Osborne. I knew him a little bit. He was well-known at university and his notoriety of his membership of certain clubs is well known – like the Bullingdon. I wasn't a member of any of those."

== Career ==
Before entering journalism, Jack worked for a decade as a corporate and investment banker in London, New York City and Bermuda. He has said that he neither liked the work, nor showed much ability at it. In 2003 he joined the BBC's business and economics unit and since then has worked on BBC Radio 4's Today Programme and BBC Radio 5 Live's Wake Up to Money. He has also presented business and financial podcasts for The Daily Telegraph.

Jack was frequently seen on British television during the fortnight beginning on 7 September 2008 during which he reported for BBC News, the BBC News Channel and Working Lunch on the banking crisis that saw the Federal takeover of Fannie Mae and Freddie Mac, the Bankruptcy of Lehman Brothers, the bailout of AIG and the Lloyds TSB takeover of HBOS. He was often seen reporting from the London Stock Exchange, Canary Wharf and outside the offices of HBOS and Lehman Brothers in London.

Jack replaced Declan Curry as business presenter for BBC Breakfast in October 2008. In April 2010, he presented BBC Breakfast alongside Sian Williams while regular presenter Bill Turnbull followed the 2010 general election campaign trail. In September 2011, he left the BBC Breakfast team to join BBC Radio 4's Today.

On 13 April 2015 Jack, whose father killed himself, appeared in a BBC Panorama series relating to the survivors of suicide which investigated why more middle-aged men kill themselves than any other group.

On 5 February 2016, Jack was appointed the BBC's Business Editor, replacing the promoted Kamal Ahmed.

On 3 July 2023, Jack sat next to Dame Alison Rose, the chief executive of NatWest bank at the BBC Correspondents’ Charity Dinner. The following day Jack claimed that Nigel Farage had his bank account at Coutts closed for falling "below the financial threshold required to hold an account". However after submitting a subject access request in July, Farage published a 40-page internal document from Coutts, which contained minutes from a meeting of the bank's Wealth Reputational Risk Committee on 17 November 2022, describing Farage as a "disingenuous grifter" who promoted "xenophobic, chauvinistic and racist views", and said his "views were at odds with our position as an inclusive organisation", with "risk factors including... controversial public statements which were felt to conflict with the bank’s purpose", whilst financially his account's "economic contribution is now sufficient to retain on a commercial basis”.

On 24 July 2023, Jack issued an apology to Farage on X for the story. Farage accepted the apology. Jack said his story was "from a trusted and senior source. However, the information turned out to be incomplete and inaccurate." On 25 July, Rose admitted to 'serious error of judgement' in discussing Farage's Coutts accounts with Jack, revealing that she had been the source of the story.

== Personal life ==
Jack lives in Notting Hill and is married to Suzy Barry; he is a son-in-law of the composer John Barry.

Media offices
Preceded by Declan Curry	Business Presenter: BBC Breakfast; 2008–2011	Succeeded by Steph McGovern
Preceded by Adam Shaw	Business Presenter: Today; 2011–2016	Vacant
Preceded by Kamal Ahmed	Business Editor: BBC News; 2016–present	Incumbent
