= Heresy (radio series) =

- Genre: Comedy talk show
- Running time: 30 minutes
- Country of origin: United Kingdom
- Language: English
- Home station: BBC Radio 4
- Starring: David Baddiel (series 1–4); Victoria Coren Mitchell (series 5–)
- Created by: David Baddiel
- Original release: 31 December 2003 – Present
- No. of series: 13 and a pilot
- No. of episodes: 77
- Opening theme: "Beers, Steers, And Queers" by Revolting Cocks
- Website: BBC website

Heresy is a comedy talk show on BBC Radio 4, created and originally hosted by David Baddiel, now hosted by Victoria Coren Mitchell. In the show, the presenter and a panel of guests commit "heresy" by challenging people's most deeply received opinions on a subject, in front of a studio audience.

For example, received wisdom in 2004 was that New Labour is all about spin, so the panel tried to argue that New Labour was not all about spin, and the guests had to try to make the audience change their minds. Other assumptions challenged have included, "We should never negotiate with terrorists", "Television is dumbing down" and "We are on the brink of an environmental catastrophe".

The pilot and first series had four guests on each episode, but this has since been reduced to three. In the fifth series, Coren Mitchell replaced Baddiel as host.

In one episode Jo Brand made a joke about milkshakes being thrown over politicians and suggested that battery acid might be used instead. This was heavily criticised in the media and Ofcom looked into the case but did not pursue an investigation.

== Episodes ==
=== Pilot and Series 1 ===
Episode	First broadcast	Guests	Subjects
1. Pilot	31-12-2003	Armando Iannucci, Peter Bradshaw, David Walliams, Victoria Coren	"The Atkins diet is bad for your health", "Rugby players are saints, football players are sinners", "David Blaine's 44 days of starvation was a magician's trick", "The royal family is being destroyed by scandal", "Gigli was a turkey"
2. 1-1	02-12-2004	Sue Perkins, Fi Glover, Simon Hoggart, Michael Bywater	"Women are better than men at expressing their emotions", "The Labour party's seven years in power has been built on spin", "We are too obsessed with celebrity"
3. 1-2	09-12-2004	Alan Davies, David Walliams, Peter Bradshaw, Jenny Colgan	"Public figures should be allowed to have a private life", "There is something intrinsically naff about being middle class", "The Libertines are at the cutting edge of popular music"
4. 1-3	16-12-2004	Victoria Coren, Peter Bradshaw, Zoë Williams, Michael Bywater	"Reality TV and talent shows are bringing down television standards", "Pornography degrades women", "The Olympic Games would be great for Britain"
5. 1-4	23-12-2004	Armando Iannucci, John O'Farrell, Zoë Williams, Victoria Coren	"People should be encouraged to believe that they can achieve their dreams", "An organic turkey is a happy turkey", "Christmas has become too commercialized"

=== Series 2 ===
Episode	First broadcast	Guests	Subjects
6. 2-1	22-06-2005	John O'Farrell, Peter Bradshaw, Victoria Coren	"There should be more bobbies on the beat", "Education is a good thing", "You can't believe what you read in the papers"
7. 2-2	29-06-2005	John O'Farrell, Jonathan Ross, Michael Bywater	"The Beatles are the best band in pop music ever", "Tom Cruise and Katie Holmes' relationship is a publicity fiction", "The honours system is outdated and irrelevant"
8. 2-3	06-07-2005	Peter Bradshaw, Chris Langham, Sanjeev Bhaskar	"Britain will never produce a great tennis player until the middle classes let other people play", "Starbucks is a bad thing", "It's OK to legalize cannabis as it is a soft drug"
9. 2-4	13-07-2005	Michael Bywater, Sue Perkins, Hugh Dennis	"The Olympic Games would be great for Britain (Revisited)", "Voter apathy is a bad thing", "The Da Vinci Code is a rubbish book", "The sandwich is the best convenience food there is"
10. 2-5	20-07-2005	Sue Perkins, Armando Iannucci, Frank Skinner	"Genius is often closely related to madness", "There was something suspicious about Princess Diana's death", "Some things are so bad, they're good"
11. 2-6	27-07-2005	John O'Farrell, Matt Lucas, David Walliams	"We are not afraid (because of the London 2005 bombings)", "Choice is a good thing", "There is no such thing as bad publicity"

=== Series 3 ===
Episode	First broadcast	Guests	Subjects
12. 3-1	10-05-2006	Richard Herring, Sue Perkins, Peter Bradshaw	"It doesn't matter what you look like, it's what's underneath that counts", "We must look to our children", "Margaret Thatcher was a bad thing"
13. 3-2	17-05-2006	Stewart Lee, Reginald D. Hunter, Joanna Scanlan	"The views of religious people must be respected", "We are all brothers/sisters under the skin", "The new Doctor Who is much better than the old one"
14. 3-3	24-05-2006	Jonathan Ross, Michael Bywater, Ed Byrne	"Heather Mills just married Paul McCartney for his money", "James Blunt is a middle class ponce whose music is just for big girls", "Hollywood films are just box office tat"
15. 3-4	31-05-2006	Lee Mack, Ruby Wax, Russell Brand	"Cosmetic surgery only makes you look worse", "The secret of happiness is to live in the moment", "Flaunting your wealth is common and vulgar"
16. 3-5	07-06-2006	Jimmy Carr, Chris Addison, Rhys Thomas	"We would have resisted the German occupation more bravely than the French", "Prog rock was overblown pretentious nonsense", "Gingers are the last bastion of politically incorrect humour"
17. 3-6	14-06-2006	Frank Skinner, Lee Mack, Sean Lock	"Football used to be a game played by real men, now it's all just about money", "Women don't understand the offside rule or anything about football, really", "England can't win this World Cup without Wayne Rooney"

=== Series 4 ===
Episode	First broadcast	Guests	Subjects
18. 4-1	16-05-2007	Germaine Greer, Stewart Lee, Harry Enfield	"Men who deal with midlife crisis by buying a flash car and going out with much younger women are pathetic", "Classical music and opera is elitist", "Political correctness has gone mad"
19. 4-2	23-05-2007	Sue Perkins, Phil Hammond, Jo Brand	"The size 0 culture is a bad influence on women", "Children are better off with two parents", "The NHS is a good thing"
20. 4-3	30-05-2007	Jon Culshaw, Matt Lucas, Henning Wehn	"Germans have no sense of humour", "Men who are big fans of musicals are generally gay", "Sleeping with someone famous should not make you a celebrity"
21. 4-4	06-06-2007	Victoria Coren, Peter Bradshaw, Arthur Smith	"Militant feminism is a thing of the past", "There is such a thing as the British establishment and it is in control", "The England manager is an impossible job"
22. 4-5	13-06-2007	Fay Ripley, Sanjeev Bhaskar, David Aaronovitch	"Money can't buy you love", "You can be anti-zionist without being anti-semitic", "4x4's are a bad thing"
23. 4-6	20-06-2007	Jonathan Ross, Russell Brand, Michael McIntyre	"The Godfather is the best film ever", "There is a God", "Man-made global warming is the biggest thread to our planet"

=== Series 5 ===
Episode	First broadcast	Guests	Subjects
24. 5-1	15-05-2008	David Baddiel, Richard Coles, David Mitchell	"The queen is marvellous, but the other Royals are a waste of space", "We spend too much time on social networking sites at the expense of real friendship", "Barbara was the sexy one in The Good Life"
25. 5-2	22-05-2008	Sue Perkins, Euan Ferguson, Richard Herring	"If you want to get dates you should join an evening class", "To succeed in politics you must be media-savvy", "The Scots are tougher than the English"
26. 5-3	29-05-2008	Peter Bradshaw, Caitlin Moran, Jo Caulfield	"Daniel Day-Lewis is a better actor than Christopher Biggins", "There is nothing more beautiful than the innocence of a child", "The free nations of the world should use the 2008 Olympics to show their disapproval of China"
27. 5-4	05-06-2008	Dave Gorman, Clive James, Mark Steel	"Travel broadens the mind", "There are too many repeats on TV", "We are lucky not to live in a dictatorship"
28. 5-5	12-06-2008	Simon Evans, Richard Coles, Andrew Collins	"If the Church of England wants to survive, it needs to get off the mat and start fighting", "The Rolling Stones are too old to keep touring", "We are safe because we have gun control"
29. 5-6	19-06-2008	David Mitchell, Michael Bywater, Arthur Smith	"Radio 4 is too geared towards middle aged, middle class Middle England", "Rising sea levels will prove disastrous for mankind", "Short men look silly with tall wives"

=== Series 6 ===
Episode	First broadcast	Guests	Subjects
30. 6-1	07-04-2009	Rufus Hound, David Baddiel, Germaine Greer	"Obama has given the world hope", "WAGs are bad role models for young women", "Book awards make it easier to choose good books in a bookshop"
31. 6-2	14-04-2009	Mark Steel, Matthew Norman, Richard Coles	"The bankers are to blame for getting us into this mess", "People who go to psychics are gullible", "British cuisine is better now than it was in the nineteen seventies"
32. 6-3	28-04-2009	Lucy Mangan, Arthur Smith, Frank Skinner	"We should save Britain's art treasures from being sold abroad", "The smoking ban has worked out rather well", "A shell suit is inappropriate attire for a court appearance"
33. 6-4	05-05-2009	Euan Ferguson, Tanya Gold, David Mitchell	"There's something slightly unpleasant about women's boxing", "It's hard to admire Gary Glitter", "Dogs make good pets"
34. 6-5	12-05-2009	Dave Gorman, Sue Perkins, Jeremy Hardy	"One Third World Baby should be enough for any celebrity", "There are too many students around these days", "It's better to regret something you've done than something you haven't"
35. 6-6	19-05-2009	David Mitchell, Euan Ferguson, Clive James	"It's unpatriotic of Lewis Hamilton to live as a tax exile in Monte Carlo", "It's annoying how ill-equipped we are to deal with snowfall", "You can't trust what you read online"

=== Series 7 ===
Episode	First broadcast	Guests	Subjects
36. 7-1	19-05-2010	Rufus Hound, Grayson Perry, Julia Hartley-Brewer	"The Large Hadron Collider is a massive waste of money", "Women look better in men's clothes than men do in women's", "An artist who doesn't make his own work is a fraud"
37. 7-2	26-05-2010	Marcus Brigstocke, Natalie Haynes, Richard Coles	"Transport strikes are bad for commuters", "Kate Middleton should get a job", "Atheism is a more rational position than faith"
38. 7-3	02-06-2010	David Baddiel, Dave Gorman, Polly Vernon	"Ashley Cole is a bad person", "British comedy is more offensive than ever", "Catwalk fashion is unwearable for normal people"
39. 7-4	09-06-2010	Richard Herring, Mark Steel, Janet Street-Porter	"Cameron and Osborne are too posh by half", "If it doesn't involve running about, it's not a sport", "We might as well just stop listening to the weather forecast"
40. 7-5	16-06-2010	Matthew Norman, David Schneider, David Mitchell	"The TV shouldn't be used as a baby-sitter", "You shouldn't eat animals that are kept as pets", "Twitter is an act of massive collective narcissism"
41. 7-6	23-06-2010	Clive Anderson, Rufus Hound, Fern Britton	"It's ok to download a bit of film and music without paying", "There are too many celebrity chefs", "Jordan's marriage won't last"

=== Series 8 ===
Episode	First broadcast	Guests	Subjects
42. 8-1	30-11-2011	Mark Steel, Jessica Berens, Christopher Biggins	"Panto is an outdated art form", "Drunken displays on British high streets are a matter of national shame", "It would be nice to live in a house like Downton Abbey"
43. 8-2	07-12-2011	David Baddiel, Lucy Porter, Richard Osman	"The economy is up the creek without a paddle", "The innocence of children is snatched away too fast these days", "Britain is better off without the News of the World"
44. 8-3	14-12-2011	David Mitchell, Richard Coles, Diane Abbott MP	"The Labour Party chose the wrong Miliband", "You should not go to church just to get your kids in the local faith school", "If a friend is doing something for charity you should sponsor them"
45. 8-4	21-12-2011	Rufus Hound, Phil Hammond, Germaine Greer	"You should not self-diagnose using the Internet", "The Sixties were a great time to be young", "The best Christmas presents are the ones you make yourself"
46. 8-5	28-12-2011	Dave Gorman, Matthew Parris, Julia Hartley-Brewer	"I don't want celebrities telling me how to vote", "It's good news that sales of chick lit have slumped", "Princess Beatrice wore a terrible hat at the Royal Wedding"
47. 8-6	04-01-2012	Sue Perkins, Cerys Matthews, Maureen Lipman	"The world would be a better place if it were run by women", "It's more fun to be a pop star than a classical violinist", "Internet dating has lost its stygma"

=== Series 9 ===
Episode	First broadcast	Guests	Subjects
48. 9-1	16-05-2013	Lee Mack, David Schneider, Germaine Greer	"Andy Murray is a lot more likeable than he used to be", "Foxes are a pest", "Maths is more worthwhile than Media studies"
49. 9-2	23-05-2013	David Mitchell, Alex Horne, Germaine Greer	"There shouldn't be horse meat in a beef lasagna", "The voyage to Mars is a credit to human endeavour", "Video games should not be an Olympic sport"
50. 9-3	30-05-2013	Mark Steel, Bridget Christie, Matthew Norman	"Chris Huhne and his ex-wife got what they deserved", "Customer service should be better than it is", "It's time for Bruce Forsyth to retire"
51. 9-4	06-06-2013	Julia Hartley-Brewer, Richard Coles, Giles Coren	"Skyfall is not just a Bond movie, it's a proper film", "The Thatcher death parties were in bad taste", "It's sexy for men to be funny"
52. 9-5	13-06-2013	Miles Jupp, Sue Perkins, Richard Osman	"Prisons are too soft", "Lindsay Lohan would not be a good mother", "Nobody in a city needs a Four by four"
53. 9-6	20-06-2013	Katy Brand, David Baddiel, Richard Osman	"Crack cocaine ruined Whitney Houston's career", "It's not romantic to have a Prenup", "Paolo di Canio should not have done a fascist salute"

=== Series 10 ===
Episode	First broadcast	Guests	Subjects
54. 10-1	18-05-2016	Lloyd Langford, Katy Brand, Grayson Perry	"French Style", "God", "Adolf Hitler"
55. 10-2	25-05-2016	Alex Horne, Jonny Woo, Richard Osman	"Money", "Dress Codes", "Sexy TV Dramas"
56. 10-3	01-06-2016	Lee Mack, Konnie Huq, Dave Gorman	"CGI", "Airbnb", "Rupert Murdoch's Marriage"
57. 10-4	08-06-2016	Julia Hartley-Brewer, Richard Osman, Giles Coren	"David Bowie", "Iceberg Houses", "The Great British Bake Off"
58. 10-5	15-06-2016	Lee Mack, David Baddiel, Andrew Hunter Murray	"Katie Hopkins", "Netflix", "father figures"
59. 10-6	22-06-2016	David Mitchell, Katy Brand, Sathnam Sanghera	"Self-service checkouts", "George Clooney's wedding", "Ed Miliband"

=== Series 11 ===
Episode	First broadcast	Guests	Subjects
60. 11-1	11-06-2019	Rufus Hound, Matt Johnson, Jo Brand	"People are divided about Brexit", "Women are obsessed with make up", "Jokes shouldn't be made about Obsessive–compulsive disorder"
61. 11-2	18-06-2019	Katy Brand, Richard Herring, David Mitchell	"Smoking ban", "Surviving in the wild", "The Royal Family"
62. 11-3	25-06-2019	Evelyn Mok, Andrew Hunter Murray, David Baddiel	"Eurovision", "Public apologies", "Climate change""
63. 11-4	02-07-2019	Katy Brand, Lee Mack, Josh Widdicombe	"Reunions", "Mobile phones"
64. 11-5	09-07-2019	Germaine Greer, Sathnam Sanghera, David Mitchell	"Pets", "Donald Trump's Twitter account"
65. 11-6	16-07-2019	Jo Bunting, Phil Wang, Richard Osman	"Superhero movies", "Rock stars"

=== Series 12 ===
Episode	First broadcast	Guests	Subjects
66. 12-1	25-05-2022	Desiree Burch, David Baddiel, Grayson Perry	"Feelings", "Trigger warnings", "Jane Austen"
67. 12-2	02-06-2022	Miles Jupp, David Mitchell, Baroness Sayeeda Warsi	"Being at one with nature", "Mediocrity", "Furlough schemes"
68. 12-3	08-06-2022	Richard Herring, Phil Wang, Matthew Norman	"Insects as food", "Save the date cards", "Comities"
69. 12-4	15-06-2022	Sally Phillips, Josh Widdicombe, Sathnam Sanghera	"Emoticons", "Dress codes", "Post-Covid travel"
70. 12-5	22-06-2022	Katy Brand, Phil Wang, David Mitchell	"Lockdown dogs", "Page three", "Interplanetary travel"
71. 12-6	29-06-2022	Jo Bunting, Josh Widdicombe, Alex Horne	"Competitions", "Should We Speak Ill of the Dead?", "Crypto-currency"

=== Series 13 ===
Episode	First broadcast	Guests	Subjects
72. 13-1	18-02-2025	Miles Jupp, Phil Wang, Zoe Lyons	"Weight loss", "Procrastination", "Keir Starmer's premiership"
73. 13-2	25-02-2025	Sarah Kendall, David Mitchell, Chris McCausland	"Life style programmes", "Dancing", "AI"
74. 13-3	04-03-2025	Jo Bunting, Phil Wang, David Mitchell	"Prime ministers", "Believing what you read", "Whether the grass is always greener"
75. 13-4	11-03-2025	David Baddiel, Desiree Burch, Steph McGovern	"Screen time", "Dry January", "What life would be like as a cash-free society"
76. 13-5	18-03-2025	Sir Grayson Perry, Desiree Burch, Ben Elton	"Discuss junk food", "Art", "Protesting"
77. 13-6	25-03-2025	Laura Smyth, Ignacio Lopez, Sally Phillips	"School", "Spa holidays", "Following our passions"
