= Broadcasting House (radio programme) =

- Other names: BH
- Genre: Current affairs
- Running time: 54 minutes
- Country of origin: United Kingdom
- Language: English
- Home station: BBC Radio 4
- Hosted by: Eddie Mair 1998–2003; Fi Glover 2004–2006; Paddy O'Connell 2006–present
- Edited by: Joanna Carr
- Original release: 19 April 1998
- Website: www.bbc.co.uk/bh
- Podcast: Podcast

Broadcasting House (BH) is a current affairs programme produced by BBC News for BBC Radio 4, presented by Paddy O'Connell, with Jonny Dymond regularly appearing as a relief presenter. It was launched on 19 April 1998 and is broadcast every Sunday between 9 am and 10 am.

Previously, Broadcasting House featured a weekly quiz, with a cryptic sound clue pointing to a news event in the last week. The prize was a spoon, originally a jam spoon, but then replaced by a honey spoon. The programme made frequent visits to the "BH beehive" in southwest London. The competition was nominated for a Sony Award in 2007.

More serious features include the headlines and current affairs sections, which look at the background to recent news stories. There is also a review of the Sunday papers with guest reviewers.

Broadcasting House's original presenter was Eddie Mair, who left the programme on becoming the regular sole presenter of PM in 2003. After a period with no regular presenter, Fi Glover replaced Mair at the beginning of 2004. Matthew Bannister was the first stand-in presenter when Glover went on maternity leave, but on gaining his own new obituary strand on Radio 4, Last Word, most editions of BH in the spring/summer of 2006 were presented by Working Lunch and BBC Three presenter Paddy O'Connell. Glover did not return, instead taking on the Saturday 9 am slot with Saturday Live, and on 30 August 2006, O'Connell was named as the new regular host of BH.
