= Paddy O'Connell =

English media presenter

Paddy O'Connell FRSA
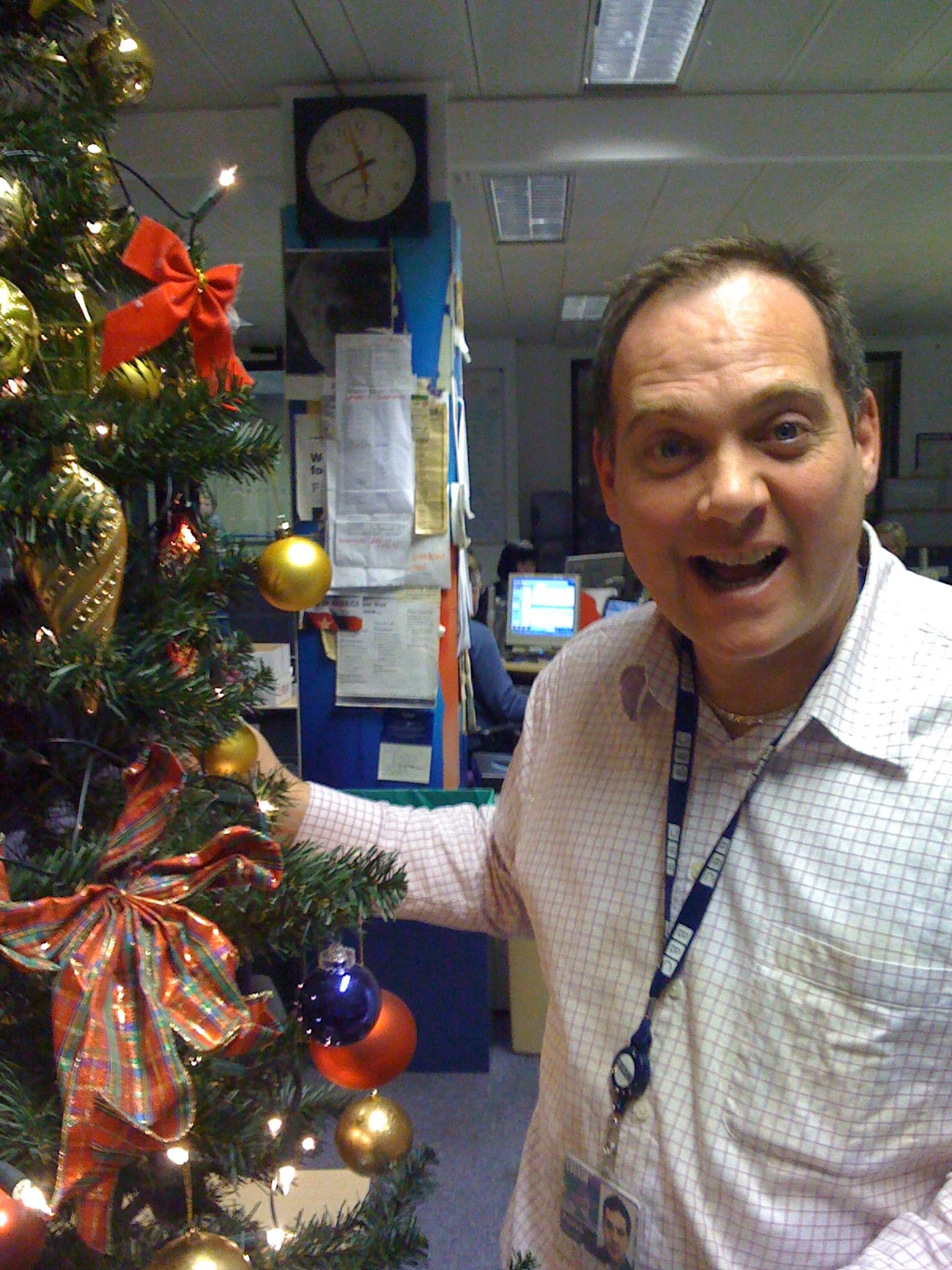
- O'Connell in 2008
- Born: Guy Patrick O'Connell; Guildford, Surrey, England
- Education: University of Aberdeen
- Occupation: Journalist
- Years active: 1989–present
- Notable credit: Broadcasting House

Guy Patrick O'Connell is an English television and radio presenter. He presents BBC Radio 4's Broadcasting House programme and Newsnight. He is also an occasional presenter of the PM programme.

== Early life and education ==
O'Connell was born in Guildford, Surrey. He was educated at Gresham's School in Norfolk and the University of Aberdeen, where he studied political science.

== Career ==
O'Connell began his broadcasting career in 1989 on the BBC's local radio trainee scheme, leading to five years spent as a BBC local radio reporter in Devon, Essex and Cleveland. He then joined BBC Radio 5 Live at its launch in 1994, before moving to the United States to present BBC World Service's programme The World. He has also presented and reported for a range of other radio stations across the world, including in Australia and Canada.

In 1997 O'Connell became BBC News's North America Business Correspondent and Wall Street anchor, based in New York City. He appeared regularly on BBC World, BBC News 24 and BBC One news bulletins, reporting on and presenting business news. Alongside Richard Quest, he was the U.S.-based anchor for the BBC's programme World Business Report on BBC World and BBC News 24.

O'Connell was in New York City at the time of the September 11, 2001, attacks, and was due to attend a meeting inside the World Trade Center on that day.

He stayed in New York for a further two years but left the United States and the BBC, in 2003. He then undertook a variety of freelance work, including for the BBC. He fronted news and entertainment shows on the corporation's youth-orientated digital channel BBC Three. He presented Celebdaq, a show based around a celebrity stock exchange, allowing O'Connell to mix his business knowledge with his interest in showbusiness. He also worked on Liquid News, replacing the late Christopher Price as its main presenter; presented the one-off Flashmob – The Opera; and was a main anchor on the BBC's offbeat evening news bulletin The 7 O'Clock News.

O'Connell was one of the main presenters on the daily BBC Two business news programme Working Lunch, and anchored the show every Friday and occasionally at other times, presenting alongside Adam Shaw or Nik Wood. He left the programme on 26 September 2008, ahead of its relaunch with new presenters. He also appeared on BBC Breakfast, presenting the programme's business news segments from the London Stock Exchange, filling in for regular business reporter Declan Curry.

He presented the weekday evening TV quiz show Battle of the Brains on BBC Two, before being replaced by Nicky Campbell.

O'Connell has been a regular presenter on the London radio station LBC 97.3.

From 2004 he commentated on the Eurovision Song Contest semi-finals on BBC Three. He also presented behind-the-scenes segments at the main final of the contest, shown on BBC Three. In 2010, O'Connell took part in a Eurovision edition of PopMaster on the Ken Bruce Show on BBC Radio 2, losing to John Kennedy O'Connor. He was again a contestant on 17 May 2013, winning the contest against Ken Bruce, with John Kennedy O'Connor as question master. On 17 March 2011, he announced via Twitter that he had been replaced as a commentator for the Eurovision semi-finals as the BBC "refreshed" its Eurovision team. He appeared in the 2011 documentary The Secret History of Eurovision.

In 2017, he appeared alongside Ken Bruce on Radio 2's coverage of the Eurovision Song Contest final and in recent years he has often been heard in conversation with Ken Bruce during Radio 2's Eurovision Song Contest coverage. In 2023, after Bruce departed from Radio 2, he was announced as part of their Eurovision lineup, hosting the two semi-finals for the station.

O'Connell presents the weekly BBC Radio 4 Sunday morning news programme, Broadcasting House. He joined the programme full-time in 2006, having previously covered for its former presenter Fi Glover while she was on maternity leave.

On an episode of Broadcasting House in March 2013 O'Connell was so moved by the journalist Emilie Blachère's reading of her poem "A Love Letter from Emilie Blachère to Rémi Ochlik" that he was unable to continue and the programme fell silent for over ten seconds. Blachère read her poem on the first anniversary of the death of her partner, the photo-journalist Rémi Ochlik, who died with the veteran war correspondent Marie Colvin during the Syrian Civil War in 2012.

In 2016 he presented a series on BBC Radio 4, Travels with Bob, in which he visited various places in Britain with his Border Terrier.

In 2023 he joined the Newscast (podcast) team, mostly at weekends alongside Laura Kuenssberg.

In November 2024 O'Connell started presenting Newsnight on BBC Two, before becoming a permanent presenter of the programme the following May. He is also an occasional presenter of the PM programme.

== Personal life ==
O'Connell is gay and is an ambassador for the charity Stonewall.
