= Adam Shaw (journalist) =

British journalist and newsreader

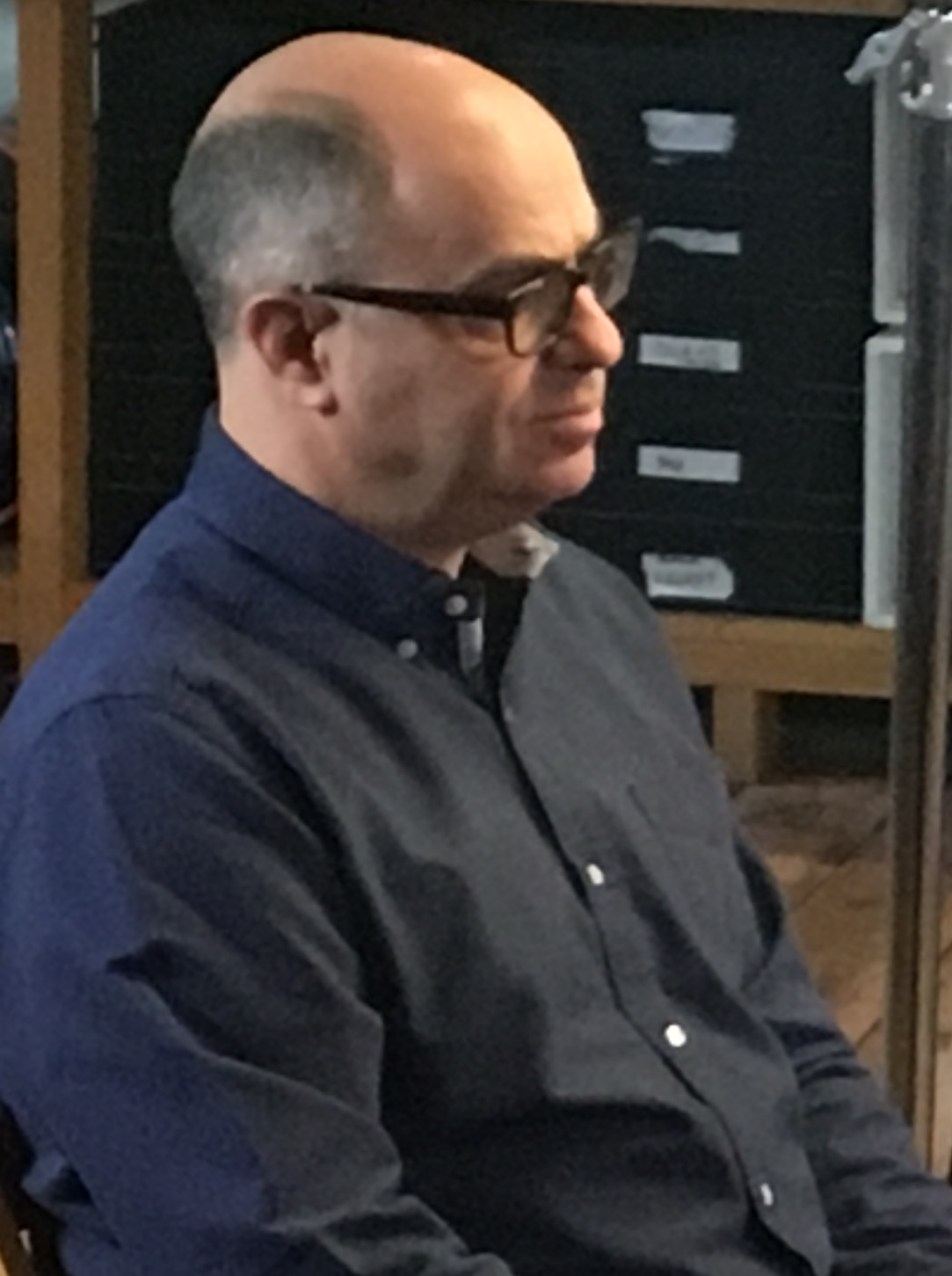
- Born: London, England, United Kingdom
- Occupations: Business journalist, presenter
- Employer(s): BBC, ITV
- Agent: Knight Ayton
- Television: Presenting: Working Lunch (1994-2008); Horizons; Drive to Buy (2012); Cook Me the Money (2013); Panorama; Tonight
- Spouse: Nicolette Shaw

Adam Shaw is a British business journalist and presenter who works for the BBC and ITV.

Shaw was educated at an inner-city comprehensive school in Kilburn, London. Until October 2008, he presented Working Lunch, BBC Two's main lunchtime economics programme. He also formerly presented Business Breakfast and World Business Report.

== Career ==
Between 1994 and 2008, Shaw presented Working Lunch, working alongside Adrian Chiles and Paddy O'Connell, among others. He was particularly well known for the Shaw's Shares segment of the programme, in which he rounded up the day's happenings on the stock market. It was announced in July 2008 that, as part of a Working Lunch relaunch, Shaw would leave the programme. He left on 26 September, and was succeeded by Declan Curry.

For three years he was the business presenter of Radio 4's Today programme. On the programme he interviewed most of the chief executives of the FTSE 100 and occasionally left the studio to do "fun" reports, such as composing a song with Guy Chambers. He has since presented Drive to Buy for ITV in late 2012 and Cook Me The Money for ITV in April 2013. He is the presenter of a BBC World News series called Horizons, which examines emerging new business ideas around the world. The first two series in 2009 and 2010 took him to over 30 different countries visiting places such as the Amazon Jungle and Inner Mongolia, as well as usual destinations such as New York City, Paris, and São Paulo. Shaw is also a regular presenter of BBC Radio 4's weekly finance programme Money Box, and also ITV's Tonight programme.
