= That Sunday Night Show =

- Genre: Panel show
- Directed by: Paul Wheeler
- Presented by: Adrian Chiles
- Country of origin: United Kingdom
- Original language: English
- No. of series: 3
- No. of episodes: 24 (list of episodes)

Production
- Executive producers: Jon Thoday; Richard Allen-Turner
- Producer: Jo Bunting
- Production location: Riverside Studios
- Production company: Avalon Television

Original release
- Network: ITV
- Release: 9 January 2011 – 12 April 2012

That Sunday Night Show is a British television chat show presented by Adrian Chiles and was first broadcast on ITV on 9 January 2011. Each episode was 30 minutes long.

In each episode, Chiles was joined by three guests who discussed the biggest news stories of the previous week and talked about the week ahead. They browsed newspapers, magazines, websites, blogs and social-networking sites for headline-grabbing events from the previous week.

ITV announced on 5 October 2012 that the show would not be commissioned for a fourth series due to poor ratings.

== Episode list ==
=== Series 1 ===
Show	Panellists	Original broadcast date
Pilot	Jon Richardson, Duncan Bannatyne, Gareth Southgate	—N/a
1	Al Murray, Pamela Stephenson, Shaun Ryder	9 January 2011
2	Frank Skinner, Margaret Mountford, Julie Hesmondhalgh	16 January 2011
3	John Prescott, Catherine Tate, Kevin Bridges	23 January 2011
4	Alastair Campbell, Jenny Eclair, Harry Redknapp	30 January 2011
5	Greg Davies, Rebecca Front, Louie Spence	6 February 2011
6	Duncan Bannatyne, Jack Dee, Natasha Kaplinsky	13 February 2011
7	Alan Sugar, Janet Street-Porter, Russell Kane	20 February 2011
8	Brian Blessed, Sophie Ellis-Bextor, Clive Anderson	27 February 2011

=== Series 2 ===
Show	Panellists	Original broadcast date
1	Frank Skinner, Kathy Burke, Shaun Ryder	25 September 2011
2	Jenny Eclair, Alan Johnson, Richard Madeley	2 October 2011
3	Al Murray, Hilary Devey, John Prescott	9 October 2011
4	Jo Brand, Jerry Hall, Ross Noble	16 October 2011
5	Clive Anderson, Margaret Mountford, Tinchy Stryder	23 October 2011
6	Louie Spence, Vic Reeves, Harry Redknapp	30 October 2011
7	Ross Kemp, Kay Burley, Ross Noble	6 November 2011

=== Series 3 ===
Show	Panellists	Original broadcast date
1	Ross Noble, Gemma Collins, Dan Stevens	8 January 2012
2	Ross Noble, Nancy Dell'Olio, Clive Anderson	15 January 2012
3	Ross Noble, Pam St. Clement, Ardal O'Hanlon	22 January 2012
4	Ross Noble, Melanie C, Heston Blumenthal	29 January 2012
5	Ross Noble, Jenny Agutter, Larry Lamb	5 February 2012
6	Ross Noble, Al Murray, Jackie Mason	12 February 2012
7	Frank Skinner, Jenny Eclair, John Prescott	19 February 2012
8	Frank Skinner, Alexandra Burke, Jon Richardson	26 February 2012
9	Frank Skinner, Denise Van Outen, Des O'Connor	4 March 2012
