= Faisal Islam =

British political and economics journalist (born 1977)

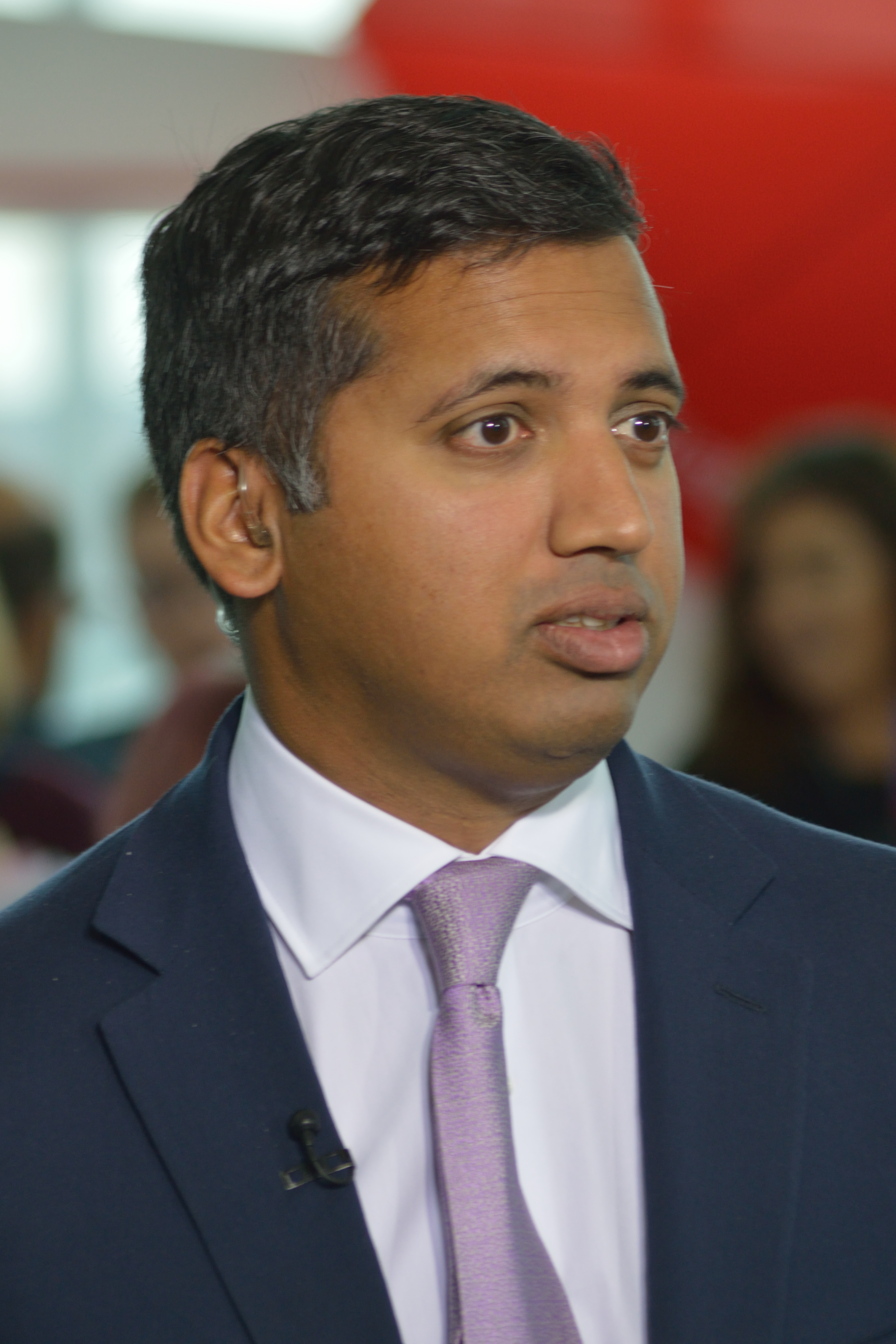
- Faisal Islam in 2016
- Born: 29 May 1977 (age 49); Manchester, England
- Education: Trinity College, Cambridge (BA); City University London (MA)
- Occupation: Economics editor
- Years active: 2004–present
- Employer: BBC News
- Notable credit(s): The Observer; Channel 4 News; Sky News

Faisal Islam (born 29 May 1977) is a British political and economics journalist who is the economics editor of BBC News and an occasional presenter of Newsnight. He served as political editor of Sky News from 2014 to 2019, and from May 2004 was business correspondent and later economics editor of Channel 4 News until June 2014.

== Early life and education ==
Born on 29 May 1977 to Bengali parents from West Bengal, India, Faisal Islam was brought up in Didsbury and Longsight. He was privately educated at Manchester Grammar School, followed by the University of Cambridge where he was an undergraduate student at Trinity College, Cambridge. In 2000, he was awarded a master's degree in newspaper journalism from City, University of London.

== Career ==
Islam was formerly an economics correspondent for The Observer newspaper. He became business correspondent for Channel 4 News in May 2004, later becoming its economics editor, a position he held until 1 June 2014, when he was replaced by Paul Mason, the programme's former culture and media editor.

Islam has reported on the ups and downs of the corporate world, from government-subsidised arms dealers and failing PFI contracts to how bankers are trading weather. Islam was named as successor to the long-serving political editor Adam Boulton of Sky News; he took up his new post before the Scottish independence referendum took place in September 2014. Boulton then presented a mid-morning news programme, All Out Politics, on the same channel.

In November 2018 it was announced that he would replace Kamal Ahmed as BBC News's economics editor, effective summer 2019. He was replaced at Sky News in his role as political editor by Beth Rigby, previously the deputy political editor.

Since 2020 Islam has occasionally presented editions of Newsnight when the show's regular presenters have been unavailable.

=== Awards and honours ===
In 2000, Islam was awarded the Wincott Award for Young Financial Journalist of the Year, and shortlisted for Young Journalist of the Year at the British Press Awards for 2001.

In February 2006, Islam was named Young Journalist of the Year at the Royal Society of Television awards.

In January 2007, Islam was the winner of the year's Broadcast News Journalism Award at the Workworld Media Awards.

In May 2009, Islam received the Wincott Foundation's award for Best Television Coverage of a Topical Issue, won particularly for his work on the growing financial problems of Icelandic banks. The judges said of the report "... here was something really new, completely convincing, with a stellar interview and free of many of the visual clichés which characterised too many financial programmes." In 2009, he was awarded the Business Journalist of the Year, as well as the BJOYA award for Best Broadcast Story – again for his report on the Icelandic banks.

In January 2010, Islam was named Broadcast News Reporter of the Year by the WorkWorld Foundation for 2009, with the judges saying "his excellent writing converts abstract economics to something accessible to all, informing viewers in a compelling and original way."

In January 2015, Islam was nominated for the Services to Media award at the British Muslim Awards.

In March 2017, he won the Royal Television Society award for the Interview of the Year for his interview with ex-Prime Minister David Cameron.

=== Articles ===
- "Stop aping the US, Gordon". New Statesman. 2 August 2002.
- "Arms subsidies cost UK jobs". The Guardian. 18 April 2008.
- "Now he's taking on the world". The Guardian. 19 September 2004.
- "The great generational robbery". New Statesman. 5 March 2007.

Media offices
Preceded by Adam Boulton	Political Editor of Sky News; 2014–2019	Succeeded by Beth Rigby
Preceded by Kamal Ahmed	Economics Editor: BBC News; 2019–present	Incumbent
