= Loose Women =

British television daytime talk show (since 1999)

- Also known as: Live Talk
- Genre: Talk show
- Created by: Diane Nelmes
- Presented by: Ruth Langsford; Kaye Adams; Christine Lampard; Charlene White
- Starring: Full list
- Music by: Patrick Duffin
- Country of origin: United Kingdom
- Original language: English
- No. of series: Loose Women: 29; Live Talk: 2

Production
- Executive producer: Emma Gormley
- Producers: Mattie Jameson (senior); Jessica Hudson (senior); Paul Pixton (senior); Michael Archibald; Helen Stuart
- Editors: Sally Shelford (editor); Ashley Jenkin (deputy); Yiljan Nevzat (deputy)
- Running time: 60 minutes (inc. adverts)
- Production companies: Granada Television (1999–2002); Anglia Television/Granada Anglia (2002–2006); ITV Studios Daytime (2006–2025); Multistory Media (2026–)

Original release
- Network: ITV
- Release: 6 September 1999 – present

Loose Women (known as Live Talk from 2000 to 2001) is a British talk show that broadcasts on ITV weekdays from 12:30 pm to 1:30 pm. The show focuses on a panel of four female presenters who talk about aspects of their lives, and discuss topical issues ranging from politics and current affairs to celebrity gossip and entertainment news. The 3,000th episode of Loose Women was broadcast on 15 May 2018. The show celebrated its 25th anniversary on 6 September 2024.

== History ==
The panel comprises four women from the entertainment and journalism industries, who interview celebrities, discuss their lives and discuss topical issues, ranging from daily politics and current affairs, to celebrity gossip.

ITV decided to scrap the original format of Loose Women and instead opted for a more condensed version of the show under the name Live Talk. This new version was filmed in Manchester instead of London and the show kept its old roots. The rebranding made its debut on 25 September 2000 and ran for 121 episodes. On 8 June 2001, Live Talk aired for the last time until 2 September 2002 when the Live Talk format and branding was scrapped and renamed Loose Women again.

On 22 June 2016, Sir Cliff Richard sat down for a one-on-one interview with close friend Gloria Hunniford for a special edition of Loose Women subtitled Sir Cliff: Out of the Shadows.

On 22 March 2020, production on Loose Women was suspended until further notice because of the COVID-19 pandemic. Reruns of old episodes were aired in the programme's time slot. Loose Women recommenced production on two live episodes per week starting on 4 May 2020.

On 22 October 2020, Loose Women had an all black panel for the first time in the show's history, featuring Charlene White, Brenda Edwards, Judi Love and Kéllé Bryan. This panel has been seen several times since then.

On 19 November 2020, there was an all male panel for the first time in the show's history, to celebrate International Men's Day, altering the show's name to Loose Men for the day. Panellists were Marvin Humes, Iain Stirling, Ronan Keating and Roman Kemp. Since then, there have been several episodes of Loose Men, with participants including Vernon Kay, Richard Madeley, Johannes Radebe, Mike Tindall and Ore Oduba.

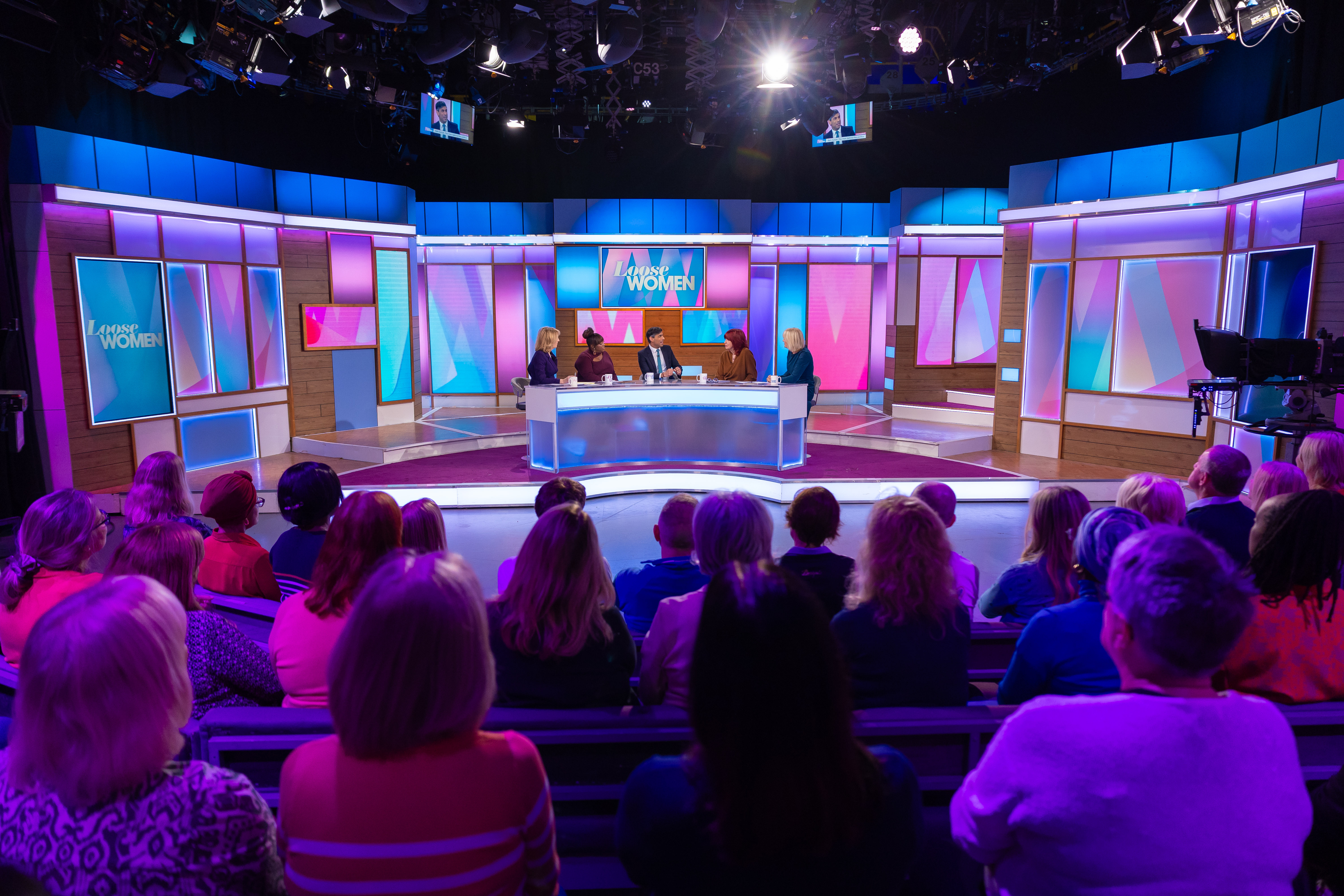
The Loose Women studio during the filming of an episode in 2024

The live studio audience returned in early September 2022, having been suspended for over two years because of the COVID-19 pandemic. The audience returned on 5 September, and new opening titles were also introduced in the same episode. Loose Women went on a live tour in September 2023.

On 6 September 2024, Loose Women launched the start of the show's Silver September Month and celebrated its 25th anniversary the same day, with panellists Kaye Adams, Linda Robson, Judi Love and Nadia Sawalha; original panellist Jane Moore joined the show from her holiday in Spain. The special guest was former panellist Jane McDonald.

Loose Women held a 25-hour "Talkathon" to mark the 25th anniversary of the show, and as part of ITV and STV's "Britain Get Talking" campaign for mental health. The "Talkathon" aired from 5 to 6 December 2024, streaming live on ITVX, with the first and last hour of the event also airing on ITV1 and STV. The "Talkathon" raised money for the mental health charities Mind, YoungMinds and Scottish Action for Mental Health, so they are able to continue to run their helplines and services.

A Loose Women podcast launched on 4 March 2025, with new episodes being released every Tuesday and Friday.

ITV's major budget cuts to its daytime lineup included Loose Women being reverted to a 30-week school-term schedule, beginning in January 2026. The show also permanently dropped the studio audience component for the same reason. Multistory Media took over production of the series at the same time, following the merger of ITV Studios Daytime into the brand. As part of the cost-cutting measures, 220 jobs were lost, with production moving from Television Centre to The H Club Studio in Covent Garden. The final broadcast from Television Centre was on 25 December 2025.

On 5 January 2026, Loose Women moved to The H Club Studio, alongside its ITV Daytime counterparts. The programme relaunched with a new set, remixed theme tune, and updated titles and graphics.

== Presenters ==
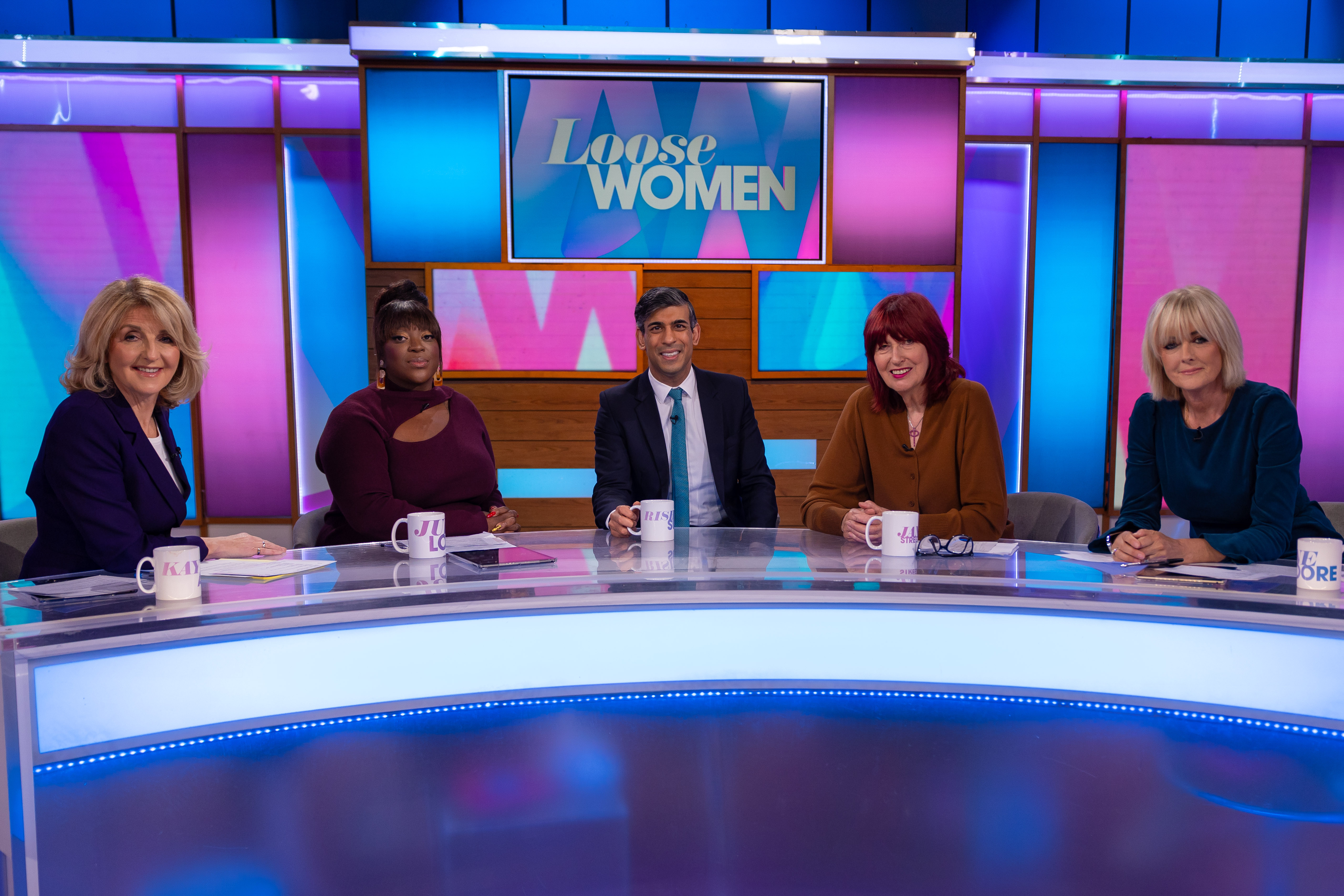
A 2024 panel of Loose Women, with Prime Minister Rishi Sunak (centre) as guest, and with panellists, Kaye Adams, Judi Love, Janet Street-Porter and Jane Moore

Kaye Adams and Nadia Sawalha were the original presenters on the show. Sawalha left in 2002, after the birth of her first child; Adams kept the role for the first ten series until the end of 2006, when she left on maternity leave. Adams, Sawalha, Jane Moore and Karren Brady were panellists for the first episode, and Ruth Langsford appeared in the second episode.

Coleen Nolan made her debut appearance in 2000, followed by Carol McGiffin. Jackie Brambles became anchor in 2006, before being replaced by Kate Thornton in 2009. Thornton was axed in 2011, and was replaced by Carol Vorderman, who left in 2014.

The panel varied from 2003 to 2013, with the core panellists being Nolan, McGiffin, Denise Welch, Sherrie Hewson, Zoë Tyler, Jane McDonald, Lisa Maxwell and Lynda Bellingham. Kerry Katona, Claire Sweeney, Jenny Powell, Josie d'Arby, Kym Marsh, Nina Wadia, Terri Dwyer, Lesley Garrett, Gillian Taylforth, Sheree Murphy, Jo Bunting, Beverley Callard and Arlene Phillips also appeared.

Nolan left in 2011, and was replaced by Sally Lindsay. Other panellists during this time included Linda Robson, Jenny Eclair and Janet Street-Porter.

Long-running panellists Carol McGiffin, Denise Welch, Jane McDonald and Lisa Maxwell departed from the programme in 2013.

Nolan, Sawalha and Moore returned as panellists during 2013, whilst Adams returned as presenter. Langsford also rejoined the programme as a presenter in 2014.

Hewson left the show, with her final episode airing on 5 September 2016.

Welch and McGiffin returned to the show after five years away, on 7 June 2018 and 5 July 2018, respectively.

On 9 May 2019, Kéllé Bryan became a panellist after appearing as a guest on 12 April 2019.

In October 2019, Linda Robson returned to the show after a twelve-month break resulting from her OCD. She returned as a panellist on 17 January 2020, after appearing as a guest on 10 January.

In February 2019, Brenda Edwards was a panellist filling in for Robson. She then became a regular panelist in March that year. Robson returned in early 2020, and Edwards stayed on, making weekly appearances.

Andrea McLean left the show after 13 years to concentrate on her new venture, membership website This Girl Is On Fire. Her last show was on 16 December 2020. Charlene White became a regular anchor presenter on the show, replacing McLean after her exit from the show in December 2020.

Saira Khan left Loose Women after five years, making her final appearance on in December 2020. She was replaced by Frankie Bridge in 2021.

In July 2021, Sunetra Sarker and Katie Piper became regular panellists on the show. In September 2022, Kelly Holmes joined the show as a regular panellist.

On 3 May 2023, Carol McGiffin was forced to leave the show because of a dispute within her contract. In August 2023, Olivia Attwood became a regular panellist. After making several guest appearances throughout 2023, Sue Cleaver became a regular panellist from 2024 onwards. Mariella Frostrup became a regular panellist in July 2024. GK Barry joined the show as a panellist in August 2024, making her the youngest panellist on the show, at the age of 25. Kerry Katona was the programme's youngest ever panellist, aged 22, when she started appearing on it in 2003.

Although not announced, Linda Robson and Kelly Holmes have not appeared on the panel since July 2025 and October 2025 respectively.

In April 2026, it was reported that Nadia Sawalha had been suspended from the programme due to anti-semitic social media posts and has subsequently taken legal action against ITV. In August 2026, Denise Welch announced she was leaving the programme to focus on her acting career, after two eight-year stints on the panel.

=== Current panellists and presenters ===
| Member | Duration | Notes | Ref. |
Presenters
| Kaye Adams | 1999–2006, 2013–present | Regular panellist and relief presenter (2016–2018); Relief panellist (2014–2015, 2019–2021); Guest panellist (2022, 2024) | |
| Ruth Langsford | 1999–2000, 2002, 2010, 2012, 2014–present | Regular panellist (1999–2000, 2002); Guest presenter (2006, 2007, 2009, 2013); Guest panellist (2019) | |
| Christine Lampard | 2016–present | Guest panellist (2016, 2019) | |
| Charlene White | 2021–present | Guest presenter (2020) | |
Panellists
| Jane Moore | 1999–2000, 2002, 2013–present | Relief presenter (2018–2025); Guest presenter (2000) | |
| Coleen Nolan | 2000–2001, 2004–2011, 2013–present | Relief presenter (2014–2025) | |
| Janet Street-Porter | 2011–present | Guest presenter (2021, 2025) | |
| Myleene Klass | 2014, 2024–present | Guest panellist (2023) | |
| Gloria Hunniford | 2014–present | Guest panellist (2003); Guest presenter (2014, 2015, 2016) | |
| Penny Lancaster | 2014–2019, 2021, 2024–present | Guest panellist (2020) | |
| Lisa Riley | 2016–2018, 2026–present | | |
| Kelly Brook | 2018, 2024–present | | |
| Brenda Edwards | 2019–present | | |
| Kéllé Bryan | 2019–present | | |
| Judi Love | 2020–present | | |
| Frankie Bridge | 2021–present | Guest panellist (2020) | |
| Sunetra Sarker | 2021–present | Guest presenter (2024, 2025) | |
| Katie Piper | 2021–present | Guest panellist (2014) | |
| Olivia Attwood | 2023–present | | |
| Sue Cleaver | 2024–present | Guest panellist (2010, 2015, 2023) | |
| Mariella Frostrup | 2024–present | | |
| GK Barry | 2024–present | | |
| Oti Mabuse | 2025–present | | |

=== Former panellists and presenters ===
| Member | Duration | Notes | Ref. |
Presenters
| Jackie Brambles | 2006–2009 | Guest panellist (2005) | |
| Carole Malone | 2007 | Guest panellist (2002, 2005) | |
| Andrea McLean | 2007–2020 | Guest panellist (2019) | |
| Kate Thornton | 2009–2011 | | |
| Carol Vorderman | 2011–2014 | Guest presenter (2010) | |
| Emma Willis | 2012–2013 | Guest presenter (2021) | |
Panellists
| Nadia Sawalha | 1999–2002, 2013–2026 | Relief presenter (2001, 2016–2021); Guest presenter (2022, 2023, 2024) | |
| Pattie Coldwell | 1999–2000 | | |
| Philippa Kennedy | 1999–2000 | | |
| Trish Adudu | 1999–2000, 2002 | | |
| Karren Brady | 1999–2002 | Guest panellist (2017) | |
| Anne Diamond | 2000, 2016–2018 | Guest presenter (2000) | |
| Emily Symons | 2000 | | |
| Kathryn Apanowicz | 2000 | | |
| Carol McGiffin | 2000–2001, 2003–2013, 2018–2023 | Guest presenter (2003, 2007) | |
| Julie Hesmondhalgh | 2001 | Guest panellist (2000) | |
| Denise Black | 2001 | Guest panellist (2003) | |
| Sally Gunnell | 2001 | | |
| Kim Hughes | 2001 | | |
| Julie Peasgood | 2001 | | |
| Rebecca Wheatley | 2002 | | |
| Lisa Rogers | 2003 | | |
| Gigi Morley | 2003 | | |
| Jacey Salles | 2003 | | |
| Kerry Katona | 2003–2004 | Guest panellist (2016) | |
| Sherrie Hewson | 2003–2016 | Guest presenter (2003); Guest panellist (2017) | |
| Claire Sweeney | 2003–2005, 2010 | Guest panellist (2012, 2016) | |
| Terri Dwyer | 2003–2006 | | |
| Jenny Powell | 2000–2001, 2004–2005 | Guest presenter (2000) | |
| Jane McDonald | 2004–2010, 2012–2013 | Guest panellist (2011, 2015) | |
| Josie D'Arby | 2004 | | |
| Lorna Luft | 2004 | | |
| Amy Lamé | 2004 | | |
| Jenni Trent Hughes | 2000–2001, 2004 | | |
| Denise Welch | 2005–2013, 2018–2026 | Guest panellist (2001, 2002); Relief presenter (2007–2008); Guest presenter (2006, 2009, 2010, 2012, 2024, 2025) | |
| Lucy-Jo Hudson | 2005 | | |
| Kym Marsh | 2005 | Guest panellist (2014, 2015, 2016) | |
| Nina Wadia | 2005–2006 | Guest panellist (2015, 2016) | |
| Sue Jenkins | 2006 | | |
| Sheree Murphy | 2006–2007 | Guest panellist (2012, 2015) | |
| Lesley Garrett | 2006, 2009–2010 | Guest panellist (2014) | |
| Gillian Taylforth | 2006, 2008 | Guest panellist (2000) | |
| Jo Bunting | 2006–2008 | | |
| Suzanne Shaw | 2007 | | |
| Lynda Bellingham | 2007–2011 | | |
| Zoë Tyler | 2007–2011 | | |
| Lisa Maxwell | 2009–2014 | | |
| Arlene Phillips | 2010 | Guest panellist (2016) | |
| Beverley Knight | 2010 | | |
| Beverley Callard | 2010 | Guest panellist (2016) | |
| Cilla Black | 2010–2011 | Guest presenter (2009); Guest panellist (2014) | |
| Sarah Millican | 2011 | | |
| Sally Lindsay | 2011–2014 | | |
| Jenny Eclair | 2011–2012 | Guest panellist (2003) | |
| Linda Robson | 2012–2018, 2020–2025 | Guest panellist (2003, 2010, 2011) | |
| Shobna Gulati | 2013–2014 | Guest panellist (2010, 2012) | |
| Jamelia | 2013–2016 | | |
| Claire Richards | 2014 | | |
| Linda Lusardi | 2014–2015 | Guest panellist (2002) | |
| Judy Finnigan | 2014–2015 | | |
| Saira Khan | 2015–2020 | Guest panellist (2015) | |
| June Sarpong | 2015–2016 | Guest presenter (2015) | |
| Anita Dobson | 2015 | | |
| Katie Price | 2015–2018 | Guest panellist (2011, 2014) | |
| Vicky Pattison | 2016 | | |
| Nadiya Hussain | 2016 | | |
| Ayda Field | 2016–2019, 2024–2025 | | |
| Martine McCutcheon | 2016–2017 | | |
| Stacey Solomon | 2016–2022 | Guest panellist (2011, 2012, 2023, 2024); Guest presenter (2021, 2022) | |
| Denise van Outen | 2017–2018 | Guest panellist (2014) | |
| Mel B | 2018 | Guest panellist (2009) | |
| Chizzy Akudolu | 2018–2019 | | |
| Rebecca Ferguson | 2019 | Guest panellist (2017, 2018) | |
| Sophie Morgan | 2021–2024 | | |
| Kelly Holmes | 2022–2025 | | |
| Joanna Page | 2023–2024 | Guest panellist (2023) | |
| Sally Dynevor | 2024 | Guest panellist (2023, 2025, 2026) | |

== Home media ==
Over the course of four years, several straight-to-DVD specials based on the series were released by ITV Studios Home Entertainment.

- Let Loose: The Very Best of Loose Women, was released in November 2008, and was a clip show that featured highlights of Series 12 and 13.
- Late Night with the Loose Women was released in November 2009, and featured a special extended "Late-Night" styled episode, featuring "raunchier" content than the main show could allow.
- Loose Women in New York: Let Loose in the City, was released on 8 November 2010. This special featured Carol McGiffin, Sherrie Hewson, Lisa Maxwell and Denise Welch going on a holiday to New York.
- Christmas with the Loose Women was released in November 2011. This was a special extended episode, presented by Andrea McLean, Carol McGiffin, Denise Welch and Lisa Maxwell.

== Merchandise ==
A range of books have been published under the brand, which has expanded to an online shop selling make-up products, champagne, personalised cups and stationery.

== Awards and nominations ==
| Date | Ceremony | Award | Status | Notes | Ref(s) |
|---|---|---|---|---|---|
| 2007 | TV Quick and TV Choice Awards | Best Daytime Show | Won | | |
| 2008 | Royal Television Society | Best Daytime Programme | Nominated | | |
| 2008 | TV Quick and TV Choice Awards | Best Daytime Programme | Won | | |
| 2009 | Television and Radio Industries Club | TV Daytime Programme award | Won | | |
| 2009 | TV Quick and TV Choice Awards | Best Daytime Programme | Won | | |
| 2009 | TV Times Awards | Favourite Programme | Won | | |
| 2010 | National Television Awards | Most Popular Factual Programme | Won | | |
| 2010 | TV Choice Awards | Best Daytime Programme | Won | | |
| 2011 | National Television Awards | Topical Magazine Programme | Nominated | | |
| 2012 | National Television Awards | Best Session | Nominated | | |
| 2016 | National Television Awards | Best Magazine Show | Nominated | | |
| 2016 | TV Choice Awards | Best Daytime Programme | Nominated | | |
| 2017 | Diversity in Media Awards | TV Moment of the Year | Nominated | | |
| 2017 | National Television Awards | Best Live Magazine Show | Nominated | | |
| 2018 | National Television Awards | Best Daytime Show | Nominated | | |
| 2018 | TRIC Awards | Daytime Programme | Nominated | | |
| 2020 | National Television Awards | Live Magazine Show | Nominated | | |
| 2021 | Royal Television Society | Best Daytime Programme | Won | For the first all black panel | |
| 2021 | National Television Awards | Daytime Programme | Nominated | | |
