= The Listening Project =

- Running time: Various
- Country of origin: United Kingdom
- Language: English
- Home station: BBC Radio 4
- Hosted by: Fi Glover
- Original release: 30 March 2012 – 27 September 2022
- Website: The Listening Project

The Listening Project is a programme broadcast on BBC Radio 4 between 2012 and 2022, introduced by Fi Glover. The programme was a joint project between BBC Radio 4, BBC Local Radio stations and the British Library, which records conversations between friends, colleagues or relatives with the aim to preserve voices and experiences from the United Kingdom to "build a unique picture of our lives today". Over one thousand recordings have been made as of 2020, and they will be archived by the British Library for preservation.

Examples of conversations recorded for the Listening Project

The Listening Project aired a conversation in April 2022 between Pedro and Caroline, talking about how they are coping with the rising cost of living – with a particular focus on food. Pedro explains how he gets food from his local Community Fridge and also volunteers there, and Caroline is getting food from her local food bank. The programme was aired on BBC Radio 4 on 10 April 2022.

In 2020, the BBC Listening Project aired the episode Mark and Darren- Strangers in Conversation, as an extended length episode. Palliative care consultant Mark Taubert and Darren Bradbury only knew each other from Mark's visits to the Llandough hospital café, where Darren works. They had never had a full conversation before this day, and talk about diverse topics like Brexit, witnessing grief in hospitals, and the health of Darren's daughter who has a rare eye condition.

Another example is a conversation between Ken and Peter, talking about the pain of their respective divorces. They acknowledge the difficulty they had in talking about their problems. It was aired in October 2018.
