= Mark Taubert =

British-German palliative care doctor and campaigner

Mark Taubert FRCP FRCGP FLSW
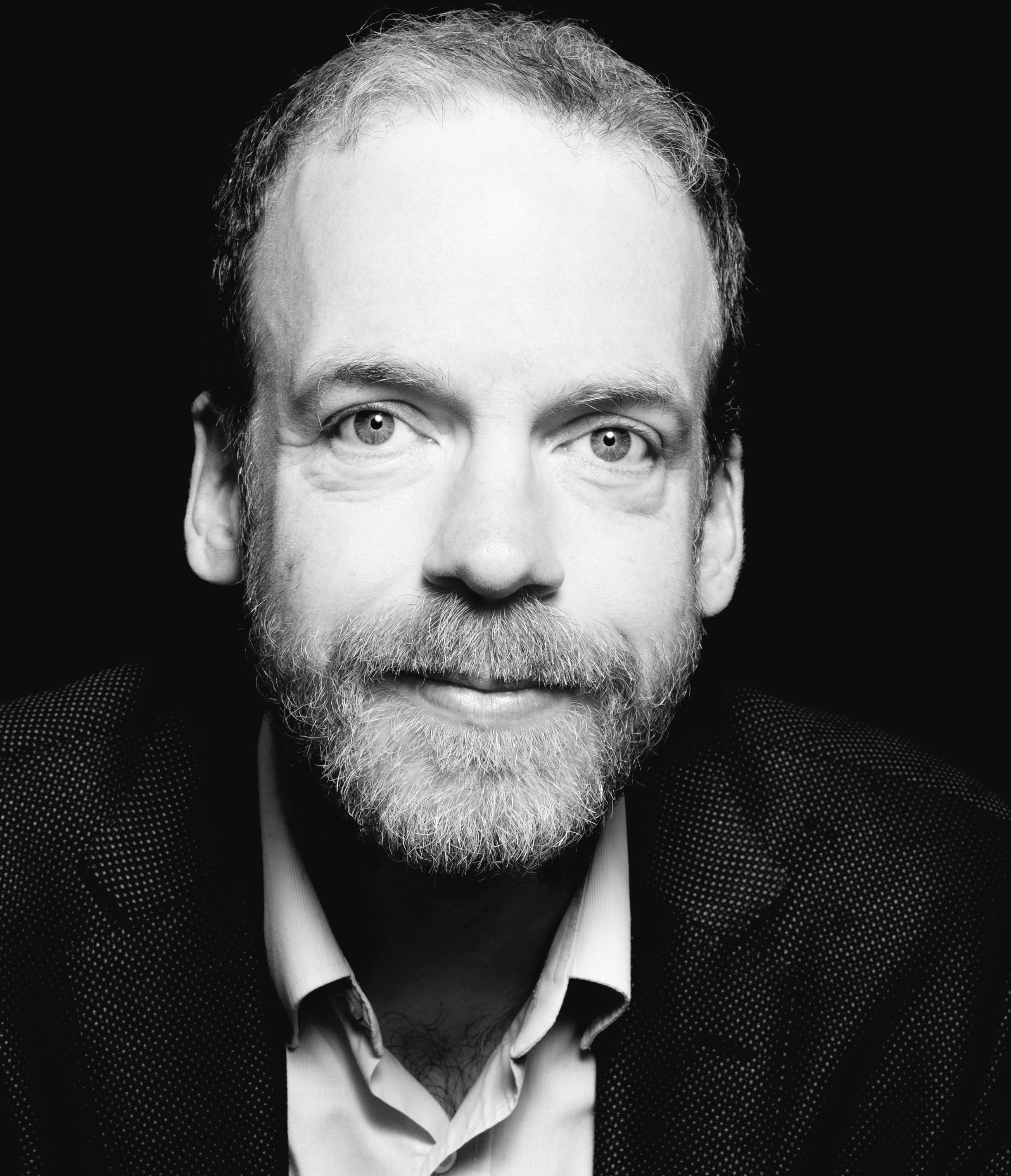
- Born: Hessen, Germany
- Education: University of Dundee
- Occupation: Consultant Physician
- Known for: TEDx Talk "Why language matters when you are dying"
- Notable work: Talk CPR Learning and Education Resources "TalkCPR"
- Website: Cardiff University Staff Profiles "Prof Mark Taubert"

Mark Taubert is a German-British consultant doctor and professor of medicine at Cardiff University. He is a palliative care physician in Wales, who according to the Western Mail and Welsh Government website has contributed significantly to the development of his specialty, and has received recognition as a doctor and campaigner, nationally and internationally.

He wrote to the late David Bowie in January 2016 about a conversation he held with a dying patient, a letter that was shared across the world.

He is founder of TalkCPR, an international information campaign about cardiopulmonary resuscitation and do not attempt cardiopulmonary resuscitation decisions. He is national chair of the Advance & Future Care Strategy Group for the NHS Wales Executive.

== Media work ==
He has authored articles on medical topics and palliative care in international newspapers such as the Washington Post and the Guardian. Taubert founded Talk CPR, an international information campaign that discusses do not attempt cardiopulmonary resuscitation decisions, also known by the acronym DNACPR. His explanatory Talk CPR resources have been viewed over a million times worldwide, and he has been interviewed and spoken about the topic on BBC News at Six and BBC News at 10.

Taubert has delivered a TEDx talk on the use of language in palliative care. He has also featured on two palliative care themed recordings for the UK's BBC Listening Project in 2019 and 2020 and on BBC Horizon's 'We need to talk about Death' with Kevin Fong.

== Awards ==
He has won national and international awards for his teaching and clinical work, including a Bafta award as part of a care team featured in an ITV documentary. He received the prestigious national BMJ/BMA Clinical Teacher of the year award, the Best Trainer Award Wales 2016 and the Royal College of Physicians Excellence in Patient Care Award.

In 2014, he was elected to become a Fellow of the Learned Society of Wales.

== Open letter to David Bowie ==
In 2016, he published a thank you letter to David Bowie after the singer's death, with reference to Bowie's last album, Blackstar. The letter was initially published in the British Medical Journal and then the Independent Newspaper and was shared by David Bowie's son Duncan Jones. It went viral online and in worldwide newsrooms. It was subsequently read out by actor Benedict Cumberbatch and singer Jarvis Cocker at public events. The letter addresses issues such as palliative care and planning for the end of life. Bowie's story became a way to communicate important aspects of dying with a palliative care patient.

The letter was turned into a classical music string quartet composition for BBC Radio 3, featuring Taubert reading the letter. It toured, premiering at the Royal Northern College of Music and the Royal Conservatoire of Scotland. According to the Herald Newspaper Scotland it 'sound tracked a reading of an open letter to David Bowie by palliative care doctor Mark Taubert, which has been a celebrated part of the marking of the passing of the rock star, played here on the fourth anniversary of his death.'

The open letter has also been printed in several books, including Dylan Jones' David Bowie- A Life and Letters of Note - Music by Shaun Usher, part of the Letters Live event brand, where the letter was read out twice.
