= Cook Me the Money =

British television programme

- Genre: Cooking
- Presented by: Adam Shaw
- Theme music composer: David Lowe
- Country of origin: United Kingdom
- Original language: English
- No. of series: 1
- No. of episodes: 10

Production
- Running time: 60mins (inc. adverts)
- Production company: Shiver Productions

Original release
- Network: ITV
- Release: 1 April – 12 April 2013

Related
- ITV Food

Cook Me the Money is a British daytime television programme on ITV as part of ITV Food presented by Adam Shaw and produced by Shiver Productions.

Each episode sees three teams of amateur chefs creating, and selling a dish of their choice. They must create a pop-up business by selling their dish to paying customers. They have £100 and fifteen minutes to spend on shopping for their ingredients, followed by one hour to make the dish and set the price. The winning team takes all of their own profit and the earnings from the other teams, home. The show is split up into three sections, the first section is meeting the teams, the second is watching the teams shop, and the last section of the show is watching the teams cook and decide a price for the dish they made.
