= Eddie Mair =

Scottish broadcaster

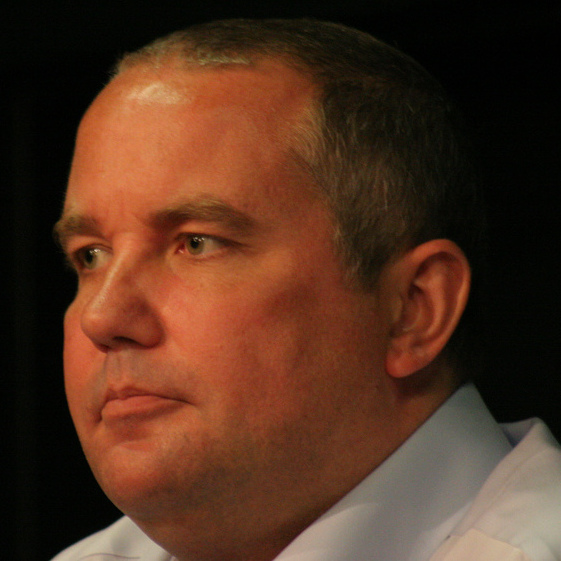
- Mair in 2009
- Born: 12 November 1965 (age 60); Dundee, Scotland
- Occupations: Journalist, presenter, political commentator
- Notable credit(s): PM; The World; Eddie Mair Live; The Andrew Marr Show; Newsnight'; LBC
- Partner: Paul Kerley

Eddie Mair (born 12 November 1965) is a Scottish former broadcaster who was a presenter on BBC radio and television. He hosted BBC Radio 4's daily news magazine PM from 2003 to 2018, and also presented companion Saturday show iPM, as well as intermittently presenting Any Questions? as a substitute for Jonathan Dimbleby. Primarily a radio presenter, he had occasional stints working for BBC television as a stand-in presenter on Newsnight, and on The Andrew Marr Show in 2013 following Marr's stroke. Mair left the BBC in August 2018, having worked for the corporation for over 30 years. He went on to present a drive time programme on LBC every weekday from September 2018 until August 2022, after which he retired from broadcasting.

== Early life ==
Mair was born in Dundee. His amateur broadcasting career is reported to have started by using the public address system in his former school, Whitfield High in Dundee.

== Career ==
Mair's professional career began after he rejected a university place in order to present on Radio Tay, a local Dundee station.

Mair joined the BBC in 1987 as a sub-editor for Radio Scotland. He moved on to present Good Morning Scotland and Reporting Scotland, then Eddie Mair Live in the mid-morning slot for Radio Scotland. In 1993, he hosted Breakaway, the weekly 'travel and leisure' programme on BBC Radio 4. He then joined BBC Radio 5 Live when it began in 1994 presenting the Midday with Mair news show. From 1996 to 2000, he presented the BBC/PRI programme The World.

Mair was the host of the Sunday current affairs programme Broadcasting House from its launch in April 1998, until 2003, when he took over PM and Fi Glover became presenter of the weekly show. On both programmes, Mair mixed serious journalism with witty and satirical commentary. After reading out the weather forecast, he would invariably encourage listeners with a jaunty "Do wrap up", whether the forecast was cold or warm.

After Nick Clarke died in 2006, Mair substituted for Jonathan Dimbleby as the presenter of Any Questions?. Standing in for Andrew Marr on his Sunday morning show on 24 March 2013, Mair interviewed London Mayor Boris Johnson asking critical questions about past known misdeeds such as lying to a minister and commenting: "you're a nasty piece of work". Patrick Wintour in The Guardian commented that "Johnson's reputation had taken a severe pounding", while Dan Hodges in his Telegraph blog thought Mair's approach was a "disgrace". Johnson himself said that Mair had done a "splendid job".

Mair has also presented Newsnight on BBC Two and The 7 O'Clock News on BBC Three.

On PM, Mair had a long-running, on-air feud – real or simulated – with Robert Peston, the BBC's former Economics Editor. For leap day in 2012, Peston co-hosted the PM programme with Mair, and, in 2015, they co-hosted the show "The Robert Peston Interview Show (With Eddie Mair)"

Mair was the original host of the 2003 BBC Two series Time Commanders. From 27 to 30 October 2014, Mair guest-presented four editions of The One Show with Alex Jones on BBC One.

On 29 February 2016, to the accompaniment of Nat King Cole playing Let There Be Love, Valerie Singleton proposed marriage to Mair live on Radio 4's PM programme, in-line with the tradition that women may propose marriage on one day only – 29 February. In the same spirit of gentle humour, he promised to think about it and give her an answer in 2020.

Mair's BBC earnings were between £300,000 and £350,000 for the 2016-17 financial year. The Guardian reported that he refused to take an earnings cut as part of the BBC's gender-equality adjustments made in 2017 and 2018. Mair denied this, writing in Radio Times, "None of my thinking has been influenced by the BBC's pay problems. I'd offered, in writing, to take a cut. It tickled me to read sometimes that I was apparently refusing. The first article appeared before we'd even discussed pay, and later it was said I was staying off work in some kind of protest: in fact, as RT [Radio Times] readers know, I was in hospital trying to avoid sepsis." His autobiography A Good Face for Radio : Confessions of a Radio Head was first published in 2017.

Mair was also the initial presenter of the BBC's podcast about the Grenfell Tower Inquiry, up until part 113 of the podcast, which concluded with part 204: The Phase 2 Report and the End of the Inquiry about the fire in Grenfell Tower in London, in September 2024. Starting from part 114, Mair was no longer presenting this podcast, handing over to Kate Lamble, the then producer of the podcast series.

On 1 July 2018, Mair announced that he would depart the BBC, presenting his last PM show on 17 August 2018. On the following day it was announced that Mair would be joining LBC, and that his first show for the station would be broadcast in September 2018. In fact, Mair presented his final PM show on 8 August 2018, although he did not acknowledge this during the broadcast. The next day, Mair emailed the PM team to say:

"[...] I want to tell you about what happened just after PM finished last night. As you may know, we finished the show with a full rendition by Willie Nelson of 'Bring Me Sunshine'. It was, in keeping with the tradition of PM, a suggestion by a listener. Making the show yesterday had been tortuous for everyone on a quiet news day but in the end, I think we made something pretty good. Eloise and I looked at each other after the meeting and agreed that there was no way to match that for a last Eddie programme. So, that's what it was...my last PM. It felt right then and it feels right now. No fuss or faff, just as I wanted. Genuinely unplanned, and with its origins in a listener idea. Perfect. Or as close to perfect as we're likely to get. I hate saying goodboo. Sorry...goodbee. No...goodbiy. Dammit. I still can't say it."

In August 2018 it was announced Mair was to take over the drivetime show on LBC from Iain Dale after he moved to evenings in a new autumn schedule for the station. On 3 September 2018, he started to present the show, Monday – Friday 4–6pm.

On 24 March 2022, Mair announced his intention to retire from LBC that coming August. He presented his last LBC show on 18 August 2022.

== Awards ==
In 2005, Mair won the News Journalist award at the Sony Radio Academy Awards. He has also won a Sony Award for Speech Broadcaster of the Year, one for Best Breakfast Show, and was nominated for two Sony awards for Midday with Mair on 5 Live.

In 2012, Eddie won a Gold award at the Sony Radio Academy Awards for his interview with Julie Nicholson, who lost her daughter Jenny in the London bombings of 7 July 2005. The PM programme also won a Gold award the same year for its coverage of Hosni Mubarak's resignation as president of Egypt.

Mair was listed as the fifth most powerful person in British radio in a 2005 poll in the Radio Times, and 28th most influential LGBT person in The Independent on Sunday's Pink List 2013.
