= Kamal Ahmed (British journalist) =

British journalist

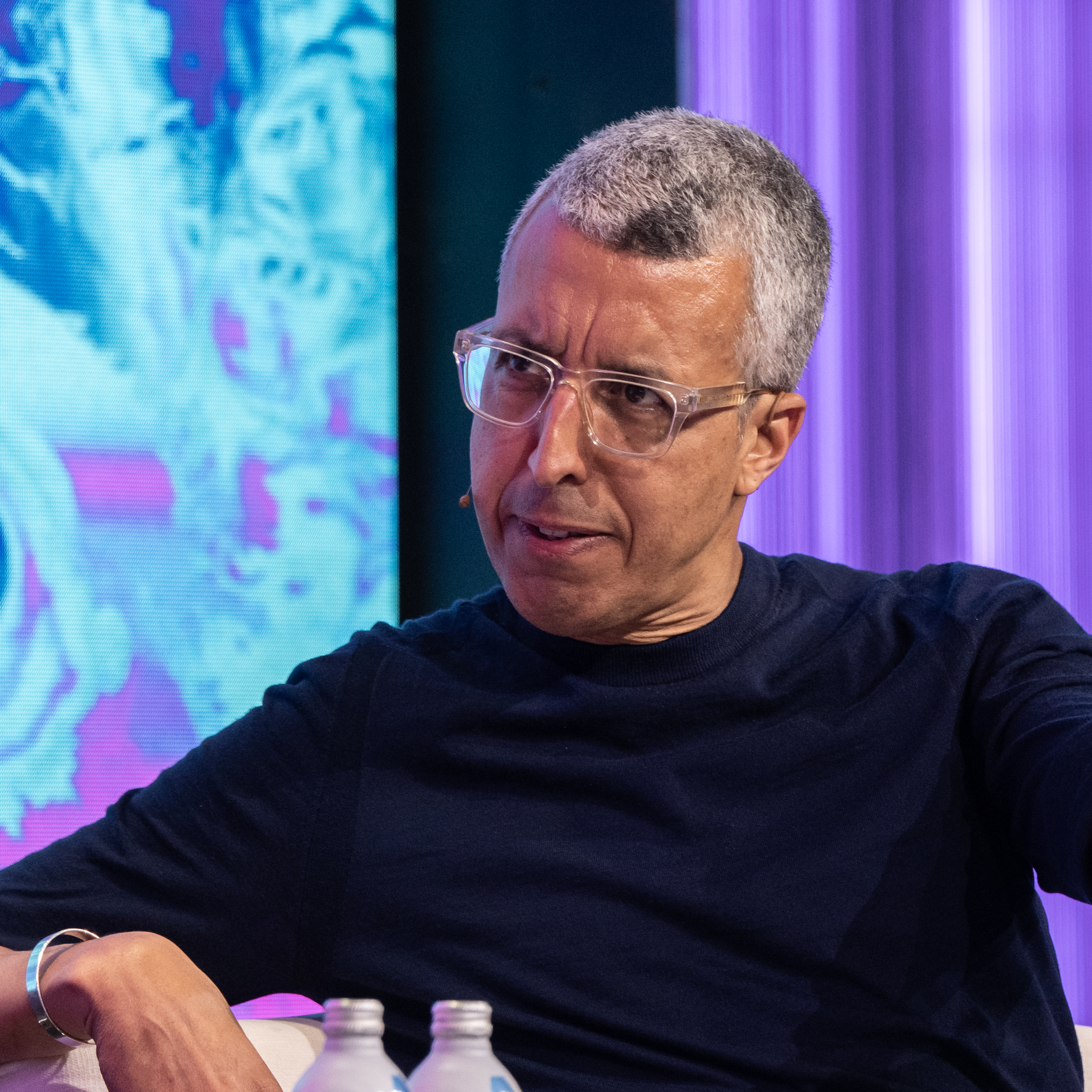
- At SXSW London, June 2026
- Born: Kamal Ahmed; 15 November 1967 (age 58); Ealing, London, England
- Education: Drayton Manor High School; University of Leeds; City University Department of Journalism
- Occupations: Journalist, editor, administrator
- Employer: BBC
- Title: Economics Editor of BBC News (2016–2018); Business Editor of BBC News (2014–2016); Editorial Director of BBC News (2018–2021)
- Spouse: Gemma Curtin (divorced) Elizabeth Day (m. 2011; div. 2015)
- Awards: CFA Society UK's ethical and professional standards award 2013

Kamal Ahmed (born 15 November 1967) is a British journalist, who was Editorial Director of BBC News. He was Economics Editor at the BBC until November 2018, and Business Editor from March 2014, until Simon Jack was appointed as his successor in February 2016.

Ahmed was formerly the political editor of The Observer, business editor of The Sunday Telegraph and Director of Communications at the Equality and Human Rights Commission.

== Early life and education ==
Ahmed is the son of an English mother from Rotherham and a Sudanese father who was a research scientist in ophthalmology. He grew up in Ealing. From 1980 to 1986, Ahmed was educated at Drayton Manor High School, a state comprehensive school in Hanwell in the London Borough of Ealing in West London, followed by the University of Leeds, from which he graduated in 1990 with a degree in political studies. He then trained in journalism at the City University Department of Journalism.

== Career ==
Ahmed worked on local newspapers in Scotland before joining Scotland on Sunday in 1993. He later moved to The Guardian and became executive news editor and political editor at The Observer newspaper. Ahmed was later criticised by fellow journalist Nick Davies for maintaining an inappropriately close relationship with Downing Street while serving as political editor, and for publishing numerous articles that "contained significant falsehood or distortion". Ahmed described Davies' claims as untrue and "hearsay". After leaving the newspaper, he then became group Director of Communications at the Equality and Human Rights Commission, recruited by its then chairman Trevor Phillips.

In 2009, Ahmed was appointed business editor for The Sunday Telegraph, undertaking a course at the London Business School before replacing Mark Kleinman, who left for Sky News. In 2013 he became executive business editor, with a role across the Sunday and Daily Telegraph print editions.

On 20 December 2013, it was announced that Ahmed would replace Robert Peston as the business editor of BBC News, and on 24 March 2014 he assumed the post.

On 3 December 2015, after Peston's departure to ITV, it was announced that Ahmed would replace him as the BBC economics editor, with his successor as business editor of BBC News would be announced early in 2016.

On 30 July 2018, Ahmed was announced as BBC News's Editorial Director, with Faisal Islam replacing him in his previous role. In November 2020 at a virtual ceremony, Ahmed was announced as one of the United Kingdom's most influential people of African or African Caribbean heritage by being included in the 2021 edition of the annual Powerlist.

In February 2021, the BBC announced that Ahmed, along with seven others, had been made redundant. "I would like to thank them for their outstanding contribution to BBC News to date and we are exploring future options for them," said Fran Unsworth, Director of News, in an email to BBC staff. "Change is never easy but it is important to have this new structure in place." This now means they have no BAME representation on the News board.

In May 2021, it was reported that Ahmed joined former Dow Jones CEO William Lewis in founding the News Movement, a digital news company aiming to counter misinformation. Ahmed was its Editor-in-Chief. In 2024, Ahmed left to become The Telegraph's director of audio, and co-host of The Daily T podcast with Camilla Tominey. He left The Telegraph in June 2025.

== Personal life ==
Ahmed has two children from his first marriage to Gemma Curtin. He later married the journalist and novelist Elizabeth Day in December 2011. The couple separated in February 2015 and later divorced.

Media offices
Preceded by Robert Peston	Business Editor: BBC News; 2014–2016	Succeeded by Simon Jack
Preceded by Robert Peston	Economics Editor: BBC News; 2016–2018	Succeeded by Faisal Islam
Position established	Editorial Director: BBC News; 2018–2021	Position abolished
