= Drayton Manor High School =

Academy school in Hanwell, west London, England

Location
- Drayton Bridge Road; London, W7 1EU; England; 51.5158°N 0.3362°W

Information
- Former names: Drayton Manor Grammar school
- Type: Academy
- Motto: Nec Aspera Terrent ("Hardships do not deter us")
- Established: 1930
- Department for Education URN: 137221 Tables
- Ofsted: Reports
- Head teacher: Lisa Mills
- Gender: Coeducational
- Age: 11 to 18
- Enrolment: 1490
- Language: English
- Website: www.draytonmanorhighschool.co.uk

Drayton Manor High School, formerly Drayton Manor Grammar School, is an academy school located in Hanwell, West London, England.

== History ==
=== Grammar school ===
Drayton Manor High School was founded in 1930 as a county grammar school serving local children.

=== Second World War ===
The school and Greenford County School (now Greenford High School) together were evacuated to Torquay in Devon in late October 1940. Ealing was being increasingly heavily bombed. The Greenford headteacher was Mr JW Withrington. From October 1941 the two schools were taught together at Audley Park School, now Torquay Academy.

St Olave's Grammar School had also been evacuated to Torquay, at Torquay Boys' Grammar School and South Devon Technical College from September 1939.

=== Comprehensive ===
With the reorganisation of schools in the London Borough of Ealing and abolition of the tripartite system, Drayton Manor received its first intake in 1975, and changed its name to reflect this change in status.

It was awarded Beacon status in 2000 and received the School Achievement Award for Excellence for three consecutive years. In the 2012 Ofsted inspection report, the school was rated outstanding.

On 28 October 2008, Drayton Manor High School challenged a ruling in the High Court. Ealing London Borough Council accused the school of discriminating against children living in areas of poverty by only admitting those who lived close to the school.

The school was granted academy status in August 2011.

== Notable alumni ==
- Kamal Ahmed, journalist
- The Brand New Heavies, a music ensemble
- Vernon Coaker, life peer and former Labour MP for Gedling
- Peter Crouch, footballer
- Alan Mehdizadeh, actor
- Holly Earl, actress
- Adebayo Bolaji, artist
- The Revd Professor Paul Fiddes, DD, theologian
- Sir Michael Fox, Lord Justice of Appeal
- Martin Hancock, actor
- Ellie Harrison, artist
- Shaparak "Shappi" Khorsandi, comedian
- Stephen Kinnock, politician
- Steve McQueen, artist and film director
- Charles Palmer OBE, President of the International Judo Federation from 1965–79
- John Pencavel, economist
- Rick Wakeman, rock musician

== Head teachers ==
- Christopher Everest (past Head Teacher)
- Sir Pritpal Singh (past Head Teacher, September 1994 – December 2019)
- Miss Lisa Mills (current Head Teacher, 1 Jan 2020 – present)
