= Jo Bunting =

British producer and writer

Jo Bunting is a British television and radio producer and writer, currently series producer on Have I Got News For You and executive producer and writer of Channel 4's The Great British Bake Off: An Extra Slice.

She has been a regular guest interviewer on BBC Radio 4's Loose Ends and has been a panellist on a number of other radio shows, including Radio 4's Heresy. She was a recurring panellist on Loose Women (2006–2008). Bunting has produced That Sunday Night Show (2011–2012) for ITV; and reviewed the newspapers on ITV's This Morning in 2012. In July 2018, she began writing and presenting a new topical comedy show on Radio 4, Where's the F in News.
