= Saturday Live (radio series) =

BBC radio programme

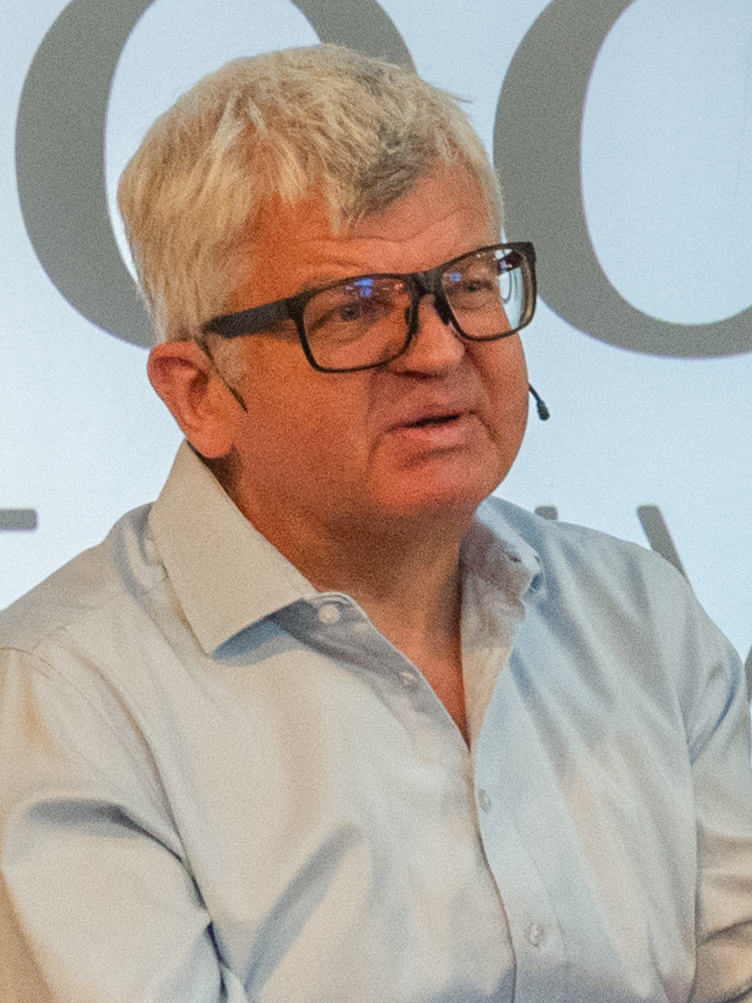
- Host Adrian Chiles (in 2024)
- Genre: Magazine; Discussion
- Running time: 1 hour (90 mins from May 2012 to March 2023)
- Country of origin: UK
- Language: English
- Home station: BBC Radio 4
- Hosted by: Fi Glover (2006–2011); Richard Coles (2010–2023); Aasmah Mir (2012–2020); Nikki Bedi (2020–2025); Adrian Chiles (2025–present)
- Recording studio: Cardiff
- Original release: 16 September 2006

Saturday Live is a BBC Radio 4 magazine programme, first broadcast on 16 September 2006. It combines contributions from studio guests with real-life stories and short features, as well as the musical segment known as "Inheritance Tracks", in which famous people share memories about two music tracks, one that they consider they inherited from a previous generation and one they would recommend to future generations. Since 2013, following the example of a particular listener experience that resonated with the audience, it has featured a segment called "Thank You", consisting of voice messages from listeners who received acts of kindness from those strangers who were not, or could not be, thanked properly at the time. These messages sometimes refer to accidents, or amusing incidents, that happened decades earlier, and occasionally the kind stranger is found, and their response is then also shared.

Adrian Chiles took over as the sole presenter from September 2025. The programme was previously presented by Nikki Bedi with a co-presenter roster including Peter Curran, Huw Stephens, Olly Mann, Jon Kay and Greg James. Previous presenters include Rev. Richard Coles, Aasmah Mir, Fi Glover, Sian Williams, and J. P. Devlin (2006–2019), who in 2015 stated on-air, as the only remaining member of the presentation team from the first programme, that he had "...seen out two Radio 4 Controllers, four Director Generals and, get this, eighteen Saturday Live presenters...". Saturday Live is broadcast live between 9.00 and 10.00 on Saturday mornings (UK time) and is available world-wide on demand in the form of an extensive on-line archive that includes streaming, download and podcast formats. According to presenter Richard Coles, at the end of 2014 there were more than 1.8 million weekly listeners and according to Poppy North of C. Hurst & Co. on 30 April 2019 there were 2.4 million.

In May 2008 the programme, then presented by Fi Glover, was named Best UK Speech Programme at the annual Sony Radio Academy Awards. In February 2011, however, it was highlighted by the journalist and newscaster Alastair Stewart as "unfunny, self-indulgent, contrived and, worst of all, twee" and therefore unworthy, in his opinion, of a slot in the Radio 4 schedule. In May 2012, the duration of Saturday Live was increased from 60 to 90 minutes by being extended into the time-slot formerly occupied by the travel programme Excess Baggage.

The programme's original introductory theme music was taken from various instrumental sections of "Steady, As She Goes" by The Raconteurs. It has subsequently varied from week to week, with a closing track chosen by one of the guests.

Aasmah Mir announced on air during the show of 25 April 2020 that it was her last appearance on the show. She left to join the new Times Radio station as a breakfast presenter. In December 2020, it was announced that Richard Coles' new co-host would be the broadcaster Nikki Bedi.

On 25 March 2023, Richard Coles co-presented the programme for the last time after 12 years as a regular presenter, as a result of its production moving as from the following week from London to BBC Cymru Wales New Broadcasting House in Cardiff, with one of his guests being former co-presenter Dr Sian Williams. The programme was also to be reduced from 90 to its original 60 minutes.
