= Declan Curry =

Northern Irish journalist

- Born: Declan Gerald Curry; 5 September 1971 (age 54); Strabane, County Tyrone, Northern Ireland
- Occupations: Journalist, news presenter, businessman
- Years active: 1990–present
- Notable credit(s): BBC Breakfast; On The Money (BBC 5Live, Sunday evening)

Declan Gerald Curry (born 5 September 1971) is a Northern Irish freelance journalist, news presenter and businessman. He is the former business correspondent for BBC Breakfast.

== Early life ==
Curry was born and raised in Strabane, County Tyrone, Northern Ireland.

== Career ==
=== Early career ===
Curry studied chemistry at Imperial College, London. There he reported for IC Radio and ICNN (Imperial College News Network), as well as the weekly paper Felix.

Curry has worked for and broadcast on ABC News and LBC, but has spent most of his career with the BBC.

=== BBC ===
Curry started working for the BBC in 1994. He worked on the BBC News Channel from the channel's inception in 1997. He has also worked for BBC World News, Radio 5 Live, and Radio 4. Curry reported on events in the London Stock Exchange and other British economic news during the Breakfast programme on BBC One and BBC News Channel.

On 23 May 2005, Curry did not participate in a staff strike against announced pay cuts. He justified his stance by commenting: "I don't support the strike at all. The management have made a very strong case in my view as to why these cuts are necessary. It's other people's money that we are spending and we have to use it as wisely as we can."

On 6 October 2008, Curry began a new role as presenter of BBC Two's Working Lunch, alongside Naga Munchetty, replacing the previous team headed by Adrian Chiles and Adam Shaw. After the programme ended in July 2010 Curry was a regular host of Your Money on the BBC News Channel on Saturday mornings until August 2014.

Curry introduced the business and finance reports on Radio 5 Live's Drive programme, and has also presented the programme on occasions.

From 5 September 2010, Curry presented On the Money, a Sunday evening business programme on Radio 5 Live, and later hosting the business debate programme Show Me The Money on the News Channel, also on Sunday evening at 21.30.

At the end of summer 2014, Curry, who has been freelance for many years, decided to stop making long term programmes for the BBC. He now concentrates on print journalism, public speaking and acting as a business conference chair. He also presents business news for LBC and LBC News.

== Awards ==
On 6 July 2009, Curry was awarded an honorary degree from Middlesex University.
