= Working Lunch =

Television programme

- Titles used 6 October 2008 – 30 July 2010
- Genre: Financial news
- Created by: BBC
- Presented by: Adrian Chiles (1994–2007); Adam Shaw (1994–2008); Paddy O'Connell (2003–2008); Nik Wood (2007-2008); Declan Curry (2008–2010); Naga Munchetty (2008–2010)
- Composer: John Ashton Thomas
- Country of origin: United Kingdom
- Original language: English

Production
- Production locations: Studio TC7, BBC Television Centre, London
- Running time: 30 minutes

Original release
- Network: BBC Two
- Release: 19 September 1994 – 30 July 2010

Working Lunch is a television programme which was broadcast on BBC Two covering business, personal finance and consumer news; it was broadcast between 1994 and 2010. The programme was first aired on 19 September 1994. It had a quirky, relaxed style, especially when compared to other BBC business shows such as World Business Report. In April 2010, the BBC announced that the programme was being cancelled at the end of July 2010. GMT with George Alagiah took its place in the schedule at 12:30 on BBC Two.

== Presenters and reporters ==
Originally, the show was presented by Adrian Chiles and Adam Shaw. Chiles left the programme on 26 January 2007 after 12 1/2 years, to become the co-host of the BBC One current affairs and lifestyle programme The One Show. He was replaced by Nik Wood. On Fridays, Paddy O'Connell fronted the show with Shaw instead of Wood. Both O'Connell and Shaw bowed out on 26 September 2008.

In 2007, former footballer Graeme Le Saux presented a series of items recorded in his birthplace of Jersey. Jenny Culshaw, a senior producer on the show, also occasionally presented items.

Other members of the Working Lunch team included Rachel Burden, Simon Gompertz, Rachel Horne, Rob Pittam and Gillian Lacey-Solymar.

From 6 October 2008, a revamped lineup saw BBC Breakfast's former business presenter, Declan Curry, and Naga Munchetty take over studio presentation, with Wood returning to his former role of roving reporter, alongside Rob Pittam.

Gillian Lacey-Solymar left the show on 29 January 2010.

The show had a regular cast of experts like Justin Urquhart Stewart.

== 2008 relaunch ==
The show was relaunched on 6 October 2008, with new titles, set and presenters. The familiar goldfish and shark were replaced by a piggy bank. Presenters Paddy O'Connell, Adam Shaw and Nik Wood, were replaced by Declan Curry and Naga Munchetty, the latter joining from Bloomberg TV.

== Broadcast schedule ==
The former Goldfish programme titles.

The show had a regular weekday slot at 12.30 pm until 1 pm, except on Wednesdays when it was broadcast an hour later. The programme was broadcast for 42 weeks of the year, taking a break for Easter, Christmas and some sports tournaments coverage, such as Wimbledon, the Olympic Games and golf.

== Graphics ==
The original title sequence created by Piers Helm, featured a real goldfish and a rubber shark in a tank that contained the programme's subject matter represented as kitsch fish tank objects. These objects were a treasure chest, bank, factory and a version of the Richard Rogers Lloyd's building. The title sequence led to a virtual set that was designed to look like a converted warehouse when in fact, the studio it came from was the smallest BBC News studio. By 2000, the title sequence had been changed by BBC Design to a computer generated sequence in which a goldfish is trying to escape from a shark on board a sunken ship. The programme graphics also reflected this style with a marine-themed studio background. Other graphics were in a "crude clipart" style.

== See also ==
- Business Daily
