= Adrian Chiles =

British television and radio presenter

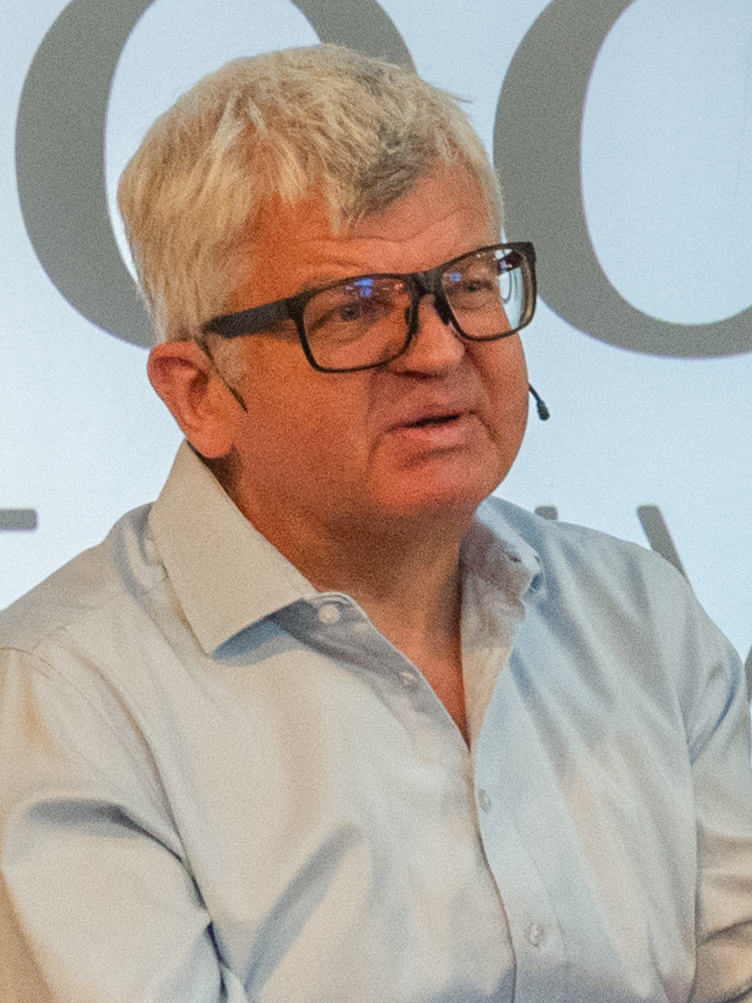
- Chiles at the 2024 Chiswick Book Festival
- Born: 21 March 1967 (age 59); Quinton, Birmingham, England
- Education: Westfield College, University of London
- Occupations: Broadcaster; writer
- Years active: 1994–present
- Employer(s): BBC (1994–2010, 2013–present); ITV (2010–2015)
- Television: Working Lunch (1994–2007); Match of the Day 2 (2004–2010); The Apprentice: You're Fired! (2006–2009); The One Show (2007–2010); Daybreak (2010–2011); ITV Sport (2010–2015); That Sunday Night Show (2011–2012)
- Spouses: Jane Garvey (m. 1998; div. 2009) Katharine Viner (m. 2022)
- Children: 2

Adrian Chiles (born 21 March 1967) is a British writer and television and radio presenter. He has co-presented both The One Show (2007–2010) and Daybreak (2010–2011) with Christine Lampard. He was also the chief presenter for football coverage on ITV Sport from 2010 until 2015. His journalistic training and love of football resulted in him presenting business programmes such as Working Lunch and The Money Programme as well as sports programmes like Match of the Day 2. He currently works for BBC Radio 5 Live.

== Early life and career ==
Chiles was born in Quinton, Birmingham, to an English father and Croatian mother. The family moved a few miles away to Hagley, Worcestershire, when he was four years of age. His Birmingham accent is a feature of his presentations. He also speaks Croatian, despite having a self-confessed "imperfect" understanding of the language's verbs, declensions, and cases. Chiles attended Haybridge High School, and then worked in his father's scaffolding business, before graduating with a degree in English literature from the University of London (studying at Westfield College, now part of Queen Mary, University of London).

Before going to university he was a keen amateur actor, appearing in the Crescent Theatre's musical production of Mary O'Malley's Once A Catholic and Sandy Wilson's The Cheese. After university, while waiting for his broken leg to heal from an amateur football incident, he applied for and failed both Civil Service exams, before being asked to apply for MI5 — he failed the second interview. He studied journalism at Cardiff and then worked as a sports reporter for the News of the World.

== Television ==
=== BBC ===
Chiles joined the BBC, originally for work experience on Business Breakfast.

Chiles's experience from Financial World Tonight led to him fronting the BBC Two business show Working Lunch, where he came to popular notice.

He has since created, scripted and fronted a variety of other programmes for the BBC including, for BBC Two, the 2003 series So What Do You Do All Day? – a look at the lives of the rich and famous – and Asian Millionaires. For BBC One he created and fronted Royal Millions, an investigation of the Queen's finances, as well as reports for Panorama and various documentaries.

From 2006 until 2009, Chiles presented the spin-off series of the popular UK television show The Apprentice called The Apprentice: You're Fired! in which he interviews the latest candidate to be fired. He left the BBC in 2009, and was replaced by Dara Ó Briain.

During August 2006 Chiles co-presented a pilot of a new BBC One early-evening magazine programme, The One Show. The programme was re-commissioned for 2007 with Chiles returning as host, leaving Working Lunch. Chiles's last appearance on The One Show was on 30 April 2010 and his favourite guest from the programme, rock singer Robert Plant, appeared again. His final show also saw video tributes to an emotional Chiles from Prime Minister Gordon Brown and political leaders David Cameron and Nick Clegg.

In April 2007, Chiles was a guest host of BBC One's satirical news quiz, Have I Got News for You.

In January 2016, Chiles returned to BBC television, where he fronted a two-part religion/travel series My Mediterranean with Adrian Chiles for BBC Two. In July 2016, he presented a special edition of Panorama called "Why We Voted to Leave: Britain Speaks" for BBC One. On 1 January 2019, he hosted a follow-up programme on BBC Radio 4 called Brexit: bewitched, bothered or bewildered? in which he spoke again to the same people, more than two years on, on how they now felt about Brexit. In November 2016, he fronted one-off documentary Whites v Blacks: How Football Changed a Nation for BBC Two.

Chiles co-presented Christine and Adrian's Friendship Test, a three-part documentary series with Christine Lampard. The series was broadcast on BBC Northern Ireland in November 2017.

In August 2018, Chiles presented a BBC Two documentary entitled Drinkers Like Me in which he admitted to regularly drinking in excess of 100 units of alcohol per week and investigated why alcohol had become such a big part of his life. As part of the programme, a doctor carried out a Fibroscan liver test on him, which produced a score of 8.9, indicating mild/moderate fibrosis of the liver and significant hepatic steatosis.

In December 2018, Chiles participated with four other celebrities, in series one, episode five of I'll Get This, for BBC Two which involved part quiz, part peer vote, with the losing celebrity paying the entire restaurant bill for their table.

In December 2023, Chiles presented the second series of My Life At Christmas (the first series was presented by Sally Phillips). The programme was commissioned by the BBC's Religious department, and saw him interviewing Oti Mabuse, John Simpson, and Martin and Shirlie Kemp.

=== BBC Sport ===
When the BBC won back the rights to Premier League football highlights, Chiles became the host of Match of the Day 2 on Sundays. In the run-up to the 2006 World Cup, he was an integral part of BBC Three's African Cup of Nations coverage. He was also a member of the BBC's World Cup presenting team, often bringing viewers late night highlights. He was a main presenter of the BBC's Euro 2008 coverage and anchored the morning coverage of the 2008 Olympics from Beijing alongside Hazel Irvine.

=== ITV ===
After news media speculation suggesting that the BBC wished to increase the popularity of The One Show on Fridays by introducing Chris Evans alongside Christine Bleakley in an extended one-hour format, Chiles was said to be discussing a contract with ITV. After Evans was confirmed as the new Friday presenter in a revamped one-hour format, Chiles left the BBC for ITV in a four-year contract golden handcuffs deal worth £6 million over four years ending on 20 April 2014. Chiles left the BBC on 30 April 2010.

From May 2010, Chiles fronted ITV's football coverage. He made his ITV debut on 24 May 2010, presenting the England v Mexico friendly at Wembley (England won the match 3–1).

On 6 September 2010, he made his first appearance on Daybreak, ITV's new breakfast television programme. The show failed to capture a larger market share than its competitor BBC Breakfast, and on 18 November 2011 it was announced that Chiles would be axed from the show. He was replaced by Dan Lobb.

In January 2011, Chiles began presenting That Sunday Night Show on ITV, which returned for a second series in September 2011 and a third in January 2012.

With his ITV contract ending on 20 April 2014, Chiles signed a new contract to host and anchor ITV's football coverage, including the FIFA World Cup in Brazil. The revised contract amounted to £500,000 per year, allowing Chiles to pursue other non-sport ventures.

On 23 January 2015, it was announced that Chiles had left his ITV Sport role as football host with immediate effect. He has not returned to the channel since and says he was "booted off" but he saw it coming due to self-medicating with alcohol and the antidepressant citalopram. He said that he had hoped it "could have ended with a handshake" instead of the way it did.

== Radio ==
In his early career at the BBC, Chiles became an assistant producer; by 1993, he was presenting Radio 4's Financial World Tonight.

He began presenting and producing his own show Chiles on Saturday for Radio 5 Live, which was awarded the sports category gold medal at the Sony Radio Academy Awards in 2002.

In November 2013, Chiles returned to Radio 5 Live, co-presenting Drive on Fridays with Anna Foster.

In October 2014, he became the Monday and Tuesday host of new programme 5 Live Daily from 10 am to 1 pm; with Peter Allen, and subsequently Emma Barnett, hosting Wednesday to Friday.

In January 2018, he was moved to Fridays only and the title was changed to Chiles on Friday, with Emma Barnett hosting from Monday to Thursday under the title The Emma Barnett Show, although the content remains essentially the same. From January 2021, Chiles also presented the programme on Thursdays as Naga Munchetty took over the show on Mondays to Wednesdays.

In September 2025, Chiles became the presenter of Saturday Live on BBC Radio 4, replacing Nikki Bedi and presenting the show solo from Cardiff.

== Writing ==
In February 2019, Chiles began writing a twice weekly column at The Guardian focused on subjects that Gabriella Paiella of GQ called “the banalities of everyday life” and “a gentle and delightful respite from the daily cesspool of takes and terrible news.”

The column features headlines like We can go to the moon – so why can’t we stop my glasses sliding down my nose?, Who are these people who love to feel sand between their toes? I hate it, You’re never too old to climb a tree – and I should know, At Easter I had a fall. The wild garlic smelled lovely, but I didn’t want to die there, I found a witch supply store opposite a Nisa Local. It's the start of a magical journey, and My dad has died but his watch ticks on. Why does that feel so heartless?.

The column has proved popular, particularly on Twitter, leading Chiles to be called “Britain’s greatest columnist” by journalist Frances Ryan and “The greatest columnist of our time” by MSNBC’s Clarissa-Jan Lin.

Chiles wrote the non-fiction book The Good Drinker: How I Learned to Love Drinking Less, published in October 2022.

== Other activities ==
Chiles was the World Record holder for highest number of kisses received in 60 seconds from 2007 until 2009, with 78.

In 2004, Chiles appeared with Johnny Vegas and Mackenzie Crook in the film Sex Lives of the Potato Men in a cameo role as himself, the host of a sex party.

He appeared on the second series of Al Murray's Happy Hour as himself, and also had a cameo as himself in Series Two of That Mitchell and Webb Look.

On 23 November 2009, Chiles released a 2 Good 2 Bad: The World Cup DVD based on the popular segment from Match of the Day 2.

In 2020, he participated in Iaith ar Daith ('Language Road Trip'), a show for S4C where he and several other celebrities learned Welsh, broadcast in April 2020. An extra episode, Iaith ar Daith 'Dolig ('Language Road Trip: Christmas') was broadcast at the end of 2020, interviewing each of the celebrities about whether they were still making use of their Welsh and the opportunities they had had to use Welsh during lockdown.

In 2022, Chiles appeared as a guest in the second "New Year's Treat" special of Taskmaster alongside Claudia Winkleman, Jonnie Peacock, Lady Leshurr, and Sayeeda Warsi. He won the special.

== Personal life ==
Chiles married Jane Garvey, a former regular presenter of Radio 4's Woman's Hour, in September 1998 in Swansea. Chiles and Garvey have two daughters. In June 2008, the couple separated and they divorced in October 2009. Chiles married Guardian editor Katharine Viner in 2022.

Chiles converted to Catholicism in 2007. During Lent 2015, he attended Mass daily and at a different church each time; a total of 46 different churches in 46 days. In the BBC programme Winter Walks, Chiles spoke about his faith in a Scarborough church.

He is a supporter of West Bromwich Albion Football Club, where he is a season ticket holder and presenter on some of the club's official DVDs.

Chiles plays the double bass, as revealed when he performed a duet with violinist Nigel Kennedy playing "Fever" on The One Show. On 7 May 2008, his co-presenter on The One Show, Christine Bleakley, sang part of a song with Chiles accompanying on piano.

Chiles claims that his "Brummie" accent worked in his favour at the BBC.

Chiles confirmed his relationship with The Guardian editor Katharine Viner in an interview with The Daily Telegraph in April 2020, saying "I've got a horror of talking about relationships. I don't mind saying I'm with Kath." Chiles has said that the relationship began as a result of him writing the column and not the other way around, though Will Self has questioned this.

In 2019, Chiles wrote an opinion piece detailing his experience after several publications such as the Mail on Sunday republished false information about his alleged marriage to a woman named Maria Walsh in his Wikipedia article, presumably from erroneous information within a Daily Mail article. The Daily Mail article has since been corrected.

In 2020, Chiles revealed in his Guardian column that he had been diagnosed with ADD. He wrote that his condition is being successfully treated with prescription drugs, after he had initially disregarded his symptoms.

Chiles describes himself as "almost vegan". He has a urinal in his flat and has written about the mixed reactions it receives.

On 20 March 2024, Chiles wrote in The Guardian of being wholly unprepared for the recent and inevitable "loss of a parent". He described his feeling of personal shock, despite him "dreading the loss" for most of his adult lifetime. His father Peter had died on 9 March at the age of 86 after suffering a serious fall and a fractured shoulder in January 2024.

=== Charity work ===
In March 2008, Chiles embarked on a charity cycling trip with footballer Alan Shearer from Newcastle upon Tyne to London via West Bromwich for Sport Relief. The duo raised £371,065 for their feat.

In 2010, Chiles grew a beard, which was later shaved off by his One Show co-host Christine Bleakley for Sport Relief, raising £60,000 in the process.

== Publications ==
- Chiles, Adrian (2007). We Don't Know What We're Doing: Adventures with the extraordinary fans of an ordinary team. Sphere. ISBN 978-1-84744-013-6.
  The stories of a varied cast of avid West Bromwich Albion supporters whom Chiles met over the course of the 2005–06 season, at the end of which the team was relegated from the Premier League. The book also documents Chiles's own obsession with his beloved "Baggies".
- Chiles, Adrian (2022). The Good Drinker: How I Learned to Love Drinking Less. Profile Books Limited. ISBN 978-1788163590.

== Filmography ==
Television

Year	Title	Role	Notes	Channel
1994–2007	Working Lunch	Co-presenter	Replaced by Nik Wood	BBC Two
2004–2010	Match of the Day 2	Presenter	Replaced by Colin Murray	BBC Two
2006–2009	The Apprentice: You're Fired!	Presenter	Replaced by Dara Ó Briain	BBC Two
2007	Have I Got News For You	Guest presenter	1 episode	BBC One
2007–2010	The One Show	Co-presenter	With Christine Lampard	BBC One
2010–2011	Daybreak	Co-presenter	With Christine Lampard and Kate Garraway	ITV
2010–2015	ITV Football	Presenter	Replaced by Mark Pougatch	ITV
2011–2012	That Sunday Night Show	Presenter	3 series	ITV
2016	My Mediterranean with Adrian Chiles	Presenter	1 series	BBC Two
2016	Panorama: Why We Voted to Leave: Britain Speaks	Presenter	One-off programme	BBC One
2016	Whites v Blacks: How Football Changed a Nation	Presenter	One-off programme	BBC Two
2017	The Premier League Show	Reporter	1 episode	BBC Two
2017	Christine and Adrian's Friendship Test	Co-presenter	With Christine Lampard	BBC Northern Ireland
2018	Drinkers Like Me	Presenter	One-off programme	BBC Two
2020	Pilgrimage: Road to Istanbul	Participant	Sultans Trail	BBC Two
2021	Strictly Come Dancing Christmas Special	Contestant	Professional dance partner; Jowita Przystal	BBC One
2022	Taskmaster's New Year Treat	Contestant	New Year special	Channel 4
2023	My Life at Christmas with Adrian Chiles	Presenter	Three-part series	BBC1

== Sources ==
- Celebrity guests gallery BBC – The One Show
- Celebrity Fan Adrian Chiles Talks Everything West Brom Exclusively to TF90M TF90M – The First 90 Minutes
- Adrian Chiles profile BBC Sport Match of the Day, 11 August 2004
