= Fi Glover =

British journalist and presenter (born 1969)

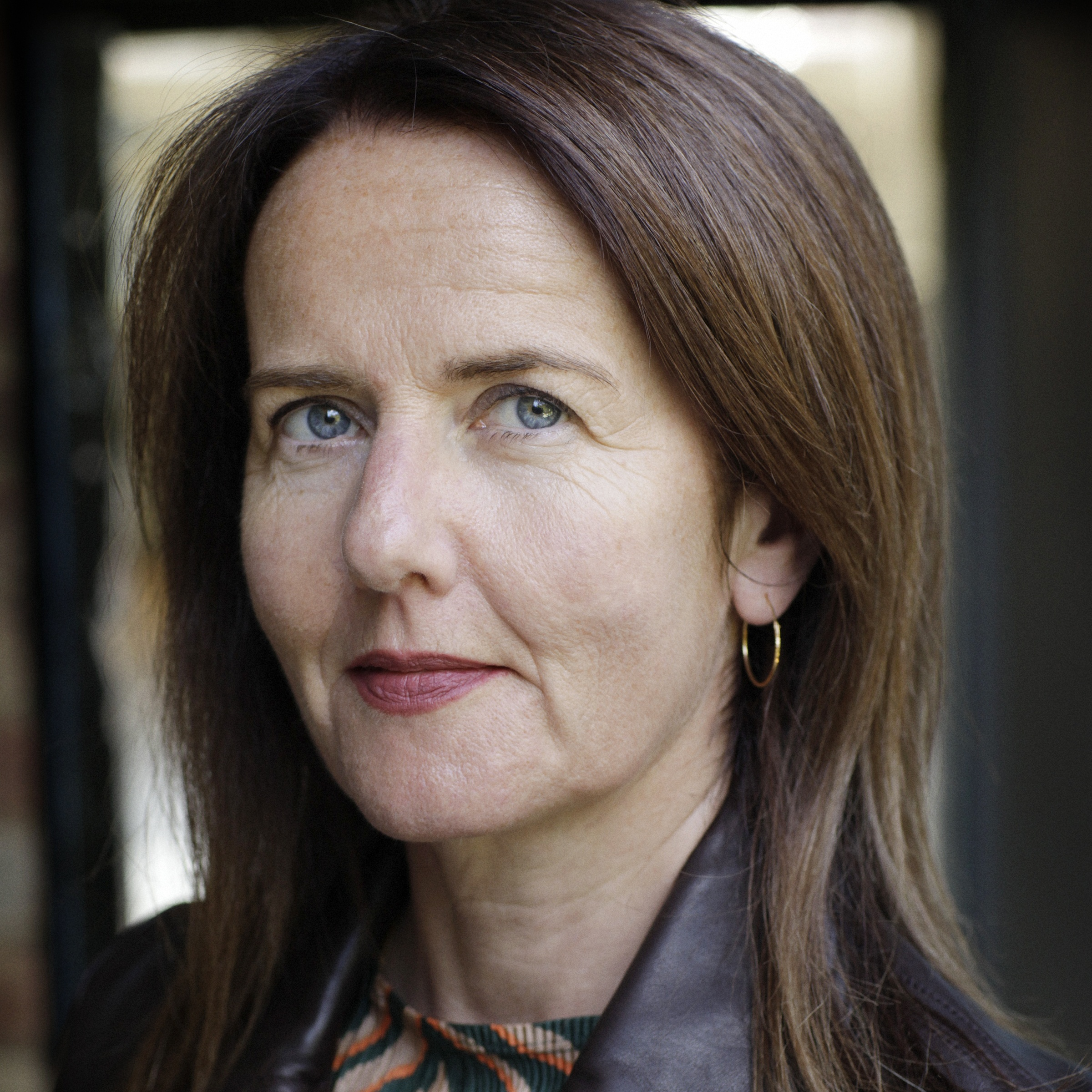
- Fi Glover in 2019
- Born: 27 February 1969 (age 57); Slough, Buckinghamshire, England
- Education: Prince's Mead School, Winchester; St Swithun's School, Winchester; University of Kent
- Occupations: Journalist; presenter; broadcaster
- Notable credit(s): Off Air; Fortunately; The Listening Project; My Perfect Country; Saturday Live
- Title: Fellow of The Radio Academy; Honorary Doctorate University of Kent; Patron of Adfam; Founder of Sound Women
- Spouses: Mark Sandell (divorced) Rick Jones (m. 2014; div. 2017)
- Children: 2

Fiona Susannah Grace Glover (born 27 February 1969) is a British journalist and presenter who currently hosts a two-hour show for Times Radio and the Off Air podcast for The Times. Before joining The Times in October 2022, Glover worked for the BBC for almost thirty years, most recently presenting the Fortunately podcast, with Jane Garvey, The Listening Project for BBC Radio 4 and My Perfect Country for the BBC World Service.

Fortunately, which by the end of 2019 had been downloaded 23 million times, was the 2018 winner of the ARIAS (Audio and Radio Industry Awards) Funniest Show and won Silver at the 2019 British Podcast Awards. It is currently No. 5 in the BBC's most popular podcasts and has been No. 1 in the Apple podcast charts. From January 2021, it was broadcast on a regular slot on BBC Radio 4. The show ended in November 2022 when Glover moved to Times Radio.

Glover worked at BBC Radio 5 Live for seven years, presenting Sunday Service, with Charlie Whelan and Andrew Pierce, Late Night Live, the Afternoon Show and the mid-morning phone-in programme. In 2004 she moved to BBC Radio 4 as the host of Broadcasting House, before launching Radio 4's Saturday Live, in March 2006. Her television presenting roles include hosting BBC One's reality history show; 24 Hours in the Past, in 2014. She has made films for Newsnight, and was the presenter of the BBC Two Travel Show from 1997 to 2000.

In 2010, Radio Times readers voted Glover the 9th Most Powerful Voice on Radio and in 2014 she was awarded a fellowship of the Radio Academy, "to recognise individuals who have made outstanding contributions to the industry and/or the Academy."

== Career ==
=== Radio ===
In 1993, Glover began her BBC career as a filing clerk on various local radio stations including BBC Somerset Sound, Humberside and Northampton. She joined GLR in London, as a junior reporter and went on to present the Breakfast Show with Gideon Coe three years later, winning a silver Sony Award in 1995. In 1996, she moved to BBC Radio 5 Live, where she spent seven years as a key broadcaster in news and political coverage, presenting shows such as Sunday Service, with Charlie Whelan and Andrew Pierce, Late Night Live, the Afternoon Show and the mid-morning phone in programme.

In 2004, Glover took over from Eddie Mair as host of Sunday morning news analysis programme Broadcasting House, winning a Silver Sony Award in the same year. She became the host of BBC Radio 4's Saturday Live from its inception in 2006 until 2011. In May 2008, Saturday Live won Best UK Speech Programme at the Sony Awards. In 2010 Radio Times readers voted Glover 9th Most Powerful Voice on Radio.

Glover returned to BBC Radio 4 with The Listening Project, a joint initiative by the British Library and the BBC, which started on 29 March 2012, aiming "to capture the nation in conversation". In 2013 The Listening Project won a Bronze Sony Award in the Best Speech Programme category. In 2014 she was made a Fellow of the Radio Academy.

In 2015 and Glover presented two series of Shared Experience on Radio Four, a programme which interviews people who have had similar, and frequently traumatic, experiences, such as being bullied at school, coping with addiction or being held hostage. In Autumn 2015, she launched My Perfect Country on the BBC World Service, a current affairs show made in partnership with the UCL Institute for Global Prosperity. Co-presented with Martha Lane Fox and Henrietta Moore, it became the first ever radio show to be recorded during a sitting session of the UN. It opened the UN ECOSOC session of 2016 in New York City at the invitation of the UN Secretary General. My Perfect Country ran for 3 series and was followed by two series of My Perfect City, presented with Ellie Cosgrave and Greg Clark.

During 2015 and 2016 Glover also hosted Two Rooms for BBC Radio 4, a discussion programme using the notion of the focus group. It puts two different groups of people in separate rooms to discuss the same topic, e.g. Brexit or immigration, and then brings them together to see if they have changed their positions.

On 29 March 2017, Glover, together with broadcaster Jane Garvey started a weekly podcast series on BBC Radio 4, Fortunately: A frank look behind the scenes with broadcasters Jane Garvey and Fi Glover as guests from Radio, TV and podcasting share stories they probably shouldn't. Fortunately, which has been downloaded 4.5 million times, is currently No.5 in the BBC’s most popular podcasts and has been No.1 in the Apple podcast charts. From Jan 2021, it was broadcast in a regular slot on BBC Radio 4. In addition to winning silver at the 2017 British Podcast awards, Fortunately also won Funniest Show at the 2018 ARIAS, and Bronze in the Spotlight Award at the British Podcast Awards 2019. Guests on the show include Ian Wright, Anne Tyler, Monty Don, Ruth Jones, Will Young, Sara Cox, Claudia Winkleman, Miriam Margolyes, Will Self, Jeremy Vine, Ken Bruce, Tracey Thorn, Emily Maitlis, and Kirsty Wark.

In April 2017, Glover launched a new BBC Radio Four series, Glass Half Full, chairing debates between optimists and pessimists on key issues such as health care, population growth and gender equality. Glover has also made a series of occasional documentaries on different aspects of parenting, for BBC Radio 4 with producer Sarah Cuddon: Listen Without Mother in July 2014, The Great Egg Freeze July 2014,The Expressing Room March 2018 and Dads and The Delivery Room in December 2019.

In September 2022, it was announced that Glover would join Times Radio to host a daily, two-hour show with Jane Garvey. The pair also host a daily podcast for the Times: Off Air.

=== Television ===
Between 1997 and 2000 Glover presented The Travel Show on BBC Two. In 2012 she was a participant in the BBC’s Sport Relief Does Bake Off and in 2015 she hosted BBC One's six part reality history show, 24 Hours in the Past where celebrities travel back in time to try living like Victorians.

Glover has also presented several editions of Newsnight and two films for the programme in 2013; The Rise of Digital Feminism, and Legal Highs.

=== Writing ===
In 2000, Glover travelled the world visiting notable radio stations, which resulted in the book Travels with my Radio: I am an Oil Tanker (ISBN 0-09-188274-5). The title reflected the hazards of live broadcasting with Dickie Arbiter's opening statement "I am an oil tanker, Dickie Arbiter is on fire in the Gulf." The radio stations documented in the book include a temporary BBC station for the Euro 2000 football tournament, run from a café in Belgium, an English-language station in Geneva, a station run by Irish UN peacekeeping forces in Lebanon, and Montserrat Radio which broadcast throughout the 1996 Soufrière Hills volcano eruption.

Glover has written a weekly column for Waitrose Weekend since 2012. It went online in 2020.

In September 2021, Glover published a book written with Fortunately co-host Jane Garvey, titled Did I Say That Out Loud?: Notes on the Chuff of Life.

== Other activities ==
Glover was the Chair of the Orange Prize for Fiction in 2009 and is a Founder of Sound Women, a lobby group set up to campaign for parity in the broadcasting industry.

Glover is also the patron of Adfam, a national charity working to improve life for families affected by drugs or alcohol. In 2016 the University of Kent awarded Glover an Honorary Doctorate in recognition of her success in broadcasting.

== Awards ==
- Sony Awards 1995, Silver - GLR Breakfast show
- Sony Awards 2004, Silver - Broadcasting House
- Sony Awards 2008, Gold - Saturday Live Best Speech Programme
- Sony Awards 2008, Silver - Saturday Live Listener Participation Award
- Sony Awards 2013, Bronze - The Listening Project
- Audio Production Awards 2016 - Presenter of the Year
- British Podcast Awards 2017, Silver - Fortunately
- ARIAS 2018, Funniest Show Winner - Fortunately
- British Podcast Awards 2019, Silver - Fortunately

== Personal life ==
Glover was born in Slough, Berkshire, but grew up in Hampshire, with her mother Priscilla (Cilla) and sister Isabella (Izi), while her father was in Hong Kong establishing a business. Her parents eventually separated. Her mother's father was Chassar Moir, an obstetrics professor credited with saving the lives of countless women worldwide. She attended Prince's Mead School, an independent co-educational preparatory school in Winchester, followed by St Swithun's School, an independent girls' school in Winchester. She studied classical civilisation and philosophy at the University of Kent from 1987 to 1990.

Glover was married to Mark Sandell, then a producer at BBC Radio 5 Live. Victoria Derbyshire met Sandell at Radio 5 Live and had an affair with him while he was still married to Glover.Glover married Rick Jones, a Google executive, in April 2014. They have two children. The couple separated in 2017.
