= Exposition Universelle (1889) =

World's Fair held in Paris, France

1889 Paris
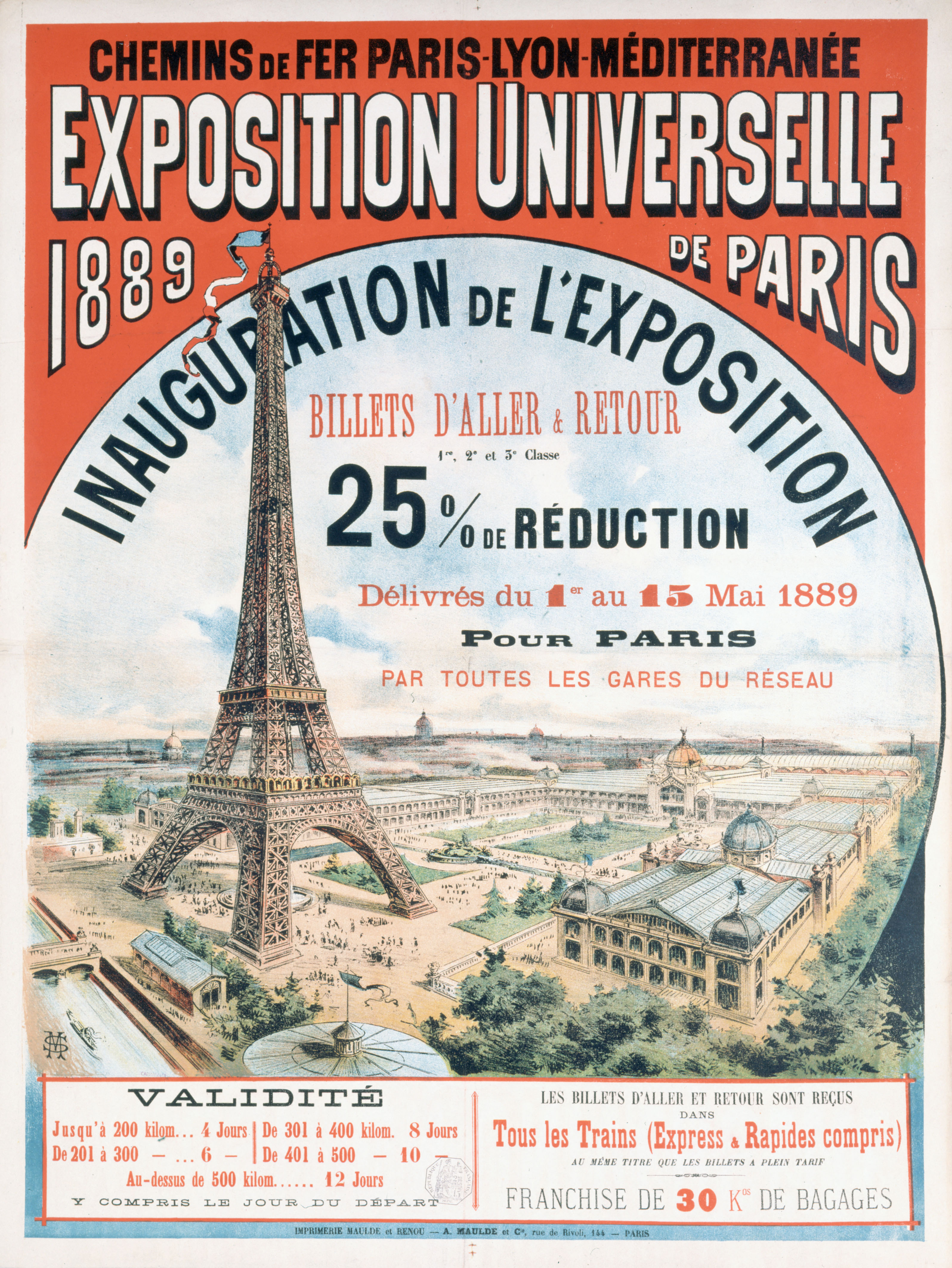
- Poster

Overview
- BIE-class: Universal exposition
- Category: Historical
- Name: Exposition universelle de 1889
- Building(s): Eiffel Tower
- Area: 96 hectares (240 acres)
- Invention(s): Phonograph
- Visitors: 32,250,297
- Organized by: Charles Adolphe Alphand

Participant(s)
- Countries: 35
- Business: 61,722

Location
- Country: France
- City: Paris
- Venue: Champ de Mars, Trocadéro
- Coordinates: 48°51′30″N 2°17′39″E

Timeline
- Opening: 6 May 1889; 137 years ago
- Closure: 31 October 1889

Universal expositions
- Previous: Exposición Universal de Barcelona in Barcelona
- Next: World's Columbian Exposition in Chicago

The Exposition Universelle de 1889 (French pronunciation: [ɛkspozisjɔ̃ ynivɛʁsɛl]), better known in English as the 1889 Paris Exposition, was a world's fair held in Paris, France, from 6 May to 31 October 1889. It was the fifth of ten major expositions held in the city between 1855 and 1937. (Note: This includes six world expositions (in 1855, 1867, 1878, 1889, 1900 and 1937), two specialized expositions (in 1881 and 1925) and two colonial expositions (in 1907 and 1931).) It attracted more than thirty-two million visitors. The most famous structure created for the exposition, and still remaining, is the Eiffel Tower.

== Organization ==
The exposition was held to celebrate the 100th anniversary of the Storming of the Bastille, which marked the beginning of French Revolution, and was also seen as a way to stimulate the economy and pull France out of an economic recession. The exposition attracted 61,722 official exhibitors, of whom twenty-five thousand were from outside of France.

== Admission price ==
Admission to the exposition cost forty centimes, at a time when the price of an "economy" plate of meat and vegetables in a Paris cafe was ten centimes. Visitors paid an additional price for several of the exposition's most popular attractions. Climbing the Eiffel Tower cost five Francs; admission to the popular panoramas, theatres and concerts was one franc. Visitors from the French provinces could buy a ticket which included the train fare and entry into the exposition. The total cost of exposition was 41,500,000 francs, while income was 49,500,000 francs. It was the last of the Paris world's fairs to make a profit.

== National participation and boycotts ==
The countries that officially participated in the exposition were Andorra, Argentina, Bolivia, Chile, Costa Rica, the Dominican Republic, Ecuador, the United States, Greece, Guatemala, Haiti, Hawaii, Honduras, India, Japan, Morocco, Mexico, Monaco, Nicaragua, Norway, Paraguay, Persia, Saint-Martin, El Salvador, Serbia, Siam, the South African Republic, Switzerland, Uruguay and Venezuela. The British dominions of New Zealand and Tasmania also took part.

Because of the theme of the exposition, celebrating the overthrow of the French monarchy, nearly all European countries with monarchies officially boycotted the exposition. The boycotting nations were Germany, Austria-Hungary, Belgium, Spain, the United Kingdom, Italy, the Netherlands, Portugal, Russia and Sweden.

Nonetheless, many citizens and companies from those countries participated, and a number of countries had their participation entirely funded by private sponsors. They included Germany and Alsace-Lorraine, Austria-Hungary, Belgium, Brazil, China, Denmark, Egypt, Spain, the United Kingdom and its colonies, Haiti, Italy, Luxembourg, the Netherlands, Peru, Portugal, Romania, Russia, Finland and Sweden.

== Exposition sites ==
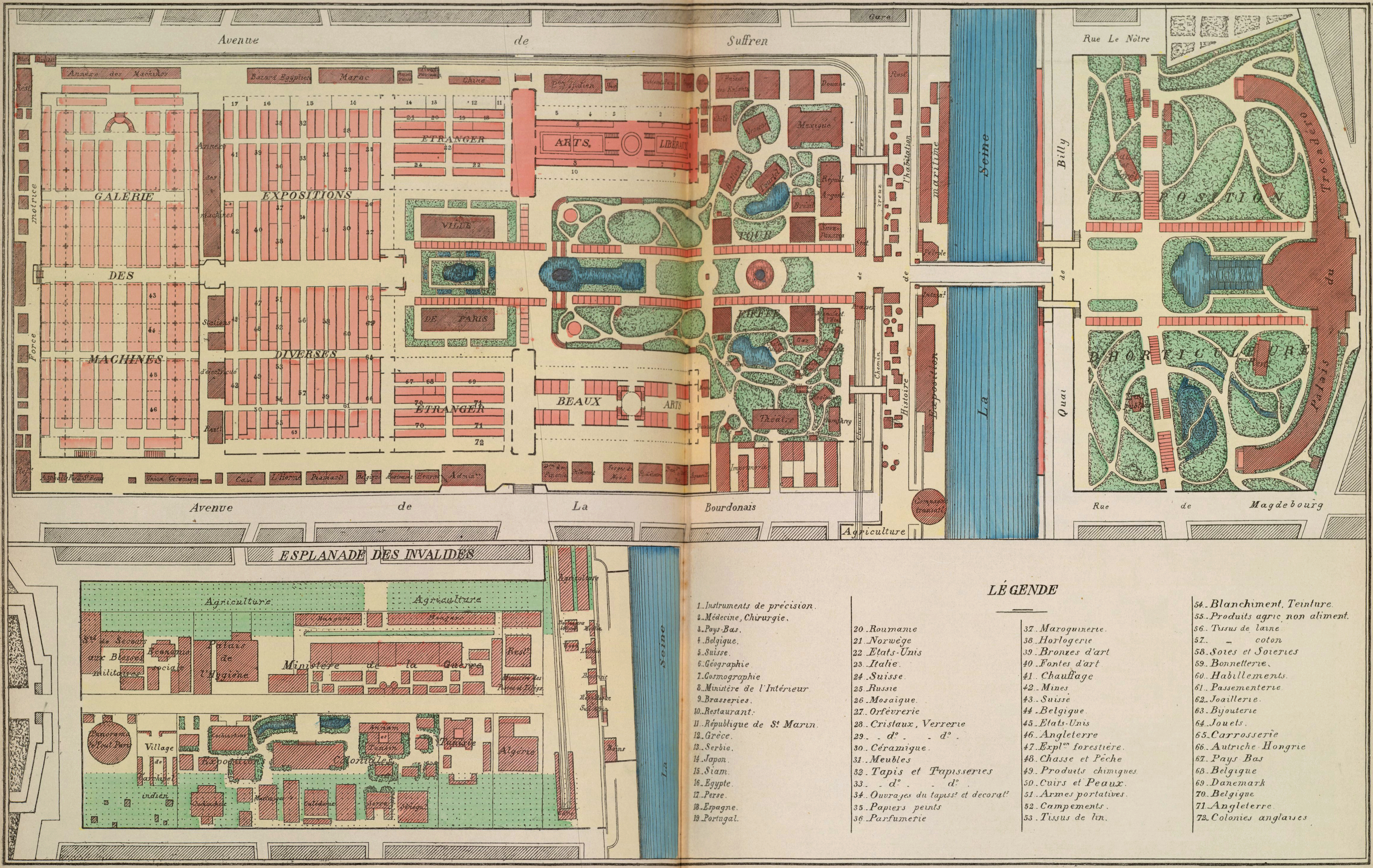
Plan of the Exposition Universelle of 1889

The exposition occupied two large sites. The main site was on Champs de Mars on the Left Bank, which had been the parade ground of the Ecole Militaire, and had been occupied by the 1878 Universal Exposition. This was the site of the major part of the exposition, including the Eiffel Tower, Palace of Machines, and the Palaces of Fine Arts and Liberal Arts. The exposition extended across the Seine to the right bank, to the Trocadero Palace, which had been built on the heights for the 1878 Exposition. The slope from the Trocadero Palace down to the Seine was filled with terrace, fountains, gardens and horticultural exhibits.

A separate, smaller site was located on the esplanade of Les Invalides, which hosted the pavilions of the French colonies. This section featured a large assortment of outdoor restaurants and cafes with foods from Indochina, North Africa, and other cuisines from around the world. The colonial pavilions conveyed the multiculturalism of France's colonies, the largest of them being the Palais Central des Colonies, designed by Stephen Sauvestre, who notably contributed to the design of the Eiffel Tower. In addition to the architectural displays of France's colonies, the exposition showcased a construction of villages inhabited by natives of the colonies, to be observed by viewers, such as a village nègre where 400 people were displayed. The colonized people had their daily lives displayed for the exposition visitors, which made some of them uncomfortable. Samba Lawbé Thiam, a jeweler from Senegal who was part of the 1889 Exposition, said the following:

"We are very humiliated to be exhibited this way, in huts like savages; these straw and mud huts do not give an idea of Senegal. In Senegal ... we have large buildings, railroad stations, railroads; we light them with electricity. The Bureau of Hygiene does not tolerate the construction of this type of hovel. Those [existing ones] that fall into disrepair are not replaced."

The incorporation of indigenous colonized individuals as a "human zoo" in the exposition was intended to be an educational element and was a popular attraction, but has also historically been framed as an exploitative and patronizing display of colonized people without their consent.

This colonial section of the exposition was linked to the Champs de Mars site by a corridor of pavilions along the left Bank. This corridor, at the foot of the Eiffel Tower, also featured a display called "The History of Human Habitation", with model houses depicting the history of domestic architecture, designed with much imagination by Charles Garnier, architect of the Paris Opera.

There were twenty-two different entrances to the exposition, around its perimeter. They were open from 8 a.m. until 6:00 p.m. for the major exhibits and palaces, and until 11:00 in the evening for the illuminated greens and restaurants. The major ceremonial entrance was located at Les Invalides consisting of two tall pylons with colorful ornament, like giant candelabras.

== Views of the Exposition ==
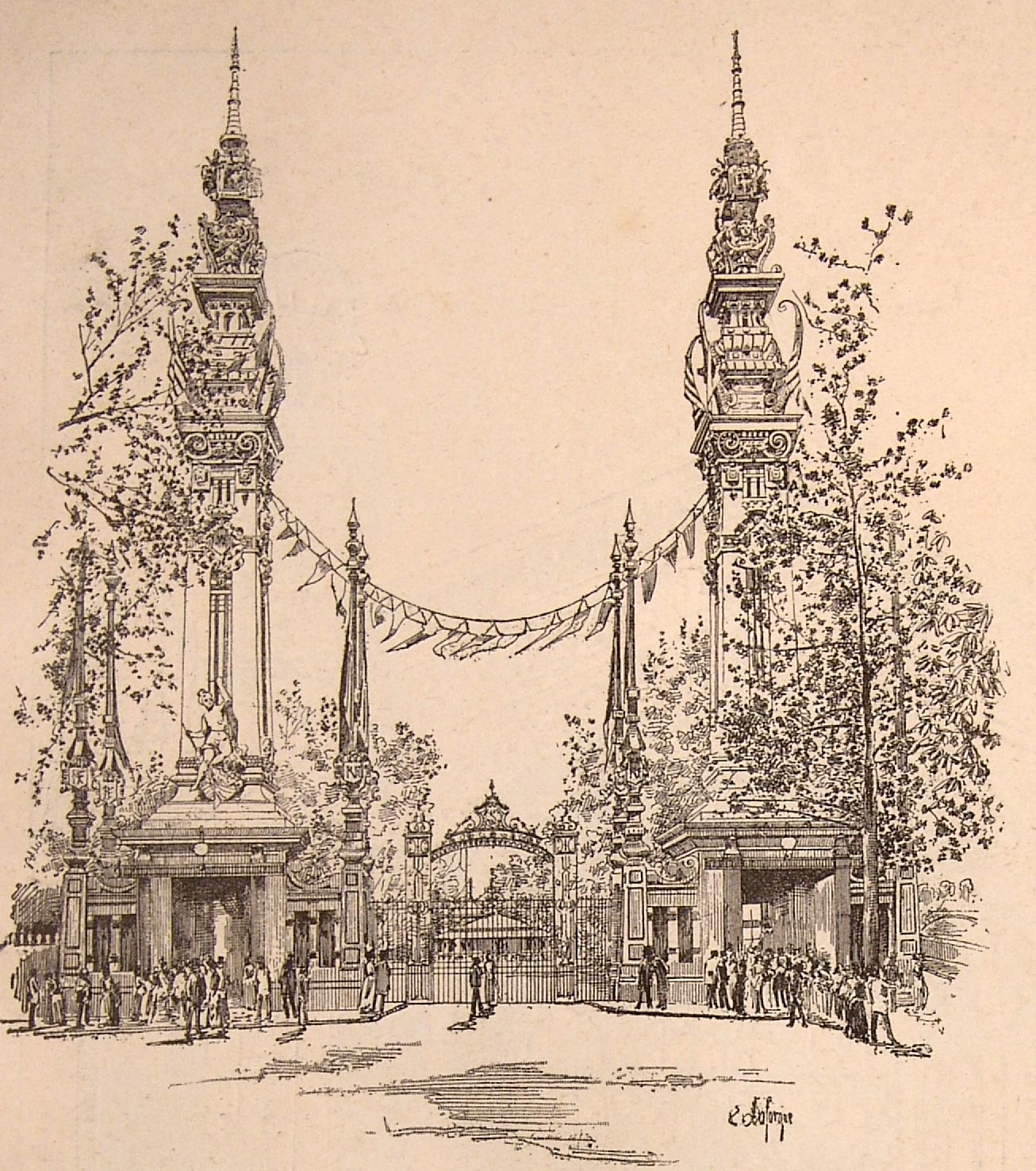
The main entrance of the exposition

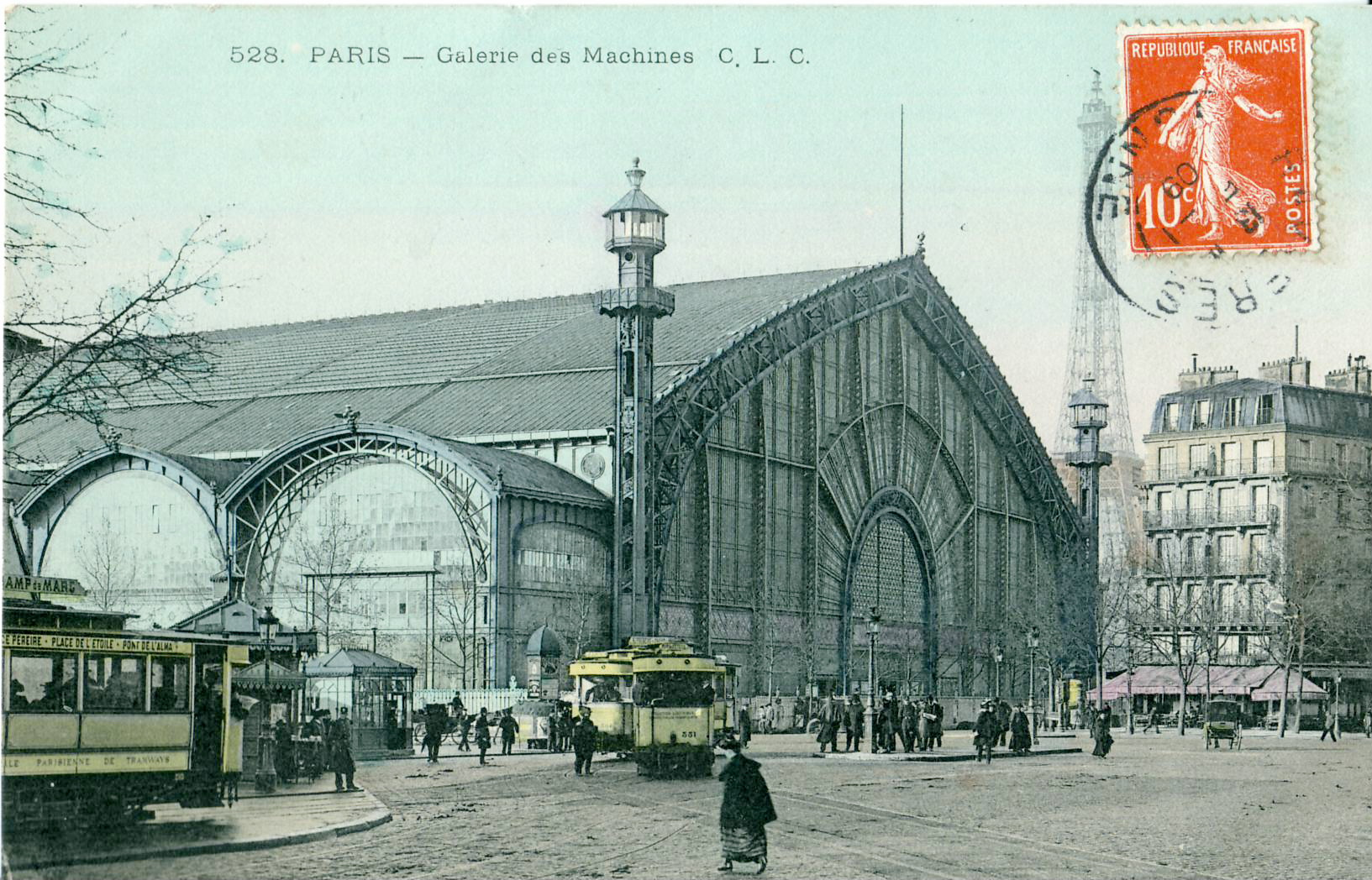
Postcard of trams stopping at the Galerie des Machines, at the edge of the exposition

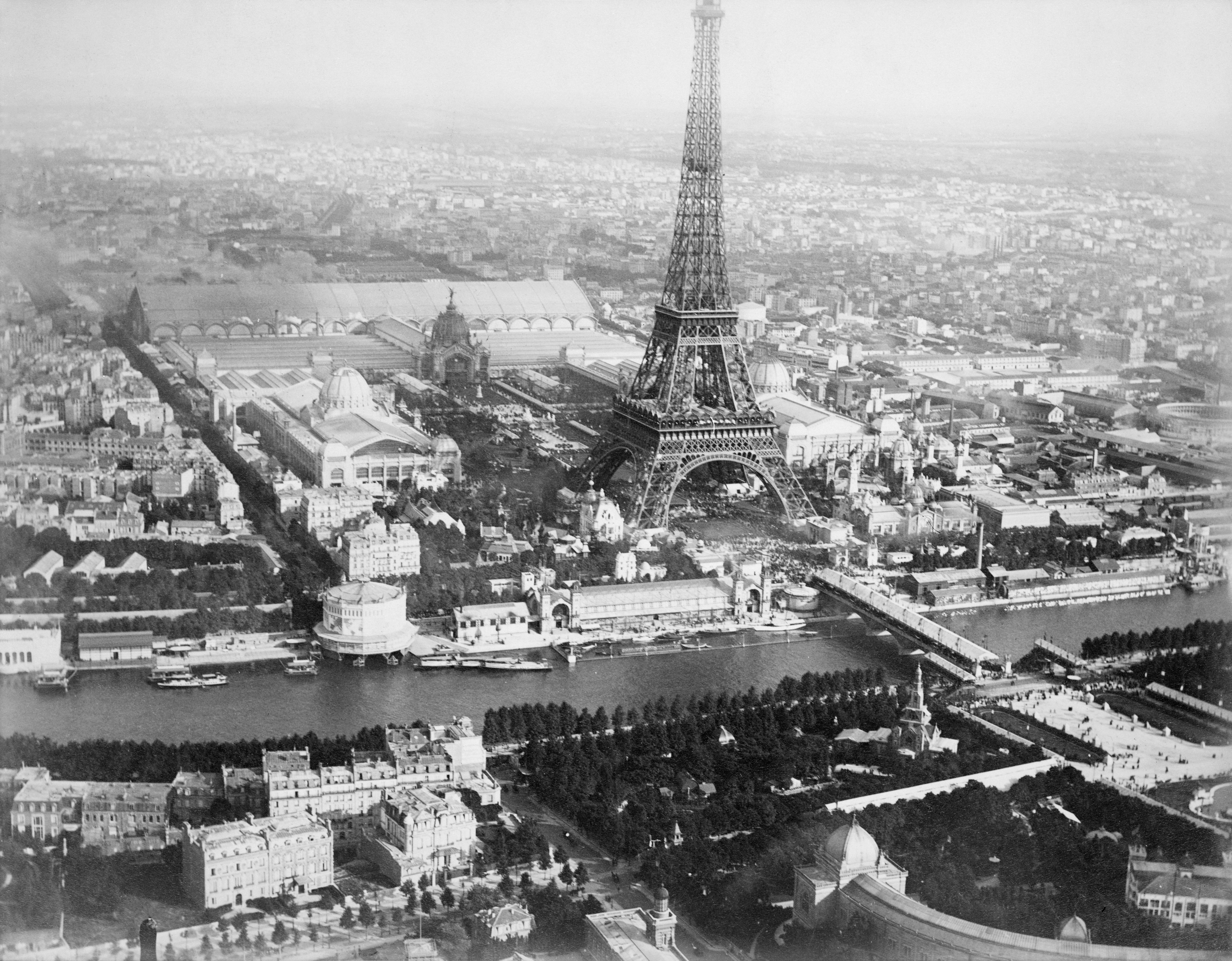
Exposition seen from a balloon (1889)

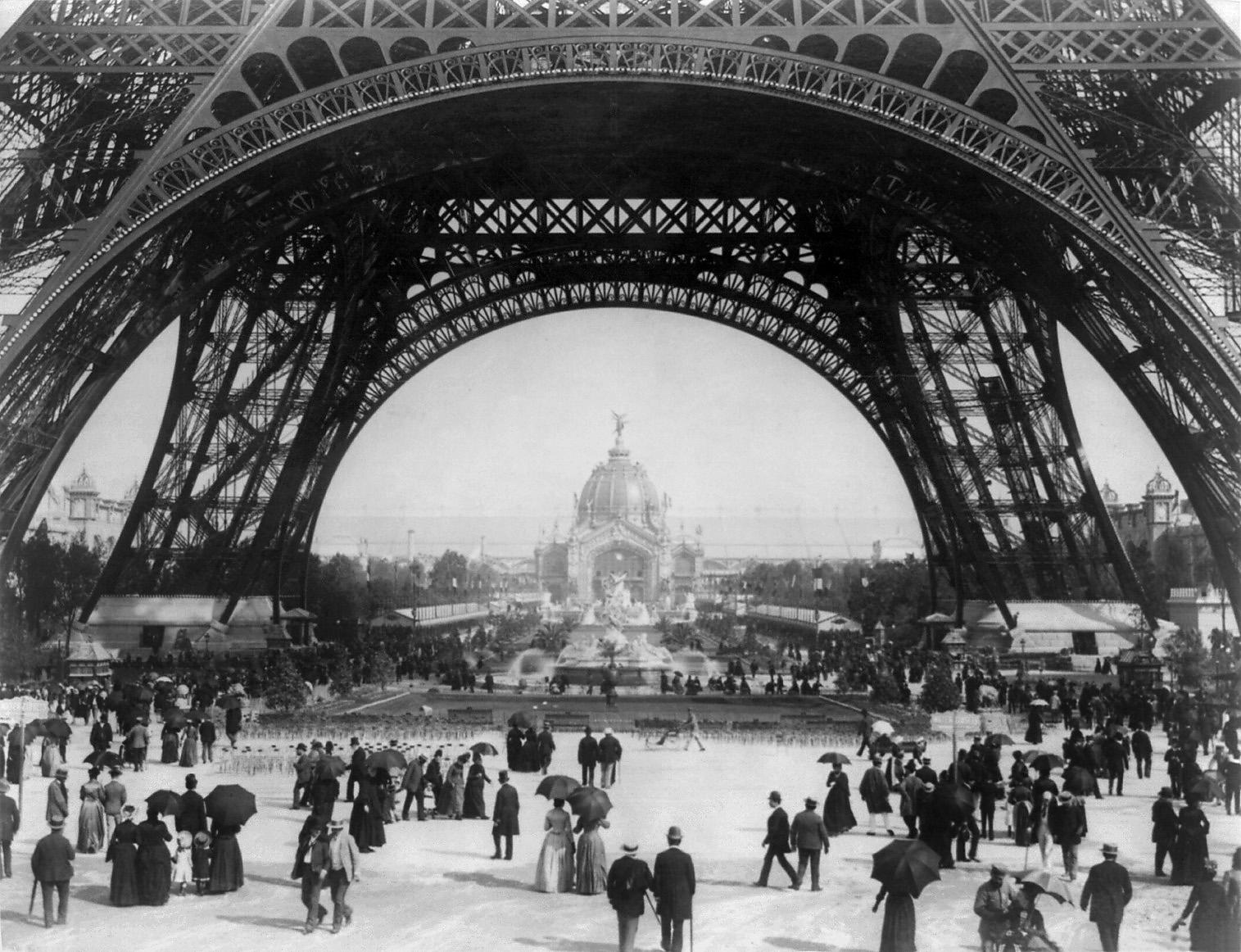
View under the Eiffel Tower toward the Central Dome

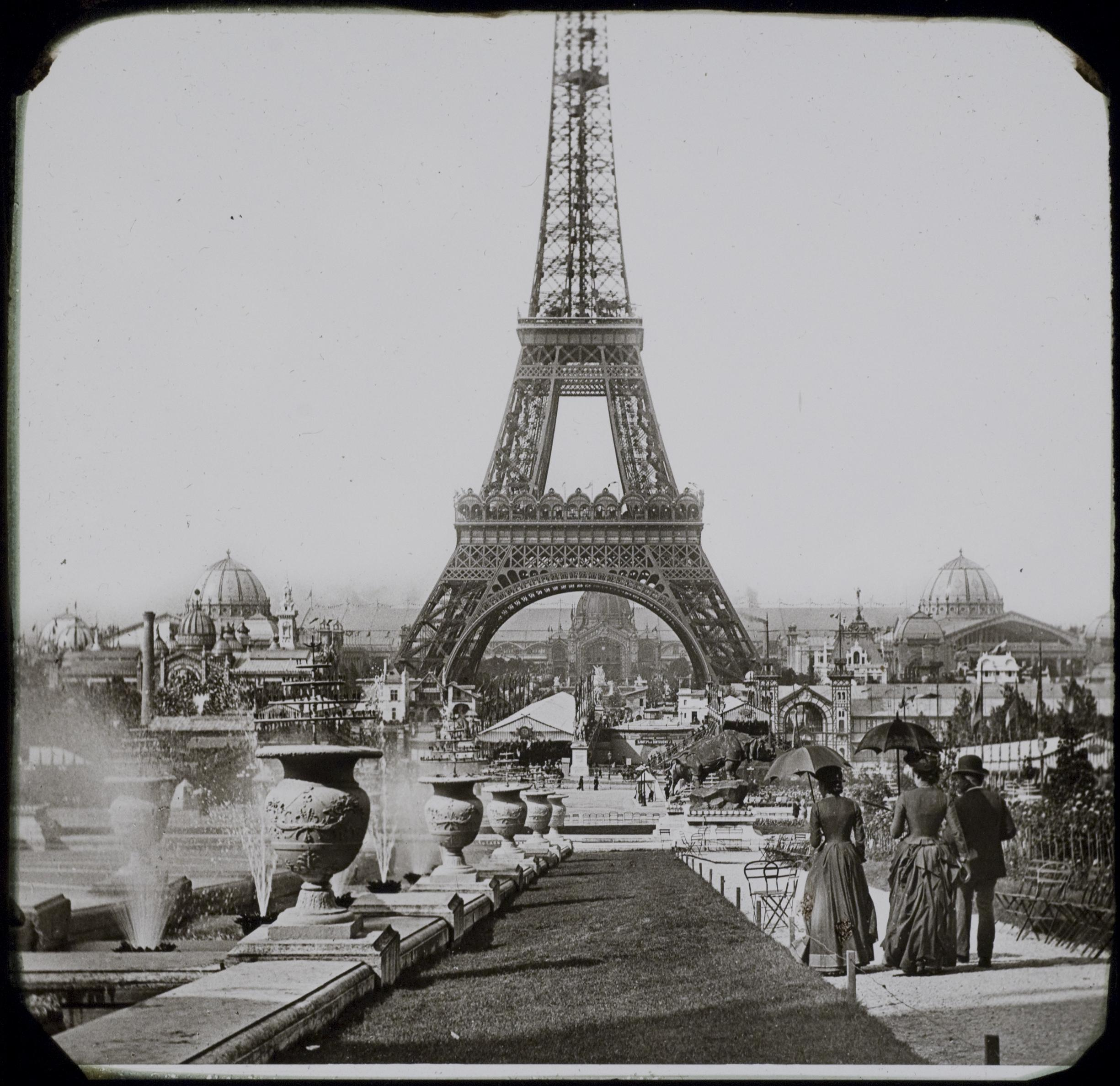
View of exposition from Trocadero

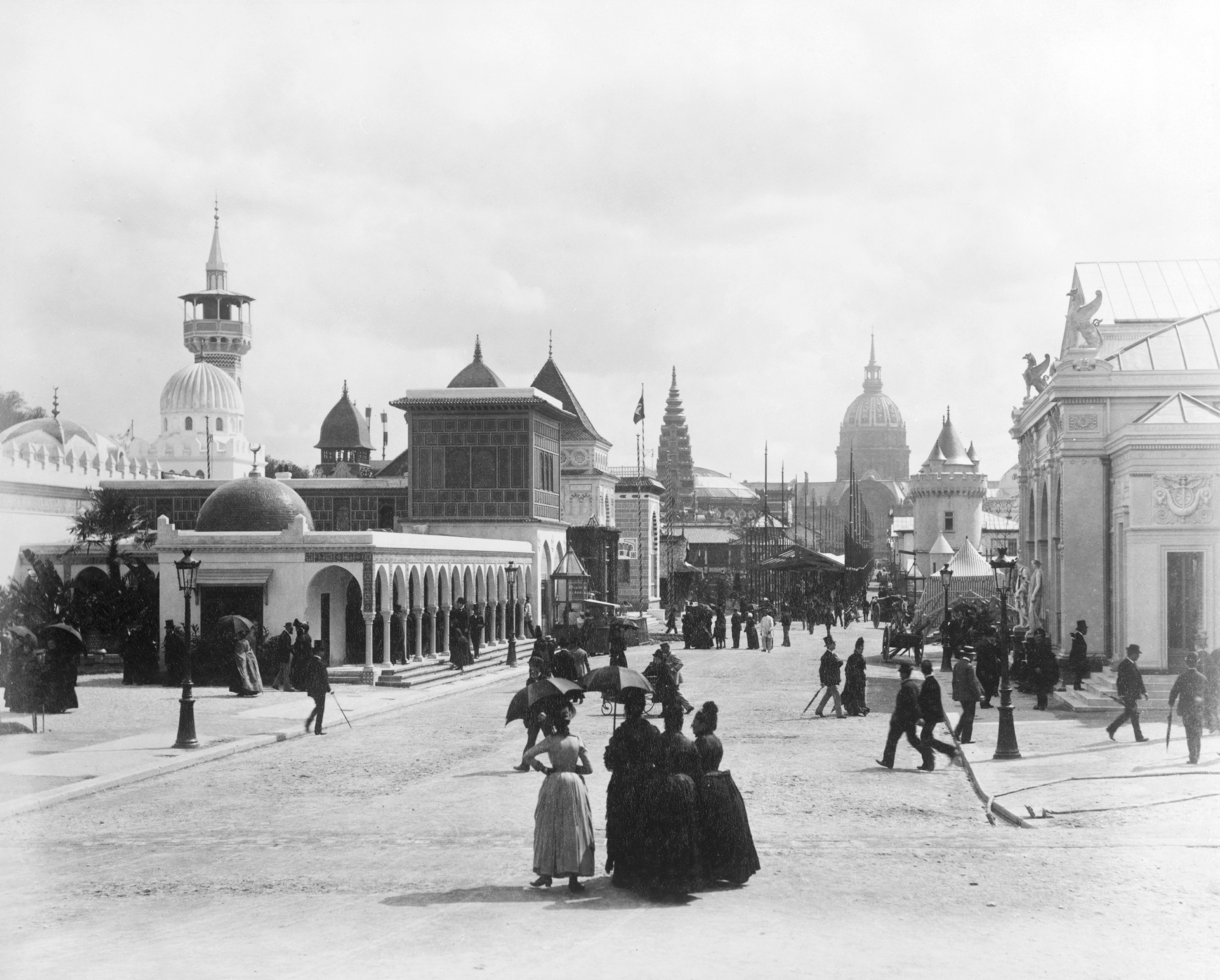
Pavilions on the Esplanade des Invalides, with Les Invalides in the background

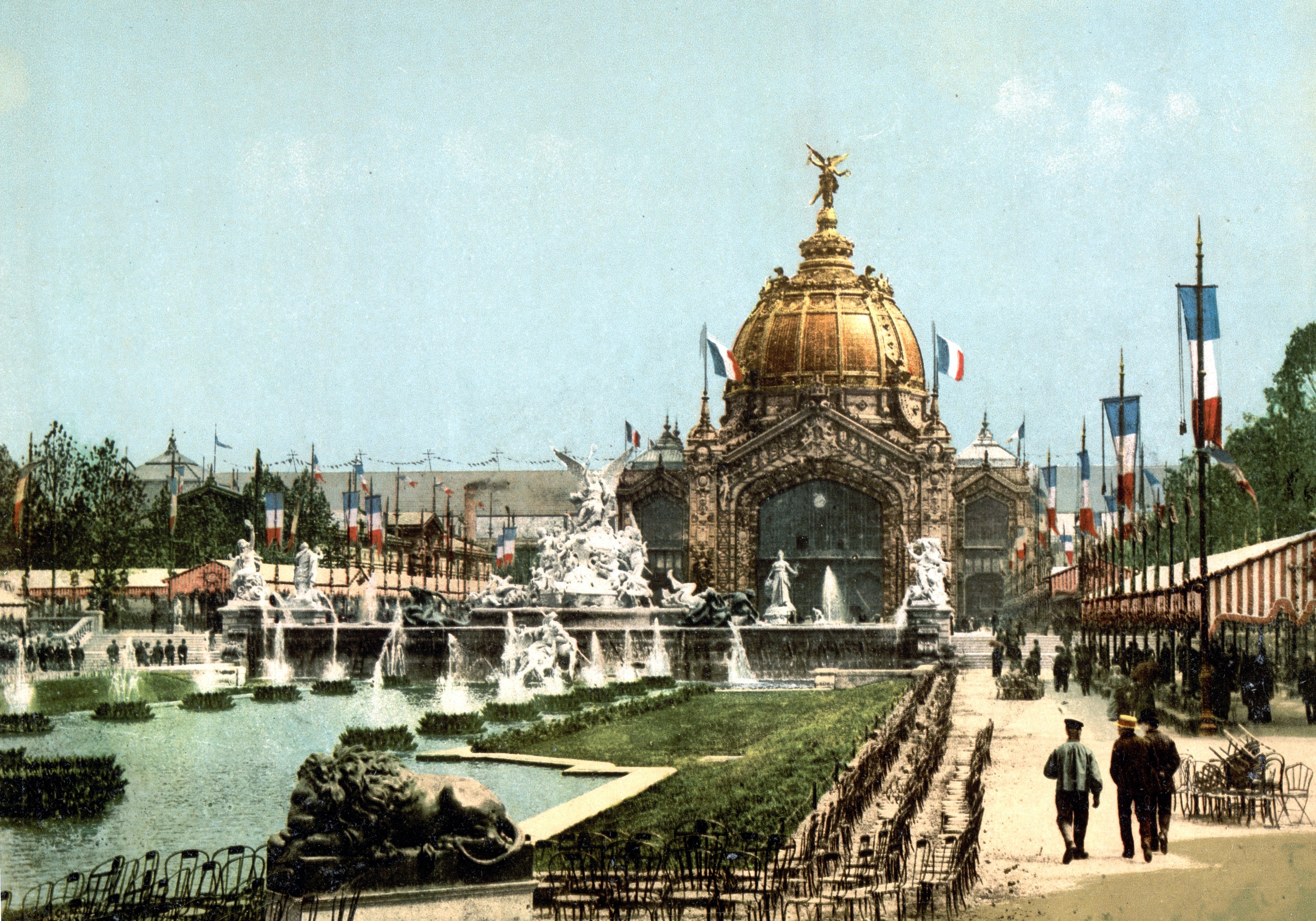
View of the Central Dome

== Structures ==
=== The Eiffel Tower ===
The Eiffel Tower, built especially for the exposition, was the tallest structure in the world at the time. A competition to build what was simply called "A tower of three hundred meters" with a base one hundred meters wide, was announced in 1886. It was won by the construction firm of Gustave Eiffel, which had recently built the iron frame of the Statue of Liberty. The Eiffel firm had advance knowledge of the project and, beginning in 1884, had already designed a tower exactly to those dimensions. The structural design was created by two Eiffel engineers, Maurice Koechlin and Émile Nouguier, who along with Eiffel himself, received the patent for the plan. An Eiffel architect, Stephen Sauvestre, designed the curving form and decoration which gave the tower its distinctive appearance. Eiffel was granted exclusive rights for twenty years to operate the tower and its restaurants and viewing platforms. A site next to the River was chosen, despite the infiltration of river water, since that land was owned by the City of Paris, and the tower could be kept in place after the exposition was completed.

The construction lasted two years, two months and five days, and involved five hundred workers, who assembled eighteen thousand iron pieces, each of five meters and carefully numbered, which had been made at a factory in Levallois-Perret, a Paris suburb. Speaking of the tower construction workers, the son-in-law of Eiffel, declared, "no soldier on the battle field deserved better mention than these humble toilers, who, will never go down in history." During the exposition, no one other than construction personnel were allowed higher than the second viewing platform.

In the first week of the exposition, 29,922 persons climbed the tower to the viewing platform, though the elevators were not yet in service, and they had to climb by a narrow winding stairway. By the time the exposition finished, after 173 days, 1,968,287 persons had ascended the tower.

When the exposition ended, the tower was used for a time as a weather station. In 1904, Eiffel proposed to the French military that a radio transmitter, designed by the pioneer radio engineer Edouard Branly, be placed on the third level. In 1909, when Eiffel's concession formally ended, it was decided to preserve the Tower permanently.

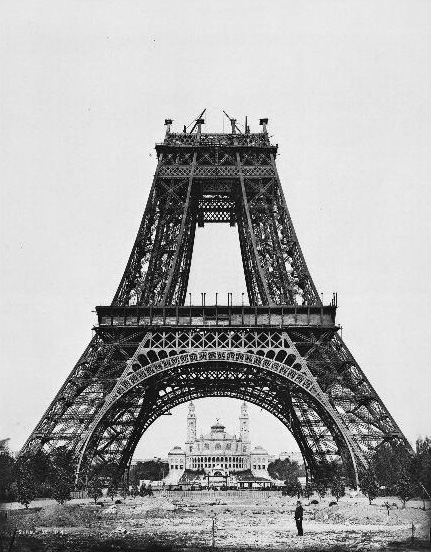
The tower under construction a year before the opening (1888)

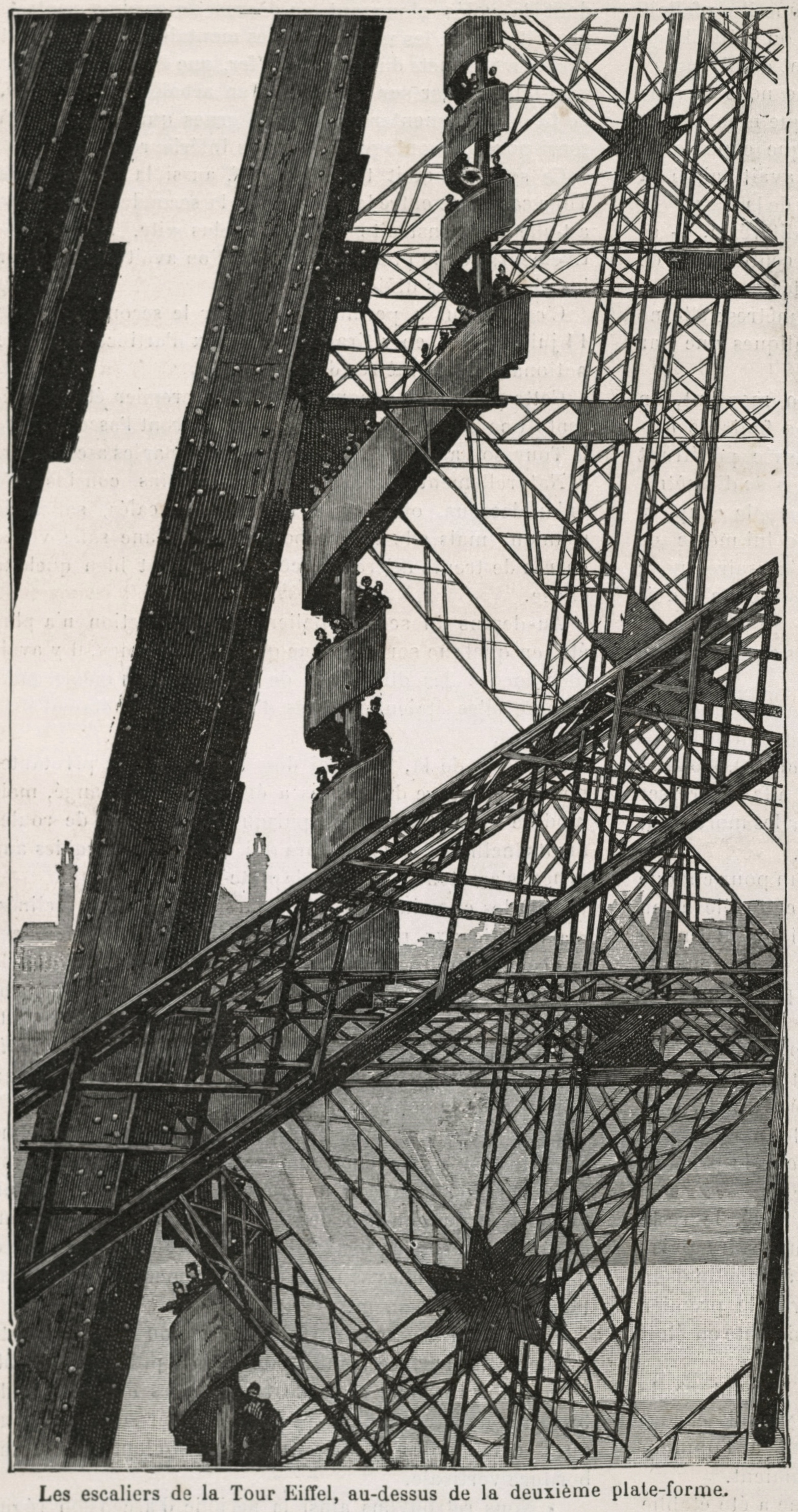
Stairway to the viewing level

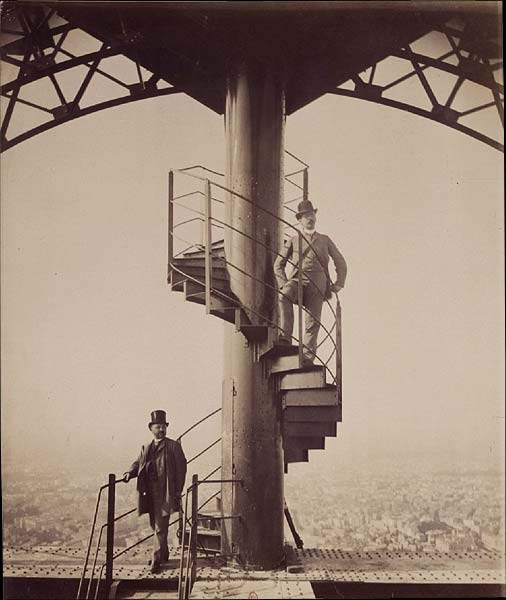
Gustave Eiffel (left) posing on the stairway of his tower

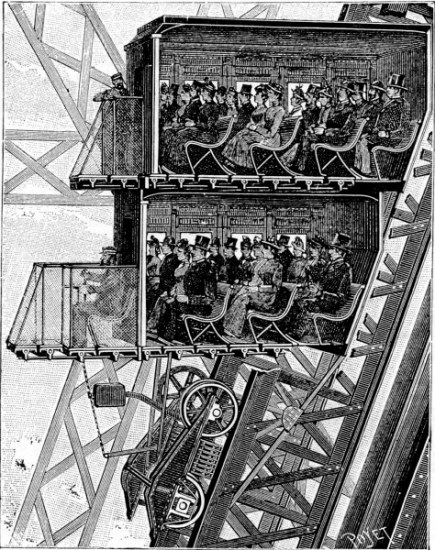
The Otis elevators that carried visitors up the north and south legs of the tower

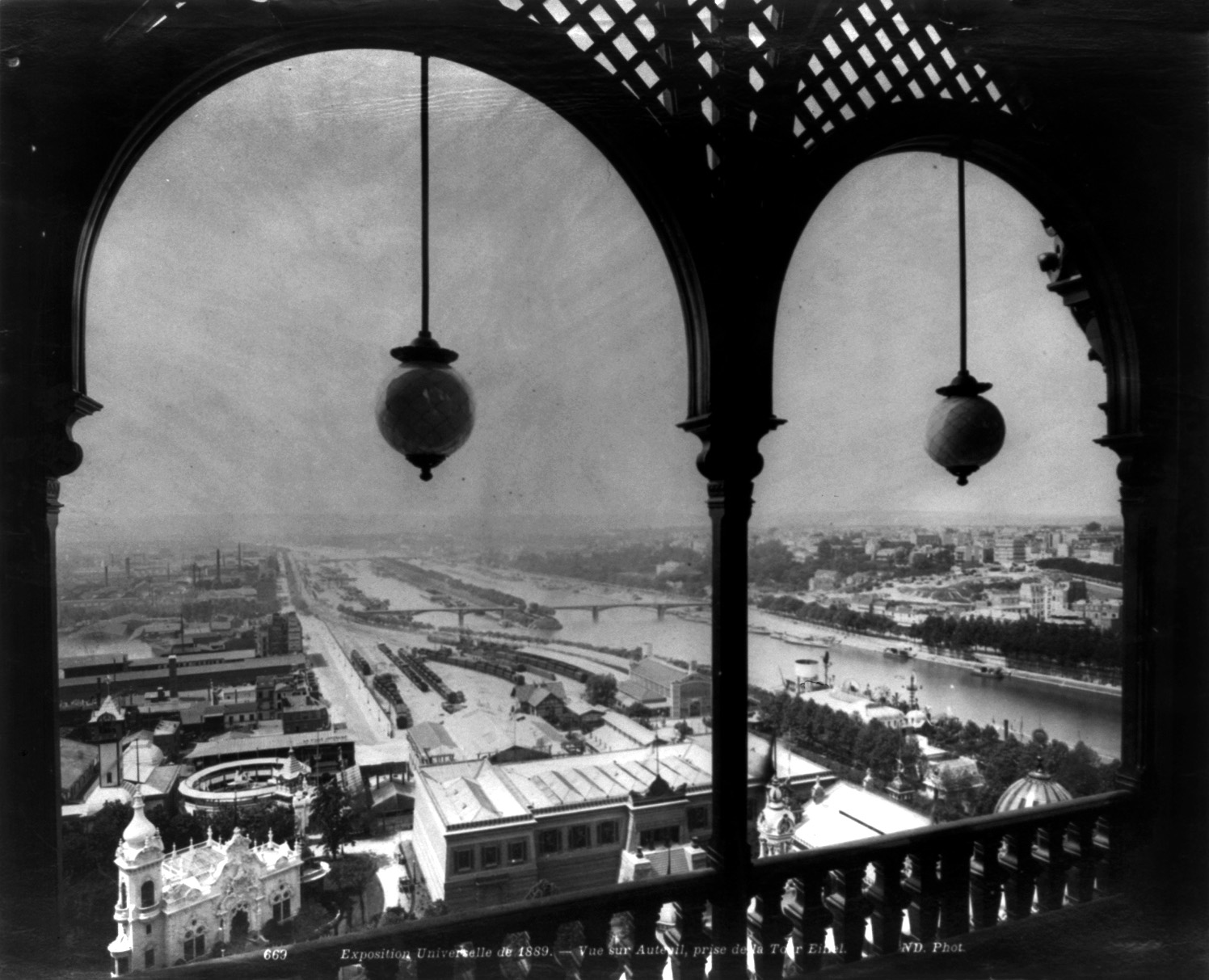
View of the Seine and the exposition from the Eiffel Tower

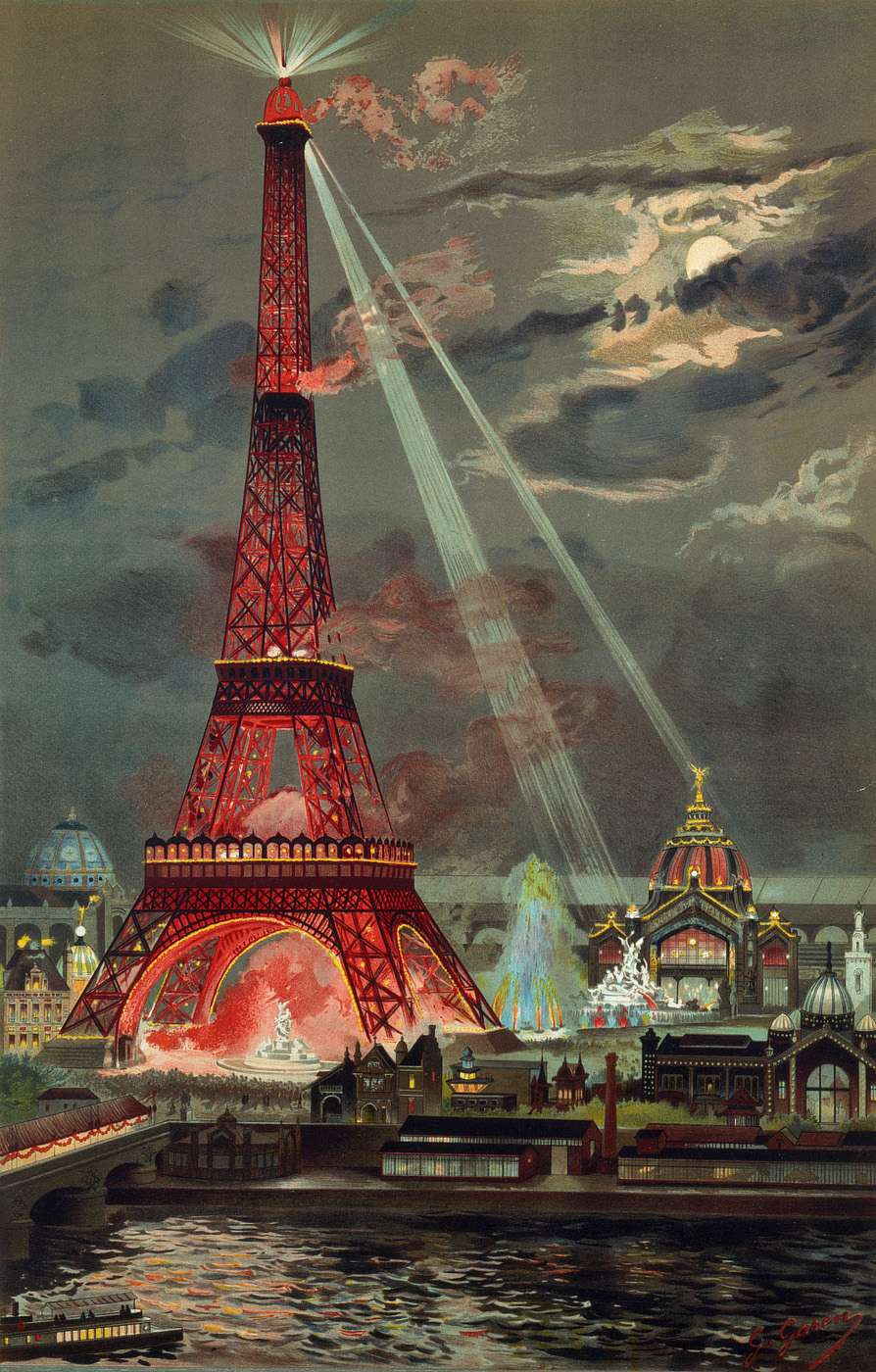
Chromolithograph by George Garen of the Eiffel Tower illuminations (1889)

=== The Galerie des Machines ===
A second monumental building on the site was the Galerie des machines, by the engineer Victor Contamin and the architect Ferdinand Dutert, which had originally been built for the 1878 Universal Exposition. It was a huge iron and glass structure which contained the industrial displays. It occupied the entire width of the exposition site, the land between the avenue de la Bourdonnais and the present avenue de Suffren, and covered 77,000 square meters, with 34,700 square meters of glass windows. At 111 meters, the Gallery covered the longest interior space in the world at the time, It cost 7,430,000 Francs, or seven times the cost of the Eiffel Tower. It was later used again at the 1900 Universal Exposition and then destroyed in 1910.

The Galerie des Machines used a system of hinged arches (like a series of bridge spans placed not end-to-end but parallel) made of steel or iron. Although often described as being constructed of steel, it was actually made of iron.

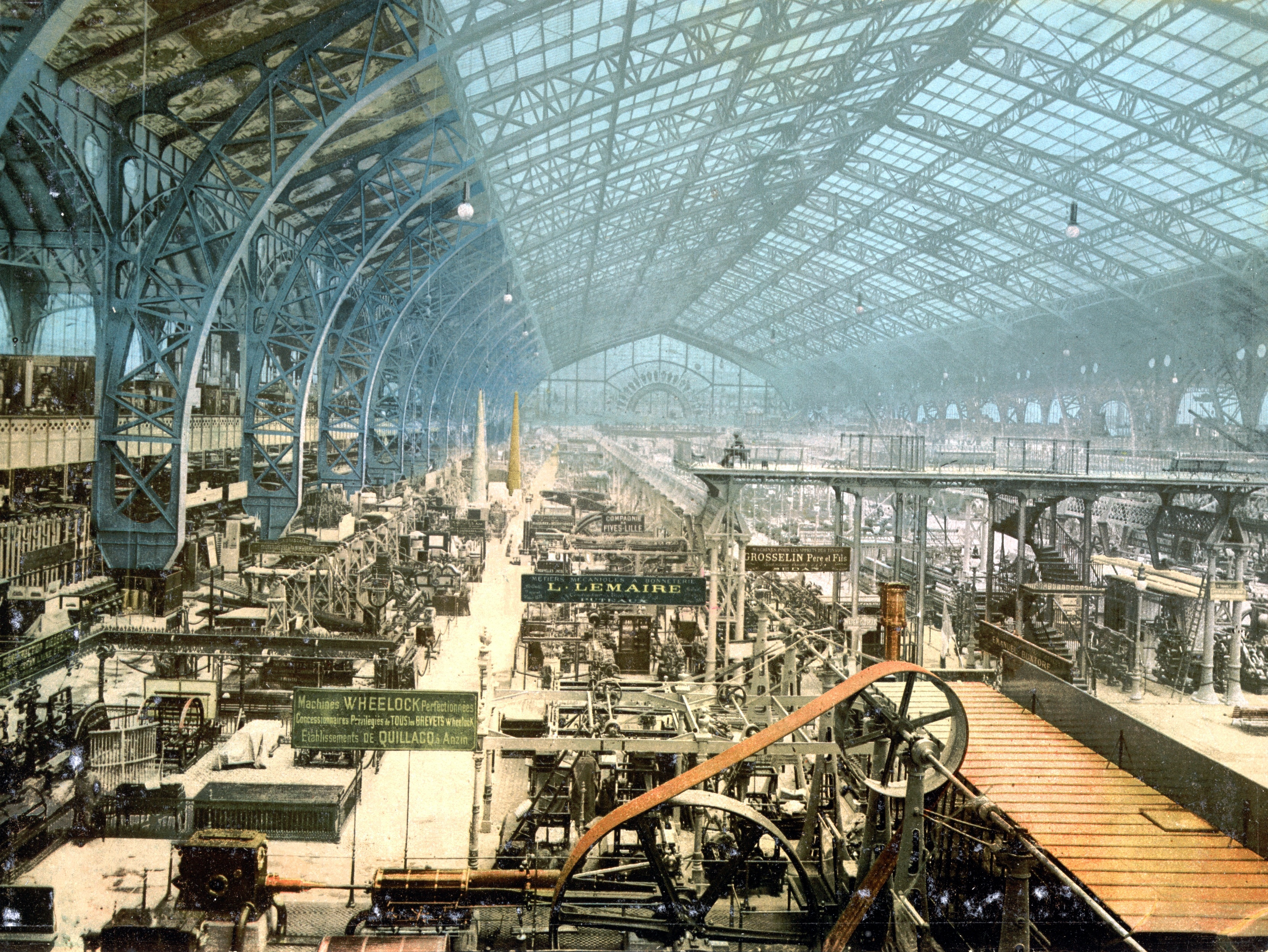
Interior of the Galerie des machines (1889), built by Victor Contamin and Ferdinand Dutert.

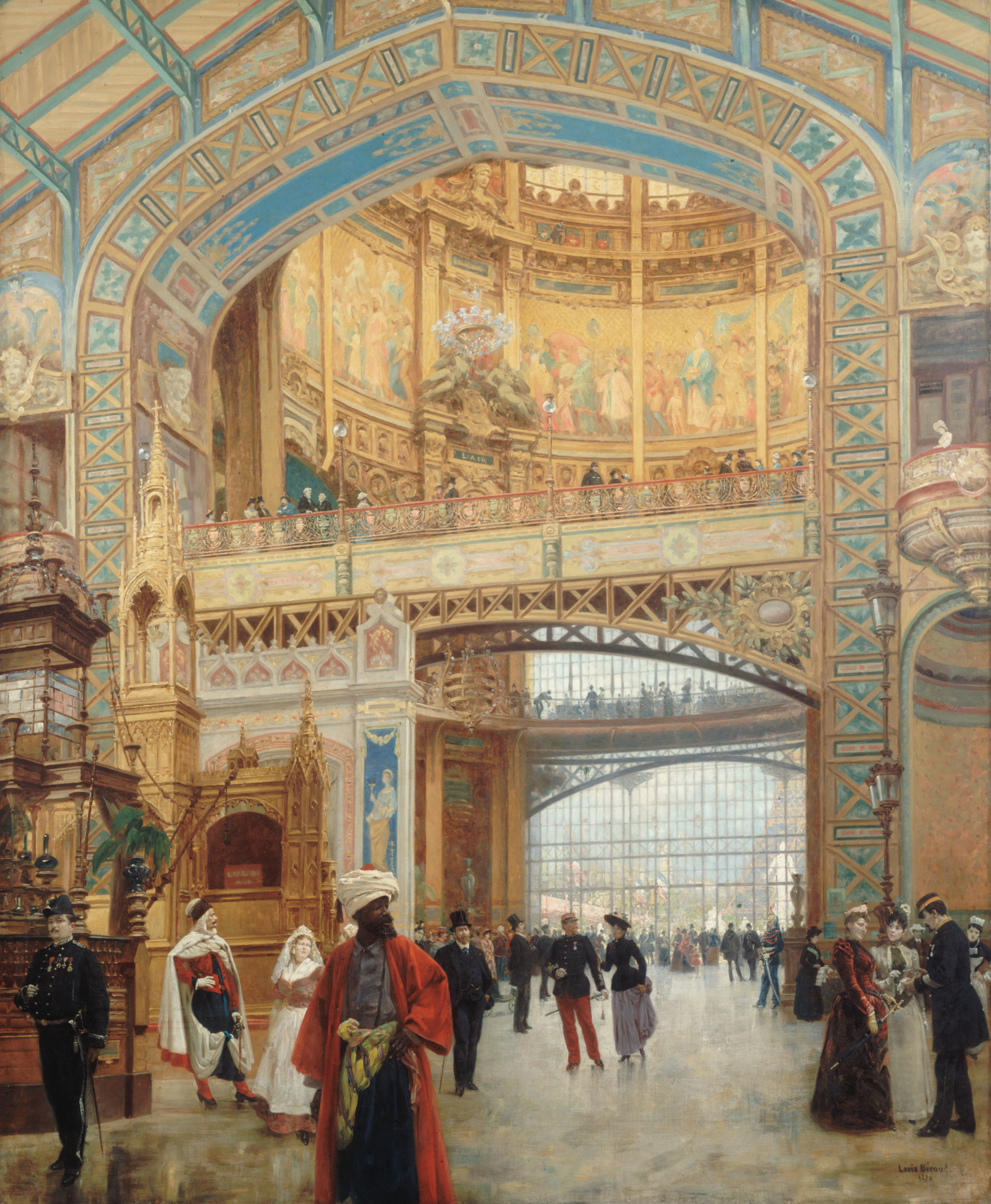
Interior of the central dome of the Galerie des machines, by Louis Béroud (1889)

=== Science and technology ===
One important goal of the exposition was to present the latest in science and technology. Thomas Edison visited the exposition to visit a pavilion devoted to his recent inventions, including an improved phonograph with clearer sound quality.

Another new technology that was promoted at the exposition was the safety elevator, developed by a new American company, Otis Elevator. Otis built the elevators carrying passengers up the legs of the Eiffel Tower to the first level. When journalists expressed concern about the safety of the elevators, Otis technicians filled one elevator with three thousand kilograms of lead, simulating passengers, and then, with journalists from around the world watching, cut the cable with an axe. The elevator's fall was halted ten feet above the ground by the Otis safety brakes.

There were pavilions especially devoted to the telephone and to electricity, and others devoted to maritime navigation, and another, the Palais de Guerre or Palace of War, to developments in military technology, such as naval artillery.

Prefabricated metal housing was another technology that appeared at the exposition. Gustave Eiffel developed a series of houses with roof and walls of galvanised steel, and wooden interiors, which could be rapidly put together or taken apart, largely for use in French colony of Indochina. Some of them served as ticket booths at the 1889 exposition; one of these old booths, now used as a shelter for hikers, can now be found in the Forest of Dampierre.

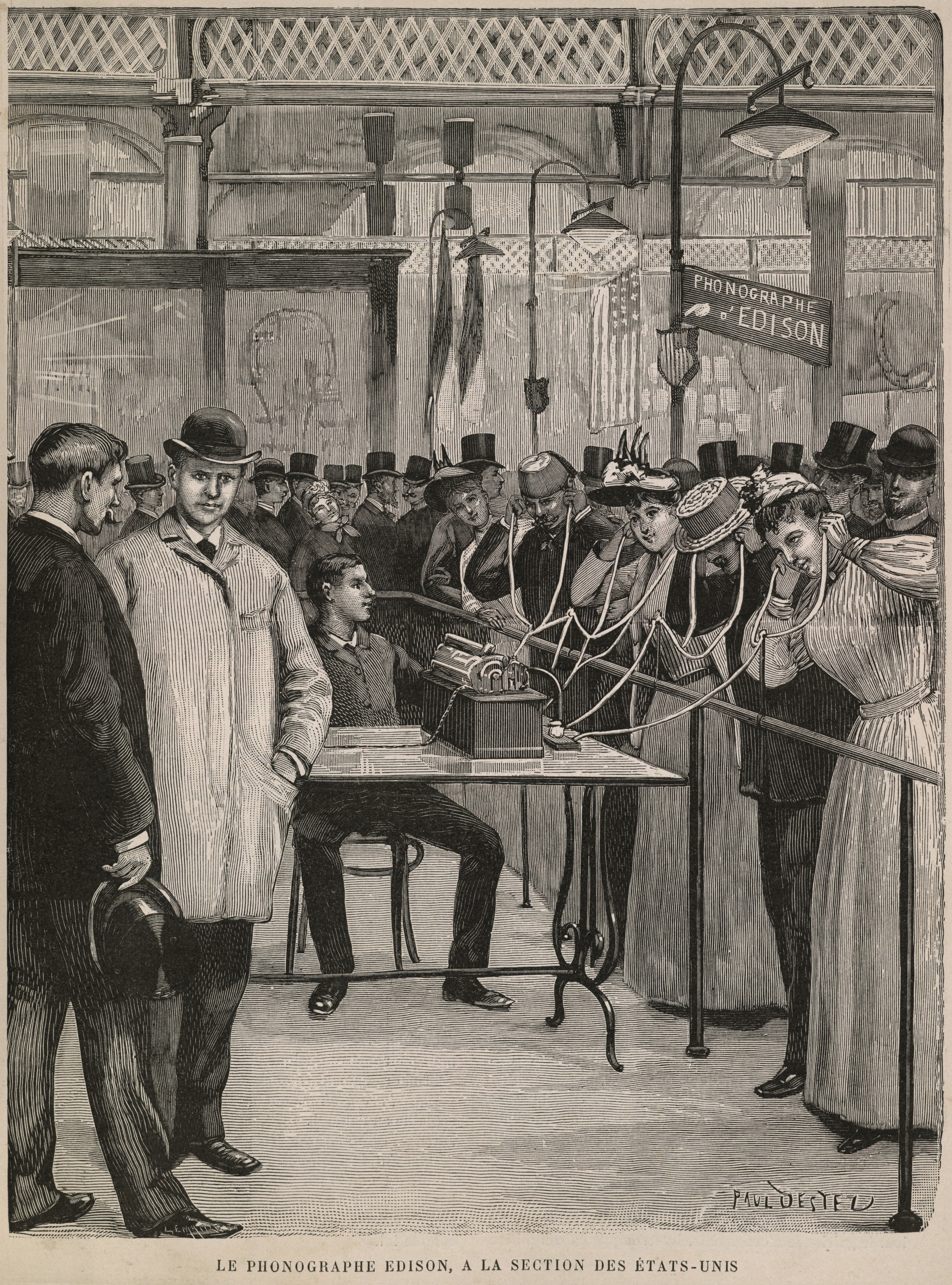
Edison phonograph demonstrated at the exposition

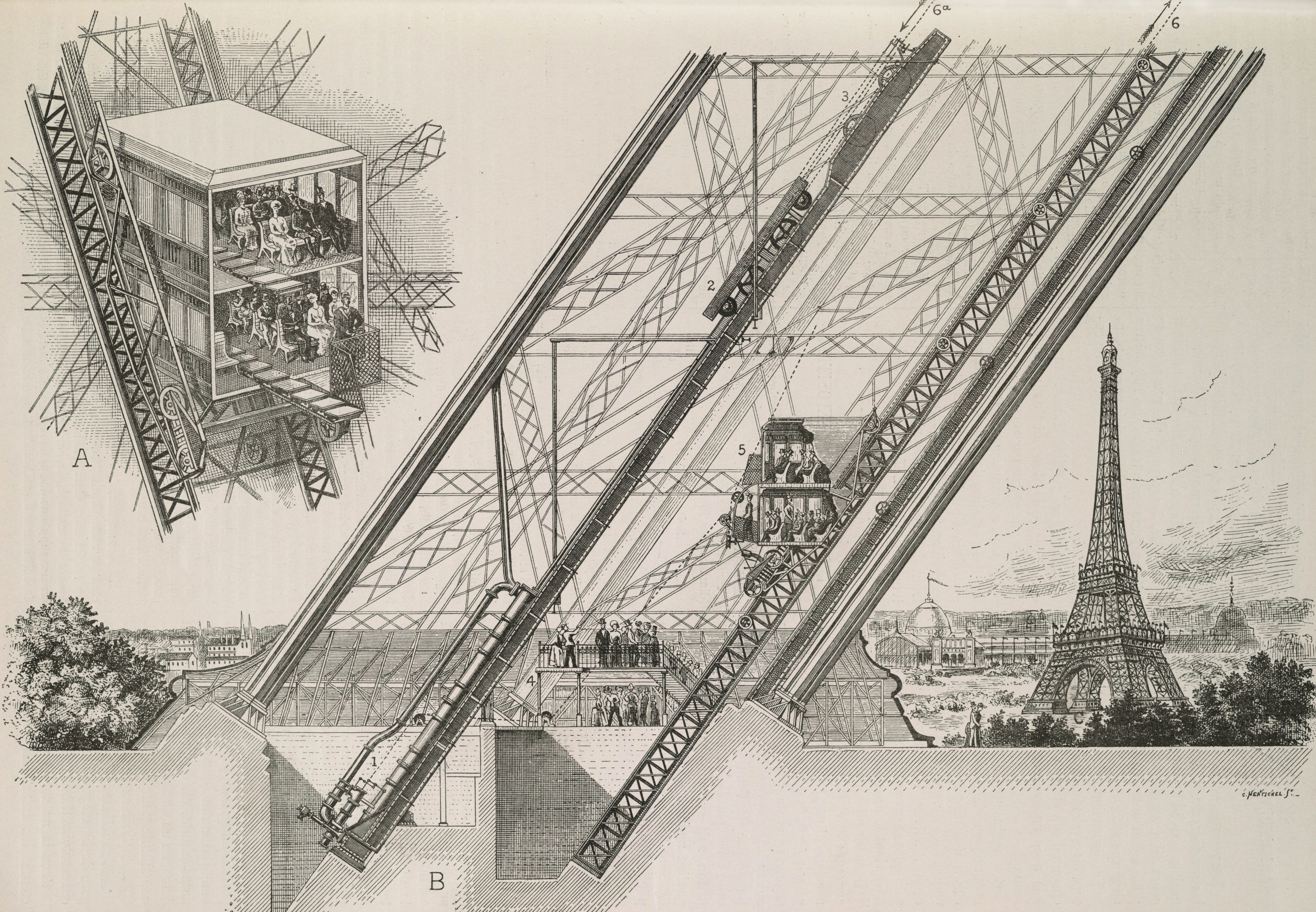
Otis Elevators carrying passengers up the legs of the Eiffel Tower

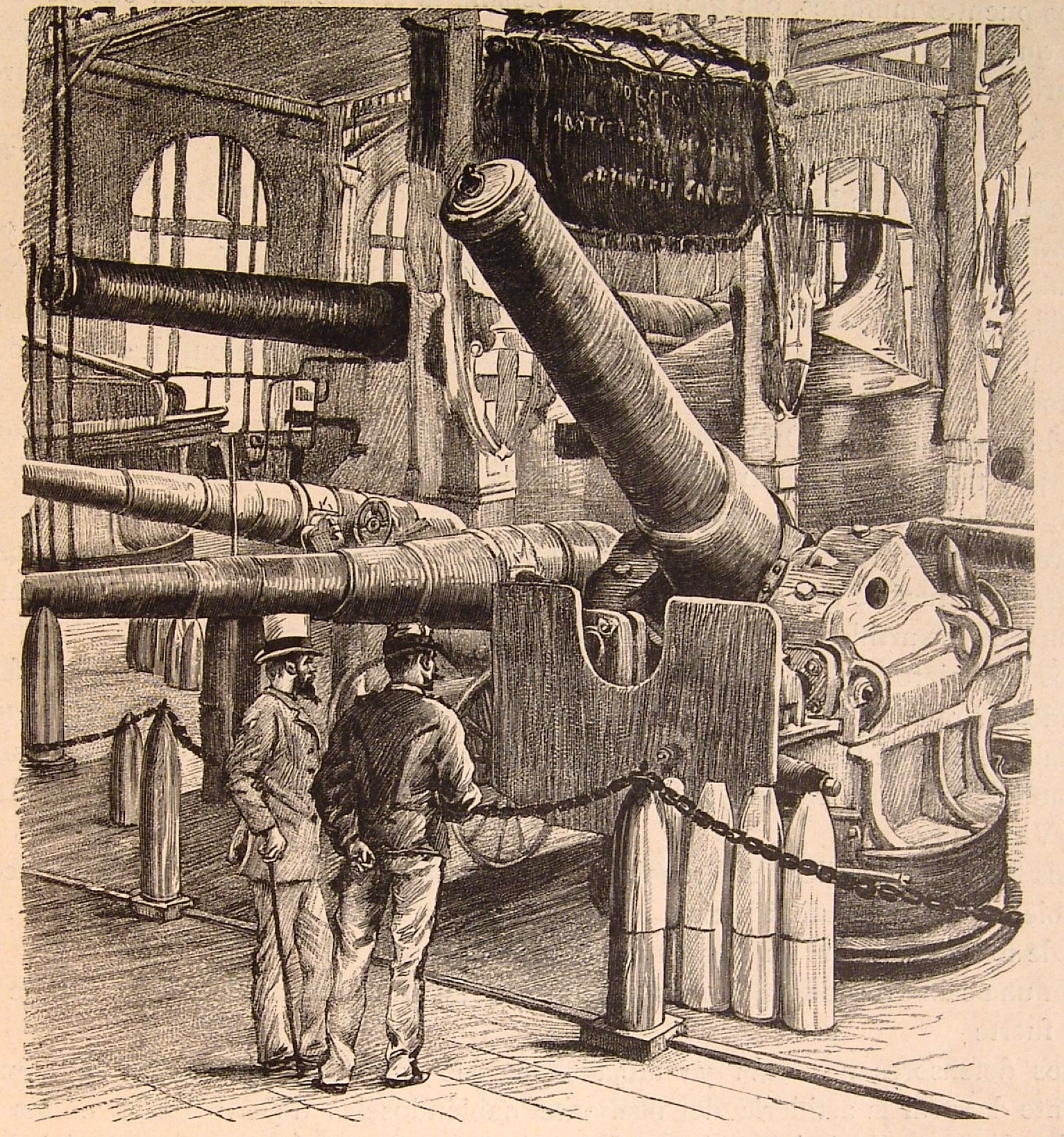
Exhibit of naval artillery in the Palace of War

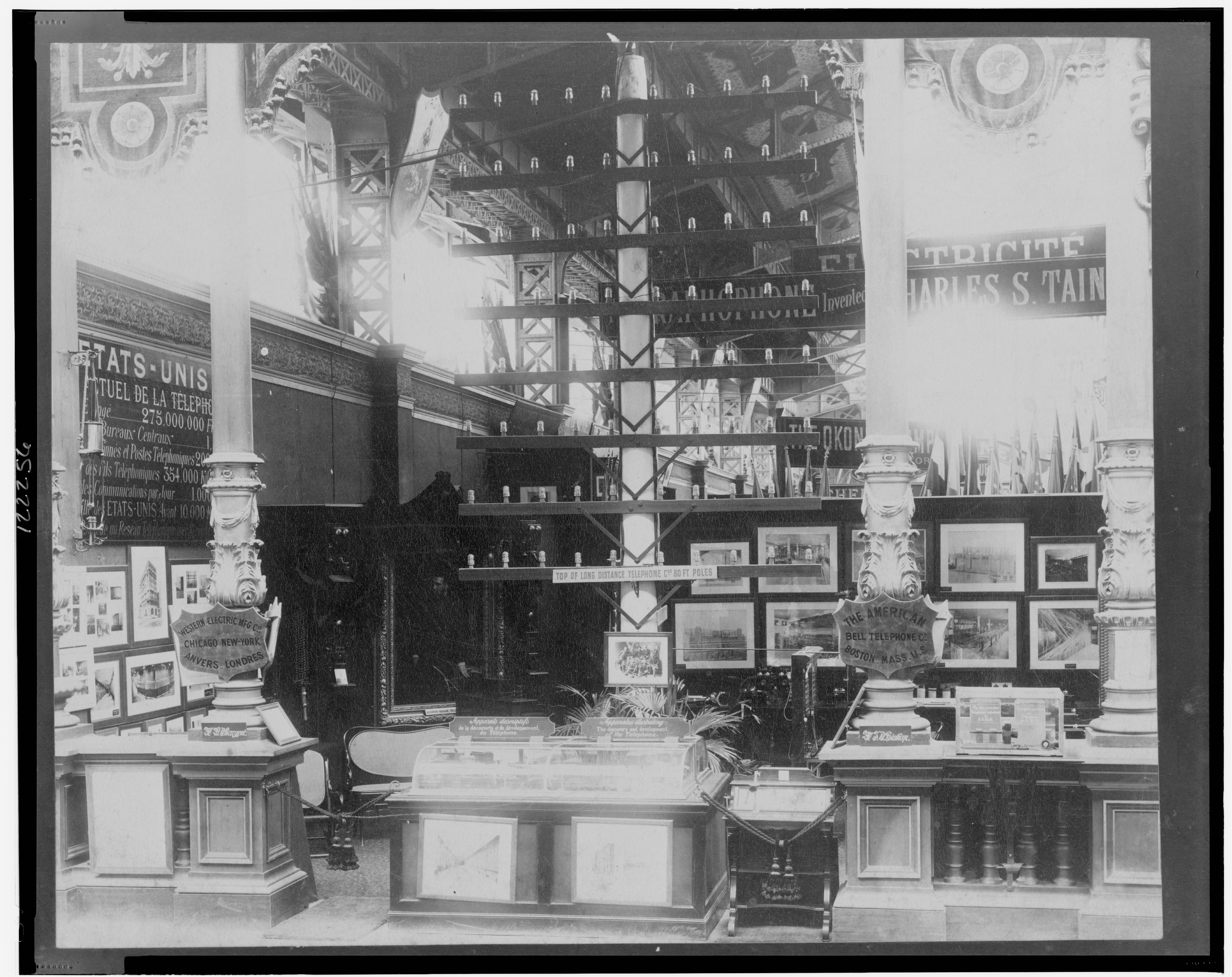
Exhibit of Bell Telephone and the Western Electric Company at the exposition

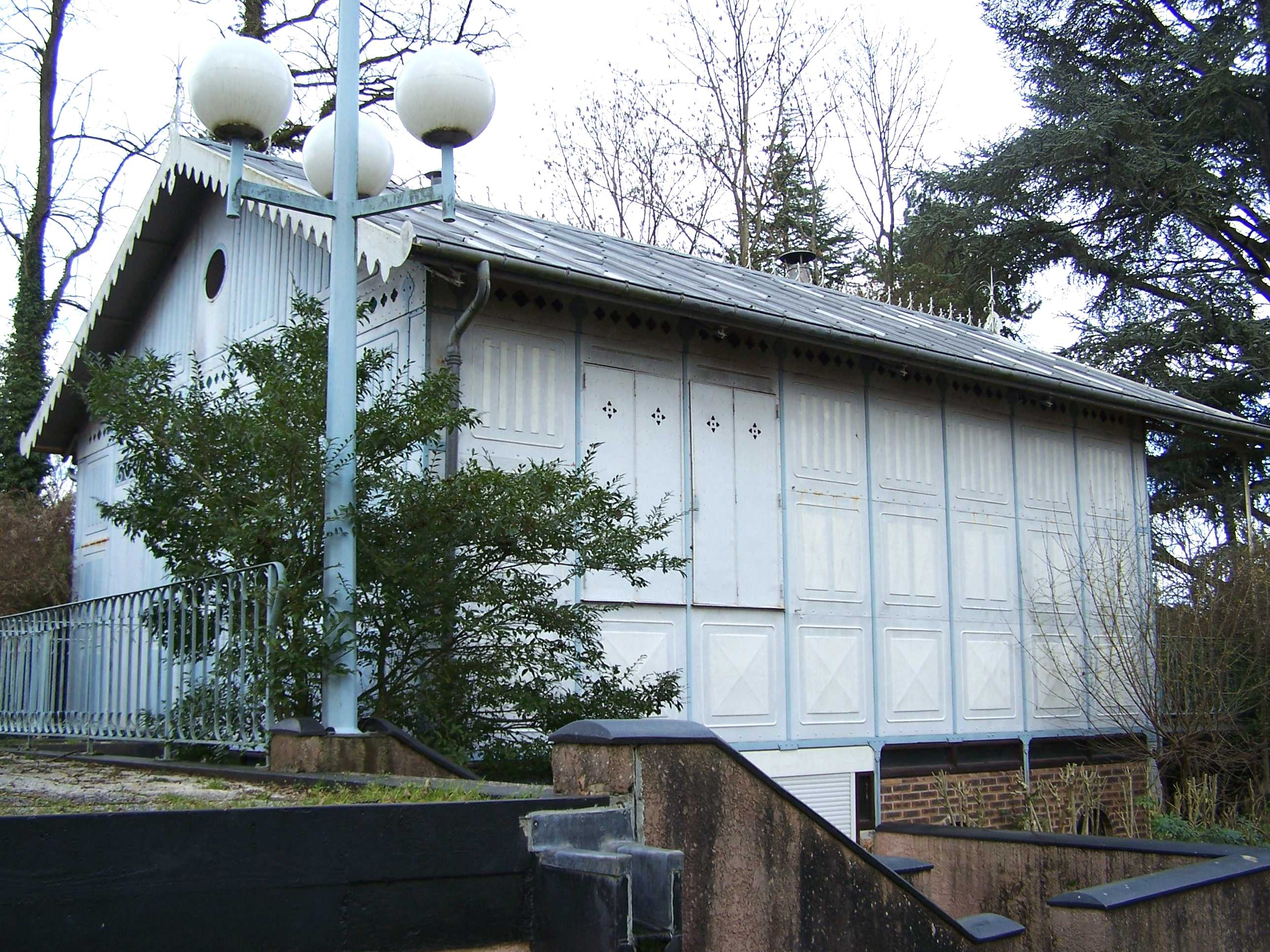
The "Iron House", a prefabricated galvanized steel house designed by Gustave Eiffel, used as a ticket booth in the exposition, now a park shelter in Dampierre

=== The Palaces of Fine Arts and Liberal Arts ===
Other major buildings included the Palaces of Liberal and Fine Arts, each with a richly decorated dome, facing each other across a garden and reflecting pool between the Eiffel Tower and the Palace of Machines. Both were designed by Jean-Camille Formigé with a similar plan. Both buildings had modern iron frames abundance of glass, but were completely covered with colorful ceramic tiles and sculpted decoration.

The exposition included a building by the Paris architect Pierre-Henri Picq. This was an elaborate iron and glass structure decorated with ceramic tiles in a Byzantine-Egyptian-Romanesque style. After the exposition the building was shipped to Fort de France and reassembled there, the work being completed by 1893. Known as the Schœlcher Library, initially it contained the 10,000 books that Victor Schœlcher had donated to the island. Today, it houses over 250,000 books and an ethnographic museum, and stands as a tribute to the man it is named after who led the movement to abolish slavery in Martinique.

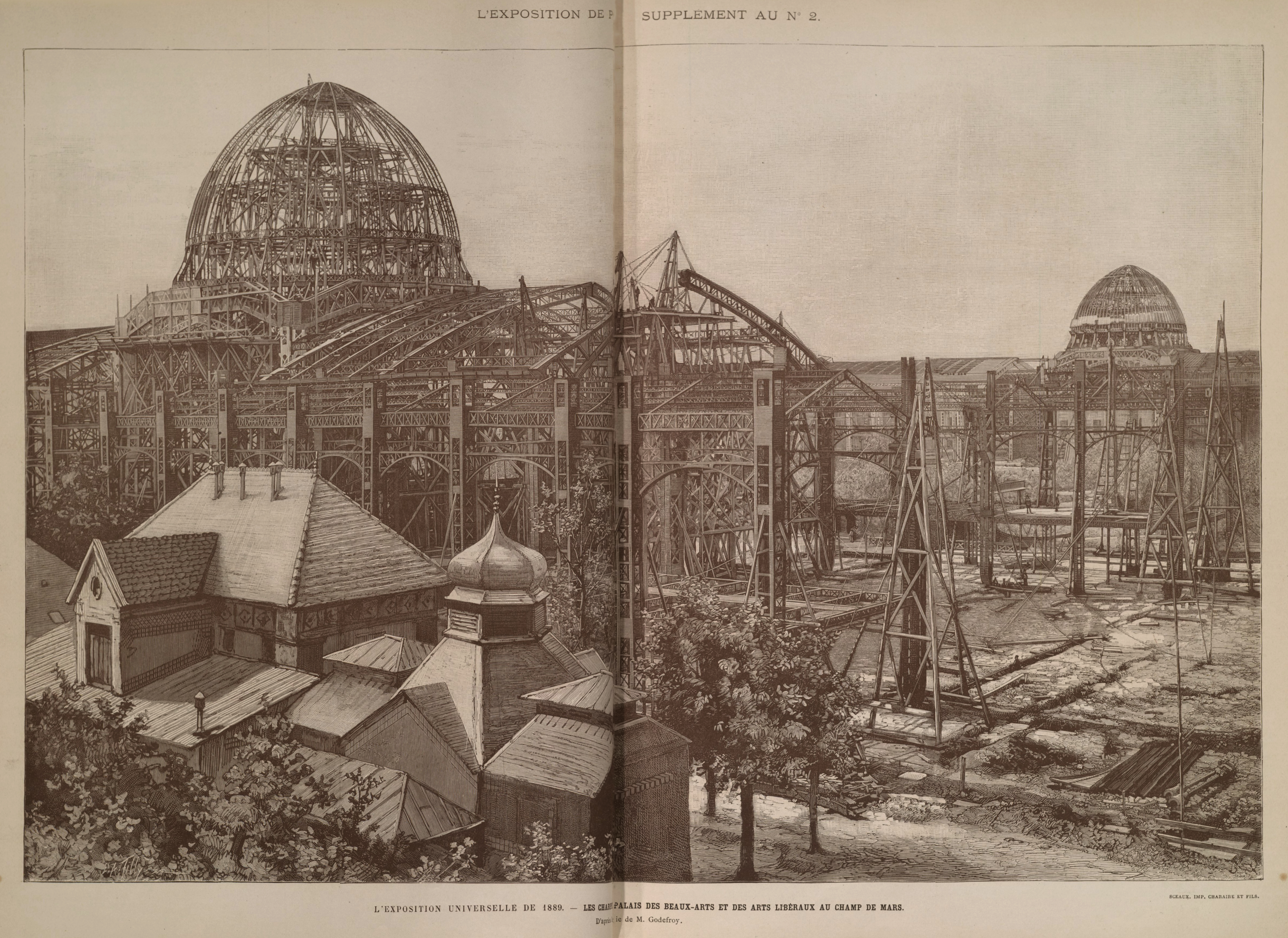
The Palaces of Fine Arts and Liberal Arts under construction, both designed by Jean-Camille Formigé

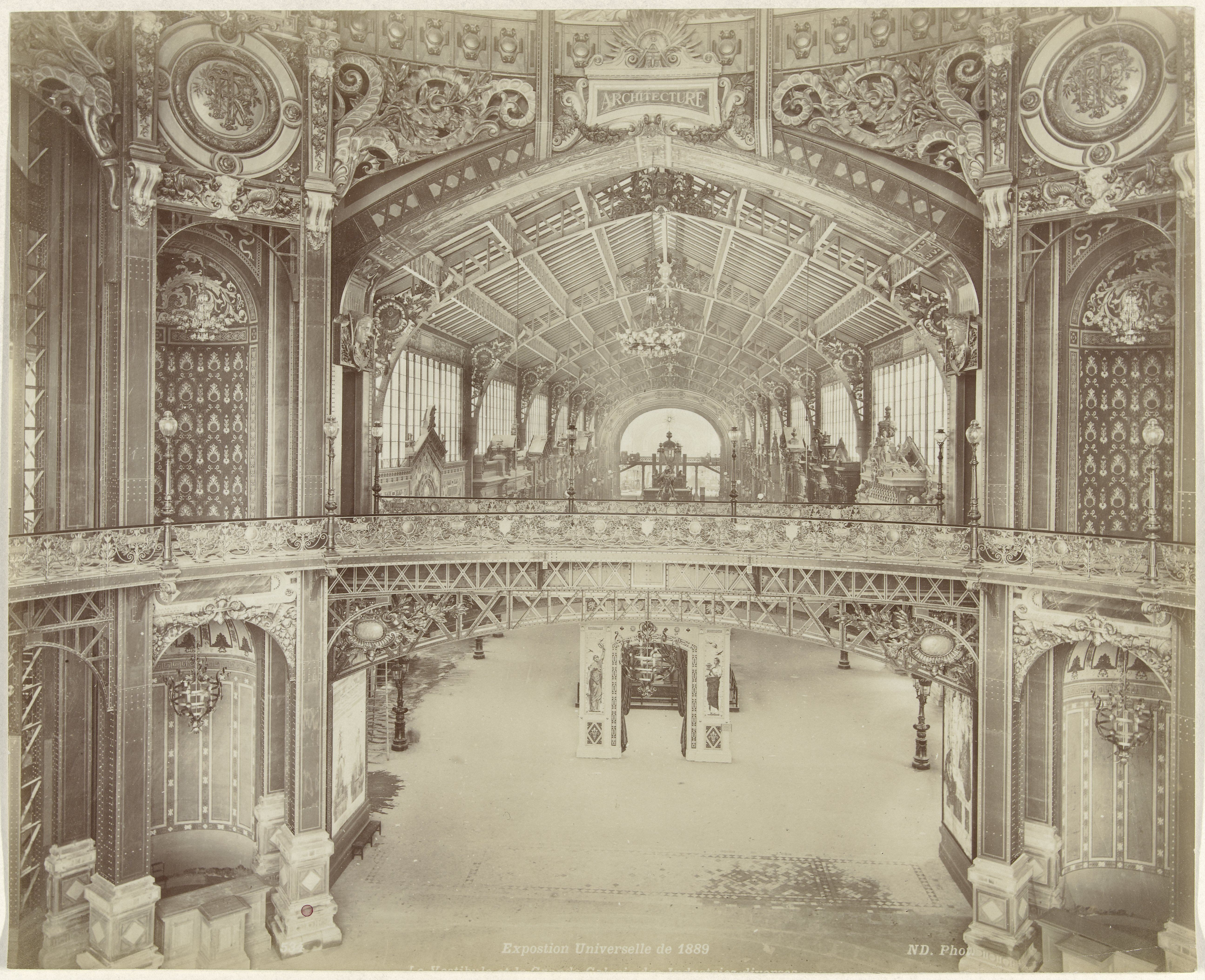
Interior of the Palace of Fine Arts by Jean-Camille Formigé

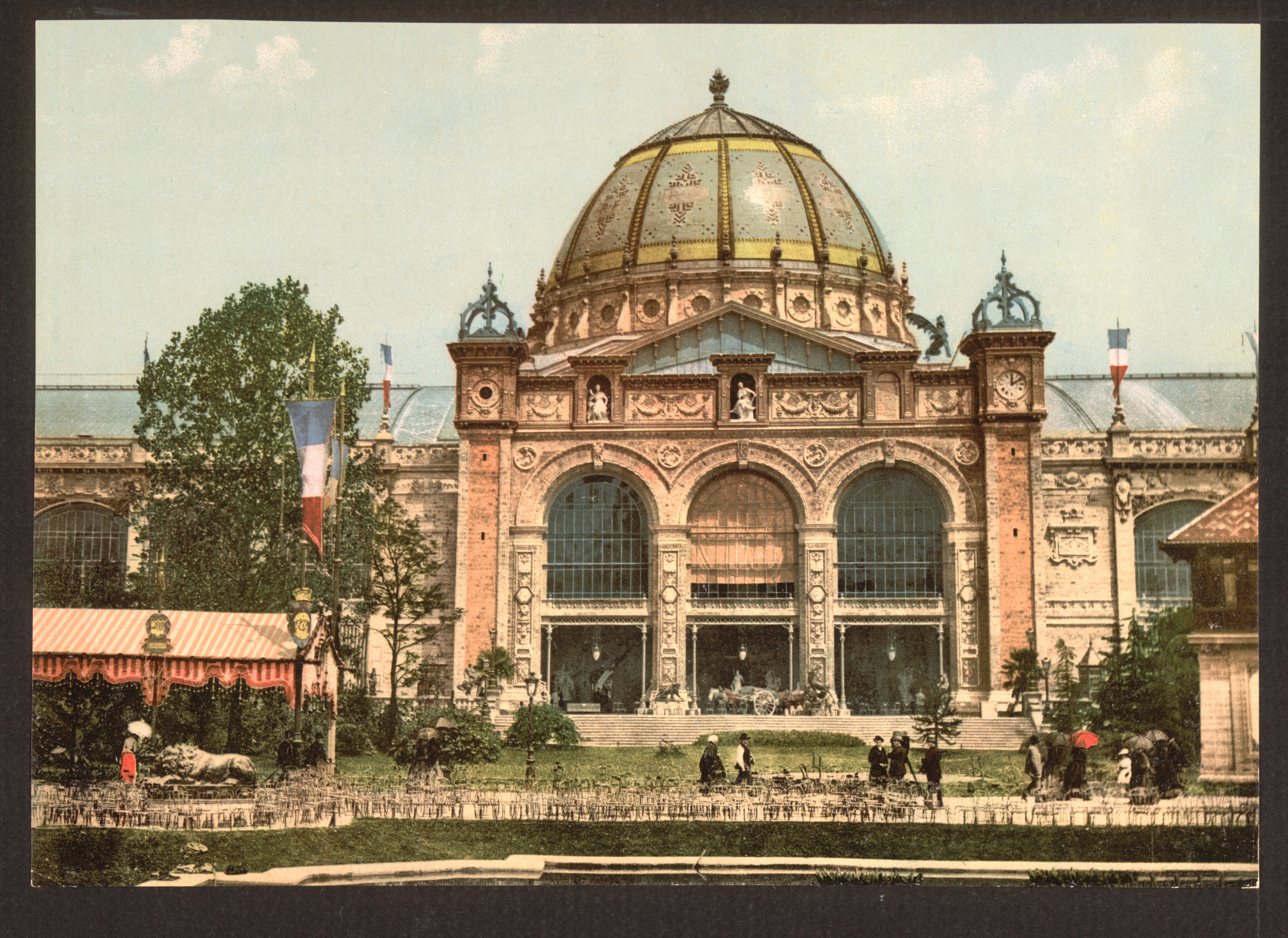
The Palace of Fine Arts

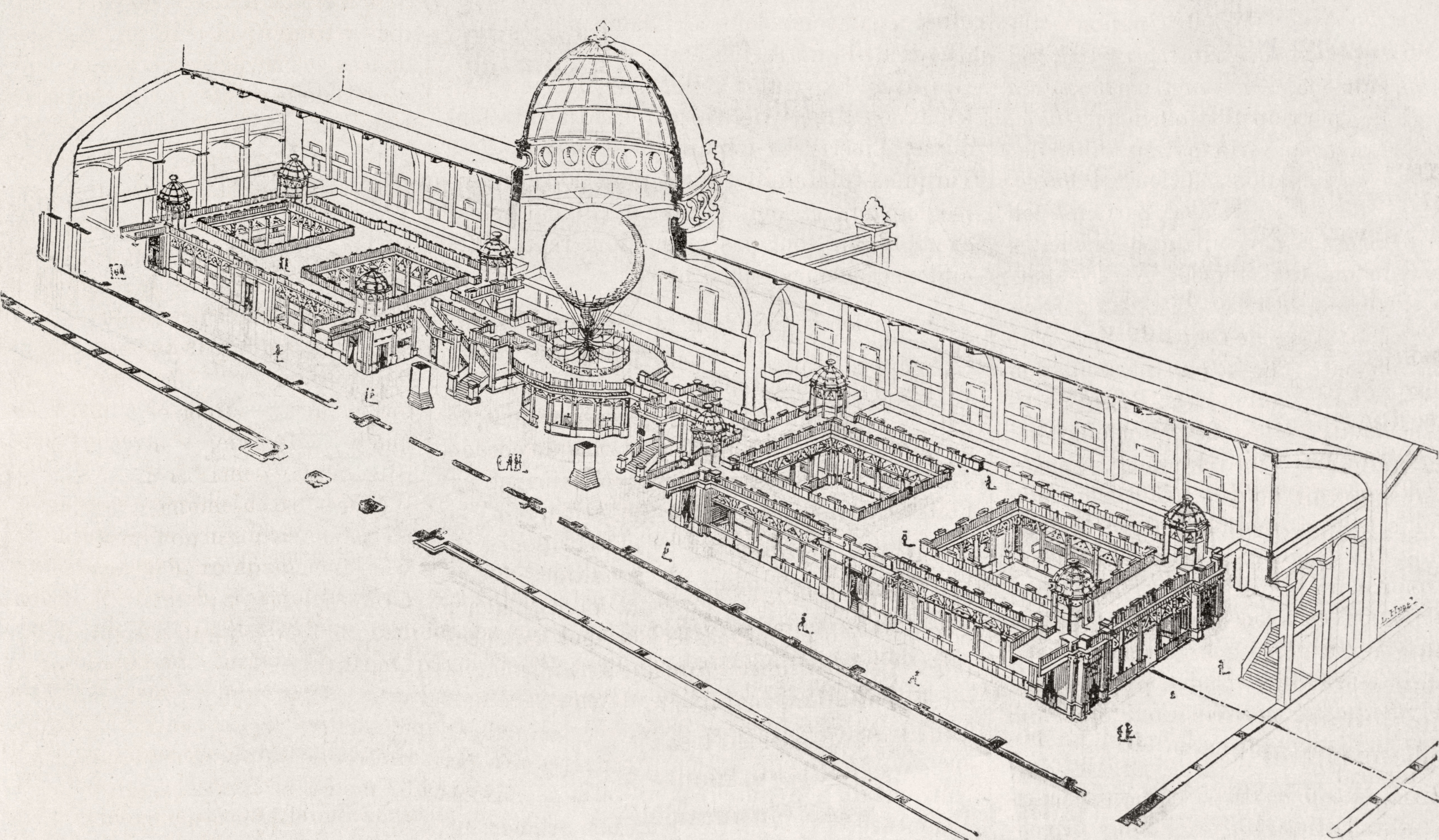
Interior of the Palace of Liberal Arts

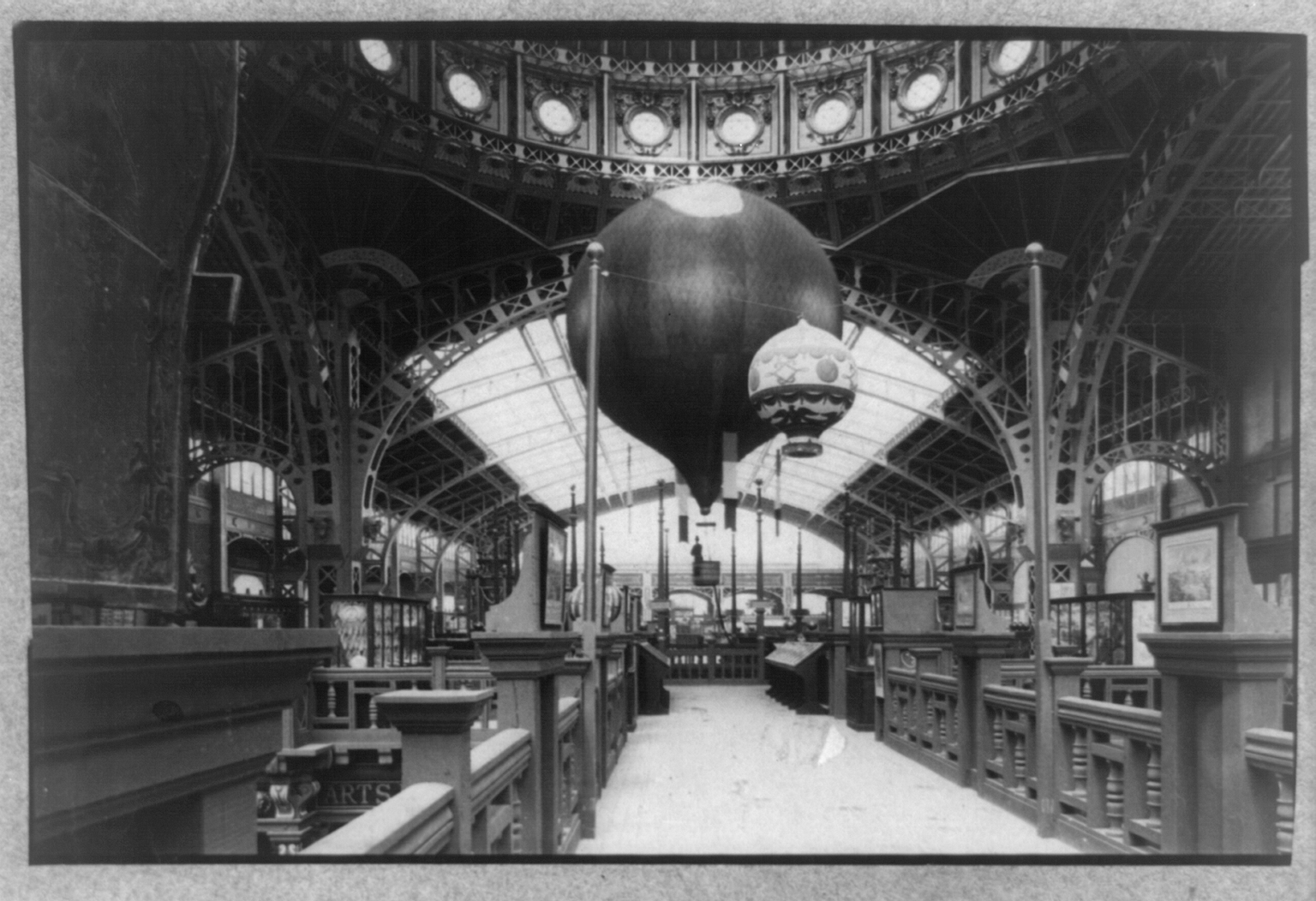
Interior of the Palace of Liberal Arts, with balloons

=== Fountains ===
The exposition featured numerous fountains and reflecting pools, particularly in the mall that ran between the Eiffel Tower and the Palace of Machines. The largest fountain, near the Eiffel Tower, was entitled "The City of Paris enlightens the world with its torch." The fountain was designed by Jean-Camille Formigé, who designed the nearby Palaces of Fine Arts and Liberal Arts. The other major fountain, not far away, was "The Five Parts of the World", illustrating the continents. It was designed by Francis de Saint-Vidal.

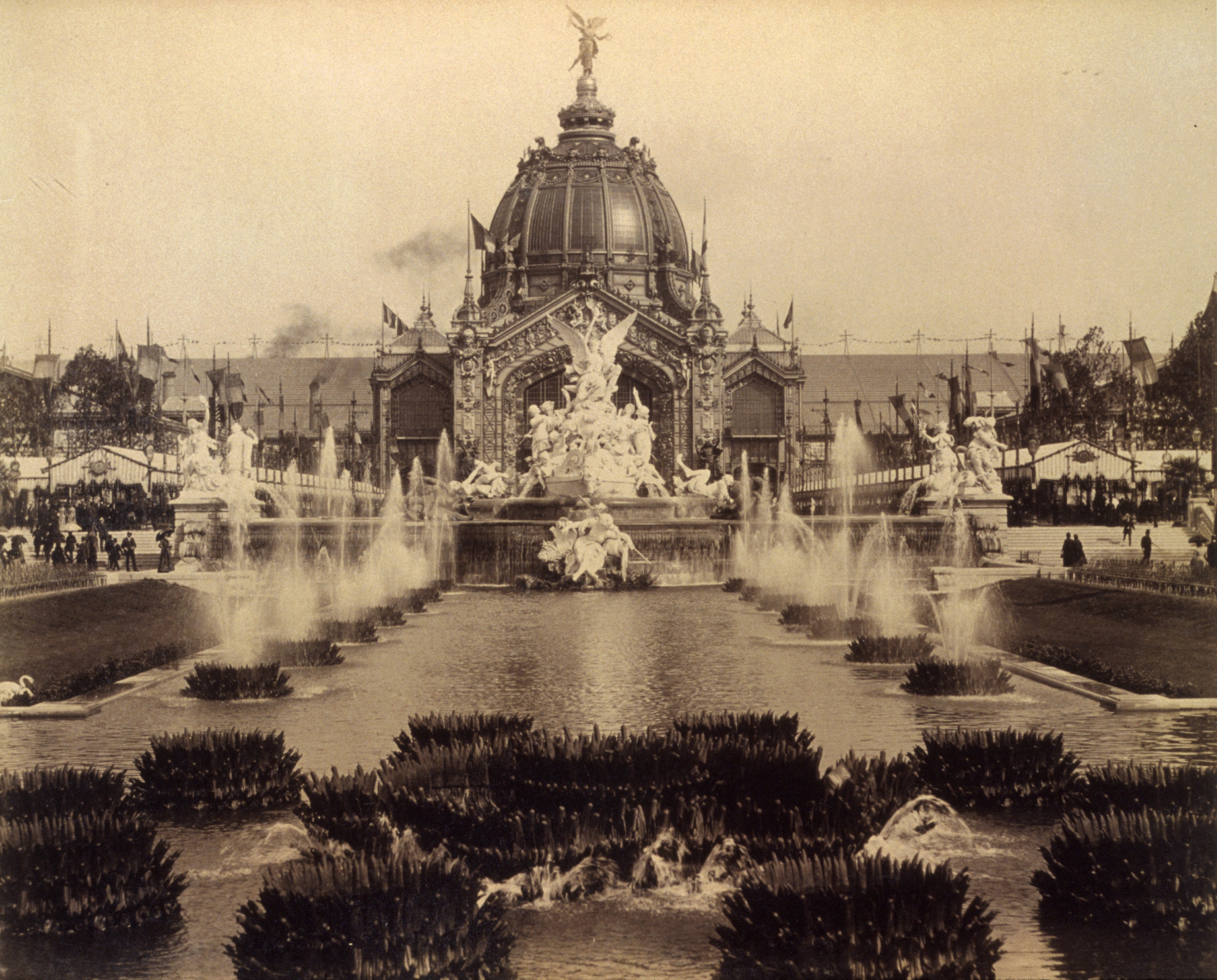
The Coutan Fountain and central dome

=== The "Street of Cairo" and exotic habitations ===
The Rue de Caire ("Street of Cairo") was a popular attraction designed to recreate the architecture and street life of Cairo. It provided a striking contrast to the very modern Palace of Machines, next to it. It was the idea of Baron Delort Gléon, an art collector and specialist in Egyptian art, with financial support from Charles De Lesseps, the head of the Egyptian committee for the exposition, and son of Ferdinand De Lesseps, the builder of the Suez Canal. It was a winding street, with buildings at odd angles, and featured, among other buildings, a minaret, two mosques, a school and two ornamental gateways. The doors, windows, and architectural fittings and decoration were real, imported from demolished buildings in Cairo. The street was populated by real Egyptians in costumes, including musicians, belly dancers, artists, craftsmen, and vendors of various Egyptian foods and delicacies.

The exposition featured several other examples of picturesque habitations and villages from around the world, including a Javanese village and recreated houses of villages from Senegal, Benin, and other colonies, with costumed residents.

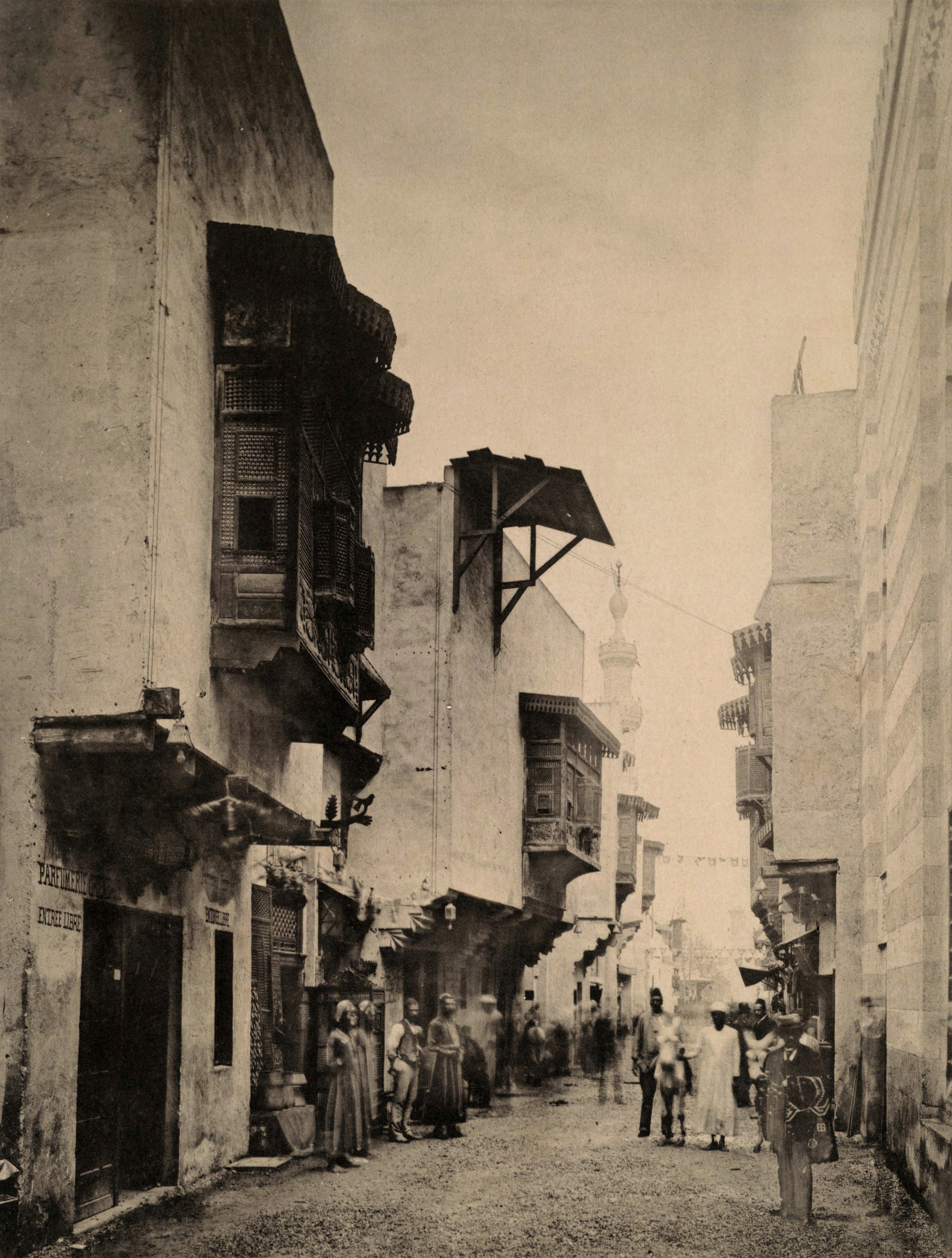
The "Cairo Street"

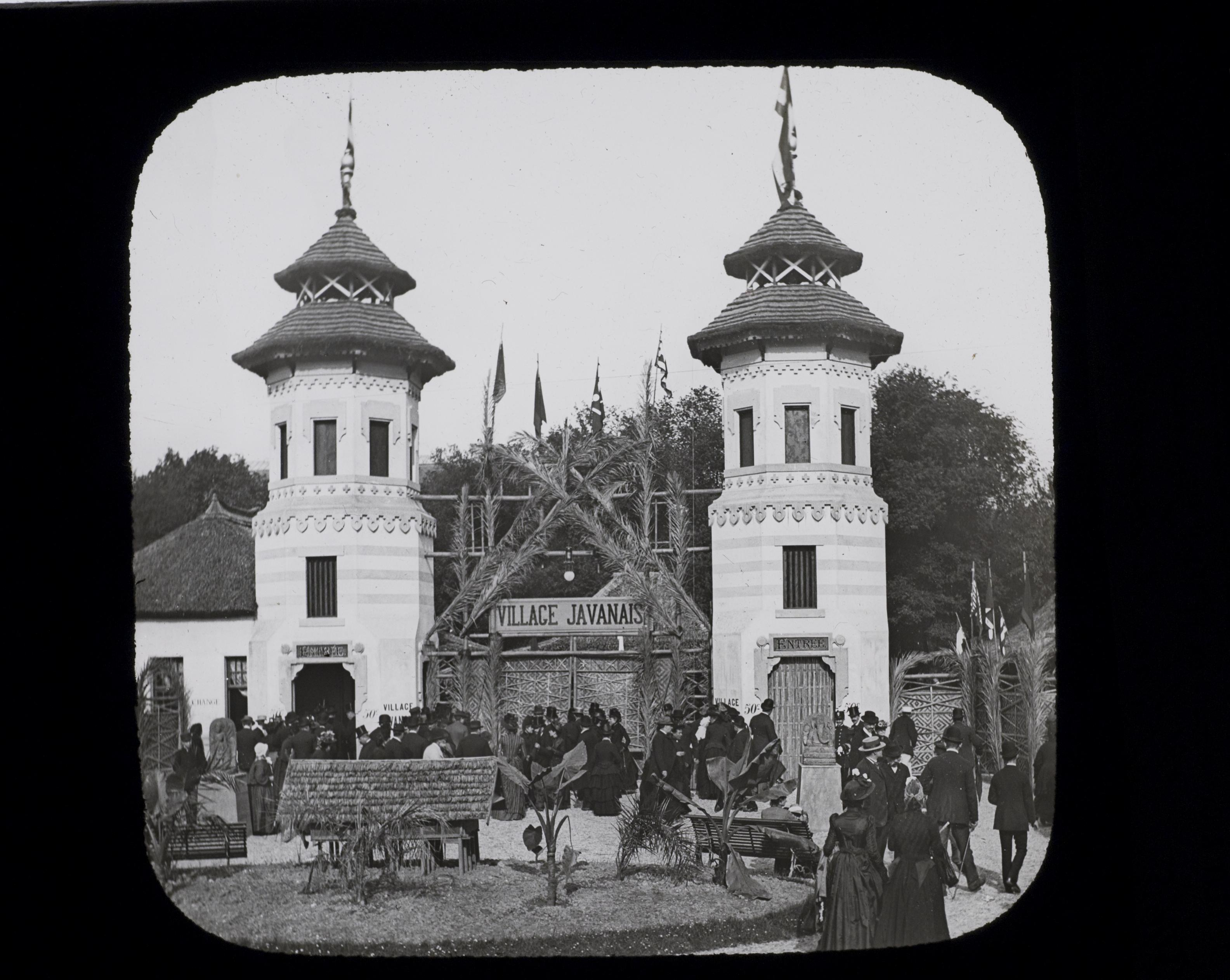
Javanese Village

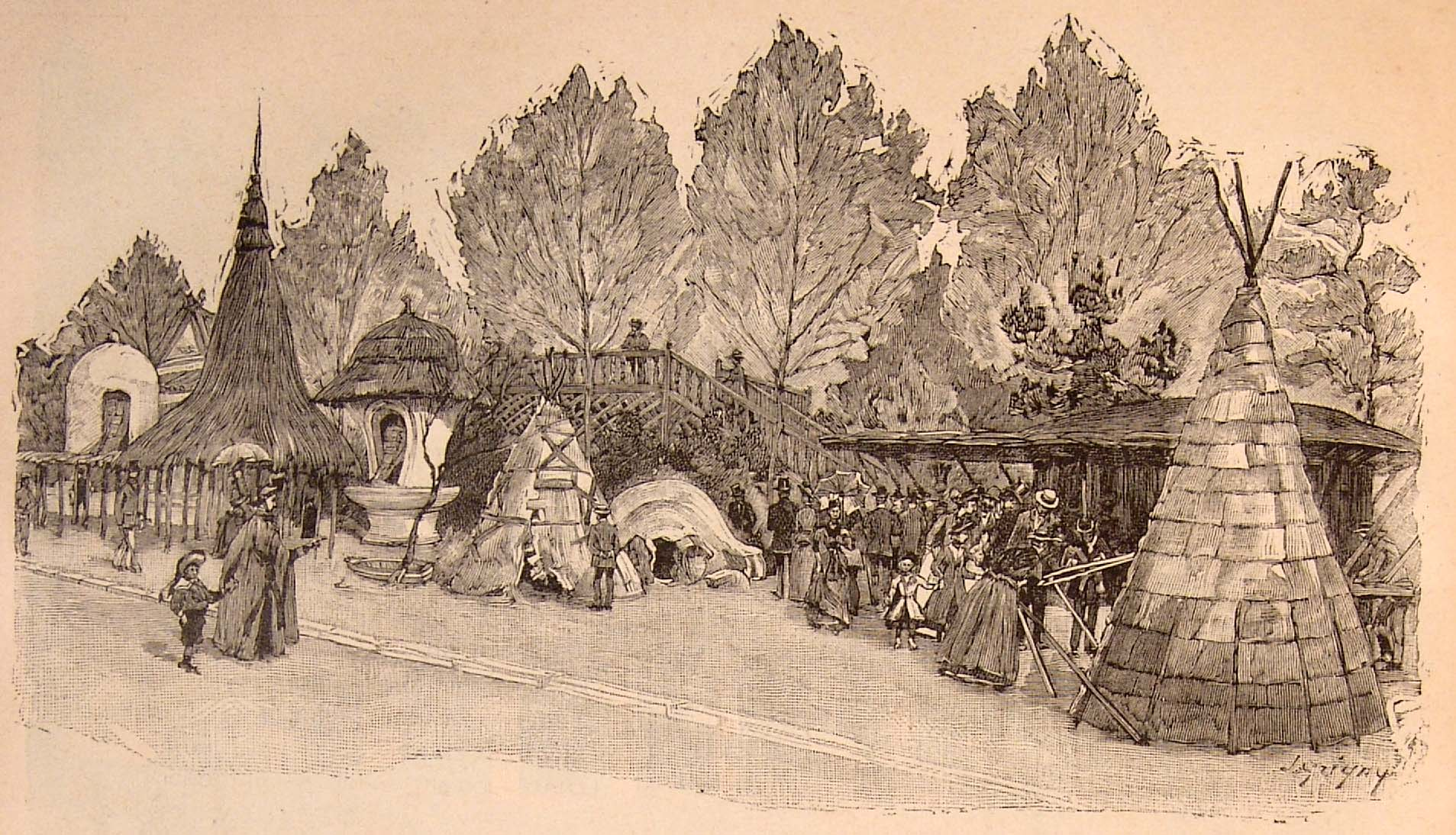
The Finnish Lapland village

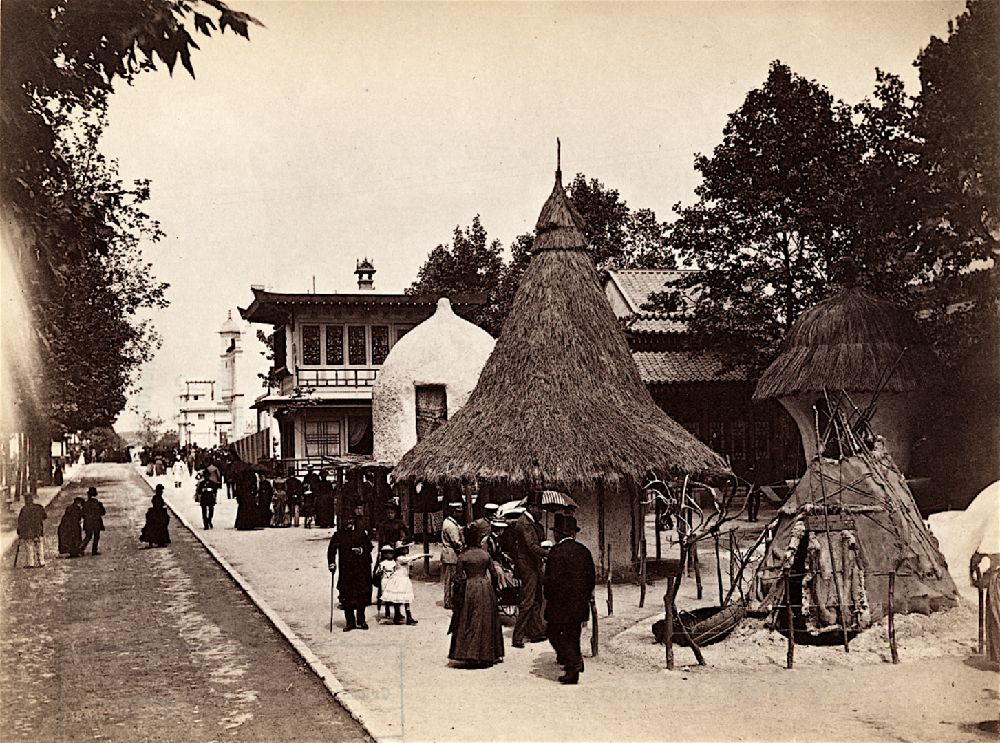
Central African habitation

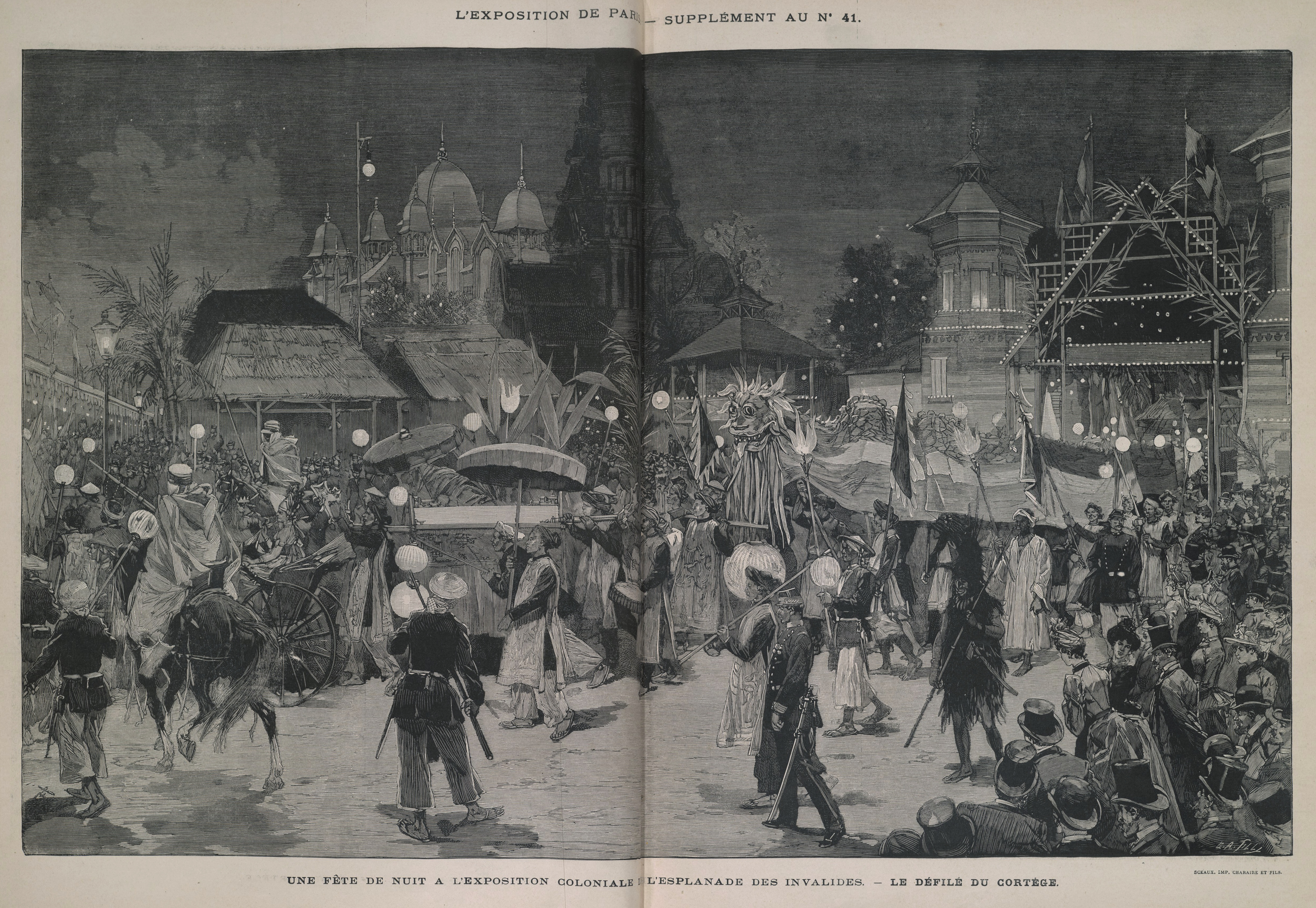
Parade of soldiers, musicians and performers from the French colonies

=== The Pavilions of the participating nations and special industries ===
The Pavilions of the participating nations were located along the edge of the Champ de Mars. The Latin American nations had particularly colorful and lavish structures.

The Pavilion of Argentina was one of the largest and most decorative pavilions in the exposition. It was designed by the French architect Albert Ballu, who won the 1887 design competition. It covered 1,600 square meters, and was fifty meters high, topped by five iron and glass cupolas and surrounded by a frieze of mosaics, ceramics and coloured glass ornaments. After the exposition closed, it was taken apart and shipped to Buenos Aires, where it stood until it was dismantled in 1952.

In addition to the nations, there were pavilions of specialized industries, such as the Suez Canal company, the pavilion of the Transatlantic steamship company, the telephone and electricity pavilions, and the Pavilions of gas and oil. The Palace of Food Products was a very large and ornate structure, presenting French food and wine products. One of its highlights was an enormous sculpted wooden barrel from Champagne Mercier that could hold 200,000 bottles of champagne.

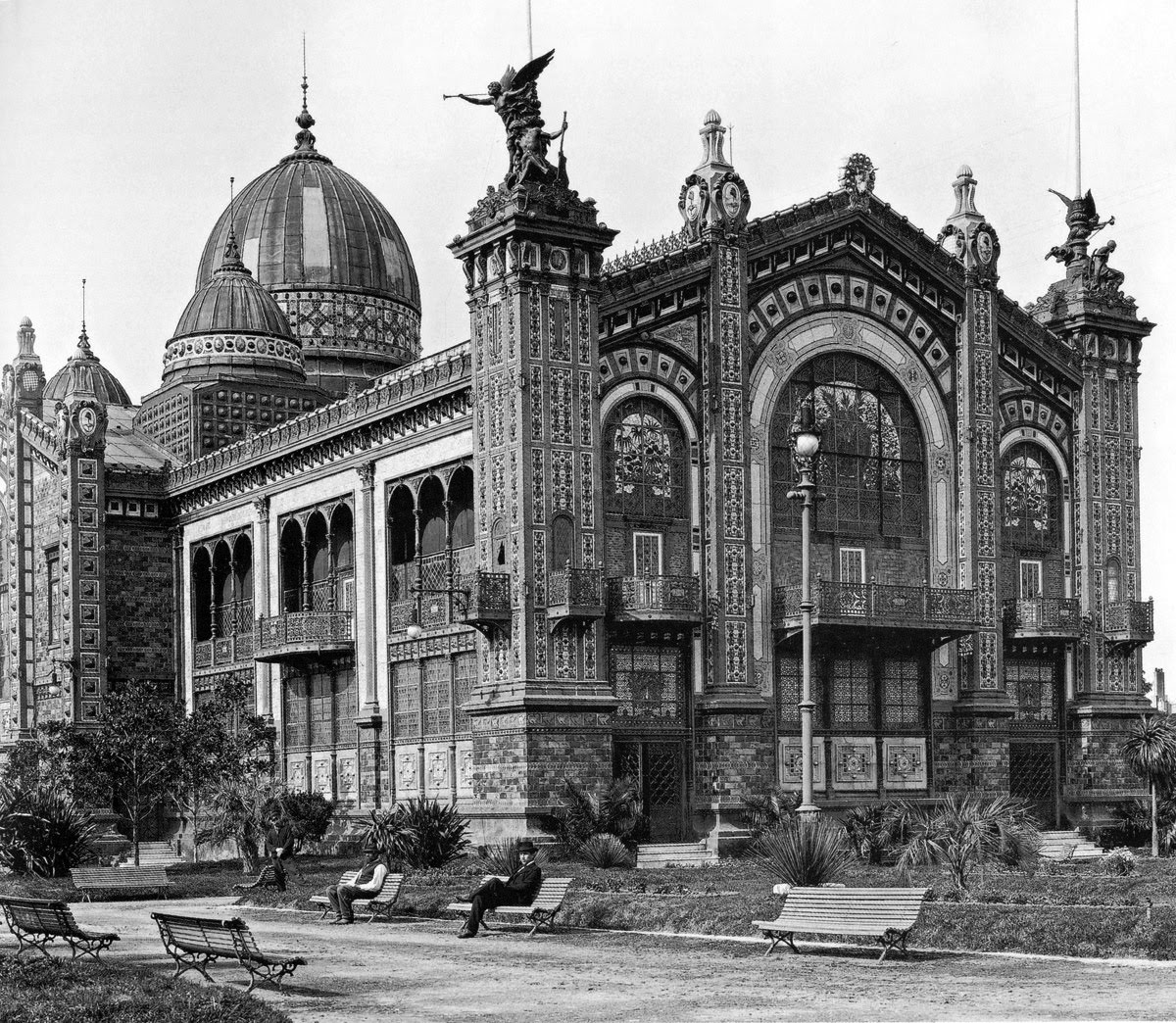
The Pavilion of Argentina, winner of the contest for best national pavilion

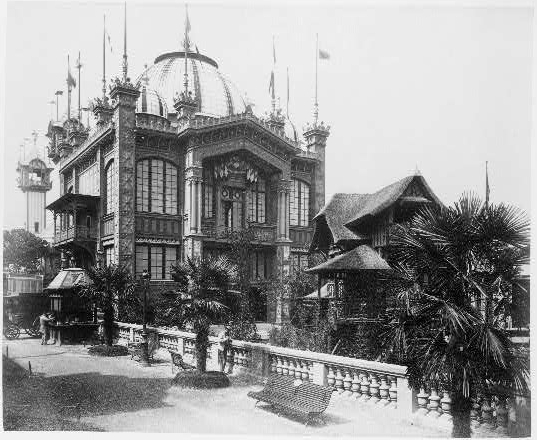
Pavilion of Chile (Current Museo Artequin)

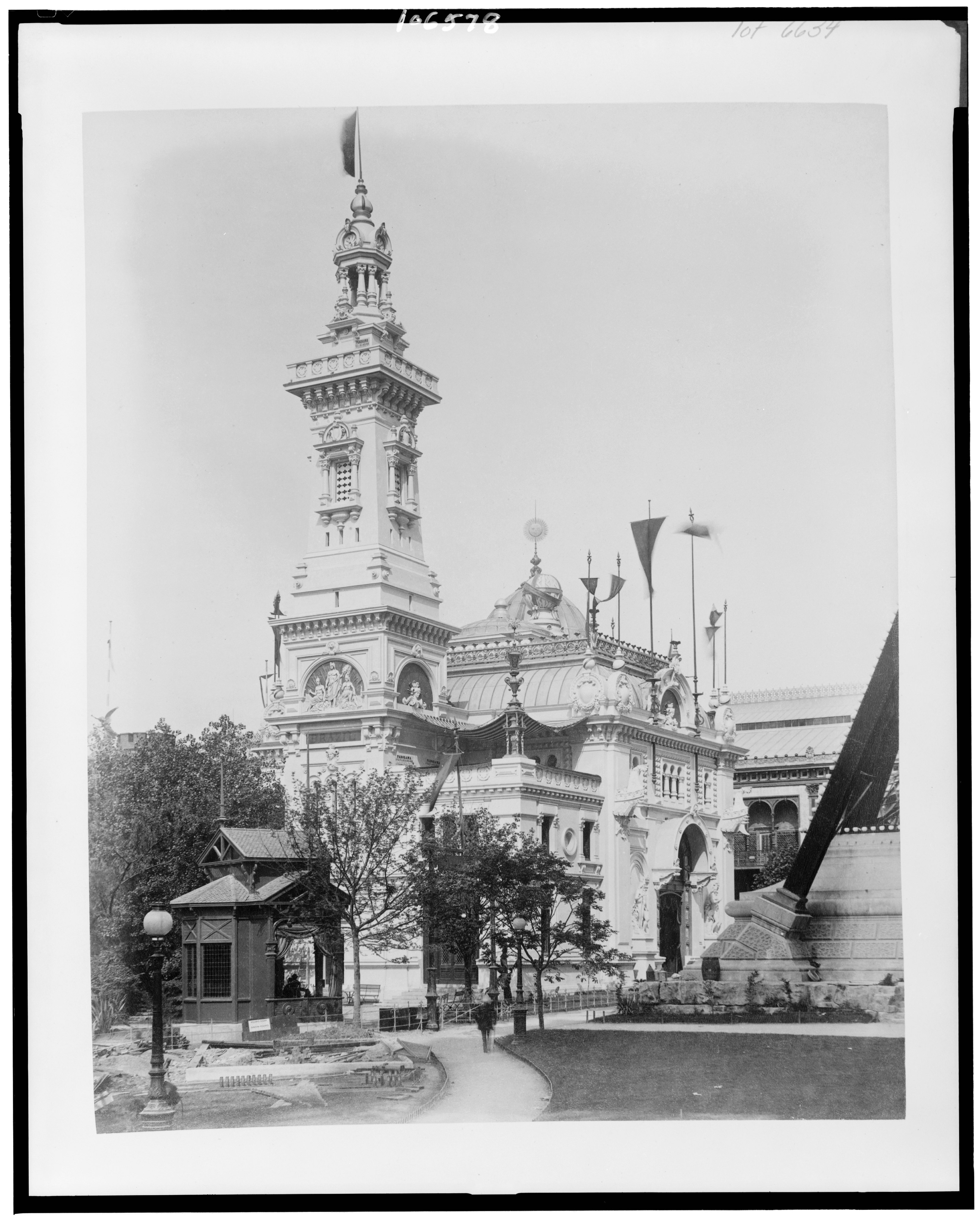
Pavilion of Brazil

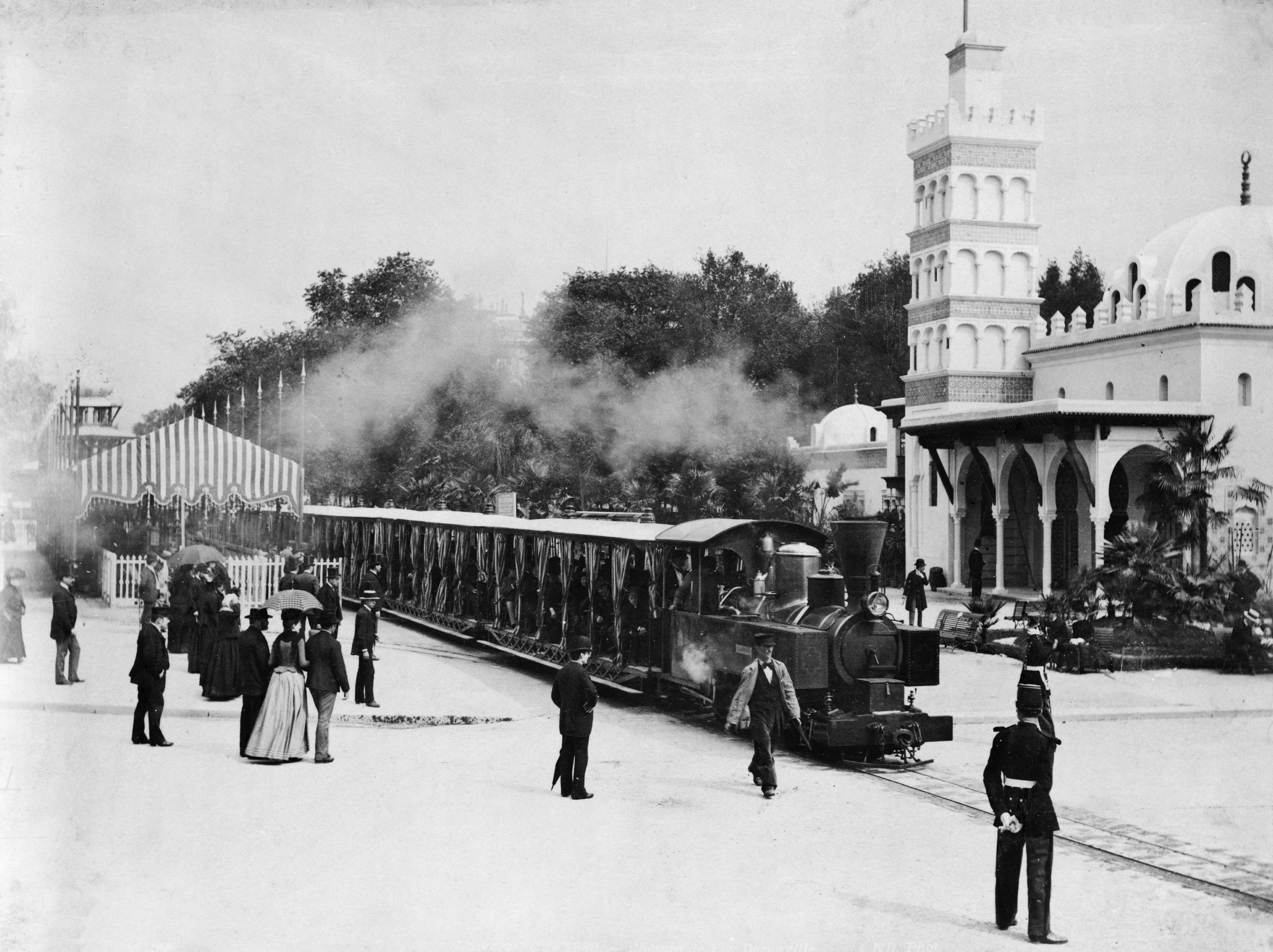
Pavilion of Algeria, with the exposition train

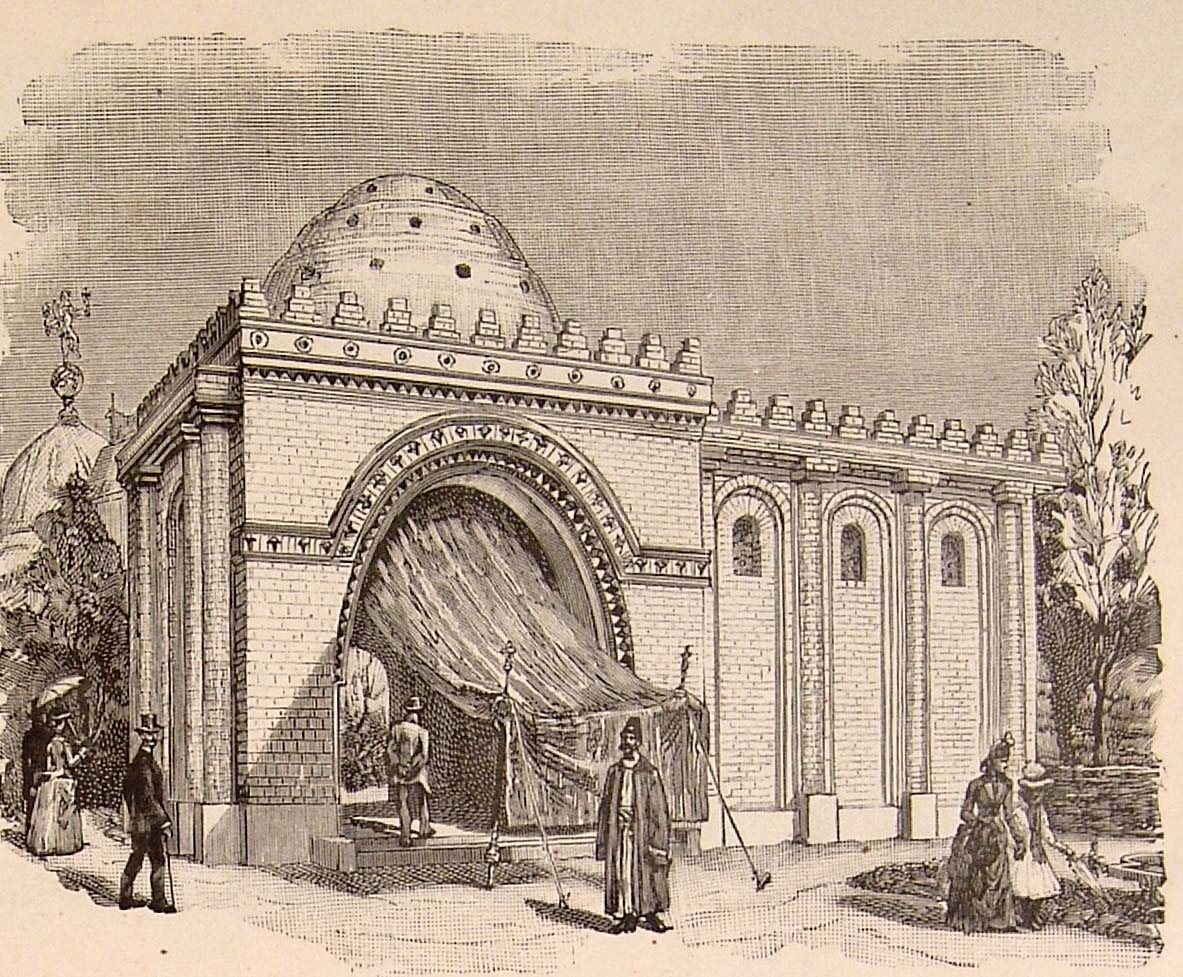
Pavilion of Persia

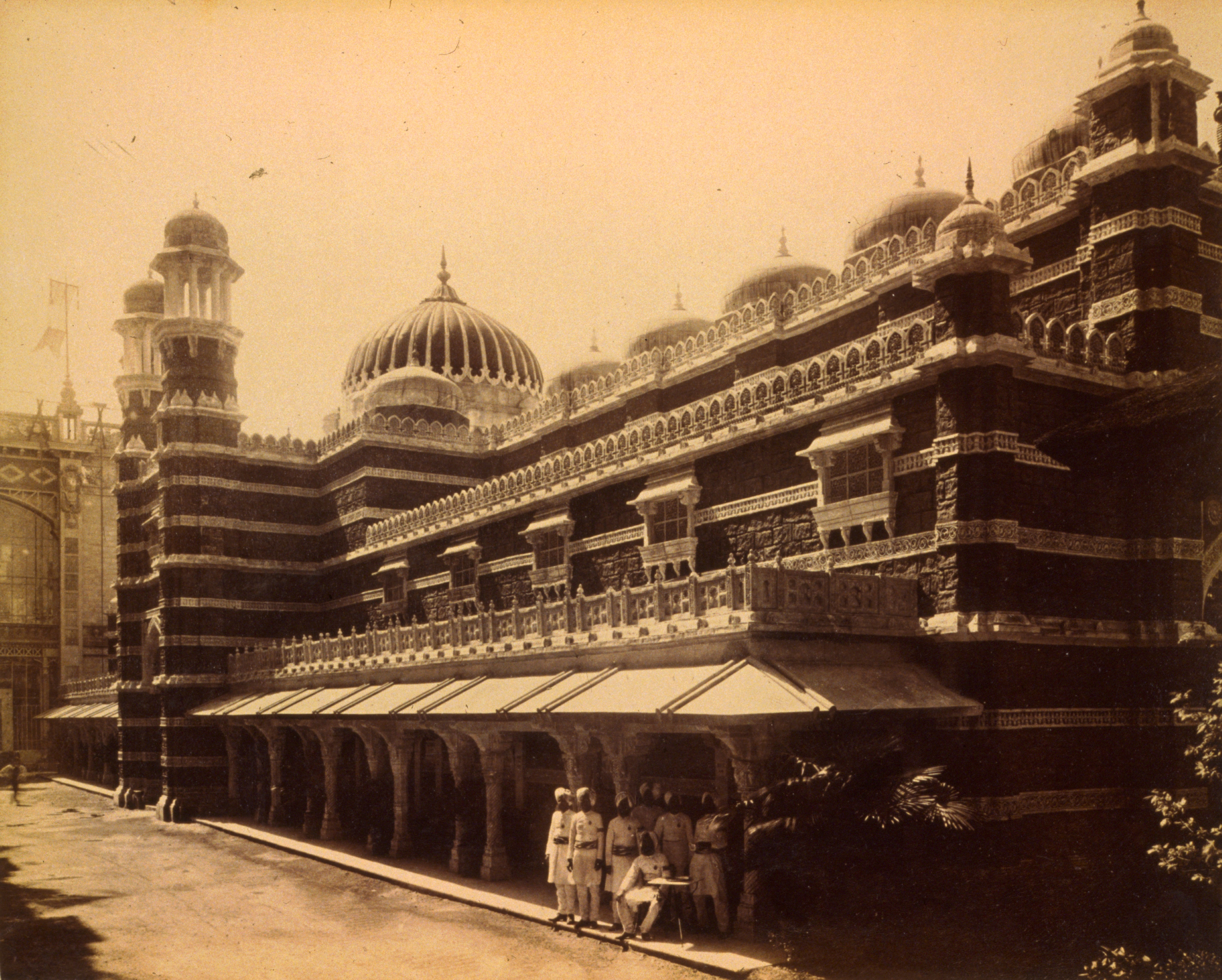
Pavilion of India

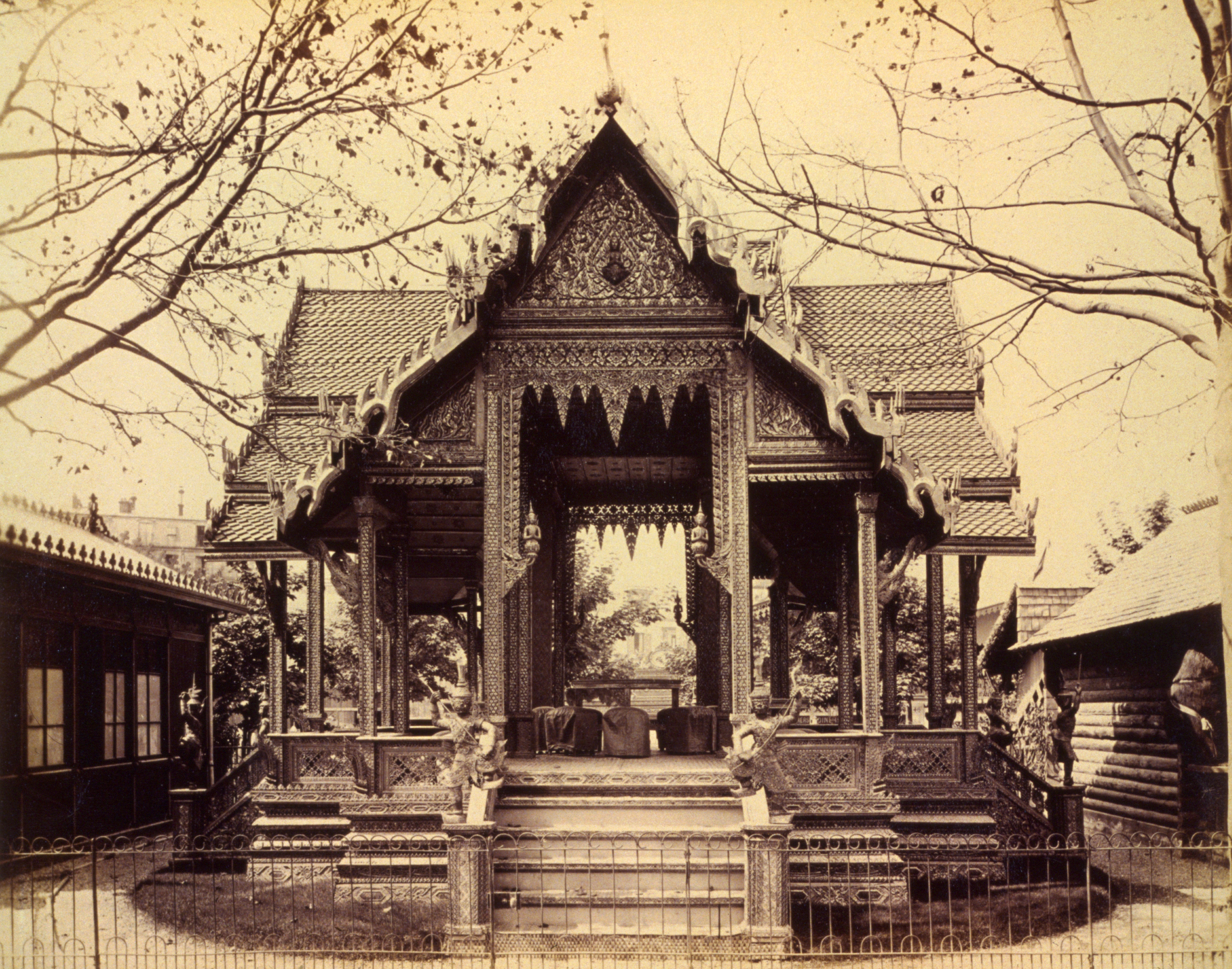
Pavilion of Siam

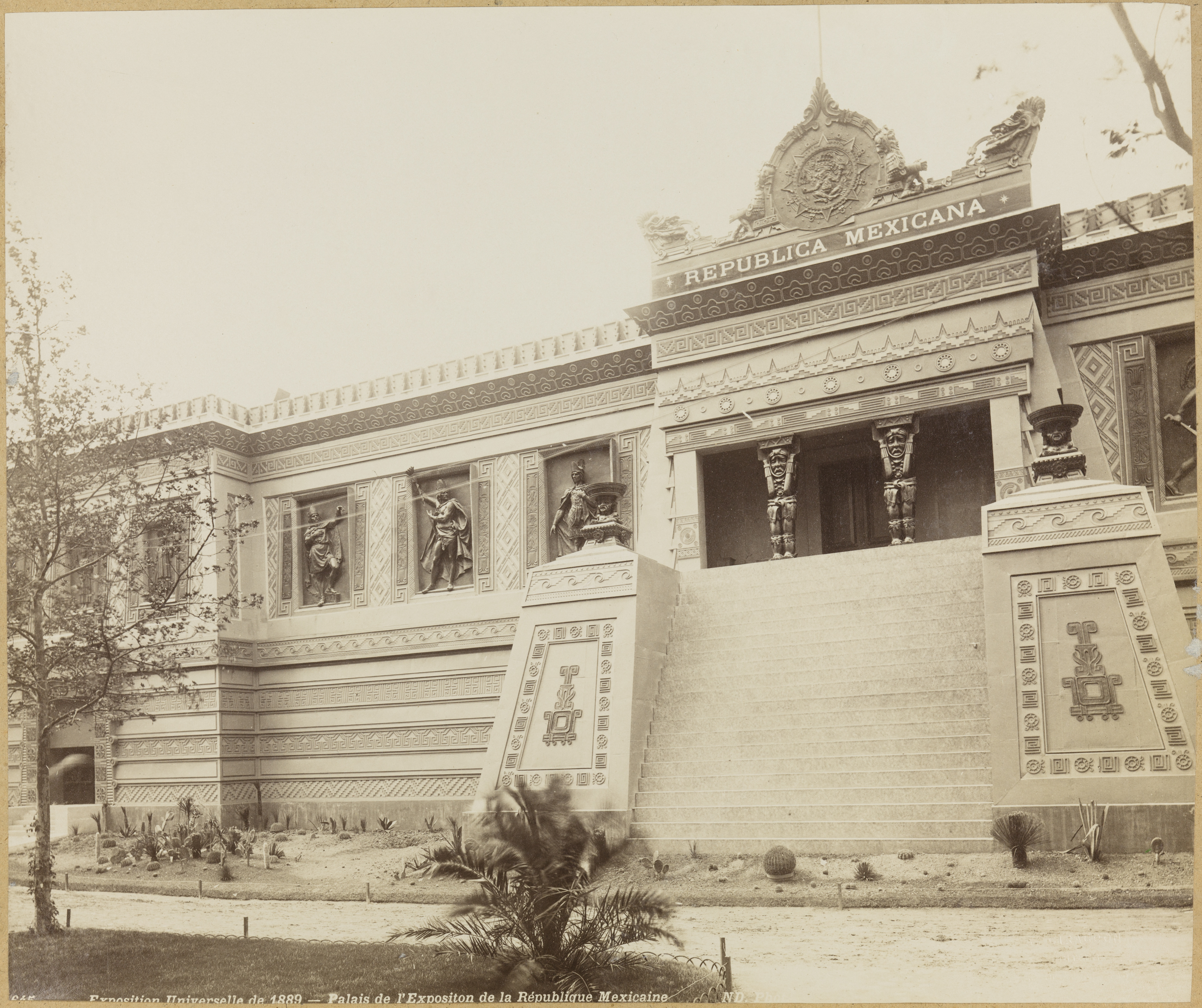
Pavilion of Mexico based on Mesoamerican architecture and including reliefs of Aztec tlatoanis by Jesús Fructuoso Contreras

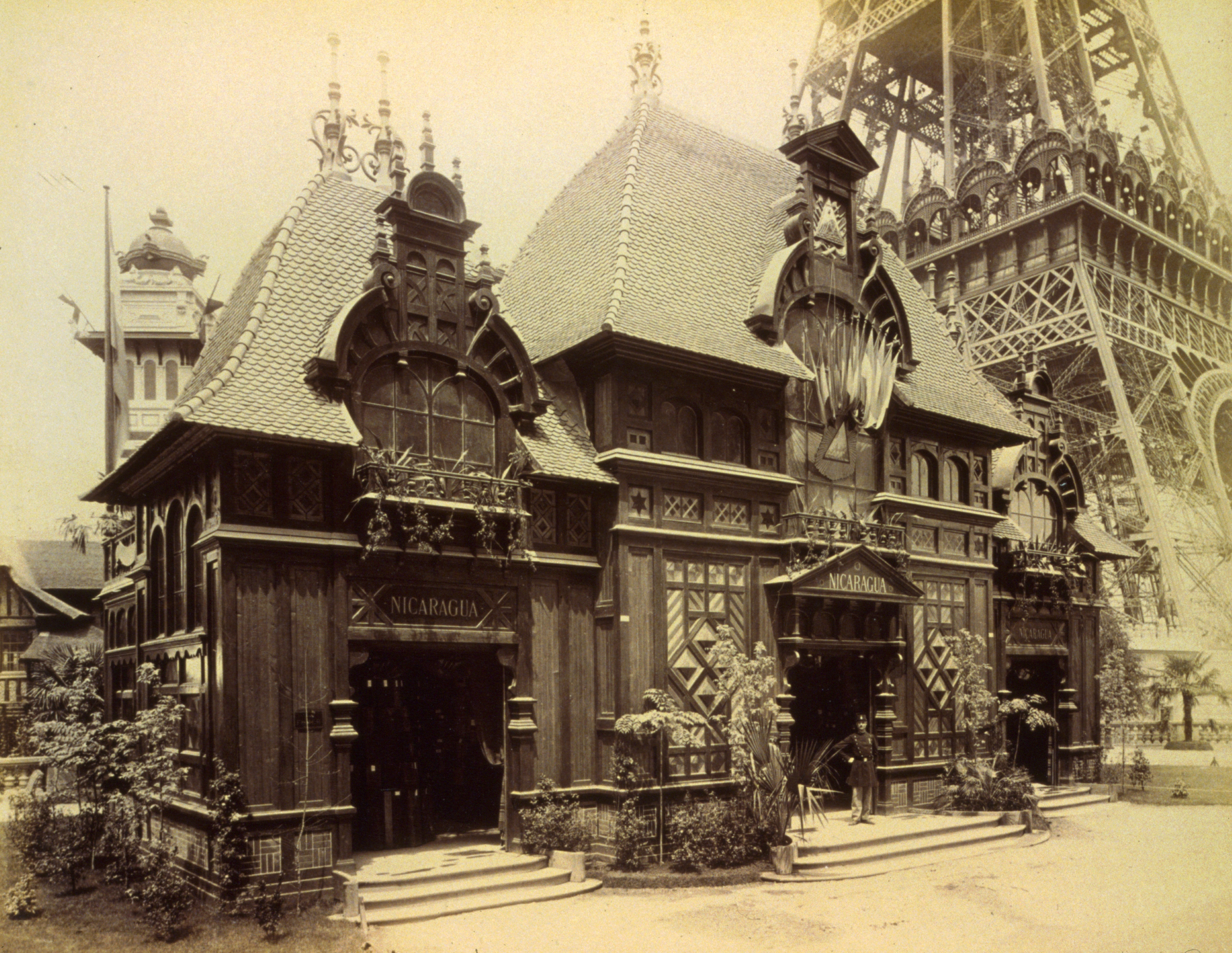
Pavilion of Nicaragua

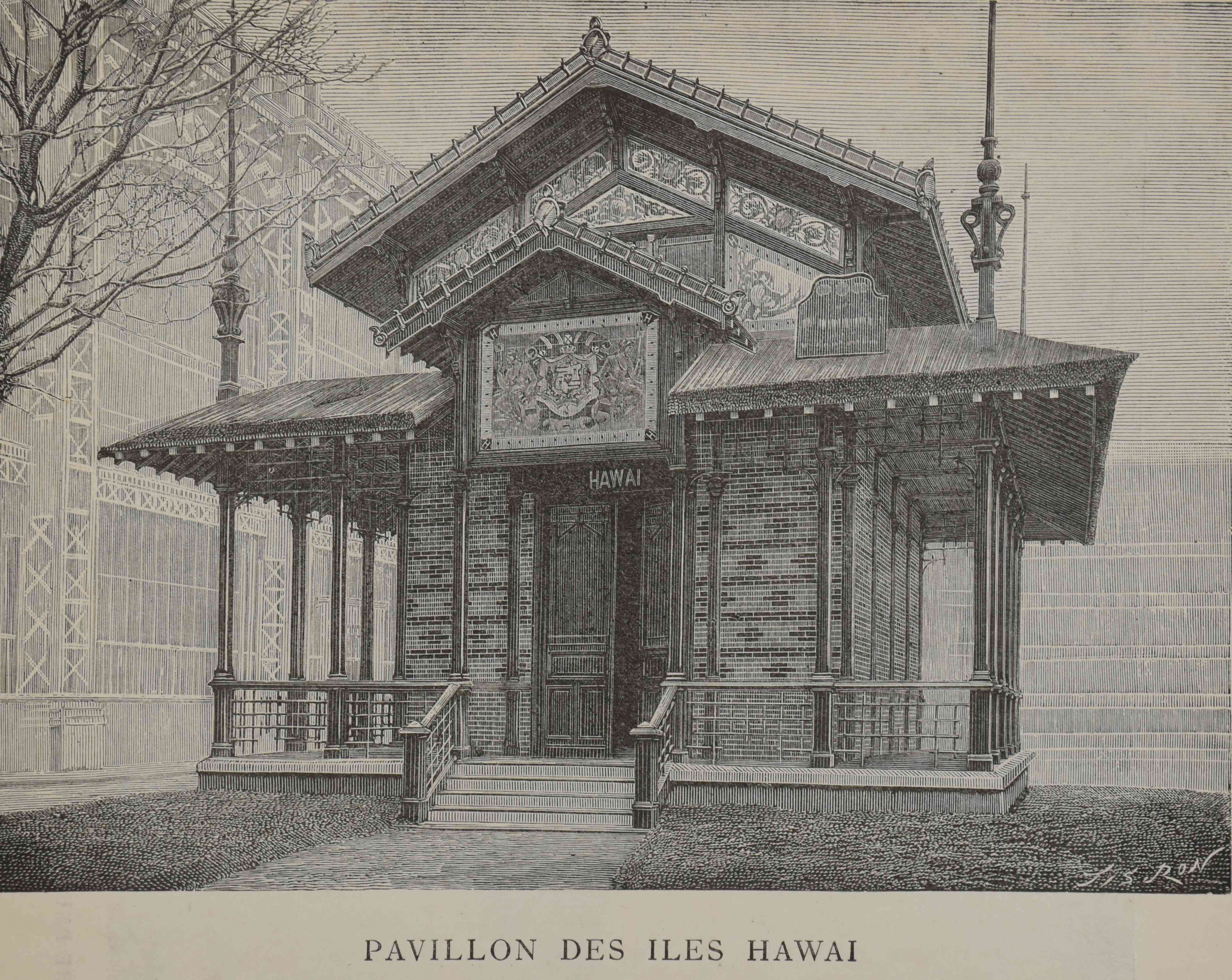
Pavilion of the Hawaiian Islands

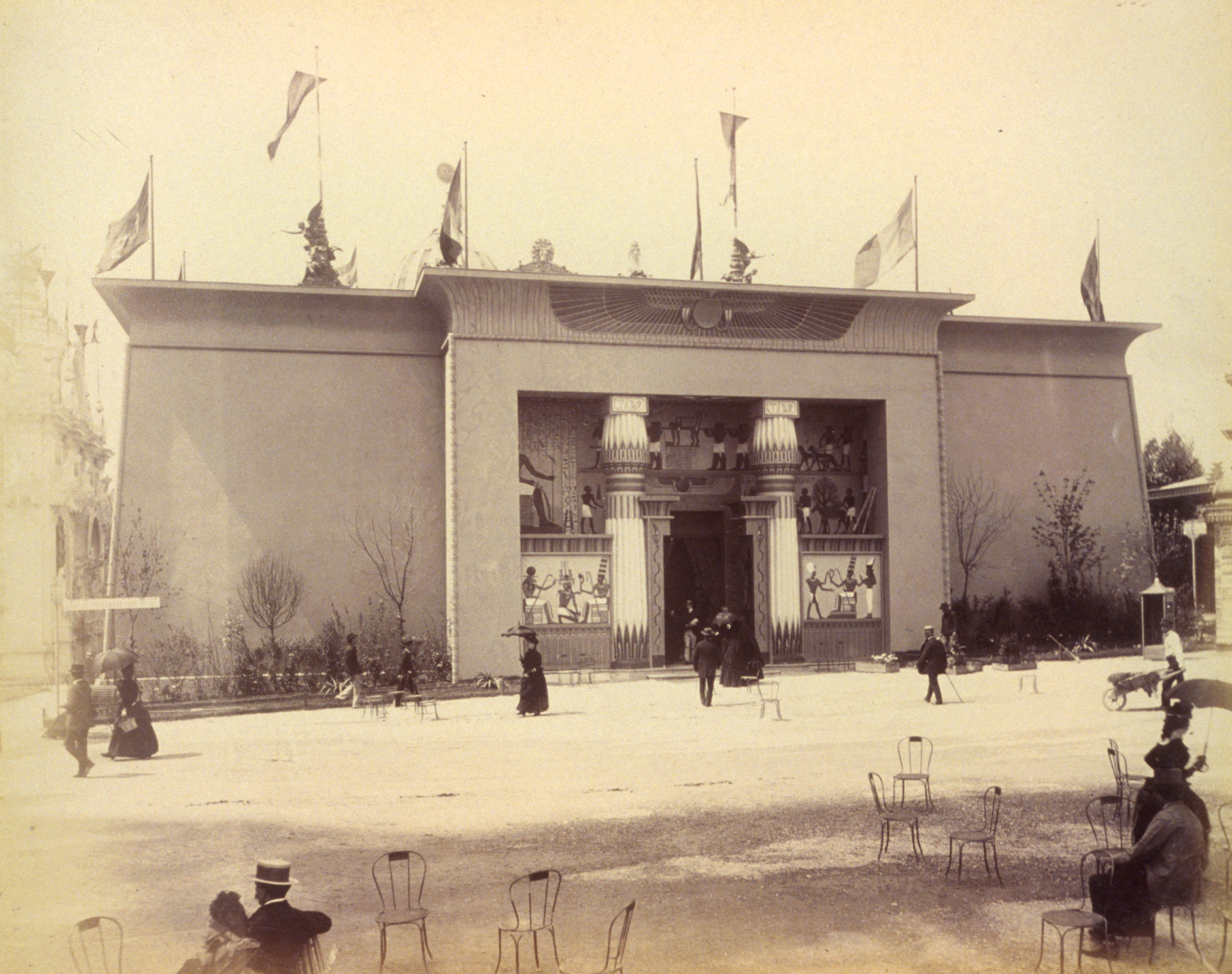
Pavilion of the Suez Canal Company, in Egyptian style

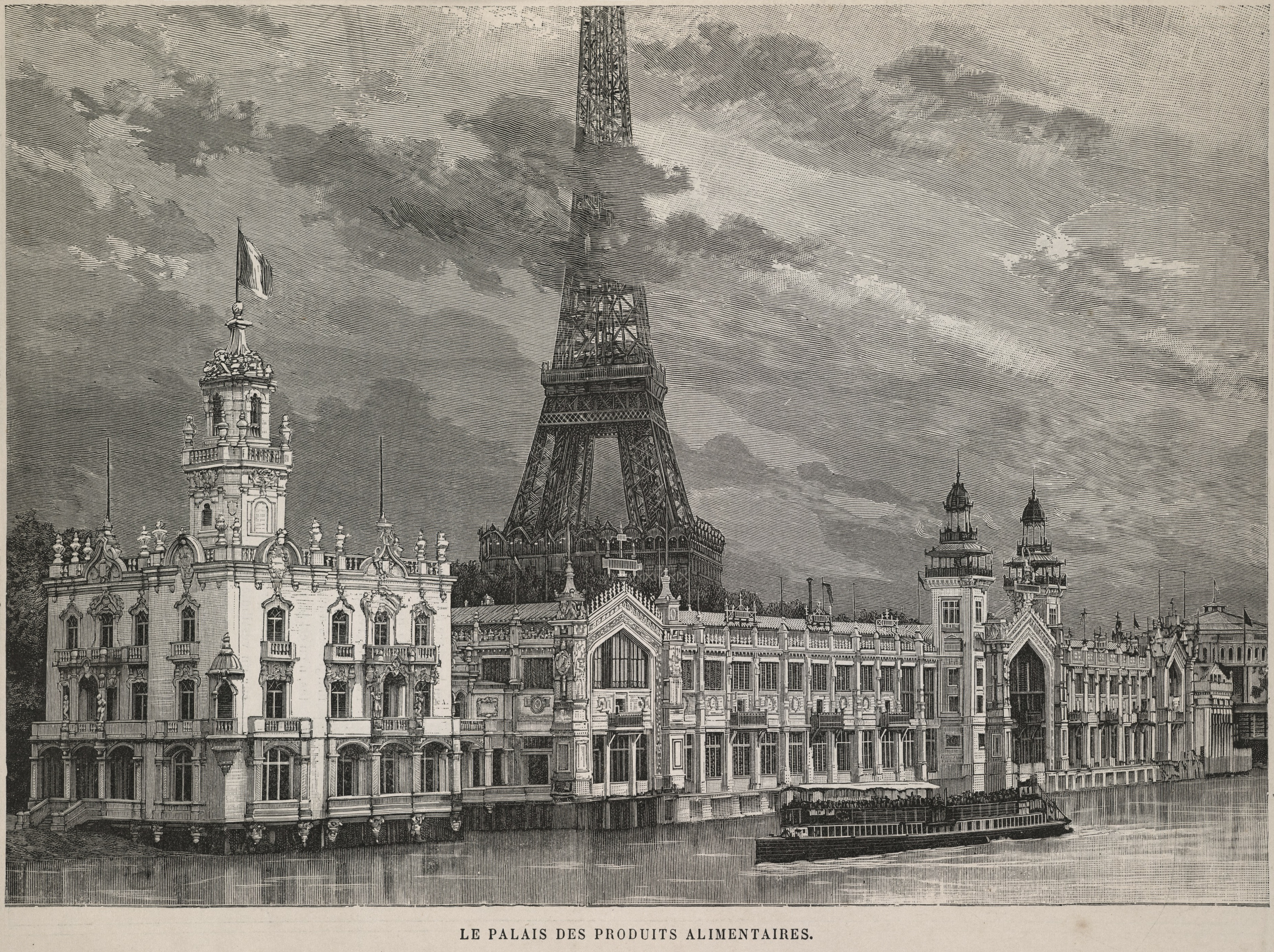
The Palace of Food Products

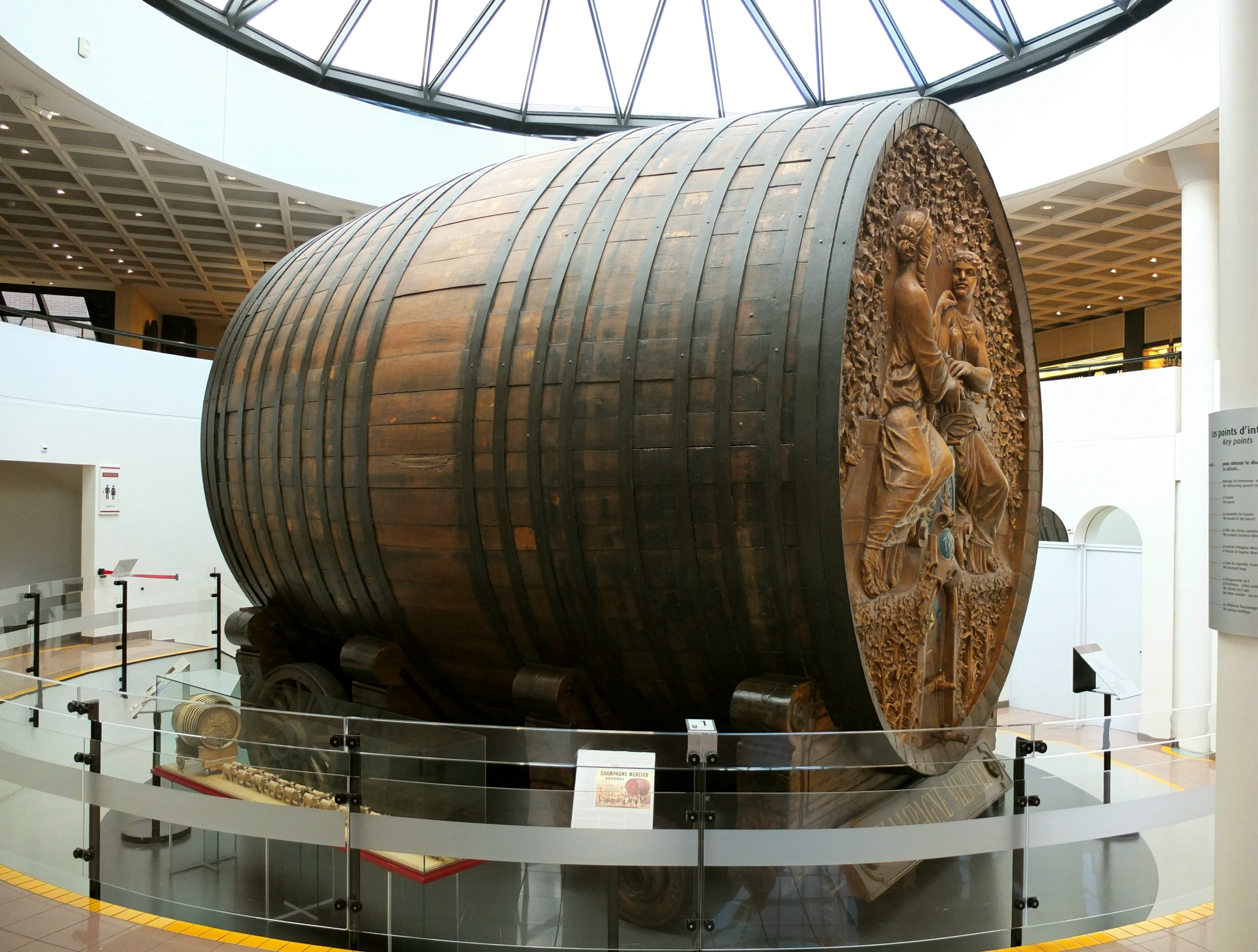
A gigantic oak barrel with a capacity of 200,000 bottles of champagne was a feature of the Champagne Mercier exhibit at the food and wine pavilion.

=== Charles Garnier's History of Habitation ===
An unusual display was the "History of Habitation", designed by Charles Garnier, the architect of the Paris opera house named for him. He was then 61 and had designed very few other major projects since the Opera. Although he had also signed a petition, along with other prominent writers and artists, that denounced the Eiffel Tower as an atrocity, he agreed to design a series of houses to illustrate the history of human habitation. The houses, separated by gardens, were placed close to the Eiffel Tower on a narrow strip of land along Quai D'Orsay and the banks of the Seine.

The houses were arranged by century and by continent, beginning with Garnier's idea of prehistoric dwellings and huts, through the Ancient Egyptians, Greeks, Romans and other early civilizations, through the Middle Ages and Renaissance to the modern then houses from Japan, and China and the homes of the Inuit, and dwellings from Africa, Japan, China and Lapland, and dwellings of Native Americans, Aztecs and Incas. The dwellings were designed by Garnier with more imagination than strict historical accuracy, but they were picturesque and very popular. The Roman House had a special function, as the residence of the President of France when he visited the exposition.

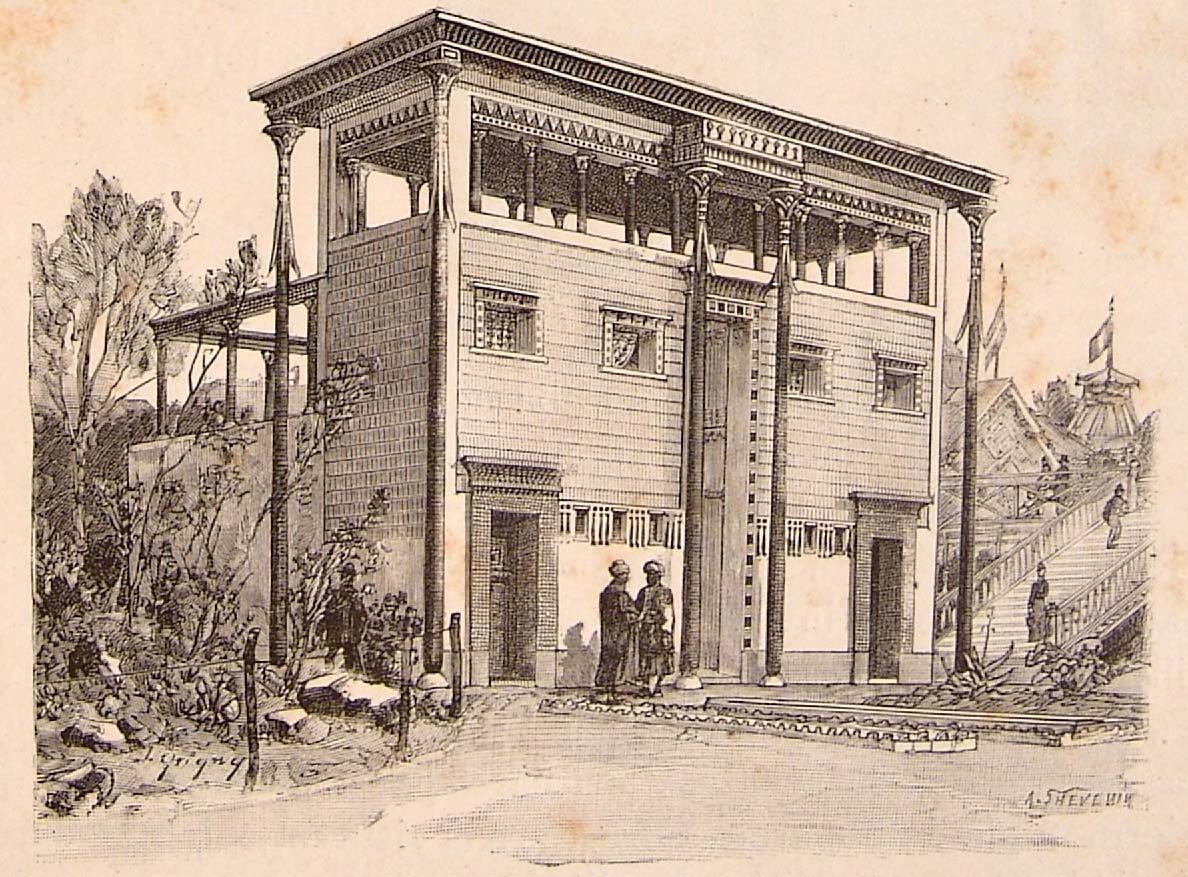
The Egyptian House of the History of Habitation, by Charles Garnier

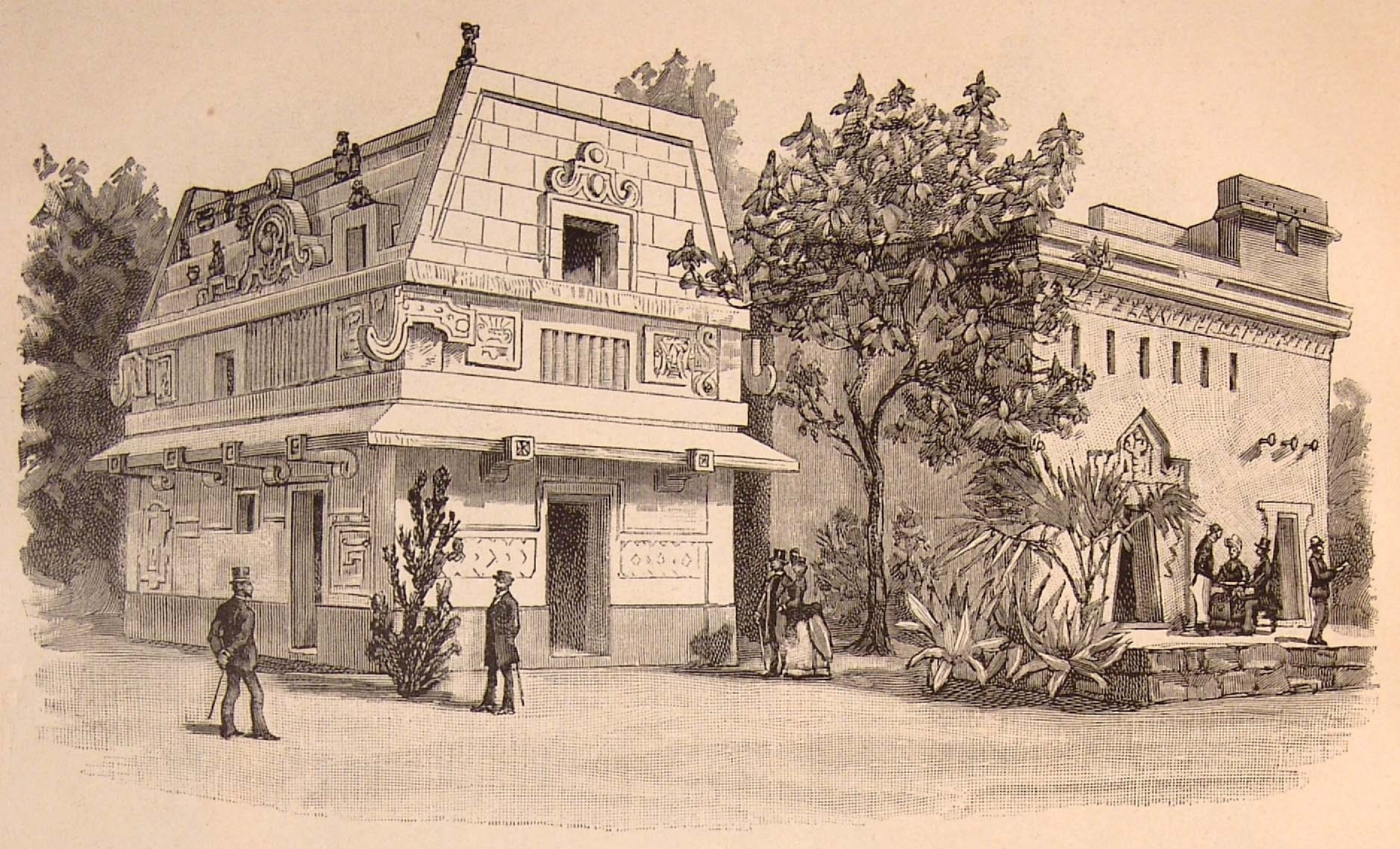
The Aztec House and Incan House by Charles Garnier

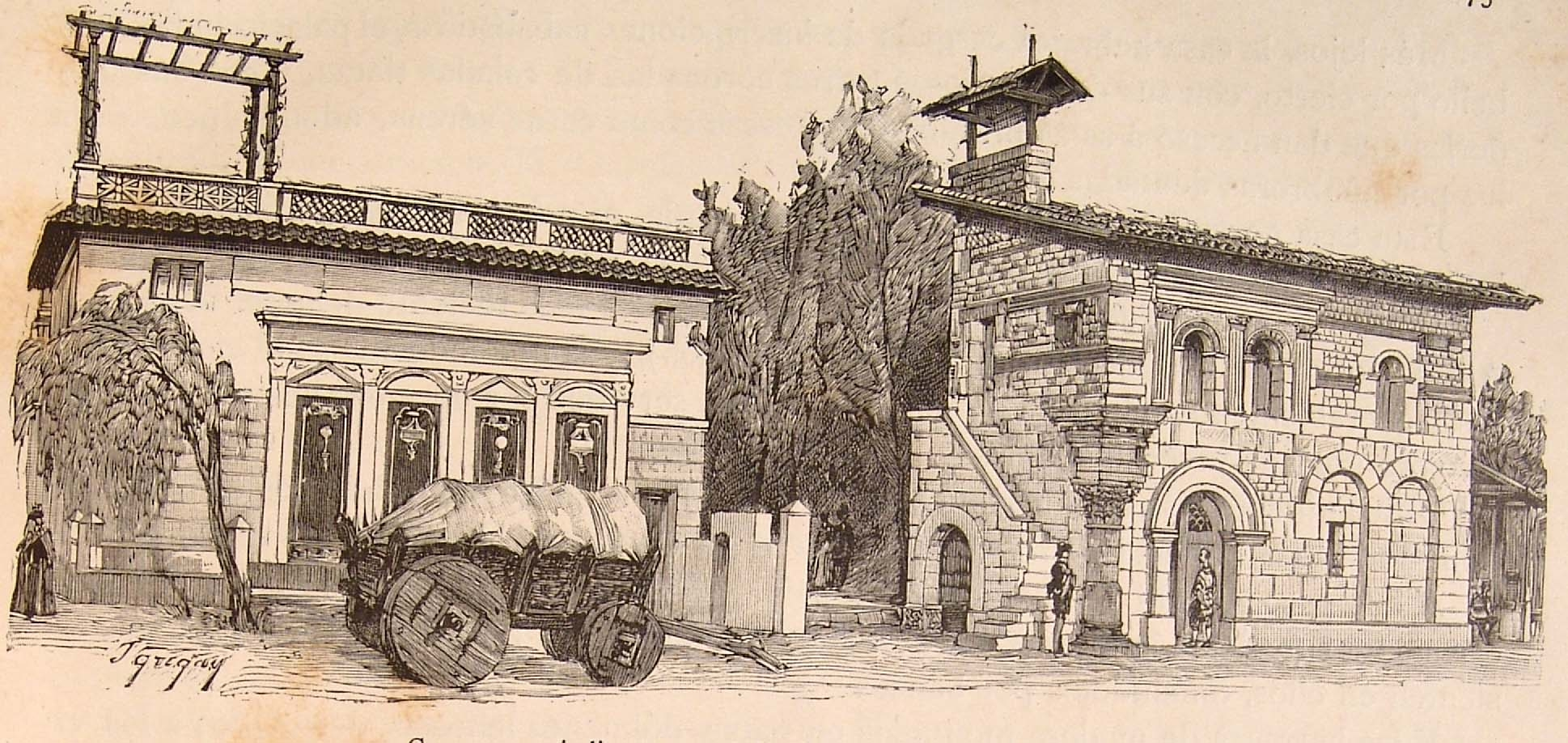
The Roman House and the Gallo-Roman House, by Charles Garnier

=== Other buildings ===
Many smaller but picturesque buildings were included within or adjacent to the exposition. The architect Hector Guimard, then just twenty-two years old, built his first two buildings for the exposition; The cafe-restaurant Au Grand Neptune at 148 Quai Louis-Bleriot (Paris 16th arrondissement), and a small Pavillon of Electricity for an electrician named Ferdinand de Boyéres, located just outside the exposition site at avenue de Suffren. The Pavilion of electricity was demolished immediately after the exposition, and the cafe was torn down in 1910.

The British journal Engineering noted:

The exhibition will be famous for four distinctive features. In the first place, for its buildings, especially the Eiffel tower and the Machinery Hall; in the second place, for its Colonial Exhibition, which for the first time brings vividly to the appreciation of the Frenchmen that they are masters of lands beyond the sea; thirdly, it will be remembered for its great collection of war material, the most absorbing subject now-a-days, unfortunately, to governments if not to individuals; and fourthly, it will be remembered, and with good cause by many, for the extraordinary manner in which South American countries are represented.

== Music and entertainment ==
The exposition itself included several large theatres for concerts and spectacles, including one for the dancers of Les Follies Parisiens. A separate theatre presented the music and dance of the French colonies in Indochina. Operas and concerts were also given in the grand hall of the Trocadero Palace.

- The Opéra Comique premiered on 14 May 1889 with a work specially composed for that event: Jules Massenet's Esclarmonde (debuting American soprano Sybil Sanderson).
- The Barnum and Bailey Circus performed during the exposition in the Salle des Fetes of the Palais des Machines.
- At the exposition, the French composer Claude Debussy first heard Javanese gamelan music, performed by an ensemble from Java. This influenced some of his later compositions.
- Nikolai Rimsky-Korsakov conducted concerts of Russian music by the Mighty Five, introducing them to Paris.

Outside the exposition, other theatres and venues presented a range of spectacles including Buffalo Bill Cody and his Wild West Show, with the sharpshooter Annie Oakley.

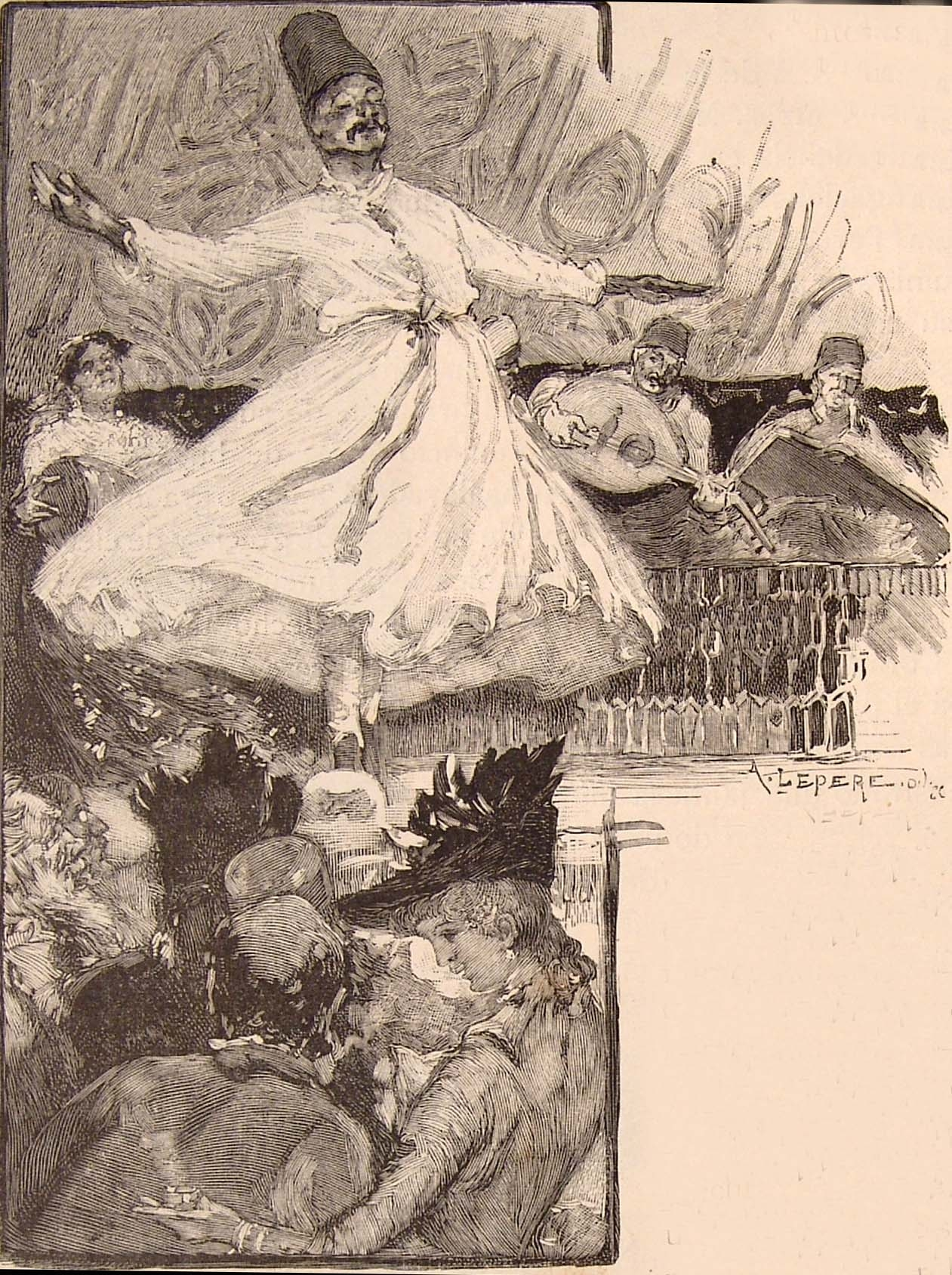
A Dervish dance in an exposition cafe

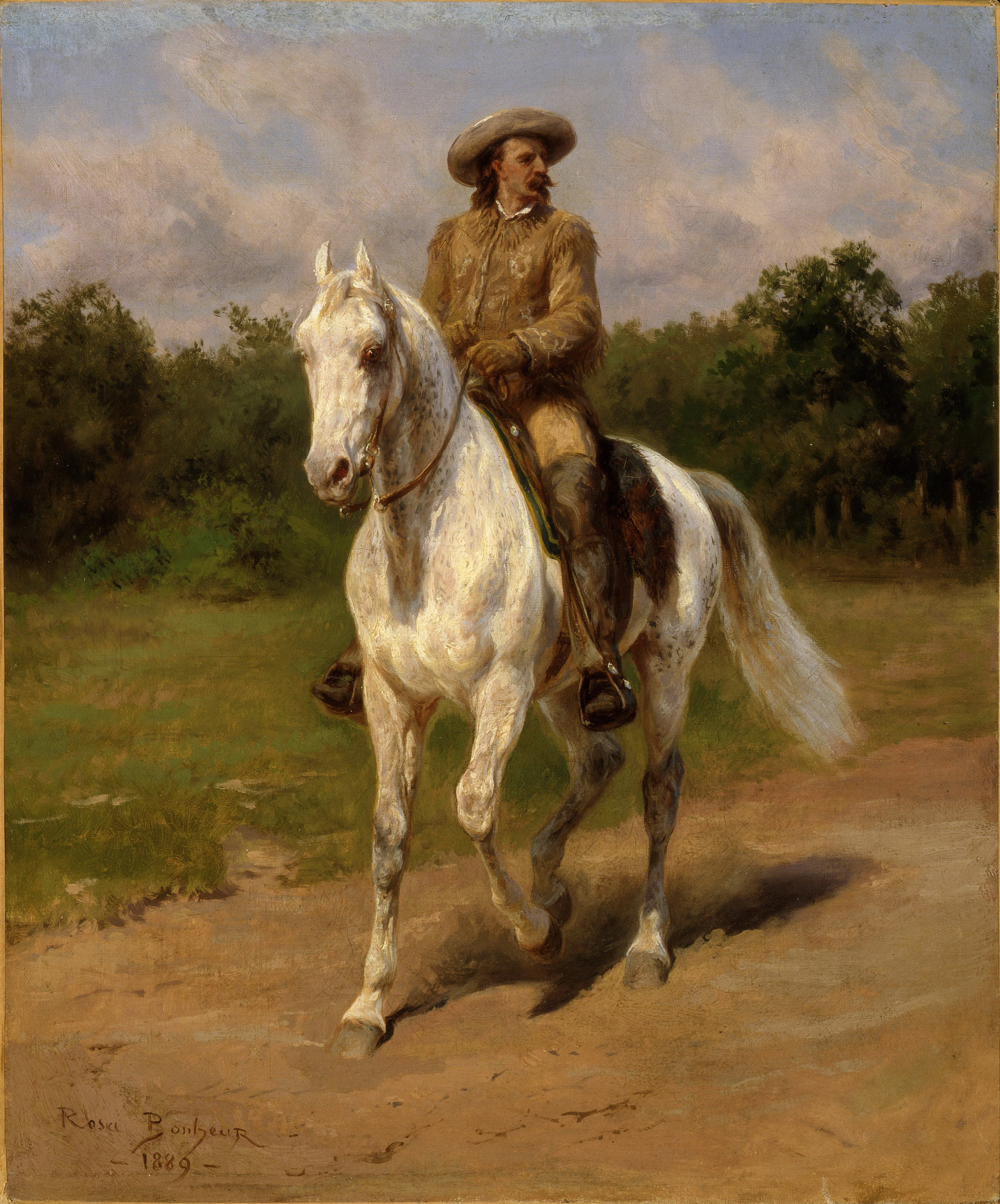
Buffalo Bill Cody, painted in 1889 by Rosa Bonheur

== Transportation – the miniature train ==
Transport around the exposition was partly provided by the 3 kilometre (1.9 mi) 600 mm (1 ft 11 5/8 in) gauge Decauville railway at Exposition Universelle. The exposition railroad was reported to have carried 6,342,446 visitors in just six months of operation. Some of the locomotives used on this line later saw service on the Chemins de fer du Calvados and the Diégo Suarez Decauville railway.

== Notable visitors and special events ==
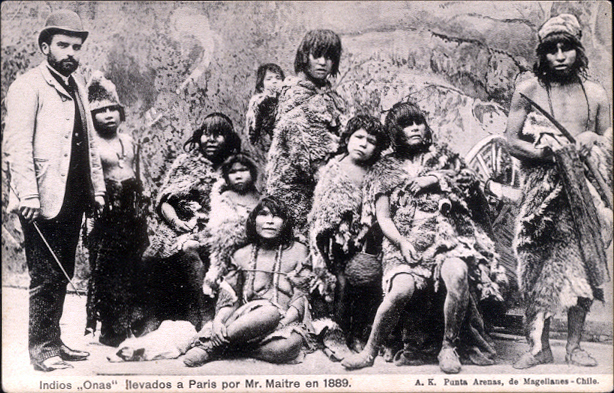
Natives of Tierra del Fuego (Argentine Patagonia), brought to Paris by the Belgian whaling entrepreneur Maurice Maître for the exhibition.

Celebrities and dignitaries from around the world visited the exposition. Thomas Edison, with his wife and daughter, visited the exposition on August 14, 1889, his third day in France, to visit the exhibit where his improved phonograph was being demonstrated. He also ascended to the viewing platform of the Eiffel Tower, where he was met by a group of Sioux Indians who were at the exposition to perform in Buffalo Bill's Wild West Show. He returned to the Eiffel Tower later in his visit (Sept 10), where he was hosted for a lunch in Eiffel's private apartment on the Tower, along with the composer Charles Gounod (despite Gounod's earlier opposition to the Tower.

Other prominent visitors included the Shah of Persia Nasereddin Shah, Prince of Wales (the future Edward VII) and his wife, Princess Alexandra; artists Antoni Gaudi, James McNeill Whistler, Edvard Munch, Rosa Bonheur and Paul Gauguin; U.S. journalist and diplomat Whitelaw Reid; author Henry James; Filipino patriots José Rizal and Marcelo H. del Pilar; and inventor Nikola Tesla.

A central attraction in the French section was the Imperial Diamond, at the time the largest diamond in the world.

The Mexican pavilion featured a model of an exotic Aztec temple, a "combination of archeology, history, architecture, and technology."

The presentation of Joseph Farcot's steam engine, that had already won a prize in 1878.

== Statistics ==
- Expenses: 41,500,000 Francs
- Receipts: 49,500,000 Francs
- Visitors: 32,250,297
- Exhibitors: over 61,722, of whom 55% were French
- Countries represented: 35

== Legacy ==
Most of the buildings were on military land or city-owned park land, and they were demolished shortly after the exposition closed. The most notable survivor was the Eiffel Tower, which had been deliberately built on Paris city-owned land, to avoid demolition.

The Exhibition included a building by the Paris architect Pierre-Henri Picq. This was an elaborate iron and glass structure decorated with ceramic tiles in a Byzantine-Egyptian-Romanesque style. After the exposition, the building was shipped to Fort-de-France in Martinique and reassembled there, the work being completed by 1893. Known as the Schœlcher Library, initially it contained the 10,000 books that Victor Schœlcher had donated to the island. Today, it houses over 250,000 books and an ethnographic museum, and stands as a tribute to the man it is named after who led the movement to abolish slavery in Martinique.

A painting shown at the Exhibition depicting the 1886 Scotland-England rugby union football match drew intrigued Parisian crowds, which sports historians suggest may have helped spark the initial local interest that led to the first domestic French rugby matches in 1890. The work, by British artists William Overend and Lionel Smythe, is now lost.

== See also ==
- Champ de Mars, Paris – Public park in Paris, France
- Colonial exhibition – Type of exhibition held to promote colonial empires
- Exposition Universelle (1878) – World's Fair held in Paris, France in 1878
- Human zoo – Public exhibits of humans
- Concert Tunisien – Popular Oriental-themed entertainment in France, 1860s–1910s

== Bibliography ==
- Ageorges, Sylvain (2006). Sur les traces des expositions universelles : Paris, 1855–1937 : à la recherche des pavillons et des monuments oubliés. Paris: Parigramme. ISBN 978-28409-6444-5.
- Jonnes, Jill, Eiffel's Tower (2013), Penguin Putnam ISBN 978-01431-1729-2.
- Musée d'Orsay (1989). 1889 : la Tour Eiffel et l'Exposition universelle (in French). Paris: Editions de la Réunion des Musées nationaux. ISBN 2-7118-2244-3. (Catalog of a centennial exhibition on the Expositon in 1989).
- Engineering [Journal] 3 May 1889 (vol XLVII), London: Office for Advertisements and Publication, 1866– ISSN 0013-7782.
- Structural iron and steel, 1850–1900, edited by Robert Thorne; Aldershot, Hampshire, Great Britain; Burlington, Vt., US: Ashgate/Variorum, 2000. ISBN 0860787591.
