= English-Speaking Union Scotland =

The English-Speaking Union Scotland (ESU Scotland) is an educational Scottish charity whose purpose, shared with the English-Speaking Union internationally, is to promote international understanding and human achievements through the widening use of the English language throughout the world.

ESU Scotland is based in Edinburgh and retains close links with the ESU's international headquarters at Dartmouth House in Mayfair, London.

The mission statement for ESU Scotland is to:

- Promote global friendship and understanding through English

== Debating and public speaking ==
In many circles the ESU is best known for its major educational activity, the promotion of debate as an educational tool. ESU Scotland runs the ESU Scotland Juniors' tournament, which in the 2008/9 school year received 130 entries from 84 schools.

Former winners include Newcastle Royal Grammar School, Kirkcudbright Academy, Grove Academy and Dollar Academy. Only George Heriot's School and Kirkcudbright Academy have won the Juniors on more than one occasion.

ESU Scotland also administers the Scottish legs of the ESU Schools Mace, the ESU Public Speaking Competition and the John Smith Memorial Mace (named after the former Labour leader and winner of the competition who died in 1994).

ESU Scotland also teaches debate through Outreach Programmes, teacher training and the provision of resources. It was commissioned to write comprehensive learning resources by the Scottish Executive in 2006. These can be found at . In 2008, ESU Scotland was awarded follow-up funding to expand and promote these materials.

In 2009, thanks to charitable trust funding the ESU Scotland can work with over 40 schools from across Scotland by giving away free workshops.

As well as this ESU Scotland offers coaching support to branches and ESUs all over the world and is closely involved with the Scotland Schools Debating Team which competes in the World Schools Debating Championships each year. In 2007, the Scotland team won the World Schools Debating Championships.

== Creative writing competition ==
ESU Scotland runs a creative writing competition in conjunction with the National Galleries of Scotland and the Scottish Poetry Library. It is sponsored by the Scottish Qualifications Authority and supported by The Scotsman newspaper.

This competition requires entrants to write a poem or piece of prose inspired by one of the works in the collections of the National Galleries of Scotland. In 2007, the best entrants from the previous two years will be collated into a book.

== EFL classes ==
ESU Scotland offers part-time English language classes for students at all levels, from beginners to advanced. It holds most classes at the ESU in the centre of Edinburgh or at its Learning Centre in Meadowbank.

== World Members Conference 2008 ==
Every four years, the ESU holds a World Members Conference, and in 2008 the World Members Conference was hosted by ESU Scotland in Edinburgh. Speakers at the Conference included Lord Robertson, Professor David Crystal, Sir Richard Dearlove, Professor Bob Worcester, Sir John Bond, Professor Stanley Wells and Sir Christopher Meyer.

== Scholarships ==
Each year, ESU Scotland runs a number of scholarships:

- The Thyne Scholarship - for young Scots to travel to a country or countries of their choice to study and research their own particular vocation.
- The Page Scholarship - for education professionals. Scholars trave to the US to study a specific aspect of American education.
- The Lady Duke Scholarship - for young professionals wishing to study their vocation in the USA.

== Honorary presidents and vice presidents ==
The current honorary president of ESU Scotland is the presiding officer of the Scottish Parliament, Alex Fergusson. The current vice presidents are Jamie McGrigor MSP, Robin Harper MSP, Mike Pringle MSP, Marlyn Glen MSP and Michael Matheson MSP.

== Branches ==
ESU Scotland has one active branch, the Edinburgh branch. The branch holds various events throughout the year including regular lunches and an annual speech forum.

In early 2009, a steering committee for a Glasgow Branch was started up and an official launch will take place later in 2009.

== Other areas of work ==
ESU Scotland also runs The Call Service, an annual service at the Call Statue in Princes Street Gardens which was erected by Americans of Scottish descent to commemorate Scots who gave their lives during World War I.

ESU Scotland also runs public speaking and speech writing courses for adults and voluntary organisations.
