= Edward Stourton (journalist) =

British broadcaster and journalist (1957–2026)

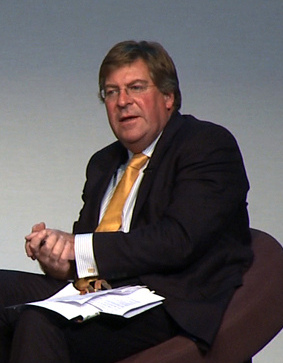
- Stourton in 2010
- Born: Edward John Ivo Stourton; 24 November 1957; Lagos, Federation of Nigeria
- Died: 18 July 2026 (aged 68)
- Education: Trinity College, Cambridge
- Occupations: Broadcaster, journalist, presenter
- Years active: 1979–2026
- Employer(s): ITN; BBC
- Spouses: Margaret McEwen (m. 1980; div. 2001) Fiona Murch (m. 2002)
- Children: 3 including Ivo and Tom

Edward John Ivo Stourton (24 November 1957 – 18 July 2026) was a British broadcaster and journalist. He presented the BBC Radio 4 current affairs programmes Today, Sunday, The World at One and The World This Weekend. Earlier in his career, he worked in television as a founding staff member of Channel 4 News, a BBC Paris correspondent and a BBC One O'Clock News presenter.

Stourton made numerous current affairs programmes for Radio 4, winning the Sony Radio Gold Award in 1997 and the Amnesty International Award in 2001. He was the author of eight books, including Confessions (2023).

== Early life and education ==
Edward John Ivo Stourton was born on 24 November 1957 in Lagos, Nigeria, the eldest of four children of Jenny (née Abbott), a former governess, and Nigel Stourton, a senior British American Tobacco executive and cousin of the 22nd Baron Stourton. His father's work took the family to Africa, Switzerland and Malta. He was privately educated at the Roman Catholic preparatory school Avisford in Walberton, and then at Ampleforth College in North Yorkshire, where he was head boy.

While at Ampleforth, Stourton befriended future High Court judge Nicholas Mostyn, who was also the son of a Nigerian-based BAT executive. They won the national ESU Schools Mace debating prize in 1975. Stourton read English literature at Trinity College, Cambridge, gaining a 2:1. He served as president of the Cambridge Union Society and editor of the student magazine Rampage.

== Broadcasting ==
Stourton joined the staff of ITN in 1979 as a graduate trainee. While working there, he was a founder member of Channel 4 News in 1982, working predominantly as a copywriter but also as a producer, duty home news editor, and chief sub-editor. Stourton joined the BBC in 1988 as a Paris correspondent. He returned to ITN as a diplomatic editor in 1990. In 1993, he was back at the BBC as the presenter of BBC One O'Clock News. He presented editions of Assignment, Correspondent, Panorama, and Call Ed Stourton, a phone-in programme on Radio 4.

Stourton made a number of current affairs programmes for Radio 4 including Asia Gold and Global Shakeout, The Violence Files, With us or against us, United Nations – or Not?. Asia Gold was the winner of the Sony Radio Gold Award for current affairs in 1997. Stourton presented a four-part series about the Catholic church, entitled Absolute Truth, which was broadcast on BBC2 in 1997. He also wrote a book to accompany the series.

In 2001, Stourton won the Amnesty International award for best television documentary for an episode of Correspondent about the Khiam detention center during the Israeli occupation of Southern Lebanon. His series A Year in the Arab Israeli Crisis was broadcast on BBC Radio 4 and the BBC World Service in 2005.

=== Today ===
In January 1999, Stourton joined the BBC's Today programme presentation team. It was announced on 12 December 2008 that he would leave the programme in September 2009, to be replaced by Justin Webb. This announcement was greeted with widespread public dismay, not least because Stourton found out about it from a journalist rather than his employers. Following a campaign by listeners, it was announced on 27 December 2008 that he was not being sacked. Instead, shortly after Webb joined the Today Programme in August 2009, Stourton moved from presenting duties to reporting on foreign stories. Stourton presented Today for the last time on 11 September 2009. After leaving his presentation role on the Today programme, Stourton joined the presenting teams of The World at One and The World This Weekend.

On 27 December 2006, Stourton appeared on the celebrity charitable edition of BBC One's Mastermind, chaired by his BBC Radio 4 Today co-presenter John Humphrys. When asked his name, Stourton replied: "John, why do you need to ask that? We almost sleep together!" His specialist subject was Pope John Paul II, and he later wrote a biography about him.

=== Religious programmes ===
Stourton regularly presented Sunday, Radio 4's religious and ethical current affairs programme.

== Personal life and death ==
Stourton was a descendant of the 19th Baron Stourton and was a Roman Catholic. He was a member of the SDP.

Stourton married Margaret McEwen in 1980, the daughter of the Baronet of Marchmont and Bardrochat. The couple had a daughter (Eleanor) and two sons (Ivo and Tom), before divorcing in 2001. In 2002, he married former colleague Fiona Murch and had a stepdaughter (Rosy) from the marriage.

In 2014, Stourton was diagnosed with prostate cancer, which, by 2023, had become incurable due to metastasis. He said in a 2023 interview with The Daily Telegraph that he was unlikely to live to the age of 80. Stourton died on 18 July 2026, aged 68.

=== Tributes ===
Following his death, colleagues paid tribute to Stourton. Jonathan Munro said it was "far too soon to lose Ed" and that he "leaves a huge gap", while Mohit Bakaya called him "an outstanding broadcaster" who helped listeners "understand the world that little bit better".

== Publications ==
- John Paul II: Man of History (Hodder & Stoughton), ISBN 978-0-340-90816-7, 2 April 2006
- In the Footsteps of St Paul (Hodder & Stoughton), ISBN 978-0-340-86186-8, 20 May 2004
- Absolute Truth: The Catholic Church Today (Viking Press), ISBN 978-0-670-87967-0, 1 October 1998
- It's a PC World: What It Means to Live in a Land Gone Politically Correct (Hodder & Stoughton), ISBN 978-0-340-95486-7, 13 November 2008
- Diary of a Dog-Walker: Time Spent Following a Lead (Doubleday), ISBN 978-0-85752-007-4, 9 June 2011
- Cruel Crossing: Escaping Hitler Across the Pyrenees (Doubleday), ISBN 978-0-85752-051-7, 25 April 2013
- Auntie's War: The BBC During the Second World War (Doubleday), ISBN 978-0-857-52332-7, 2 November 2017
- Confessions: Life re-examined (Doubleday), ISBN 978-0-857-52833-9, 26 January 2023
