= Alex Massie (journalist) =

British journalist (born 1974)

Alex Massie (born 1 July 1974) is a Scottish journalist based in Edinburgh. He has been the Scotland editor for The Spectator, and writes political columns for The Times and The Sunday Times.

== Early life ==
The son of the journalist and writer Allan Massie (1938–2026), Massie was educated at St. Mary's School, Melrose, Glenalmond College in Perthshire and at Trinity College Dublin, where he edited T.C.D. Miscellany. He was also an active member of the University Philosophical Society, one of the college's main debating societies. Massie applied to Cambridge University twice and was rejected both times.

In 1997, he won the John Smith Memorial Mace debating competition, speaking with Matthew Magee and representing the University Philosophical Society. Formerly The Observer Mace, the competition was renamed in 1995 and is run by the English-Speaking Union.

== Career ==
Massie is Scotland editor of The Spectator, a columnist for the Scottish edition of The Times, and a regular contributor to Border Television as well as BBC Television and Radio. Prior to this, he edited a political blog, The Debatable Land.

He was previously Washington correspondent for The Scotsman and assistant editor of Scotland on Sunday. He has also written for The Washington Post, Politico, The Daily Telegraph, The New Republic, Foreign Policy, The Sunday Times, The Daily Beast, the Los Angeles Times, the Scottish Daily Mail, National Review Online, The Sunday Telegraph, The New York Times, The American Conservative, Time, Bloomberg Businessweek, The Observer, the New Statesman, The Big Issue, Slate, CapX, the Irish Independent, Newsweek and The Sunday Business Post. Since January 2009 he has written a blog that is published by The Spectator. In 2012 he was short-listed in the blog section for the Orwell Prize for political writing.

On 18 January 2014, Massie appeared in a BBC Referendum debate as an 'undecided voter'. On 27 August 2015, Massie wrote an article for The Times titled 'BBC 'bias' against independence was essential'.

In November 2018, Massie wrote an article for The Spectator suggesting that France should reasonably honour Philippe Pétain for his service in World War I separating his legacy of service from his later career as the head of the collaborationist regime of Vichy France, from 1940 to 1944, during World War II. He wrote the book reviews for the 2020 edition of Wisden Cricketers' Almanack.

In a January 2021 opinion piece titled "Self-ID is a fantasy that hurts trans people", Massie stated: "We pretend that women can — and do — commit rape… In England and Wales 436 male-bodied sex offenders were classified as women from 2012 to 2018." The article was later ruled to be inaccurate by the Independent Press Standards Organisation (IPSO), following which The Times published a correction.

== Personal life ==
Massie plays for Selkirk Cricket Club and supports Scottish football side Heart of Midlothian.
