= Colin MacKay (journalist, born 1944) =

Scottish journalist (1944–2023)

Colin H. MacKay
- An undated photo of MacKay
- Born: August 27, 1944; Glasgow, Scotland
- Died: November 10, 2023 (aged 79)
- Education: Jordanhill College of Education, University of Glasgow (MA)

Colin Hinshelwood MacKay (27 August 1944 – 10 November 2023) was a Scottish journalist who served as political editor of STV for nineteen years. He also worked in radio broadcasting for sixteen years.

== Early life and education ==
Colin Hinshelwood MacKay was born in Glasgow on 27 August 1944. His mother Charlotte was a housewife and his father was Charles MacKay, a doctor of midwifery and gynecology who served as group medical superintendent of Glasgow's Southern General Hospital for twenty years before his death in 1963. MacKay had two brothers, Charles and Stewart, and grew up within the hospital grounds.

MacKay was educated at Kelvinside Academy and later published a book on the school. While studying there, he became lifelong friends with Alan Rodger (later Lord Rodger of Earlsferry), the son of his father's colleague Ferguson Rodger.

After leaving school, he studied at Jordanhill College of Education. He later studied at the University of Glasgow, joining the university's Liberal Club and debating society through Glasgow University Union, becoming convener of the latter group. In March 1967, he and his teammate Matthew J. McQueen won the National Union of Students' competition for the Observer Mace, making them the sixth team from the university to do so. Following their victory, MacKay embarked on a British Information Services-sponsored tour of Canada with a new teammate.

MacKay was awarded a Master of Arts degree in 1966 with honours in English, before studying for a diploma in education.

== Career ==
In 1967, MacKay began working for Border Television as a reporter and presenter. After three years at Border, he joined Grampian Television.

Following James Gordon's exit in 1973, MacKay became the second political editor of STV. In the same year, he began hosting the channel's politics programme Ways and Means. After he left that role in 1986, he began reporting on the British Parliament from London. From 1990, he was the lead presenter on Scottish Questions.

From 1988 until 1994, he sat on the board of the Scottish Arts Council.

=== Radio career ===
After leaving STV in 1992, MacKay began a sixteen-year radio career, starting as the presenter of Talk-In Sunday on Radio Clyde. He later joined BBC Radio Scotland where he hosted a weekly politics show called People and Power. He then hosted Politics Tonight for the same radio station.

In 1997, he was named BT Scottish Radio News Broadcaster of the Year.

=== Later career ===
MacKay retired from front-line journalism in December 2008. He continued to work freelance with the BBC, handling viewer complaints, until weeks before his death in November 2023.

== Personal life ==
MacKay married Olive Brownlie in 1982 and had two sons, David and Andrew.

=== Death and legacy ===
MacKay died on 10 November 2023, at the age of 79.

In the aftermath of his death, many fellow journalists paid tribute, including Fiona Ross, and Bernard Ponsonby. Colin Mackay, STV's political editor who shared his name and former position, stated that he was "very sad" at his death and that he was a "great broadcaster, interviewer, and lovely person." He was remembered by several politicians, including former first minister Alex Salmond, Lord Foulkes of Cumnock, Lord Forsyth of Drumlean, Jim Sillars and former prime minister Gordon Brown. Richard Rose, a prominent political scientist in Scotland, also paid tribute.

== Published works ==
- Kelvinside Academy, 1878–1978 (1978)
