= English-Speaking Union =

Educational organisation

- Abbreviation: ESU
- Established: 1918; 108 years ago
- Founder: Sir Evelyn Wrench
- Type: Educational charity
- Headquarters: Dartmouth House
- Location: London, England
- Region served: International
- Official language: English
- Chairman: Miles Young
- Director-General: Charles Byrne CBE
- Website: www.esu.org
- Formerly called: English Speaking Union of the Commonwealth

The English-Speaking Union (ESU) is an international educational membership organisation headquartered in London, England. Founded by the journalist Sir Evelyn Wrench in 1918, it aims to bring together and empower people of different languages and cultures, by building skills and confidence in communication, such that individuals realise their potential. With 35 branches in the United Kingdom and over 50 international ESUs in countries around the world, the ESU carries out a variety of activities such as debating, public speaking and student exchange programmes, runs conferences and seminars, and offers scholarships, to encourage the effective use of the English language around the globe.

The aims of the English-Speaking Union, taken from the ESU's Royal Charter, are:

1. The mutual advancement of education of the English-speaking world, respecting the traditions and heritage of those with whom we work whilst acknowledging the current events and issues that affect them.
2. The use of English as a shared language and means of international communication of knowledge and understanding, provided always that these are at all times pursued in a non-political and non-sectarian manner.

== Governance ==
The ESU was established in 1918 through the efforts of Sir Evelyn Wrench. In 1957 it received a Royal Charter, with Queen Elizabeth II as the royal patron. Princess Anne, The Princess Royal, has been president since 2013, having taken over from her father Prince Philip, Duke of Edinburgh who served from 1952 to 2012. Headquartered at Dartmouth House on Charles Street, Mayfair, its many activities are coordinated by the director-general. The sixteen-member board of governors meets four times a year, and is presided over by the chair.

Directors-general

- Sir Frederick Whyte (1938)
- Air Chief Marshal Sir Douglas Evill (1947–1949)
- Frank Darvall (1949–1957)
- Air Chief Marshal Sir Francis Fogarty (1957–1964)
- Morris Barr (1964–?)
- Wynn Hugh-Jones (1973–1977)
- Major-General David Crichton Alexander (1977–1979)
- Alan Lee Williams (1979–1986)
- Richard Heaslip (1987–1989)
- David Hicks (1989–1991)
- David Thorp (1991–1994)
- Valerie Mitchell (1994–2009)
- Mike Lake (2009–2011)
- Peter Kyle (2011–2014)
- Jane Easton (2014–2024)
- Charles Byrne CBE (2024-)

Chairs

- Peter Jennings (2014–2015)
- Paul Boateng, Baron Boateng (2015–2019)
- James Raven (2019–2021)
- Miles Young (2021–2022)
- Philip Maunder (interim) (2022–2023)
- Miles Young (2023–)

== Oracy ==
The ESU believes oracy – speaking and listening skills – should be at the centre of the school curriculum, and actively encourages the development of these skills through education and competition.

The ESU's education department runs The ESU Schools Mace, the oldest and largest debating competition for schools in England. Several alumni have gone on to be part of Team England or Team Wales (both funded and managed by the ESU) at the annual World Schools Debating Championships – a two-week tournament whose recent venues include Peru, Cape Town, Turkey and Thailand.

Speech-led competitions include Performing Shakespeare (a national contest for secondary school students), the ESU-Churchill National Public Speaking Competition for Schools and the International Public Speaking Competition, which reaches over one million young people in more than 50 countries every year. National winners meet in London for the final, part of a five-day programme of events including public speaking, debating and performance workshops, and cultural excursions.

Alongside these competitions, the ESU also runs games-led debate and public speaking workshops in schools, guides schools on setting up and maintaining their own debate clubs, and provides a range of Continuing Professional Development (CPD) opportunities for teachers in the fields of speech and debate.

== Secondary School Exchange Programme ==
British students, having completed their A-Levels, can spend two or three terms at a private prep school in the United States or Canada during their gap year. In return American students come to British schools. Originally known as the British and American Schoolboy and Schoolgirl Exchange, the programme was created in 1928. Former British ESU student exchange scholars include:

- Sir Ian Blair (Harvard-Westlake School) – commissioner of the Metropolitan Police
- Sir John Bond (Cate School 1959) – chairman of HSBC
- Sir Richard Dearlove (Kent School) – director of MI6
- Dawn French (Spence School) – actress and comedian
- Michael Davies (Mercersburg Academy) – television producer/personality
- Chris Hawkins (Tabor Academy) – radio presenter
- KT Tunstall (Kent School) – popular musician
- Quentin Letts (Bellarmine College) – writer
- Tim Footman (Appleby College) – writer.

American ESU student exchange scholars include:

- Howard Dean – former Governor of Vermont and U.S. presidential candidate
- Heather J. Sharkey – historian in the Department of Near Eastern Languages & Civilizations at the University of Pennsylvania

== The US–UK Debate Tour Exchange ==
Two outstanding British student debaters are chosen each year to tour approximately 30 states over three months. The ESU USA Tour is one of the most prestigious awards in university debating. In return two American debaters visit universities and institutions in the UK. The programme was established in 1922. Alumni of the British team include:

- Rab Butler (1924) – Chancellor of the Exchequer, Foreign Secretary
- Michael Ramsey (1925) -Archbishop of Canterbury
- Hans-Jürgen von Blumenthal (1930) – member of the July 20 Plot to assassinate Hitler
- Michael Foot (1934) – leader of the Labour Party
- Edward Heath (1939) – Prime Minister
- Tony Benn (1947) – Labour cabinet minister
- Robin Day (1949) – broadcaster
- William Rees-Mogg (1951) – editor of The Times
- Patrick Mayhew (1953) – Northern Ireland Secretary
- Brian Walden (1958) – broadcaster
- Leon Brittan (1961) – vice-president of the European Commission
- Michael Howard (1963) – leader of the Conservative Party
- Jonathan Aitken (1964) – Conservative politician and former journalist
- Norman Lamont (1965) – Chancellor of the Exchequer
- Peter Bazalgette (1976) – businessman with interests in the media
- Nicholas Mostyn (1981) – High Court judge
- Ian Duncan (1995) – MEP and UK Government minister
- Lewis Iwu (2010) – director, Fair Education Alliance

as well as a significant number of MPs, QCs and other notable figures.

== International ESUs ==
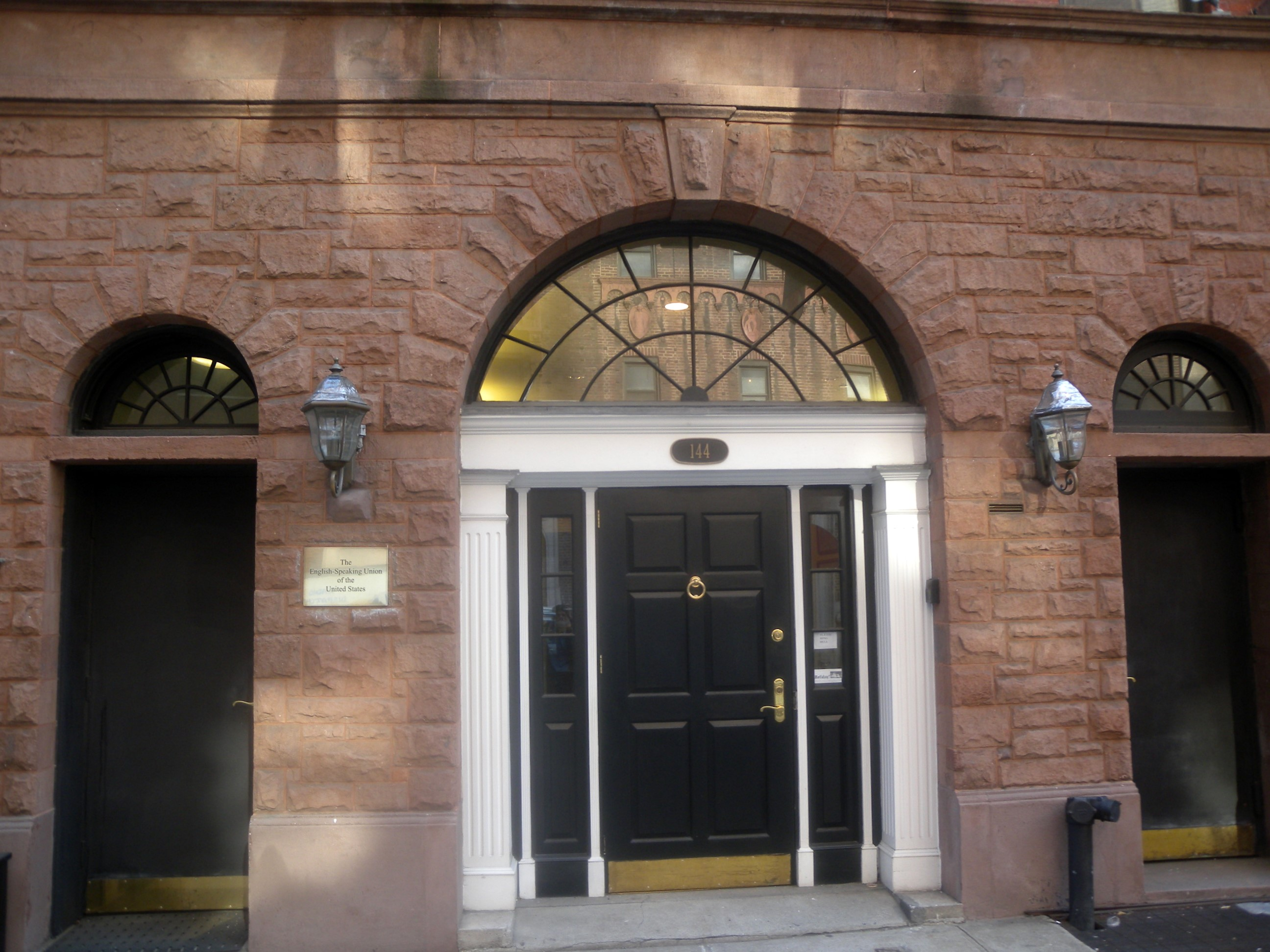
The New York headquarters

The ESU's International Headquarters is located in London, and there are about 54 national ESUs around the world.

=== Australia ===
Charles Duguid, Scottish medical practitioner and Aboriginal rights activist, helped to found the Australian branch of the ESU in Adelaide, South Australia in 1923, and was chairman from 1932 to 1935. The South Australia branch was followed by the New South Wales branch, also founded in 1923.

The Australian English-Speaking Union is a federation of the five Australian branches of the ESU: Australian Capital Territory, New South Wales, South Australia, Queensland and Victoria.

== Music scholarships ==
The ESU offers funding for places at top conservatoires for music students. Alumni include Tasmin Little and Nigel Kennedy, both violinists.

== Lindemann Trust Fellowship ==
The Lindemann Trust Fellowships are a prestigious research grant awarded to postdoctoral scientists of "exceptional promise" in the pure and applied physical sciences, designed to enable British and Commonwealth citizens resident in the UK to perform research in the USA. They have been administered by the ESU since 1972 and were established as a result of a bequest from Brigadier Charles Lindemann. Brigadier Lindemann trained as a physicist with his brother, Lord Cherwell, at the University of Berlin, after which he served as scientific advisor of the British Army and subsequently at the British Embassy in Washington during the Second World War. The Lindemann Fellowships were created as a result of his will, where Brigadier Lindemann directed that his residual estate "be used to assist men and women with outstanding potential to become distinguished scholars or teachers in their chosen field".

Fellowships are awarded following a rigorous application process, undertaken by a committee, chaired by Professor James Raven, deputy chairman of the ESU, which represents the full range of scientific fields eligible for a fellowship. In 2017 the panel comprised: Professor Dirk Aarts – Christ Church; Professor Paul Beer – Wadham College; Professor Ben Berks – Wadham College; Professor Roger Davies – Christ Church; Dr Martin Grossel – Southampton; Dr Karen Mooney-McAuley – Queens University Belfast; Professor Sir David Read – Royal Society and Professor Mary Rees – Liverpool University.

== See also ==
- English-Speaking Union Scotland
- John Smith Memorial Mace
- ESU Schools Mace

== Notes ==
By ISO 639-3 code
Enter an ISO code to find the corresponding language article.
