= Monument to the French Declaration of the Rights of Man and of the Citizen =

Monument in Paris, Champ de Mars

- Monument des Droits de l’Homme et du Citoyen
- Interactive map of Monument to the French Declaration of the Rights of Man and of the Citizen
- Location: Paris, Champ de Mars
- Coordinates: 48.8552°N 2.3011°E
- Designer: Ivan Theimer
- Material: Freestone and bronze
- Beginning date: 1988
- Completion date: 1992
- Restored date: 2016

The Monument to the French Declaration of the Rights of Man and of the Citizen or Monument des Droits de l’Homme et du Citoyen in French, is located in Paris, in the Champs de Mars gardens on Avenue Charles-Risler. Commissioned by the City of Paris, it was erected in 1989 on the occasion of the bicentennial of the French Revolution. Inspired by Egyptian mastaba tombs, it includes many references to revolutionary imagery. It is the work of the Czech sculptor Ivan Theimer.

The monument is composed of several elements:

- a freestone square plane construction, opening into an octagonal interior space, lit from above, its external facades are adorned with graven texts, various reliefs and 12 stones inlaid with bronze seals, one for each of the European Community member states in 1989;
- two bronze obelisks covered with a profusion of finely detailed symbols and texts, including that of the 1789 French Declaration of the Rights of Man and of the Citizen;
- a statue of a man wearing a toga and holding several documents in his hands;
- the statue of a man inviting onlookers to read the texts carved on the obelisks;
- the statue of a woman with a child who wears a hat made of newspaper (chronology of the events of 1989);

On the southwest façade (closest to the Champs de Mars) are:

- a triangle; symbol frequently used by Freemasons to evoke the loftiness of human thought;
- a text commemorating the bicentennial of the French 1789 Declaration of the Rights of Man and of the Citizen is carved in the stone;
- a sundial

On the northeast facade, nearest rue de Belgrade :

- a bronze door framed by two columns : numerous reliefs and images of historical documents of the revolutionary period are to be found on the door;
- an oculus located above the door represents an Ouroboros

On the two other facades stones are carved with the names and the seal of each of the 12 capital cities of the European Community member countries in 1989:

- On the northeast side: Lisboa - Madrid - Paris - Bruss/xelles - London - Dublin
- On the southeast side: Αθήνα - Roma - Luxembourg - Bonn - Amsterdam - Kobenhavn

The entire structure is set on an elevated podium two steps above ground level. Bronze fire pots are set on each corner of the podium.

== Bibliography ==
- [collective] (1989). Yvan Theimer : "Monument à la déclaration des droits de l'homme et du citoyen". Ville de Paris. ISBN 2-86903-042-8.
- Julien Feydy, "Le Temple des droits de l'Homme d'Ivan Theimer : de la commémoration à la pédagogie politique", L'Age d'homme, Paris, 1997, ISBN 2-8251-1083-3
