= The Only Running Footman =

Pub in London

The Footman
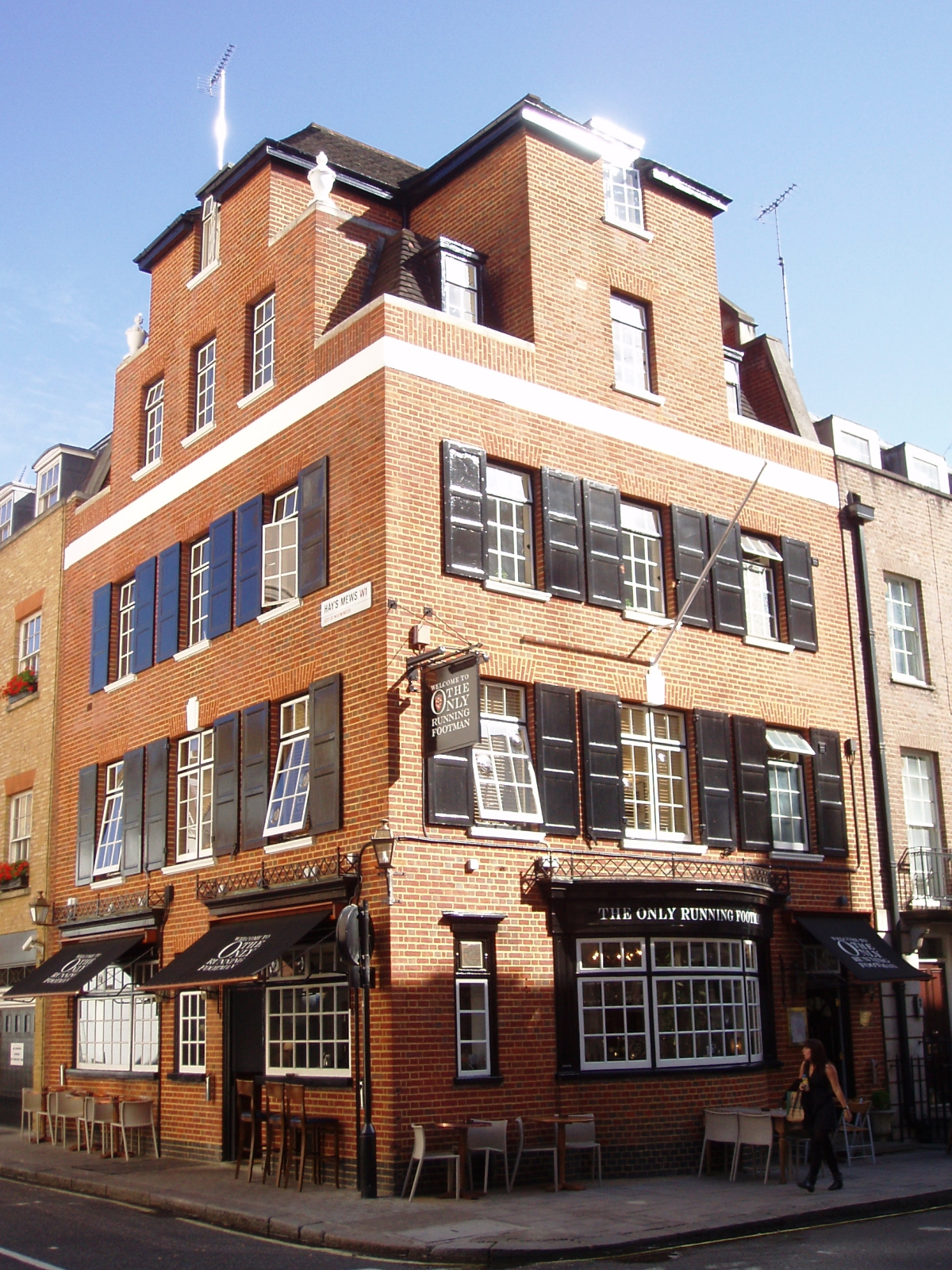
- The Only Running Footman in 2008
- Interactive map of the The Footman area
- Etymology: footman

General information
- Location: London, 5 Charles Street, Mayfair, London W1J 5DF
- Coordinates: 51°30′31″N 0°08′46″W

Website
- http://www.thefootmanmayfair.com/

The Only Running Footman (also referred to as The Footman) is a public house in Charles Street, Mayfair, long famous for its sign, which used to read, in full, I am the only Running Footman. At 24 characters, this was the longest pub name in London until modern pubs were created with fanciful names (such as Chelsea's The Ferret and Firkin in The Balloon Up The Creek).

Formerly the "Running Horse", the establishment was first built in 1749 and rebuilt in the 1930s.

The pub is variously said to be named after a retired footman who bought the establishment and named it after himself, or via its then owner William Douglas, 4th Duke of Queensberry, who employed a footman "said to be able to keep up a respectable 8 mph". Footmen were originally employed to run ahead of a carriage to ensure the way was clear. As roads got better and clearer the demand for their services fell away and many were re-employed as household servants.

The pub is believed to have been the inspiration for the Junior Ganymede Club, a fictional club in P. G. Wodehouse's Jeeves stories. It is a significant location in Martha Grimes's 1986 mystery novel I Am the Only Running Footman, which takes its title from the pub.
