= Charles Street, Mayfair =

Street in Mayfair, London

Coordinates: 51°30′28″N 0°08′50″W

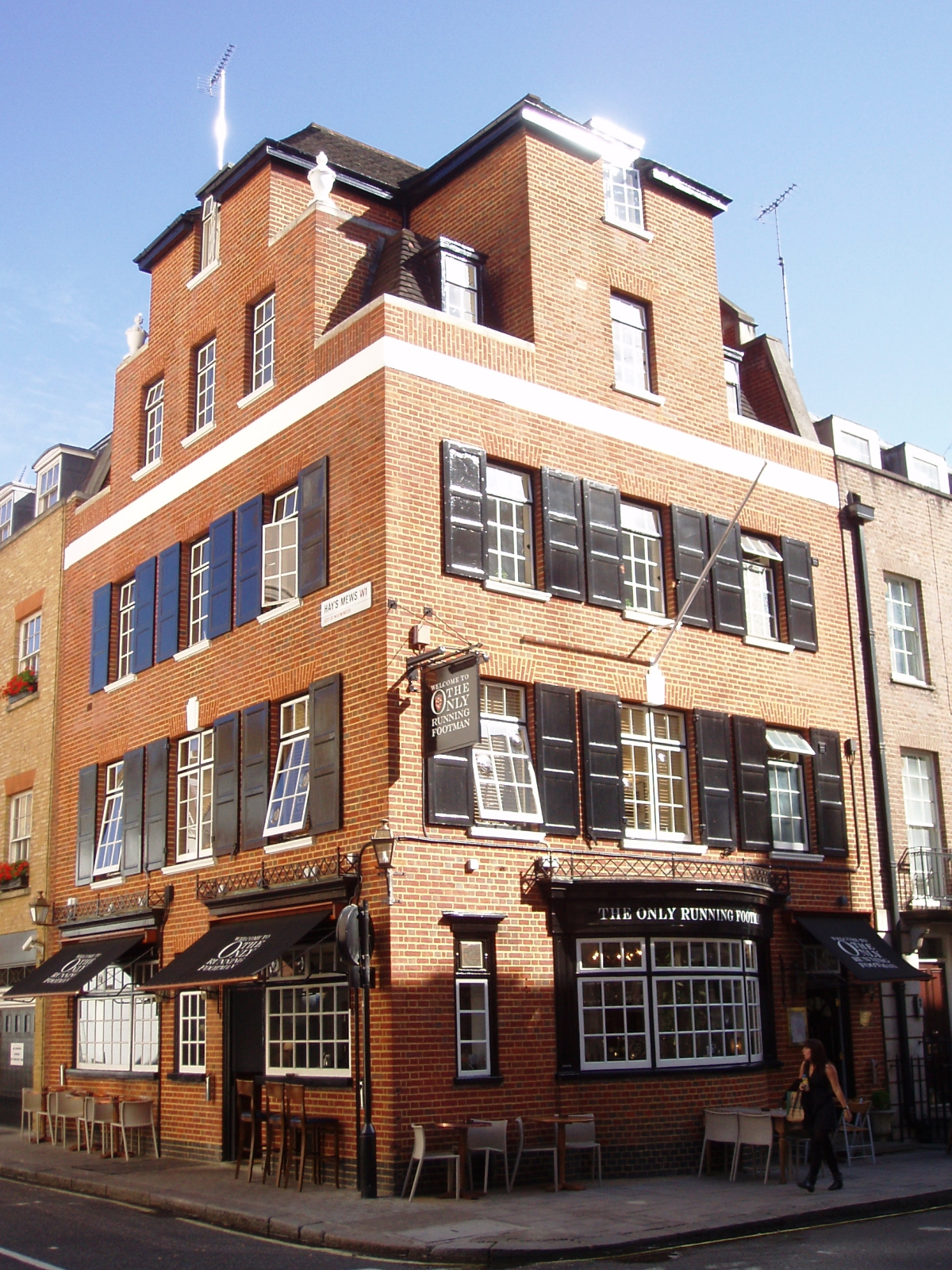
The Only Running Footman, a public house in Charles Street

Charles Street is a street in the Mayfair area of the City of Westminster, London. Many buildings along the street are listed by Historic England and a number have had distinguished residents over the years.

== Location ==
Charles Street runs roughly north-east from Waverton Street in the west to Berkeley Square in the east, bending slightly northward halfway along. The southwestern end is narrower. It is within the Mayfair Conservation Area.

== History ==
The street is named after a member of the Berkeley family, and it was built when Lord Berkeley's estate was developed. Most properties along the street were constructed between about 1745 and 1750, chiefly by carpenter John Phillips. Many of them are now listed by Historic England. Most early residents were upper class and wealthy. There were no shops.

After the death of Edward Bulwer Lytton in 1873, a proposal was made to rename the street as Lytton Street. Lytton had resided at 8 Charles Street for two years from 1837. After the success of his novel The Last days of Pompeii, Lytton decked out the drawing room of no. 8 into a replica of a chamber seen at Pompeii. The renaming was quashed following objections from residents led by Lady Dorothy Nevill.

The Cosmopolitan Club met at 30 Charles Street until its demise in 1903.

In 1970, a block consisting of nos. 6–14 Charles Street and 4–12 Hays Mews was the subject of a planning application for a 250–300 bedroom hotel designed by Sir Hugh Casson. Westminster Council's planning department rejected the plan. Alderman David Cobbold, chairman of the planning committee, commented that the scheme was ". . . an inadequate substitute for Charles Street — a street of high intrinsic value".

== Notable residents ==
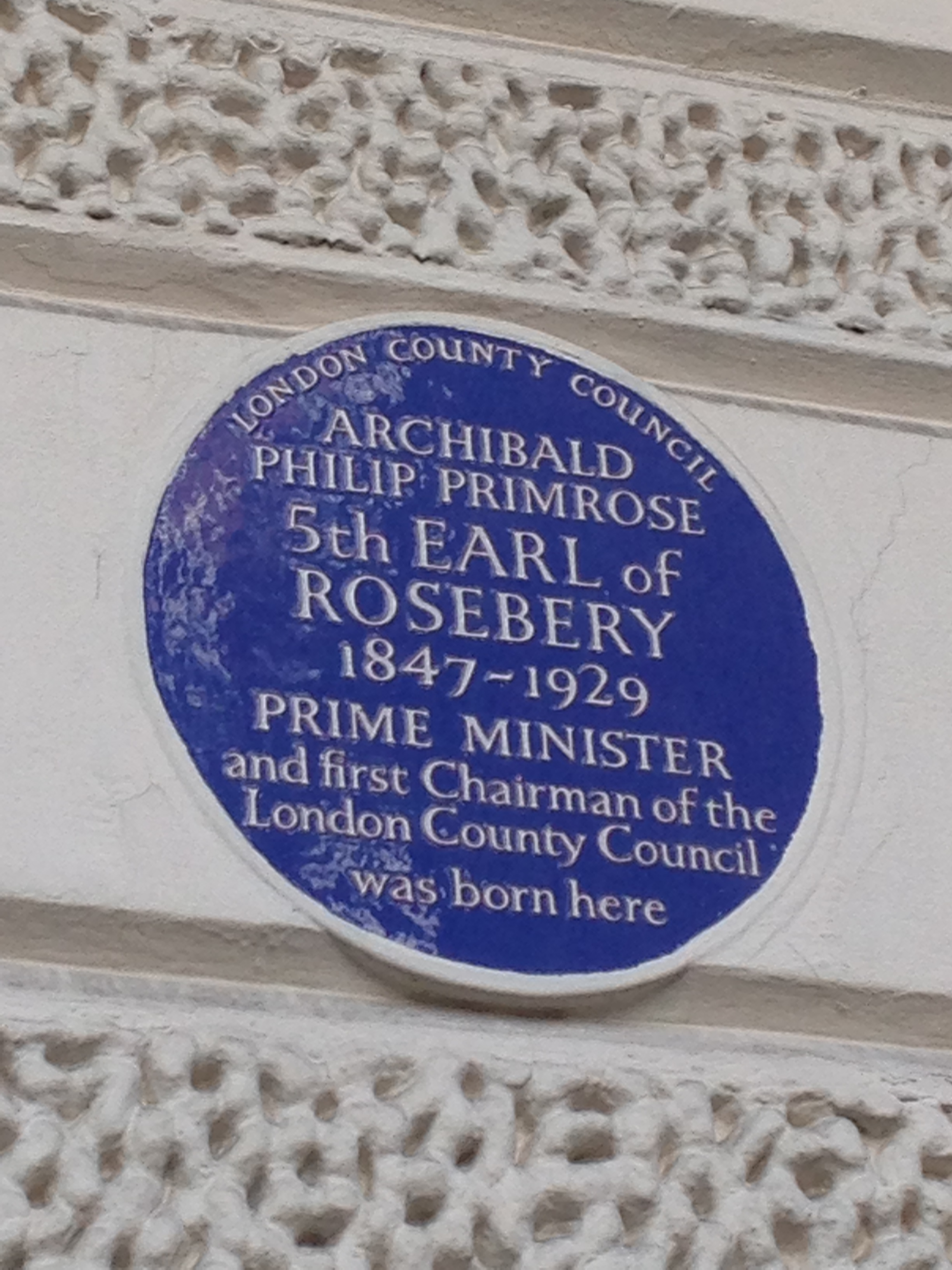
Blue plaque to the 5th Earl of Rosebery in Charles Street

- Charles Towneley, MP for Sligo and a family trustee at the British Museum lived at number 14 in 1850.
- Archibald Primrose, 5th Earl of Rosebery, British prime minister, was born in his father's house at 20 Charles Street in 1847.
- Claude Watney lived at 20 Charles Street in the early 1900s.
- Sydney Smith, wit, writer, and Anglican cleric resided at number 33.
- Major-General Villiers Hatton lived at 34 Charles Street at the time of his death in 1914.
- Beau Brummell, the famed dandy resided at no. 42, circa 1792.
- Society hostess, Lady Dorothy Nevill lived at no. 45 from 1873 until her death there in 1913. Her son, Mayfair historian, Ralph Nevill grew up in the house.
- Francis Chantrey, sculptor.

== Listed buildings ==
=== Grade II* ===
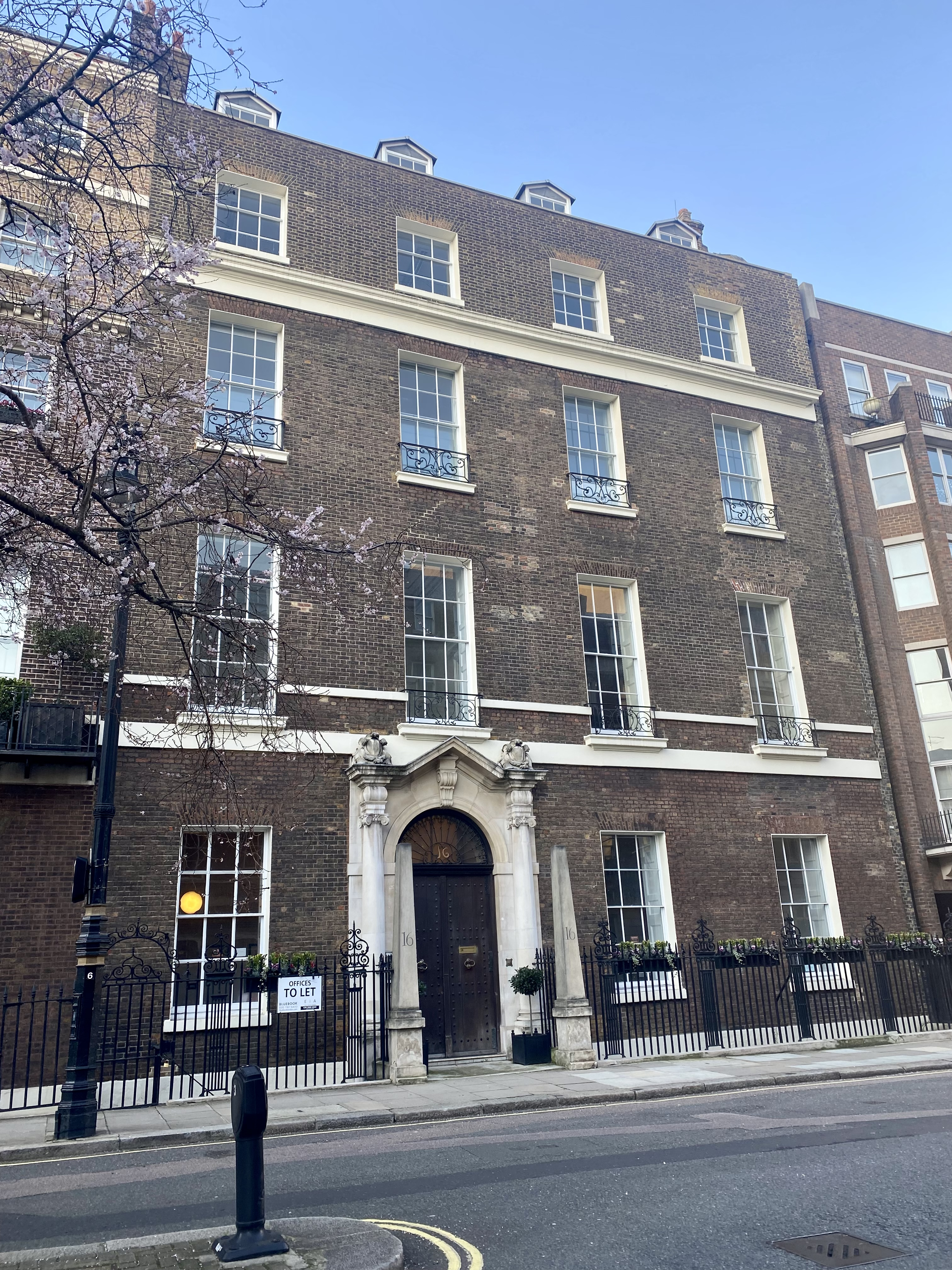
- 16 Charles Street, January 2022
  16 Charles Street is a Grade II* listed four-storey town house with basement and attic, built in 1753 for Francis Willoughby, 2nd Baron Middleton. After Willoughby's death, the house was bought by the Craven family. William Craven, 1st Earl of Craven was the first family member to permanently reside there. The Craven's tenure came to an end after the death in 1883 of George Craven, 3rd Earl. Charles Magniac, MP for Bedford occupied the house in 1885. The next owner was William McEwan MP and founder of Scottish brewers, McEwan's. The house was bequeathed to McEwan's stepdaughter, the society hostess Margaret Greville, who in 1913–14 commissioned extensions and a remodelled interior by architects Mewes and Davis. Between the two World Wars, royal guests at 16 Charles Street included Prince of Wales (later Edward VIII), Fuad I of Egypt, and monarchs of Greece and Spain. Joachim von Ribbentrop, German Ambassador to the United Kingdom was also a guest. The building was used by the Guards Club from 1945 until 1976. Externally, the building features obelisk stone gate piers and a stone Ionic columned doorway.
- 22 Charles Street was originally a three-storey terraced house with basement, built circa 1753 by William Timbrell and John Phillips. Two attic storeys were added in the early to mid-nineteenth century. Listed as Grade II* by English Heritage since 9 January 1970, it has been the residence of the Duke of Clarence (later William IV), Edward Bulwer-Lytton, Edward Law, 1st Earl of Ellenborough and Anne Grenville.
- 37 and 38 Charles Street, originally two separate houses, were combined to form a grand mansion in 1890–91 by William Cubitt & Co for the banker Edward Baring, 1st Baron Revelstoke. The mansion was acquired by William Legge, 6th Earl of Dartmouth, who named it Dartmouth House. Since 1926, Dartmouth House has been the home of the educational charity, English-Speaking Union. Art historian, Bevis Hillier wrote in 1970, that it is "by far the grandest building in Charles Street". The building has been Grade II* listed since 1 December 1987.
- 39 Charles Street, a three-storey terrace house, was built from 1750 to 1753. It has been listed as Grade II* since 24 February 1958.
- 40 Charles Street, a four-storey terrace house, was built from 1750 to 1753 by John Phillips and George Shakespear. It has been listed as Grade II* since 24 February 1958.
- 41 Charles Street, a three-storey terrace house, was built from 1750 to 1753 by John Phillips and George Shakespear. It has been listed as Grade II* since 24 February 1958.

=== Grade II ===
- 2 Charles Street, a three-storey house, was built in the eighteenth century. It has been listed as Grade II by English Heritage since 1 December 1987. William Seymour Conway, Member of Parliament for Orford is noted residing here in a 1792 directory.
- 7 Charles Street is a five-storey house built with Portland stone. It has been listed as Grade II since 1 December 1987.
- 8 Charles Street is a four-storey house built circa 1753. It has been listed as Grade II since 1 December 1987.
- 10 Charles Street, a four-storey terrace house with Doric columns on the porch, was built circa 1753. It has been listed as Grade II by English Heritage since 9 January 1970.
- 17 Charles Street, a five-storey terrace house, was built circa 1753. It has been listed as Grade II by English Heritage since 9 January 1970.
- 18 Charles Street, a four-storey terrace house, was built circa 1753. It has been listed as Grade II by English Heritage since 9 January 1970.
- 18a Charles Street, a four-storey terrace house on the corner of Charles Street and Chesterfield Hill, was built from 1750 to 1753. It has been listed as Grade II by English Heritage since 1 December 1987.
- 18B, 19A and 19 Charles Street are four-storey houses built with Bath stone, circa 1900. They have been listed as Grade II by English Heritage since 1 December 1987. 19A has been the Burma/Myanmar Embassy since 1951.
- 20, Charles Street, a three-storey terrace house, was built from 1750 to 1753. It has been listed as Grade II by English Heritage since 9 January 1970.
- 21 Charles Street, a three-storey terrace house, was built from 1750 to 1753. It has been listed as Grade II by English Heritage since 23 December 1969.
- 23 Charles Street, a four-storey terrace house, was built circa 1753. It has been listed as Grade II by English Heritage since 1 December 1987.
- 25, 26 and 27 Charles Street, three four-storey terrace houses, were built circa 1753. They have been listed as Grade II by English Heritage since 9 January 1970.
- 27a Charles Street, a three-storey terrace house on the corner of Charles Street and Waverton Street, was built in the late eighteenth century. It has been listed as Grade II by English Heritage since 9 January 1970.
- 28 Charles Street, also known as Crewe House, is a detached mansion built by Edward Shepherd in 1730. It has been listed as Grade II* since 24 February 1958.
- 29 Charles Street, a four-storey terrace house, was built from 1710 to 1753. It has been listed as Grade II by English Heritage since 24 February 1958.

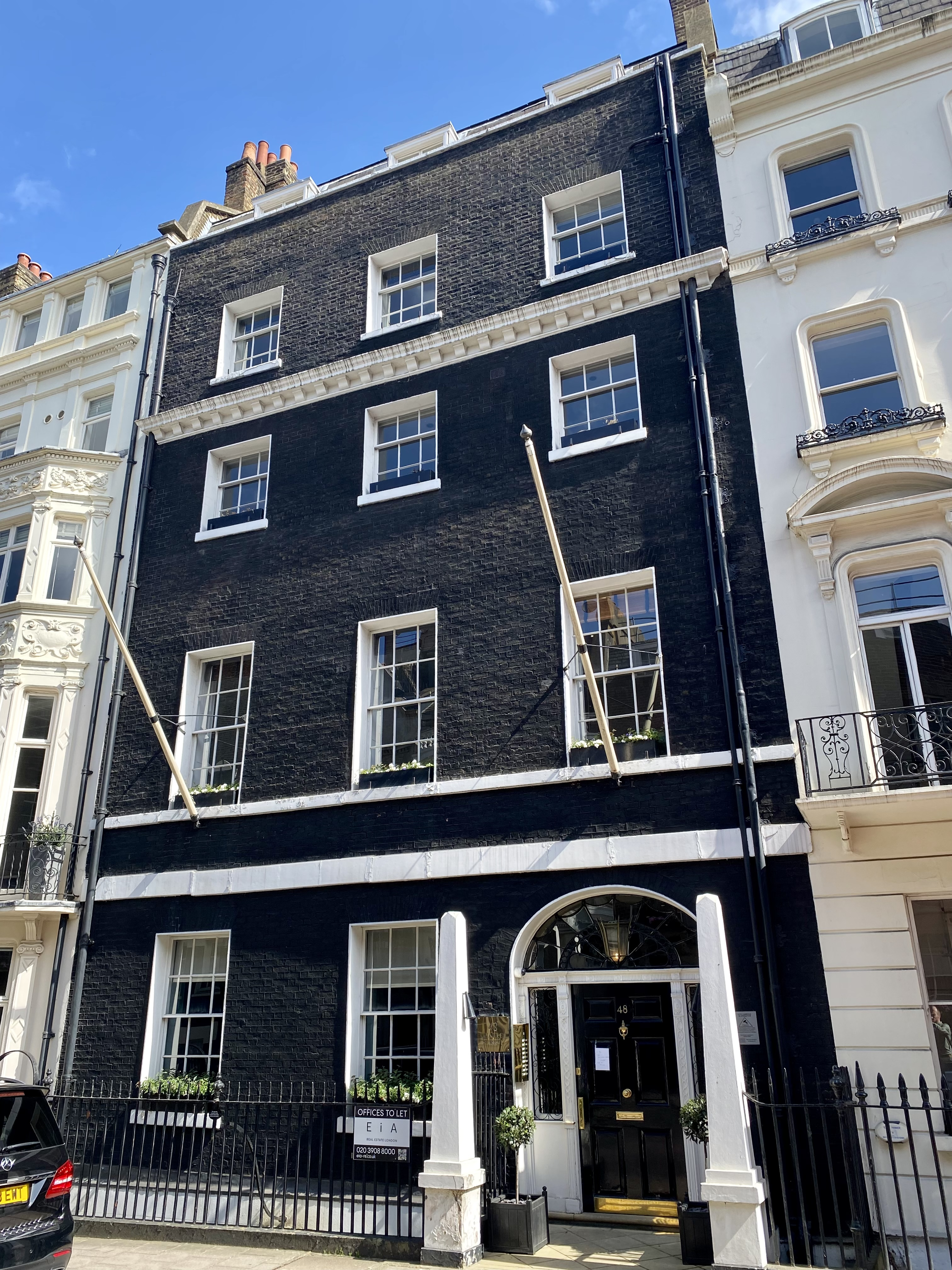
48 Charles Street in May 2022

- 48 Charles Street is a four-storey terraced house plus attic and basement, built from 1750 to 1753 probably by John Phillips and George Shakespear. Listed as Grade II since 24 February 1958, it is identifiable by its stone obelisk gate piers. In 1970, when occupied by book publisher, Heinemann, it retained a "magnificent" ballroom and original kitchen. Winston Churchill lived here when a young boy.
- 50 Charles Street, a three-storey terrace house, was built from 1751 to 1752 by John Phillips and George Shakespear. It has been listed as Grade II by English Heritage since 1 December 1987.
- 51 Charles Street, a four-storey house, was built in the mid-19th century. It has been listed as Grade II by English Heritage since 3 October 2000.
- 52 and 52a Charles Street, a four-storey house on the corner of Charles Street and Berkeley Square, was built from 1750 to 1770. It has been listed as Grade II by English Heritage since 24 February 1958.

== See also ==
- The Only Running Footman
- Mark's Club
- Cosmopolitan Club (London)
