= Pierre-Victor Galland =

French painter

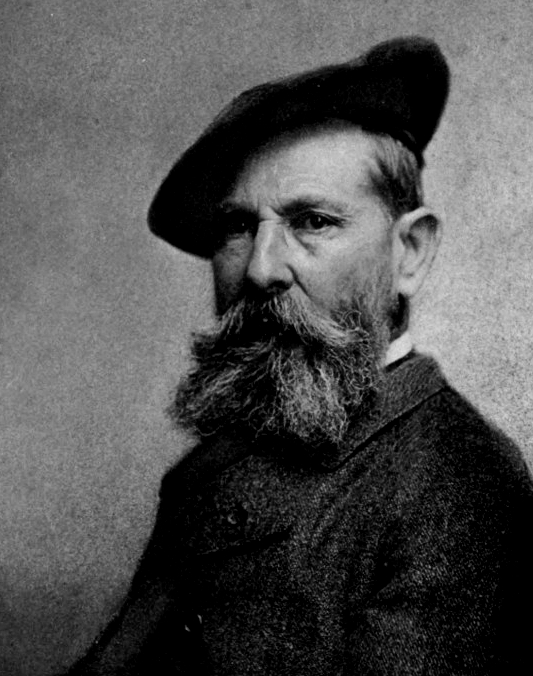
Pierre-Victor Galland

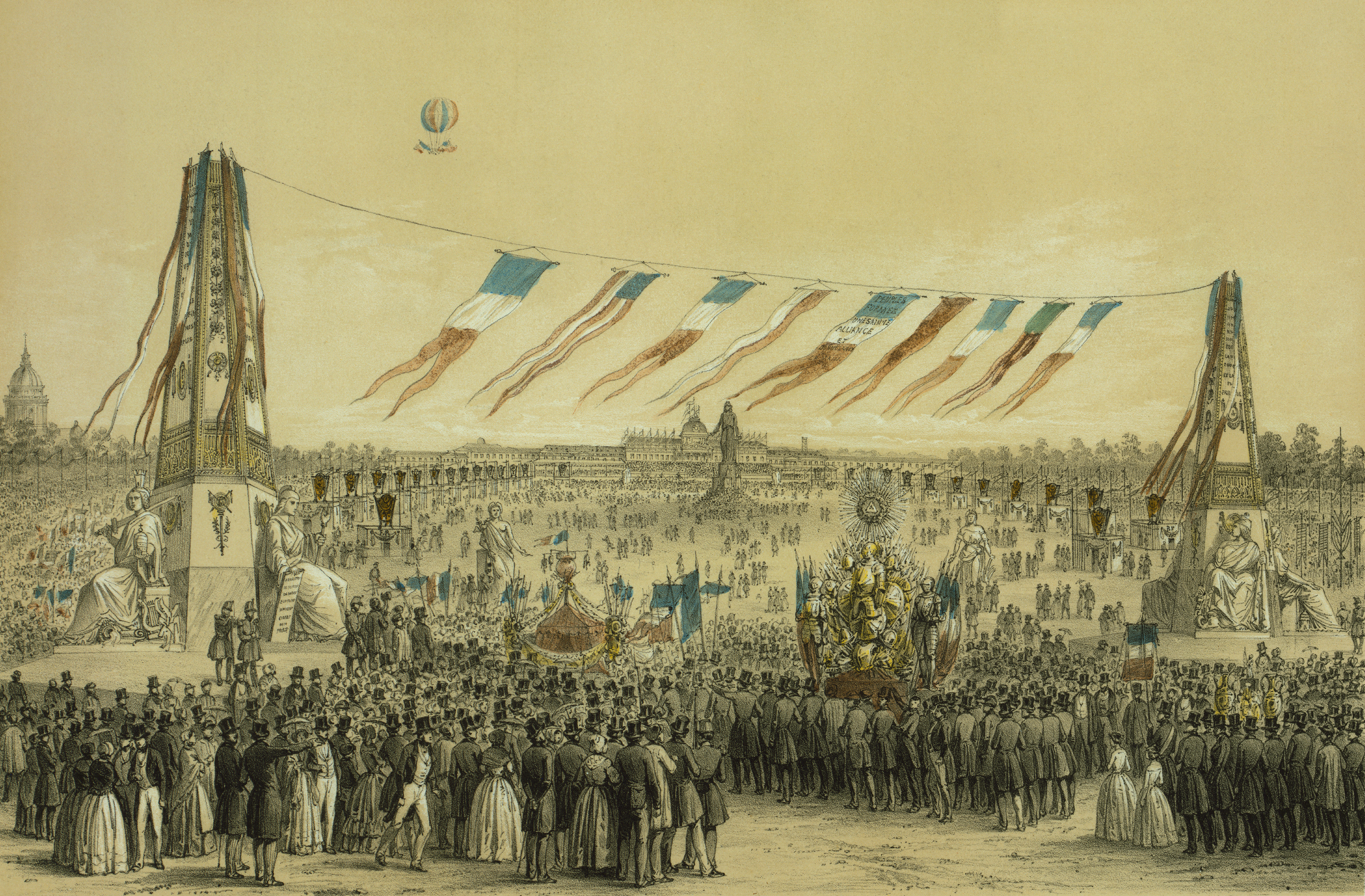
View of the 1848 Fête de la Concorde, which Pierre-Victor Galland helped to decorate.

Pierre-Victor Galland (Geneva, 15 July 1822 – Paris, 30 November 1892) was a French decorative painter.

Until the age of 16, Galland studied metalwork with his father, Jacques Galland, a goldsmith. He then joined the studio of Henri Labrouste, studying architecture. After two years of training, Labrouste encouraged him to pursue his interest in decorative art under the direction of Michel Martin Drolling. In 1843, the decorative painter Pierre-Luc-Charles Ciceri (1782–1868) hired Galland to assist with the painting of figures, flowers, fruit, and garlands. In 1848, he again worked with Labrouste, in 1848, on the decoration of the Fête de la Concorde.

Galland was responsible for the ceiling of the grand staircase at Dartmouth House in Mayfair, London, England.

Marcel de Chollet was one of his students at the École nationale supérieure des Beaux-Arts.

== Bibliography ==
- Pierre-Victor Galland, Un Tiepolo français au XIXe siècle. Published in 2006, Somogy, Piscine-musée d'art et d'industrie André Diligent, Musée départemental de l'Oise (Paris, Roubaix, Beauvais). ISBN 978-2-7572-0027-8. (in French)
