= Fête de la Concorde =

Coordinates: 48°51′22″N 2°17′54″E

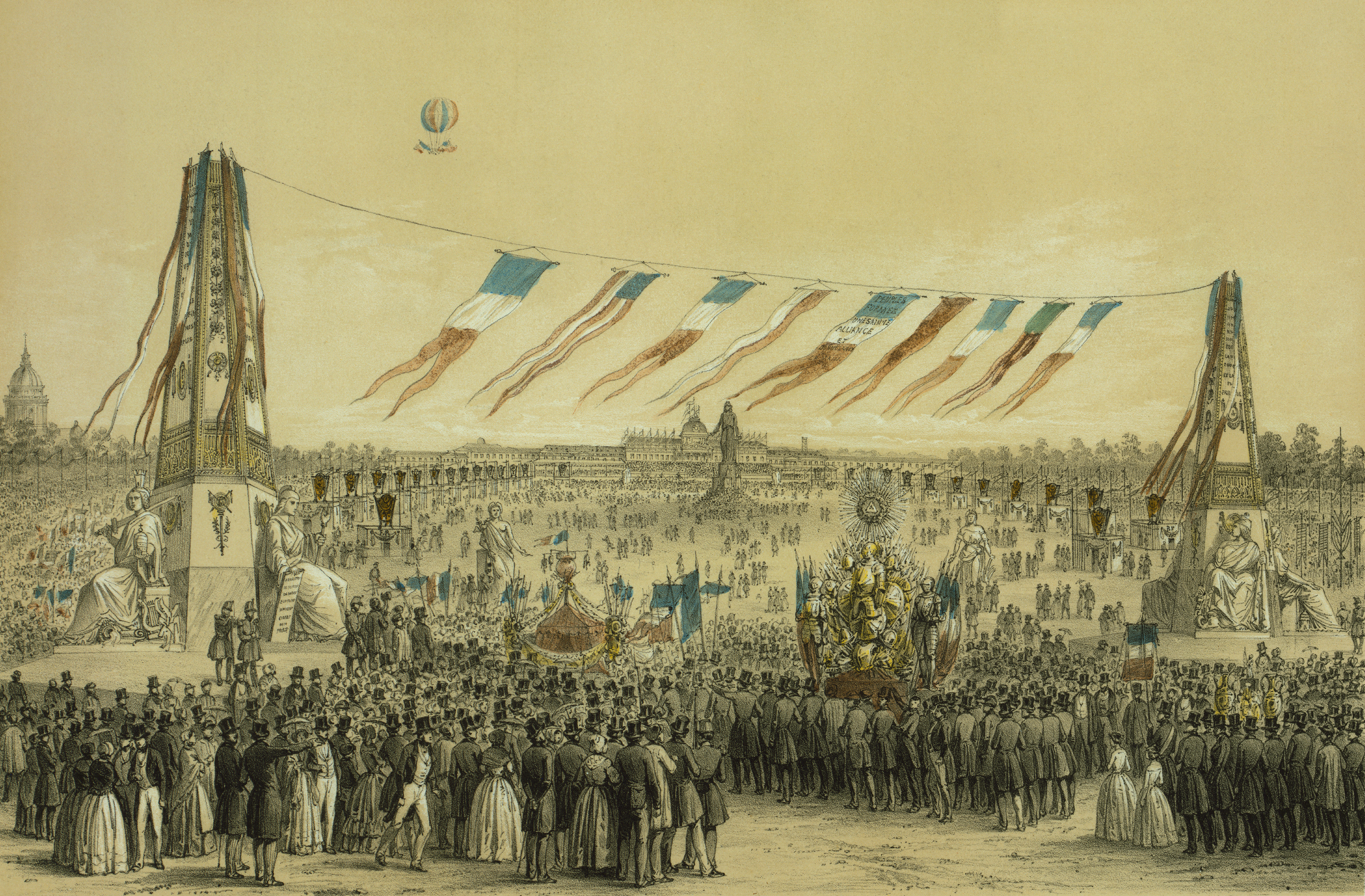
Fête de la Concorde, arrivée des corporations au Champ-de-Mars, by Jules Gaildreau and Charles Fichot.

The Fête de la Concorde was a festival held at the Champ-de-Mars in Paris, France.

The architect Henri Labrouste and the painter Pierre-Victor Galland contributed to the decoration of the festival in 1848.
