= Champ de Mars =

Public park in Paris, France

Coordinates: 48°51′22″N 2°17′54″E

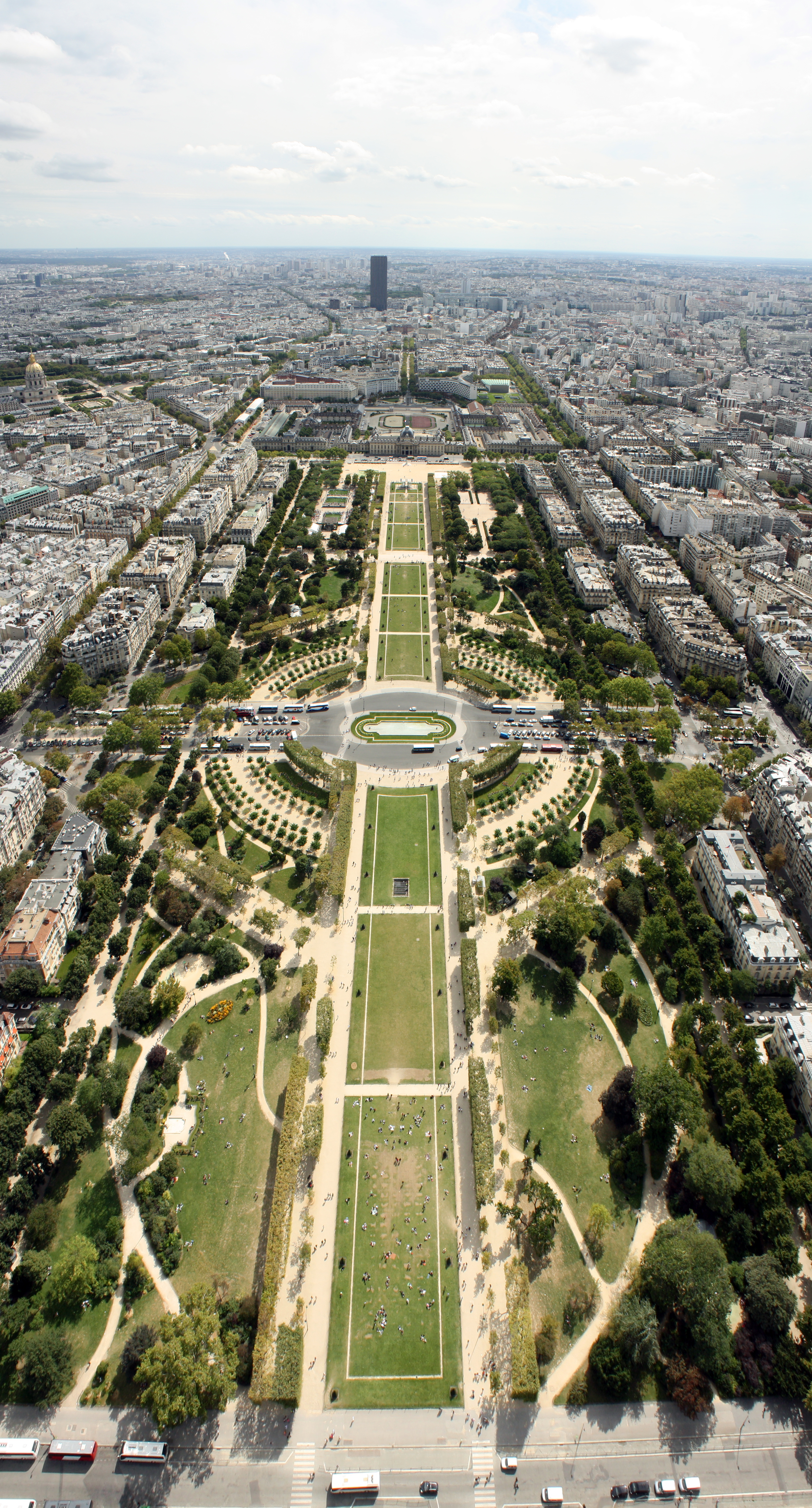
View southeast from the top level of the Eiffel Tower, down the Champ de Mars, with the Tour Montparnasse (Montparnasse Tower) in the distance. The École Militaire is one third down from the top of the picture.

The Champ de Mars (Note: French pronunciation: [ʃɑ̃ də maʁs]; lit. 'Field of Mars') is a large public greenspace in Paris, France, located in the seventh arrondissement, between the Eiffel Tower to the northwest and the École Militaire to the southeast. The park is named after the Campus Martius ("Mars Field") in Rome, which was dedicated to the god Mars. The name alludes to the fact that the lawns here were formerly used as drilling and marching grounds by the French military.

The nearest Métro stations are La Motte-Picquet–Grenelle, École Militaire, and Champ de Mars–Tour Eiffel, an RER suburban-commuter-railway station. A disused station, Champ de Mars, is also nearby.

== History ==
Originally, the Champ de Mars was part of a large flat open area called Grenelle, which was reserved for market gardening. Citizens would claim small plots and exploit them by growing fruits, vegetables, and flowers for the local market. However, the plain of Grenelle was not an especially fertile place for farming.

The construction, in 1765, of the École Militaire designed by Ange-Jacques Gabriel, was the first step toward the Champ de Mars in its present form. Grounds for military drills were originally planned for an area south of the school, the current location of the place de Fontenoy. The choice to build an esplanade to the north of the school led to the erection of the noble facade which today encloses the Champ de Mars. The planners leveled the ground, surrounded it with a large ditch and a long avenue of elms, and, as a final touch, the esplanade was enclosed by a fine grille-work fence.

The Isle of Swans, formerly a riverine islet at the location of the northeastern foot of the Eiffel Tower, was, for the sake of symmetry and pleasing perspectives, attached to the shore. (The Isle of Swans discussed here should not be confused with the Isle of Swans that sits in the middle of the Seine downstream and around the next bend in the river, between the fifteenth and sixteenth arrondissements.)

Jacques Charles and the Robert brothers launched the world's first hydrogen-filled balloon from the Champ-de-Mars on 27 August 1783.

This place witnessed the spectacle and pageantry of some of the best-remembered festivals of the French Revolution. On 14 July 1790 the first "Federation Day" celebration (fête de la Fédération), now known as Bastille Day, was held on the Champ de Mars, exactly one year after the storming of the prison. The following year, on 17 July 1791, the massacre on the Champ de Mars took place. Jean Sylvain Bailly, the first mayor of Paris, became a victim of his own revolution, and was guillotined there on 12 November 1793.

The Champ de Mars was also the site of the Festival of the Supreme Being on 8 June 1794. With a design by the painter Jacques-Louis David, a massive "Altar of the Nation" was built atop an artificial mountain and surmounted by a tree of liberty. The festival is regarded as the most successful of its type in the Revolution. During the Hundred Days a restored Napoleon held the Champ de Mai ceremony, during which he swore to uphold the Charter of 1815, at the Champ de Mars.

The Champ de Mars was the site of Expositions Universelles in 1867, 1878, 1889, 1900, and 1937.

== In art, culture, film and sport ==
Champ-de-Mars, Paris.

=== Art and culture ===
In 2012, the United Buddy Bears exhibit was held on the Champ de Mars, an international art exhibition with more than 140 two-meter-tall bears representing individual countries. They promote peace, love, tolerance and international understanding and are displayed across the planet. They stand at Champ de Mars in Paris, fronting the Eiffel Tower.

=== Use in film and television ===
Champ de Mars was used as a filming location in the 1985 James Bond film A View to a Kill, in which Bond (played for the last time by Roger Moore) drove a Renault 11 taxi which he had hijacked at the Eiffel Tower in pursuit of a mysterious assassin, later revealed to be May Day (Grace Jones).

=== Sports ===
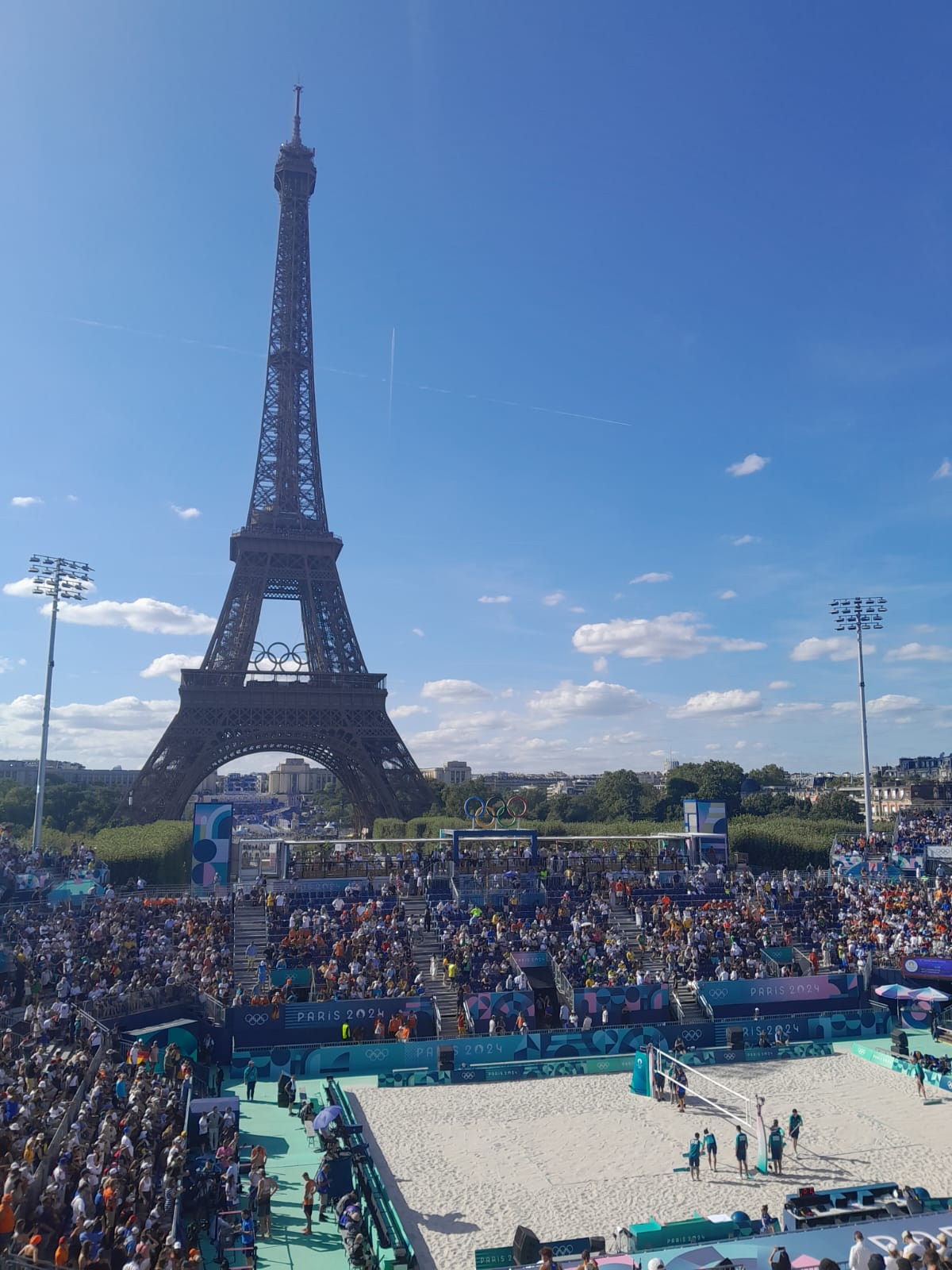
View of the Eiffel Tower from the Eiffel Tower Stadium during the 2024 Olympics.

Champ de Mars contains both a basketball court and a football field. For the 2024 Summer Olympics and Paralympics, a temporary stadium known as the Eiffel Tower Stadium (French: Stade de la Tour Eiffel) was erected atop the Place Jacques-Rueff, and hosted the beach volleyball and blind football tournaments at the games. The Grand Palais Éphémère was built in 2021 at the south end of the Champ to host Olympic events and conventions displaced by the renovation of the Grand Palais. Portions of the opening ceremony were held at the Champ.

== Gallery ==
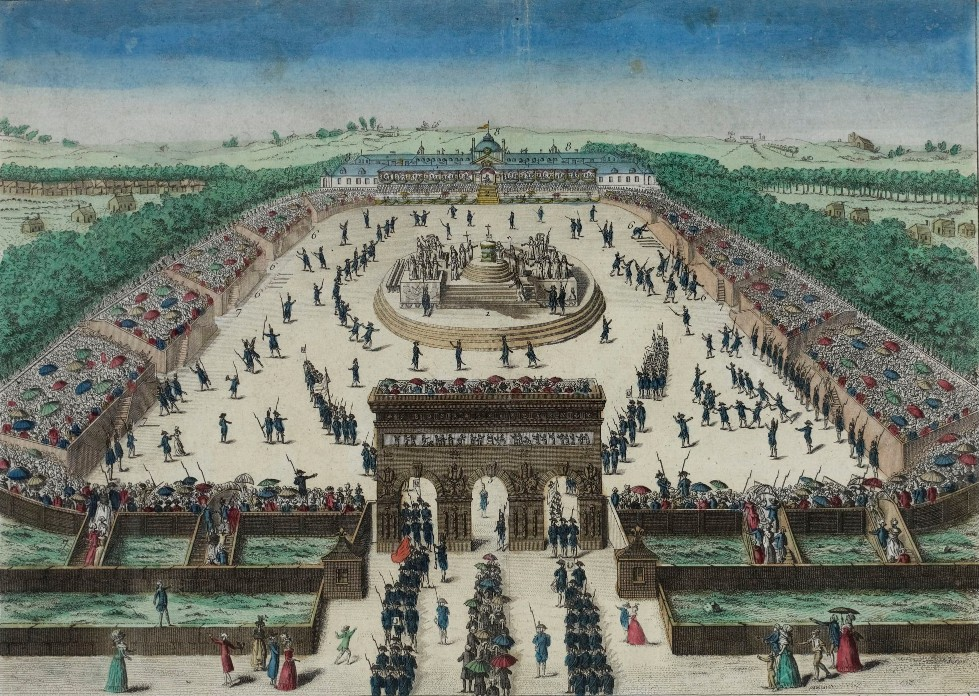
Illustration of the Fête de la Fédération at Champ de Mars, July 14, 1790 (Musée de la Révolution française).

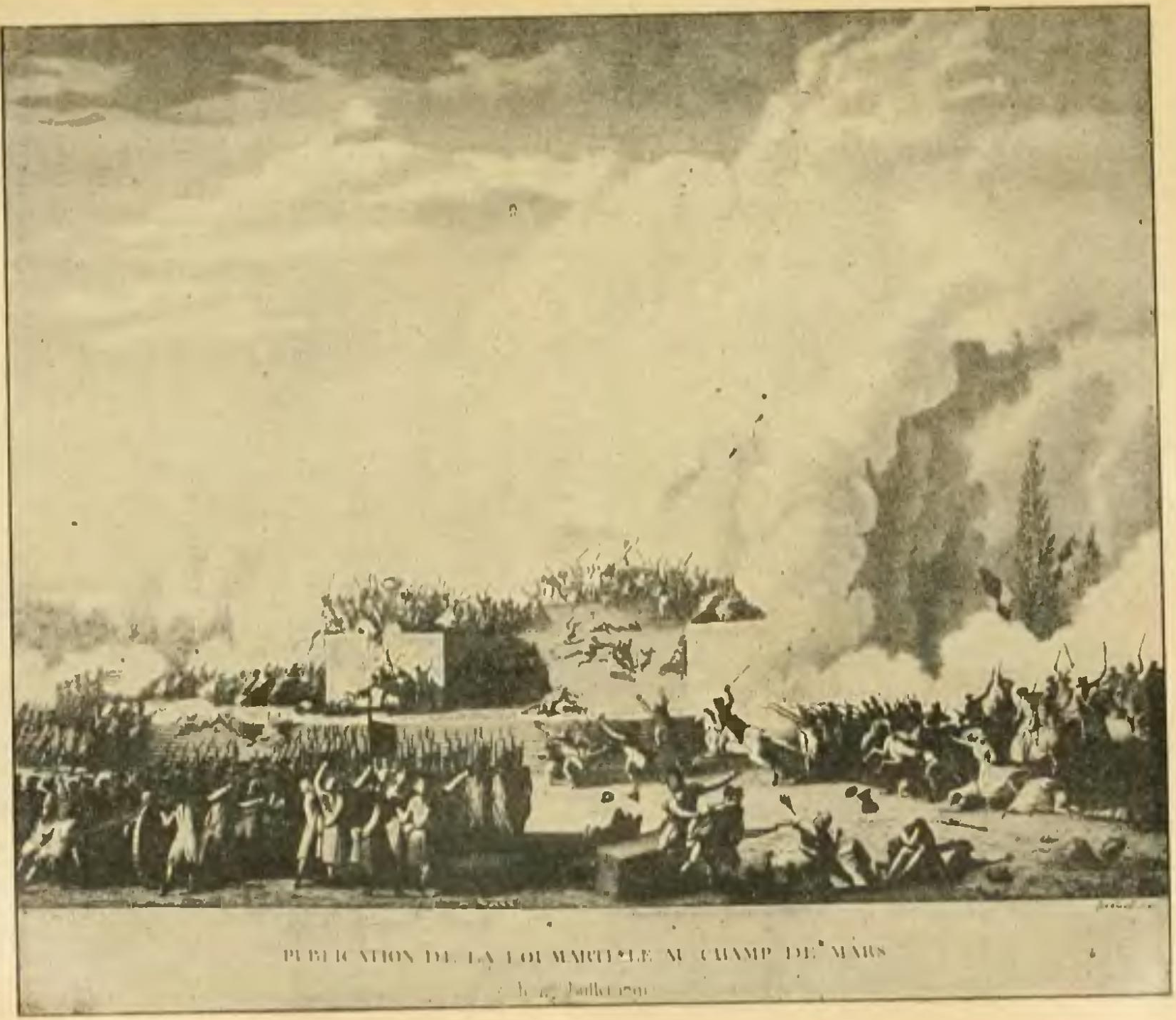
Illustration of massacre on the Champ-de-Mars, 1791.

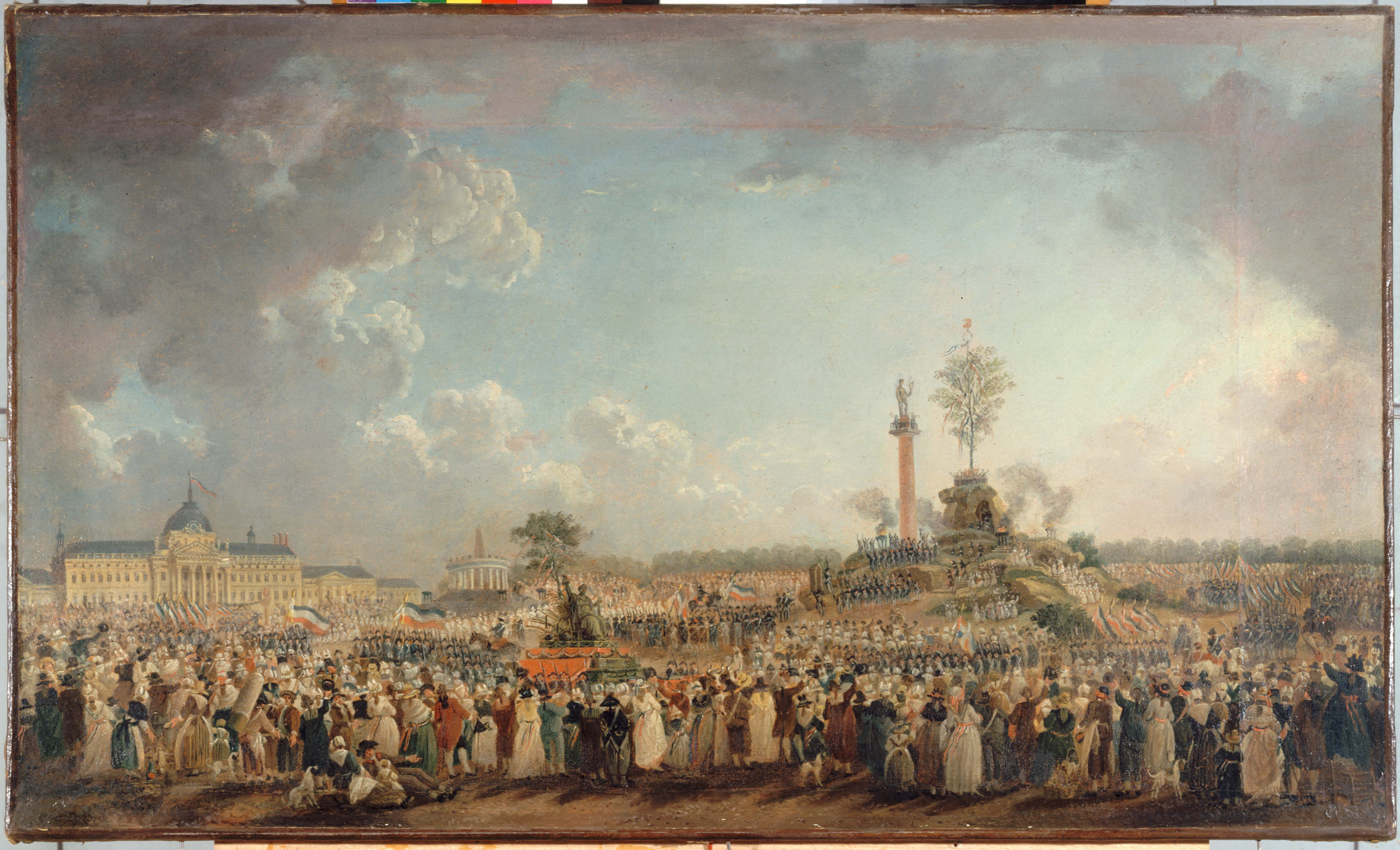
Painting of The Festival of the Supreme Being, June 8, 1794 (by Pierre-Antoine Demachy, 1794).

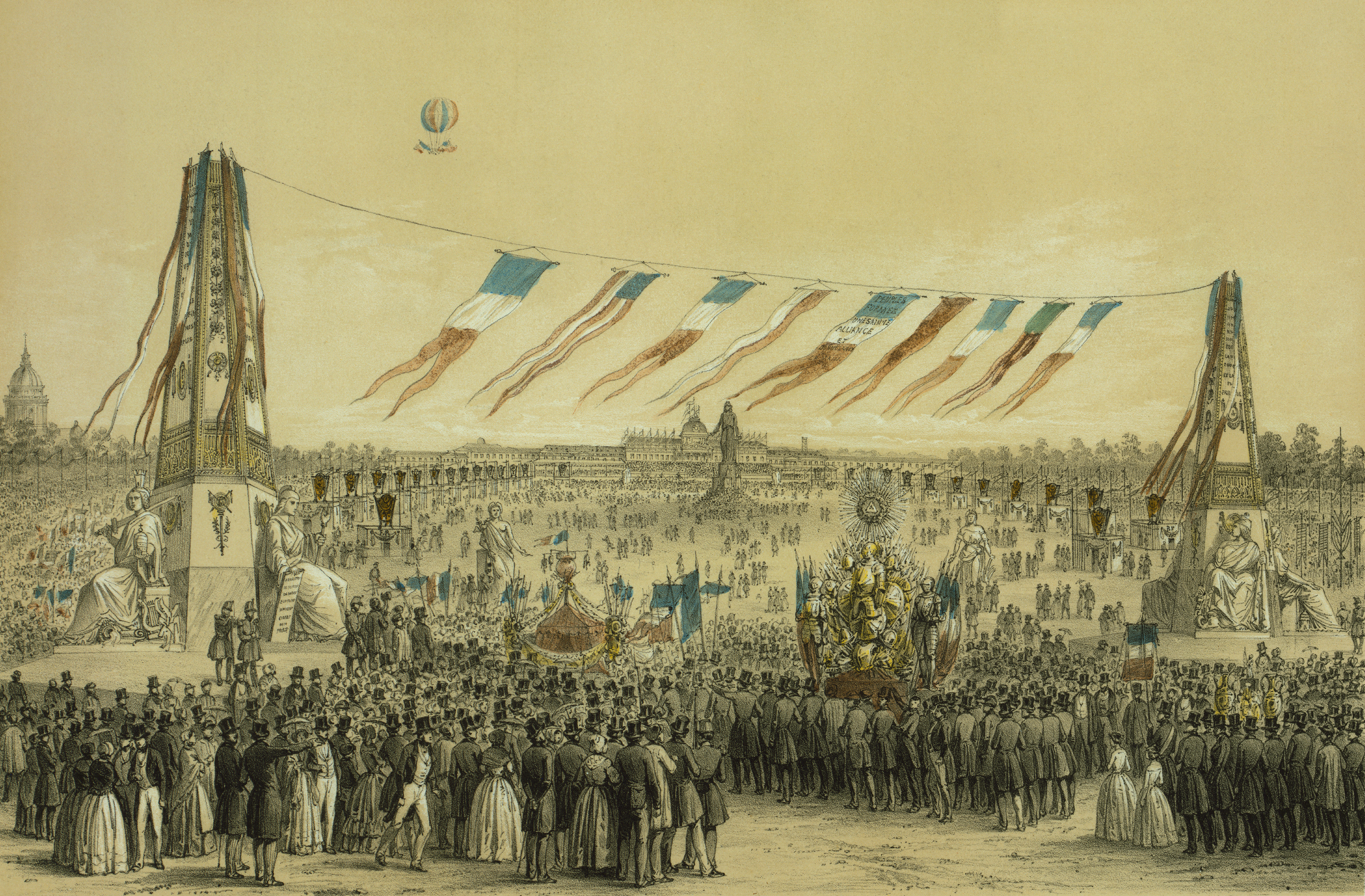
Illustration of Fête de la Concorde, May 21, 1848.

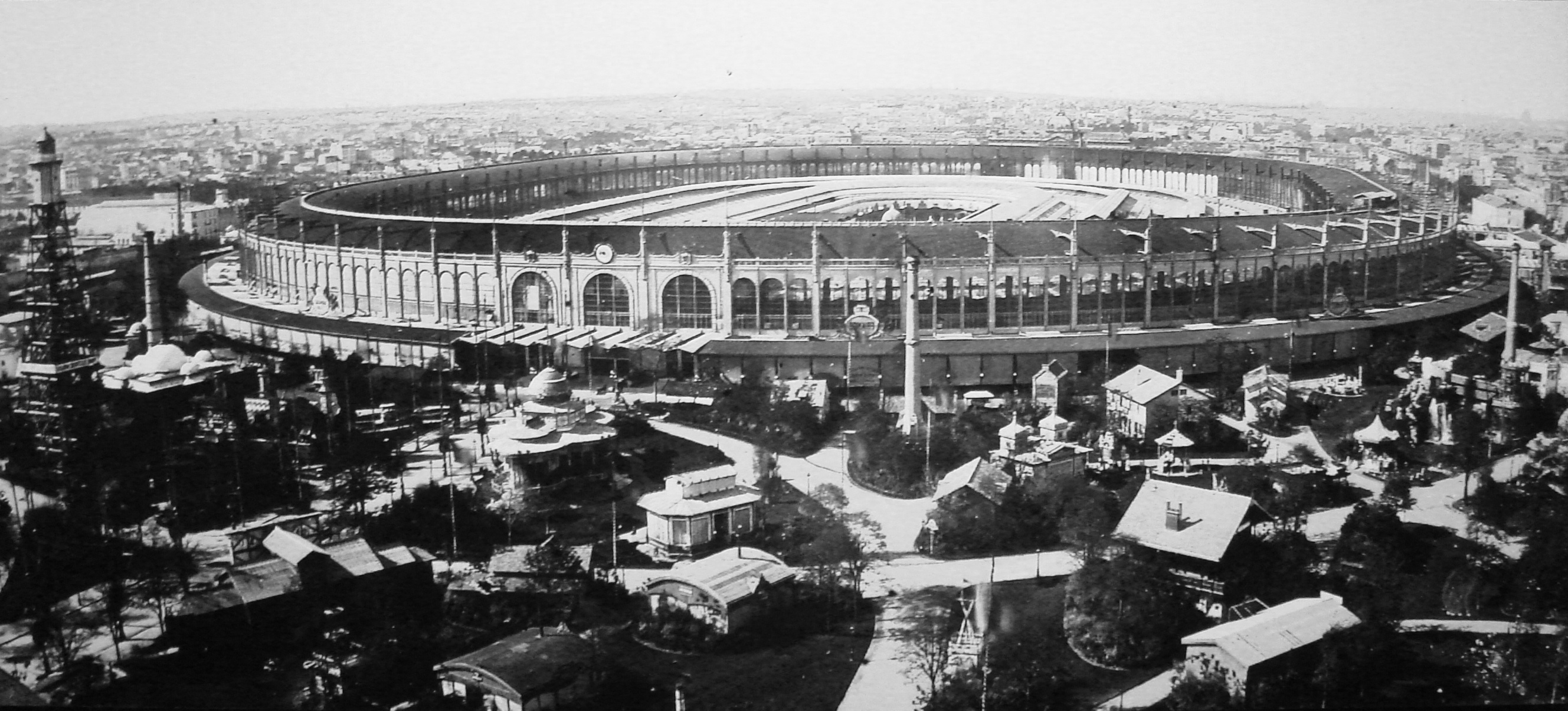
Photograph of Exposition Universelle, 1867.

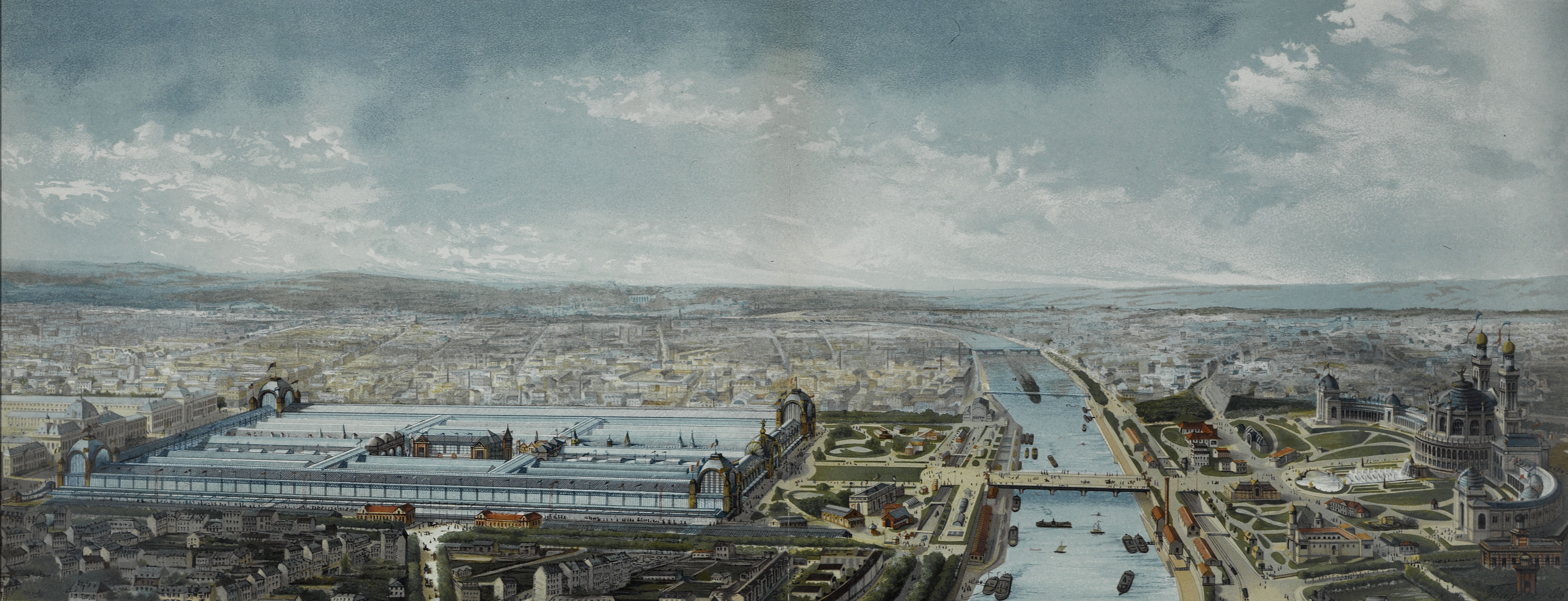
Panoramic view of Exposition Universelle, 1878.

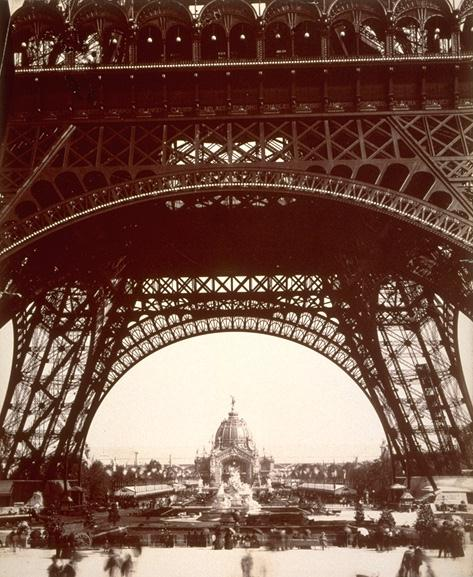
View of Exposition Universelle, 1889.

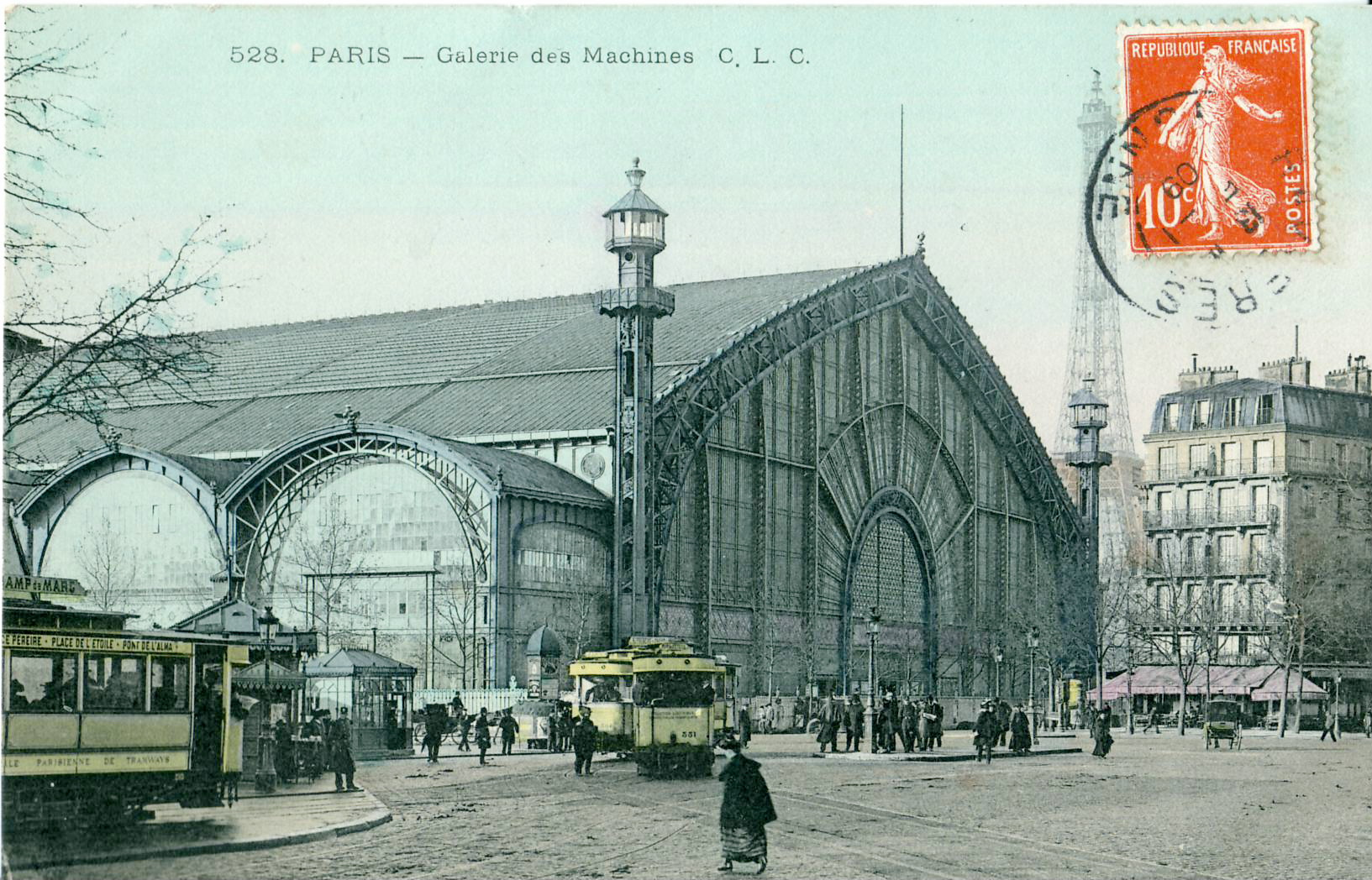
The Galerie des Machines (1889-1909) by Victor Contamin and Dutert.

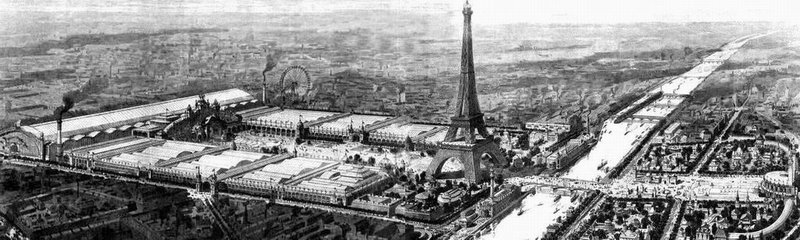
Illustration of Exposition Universelle, 1900.

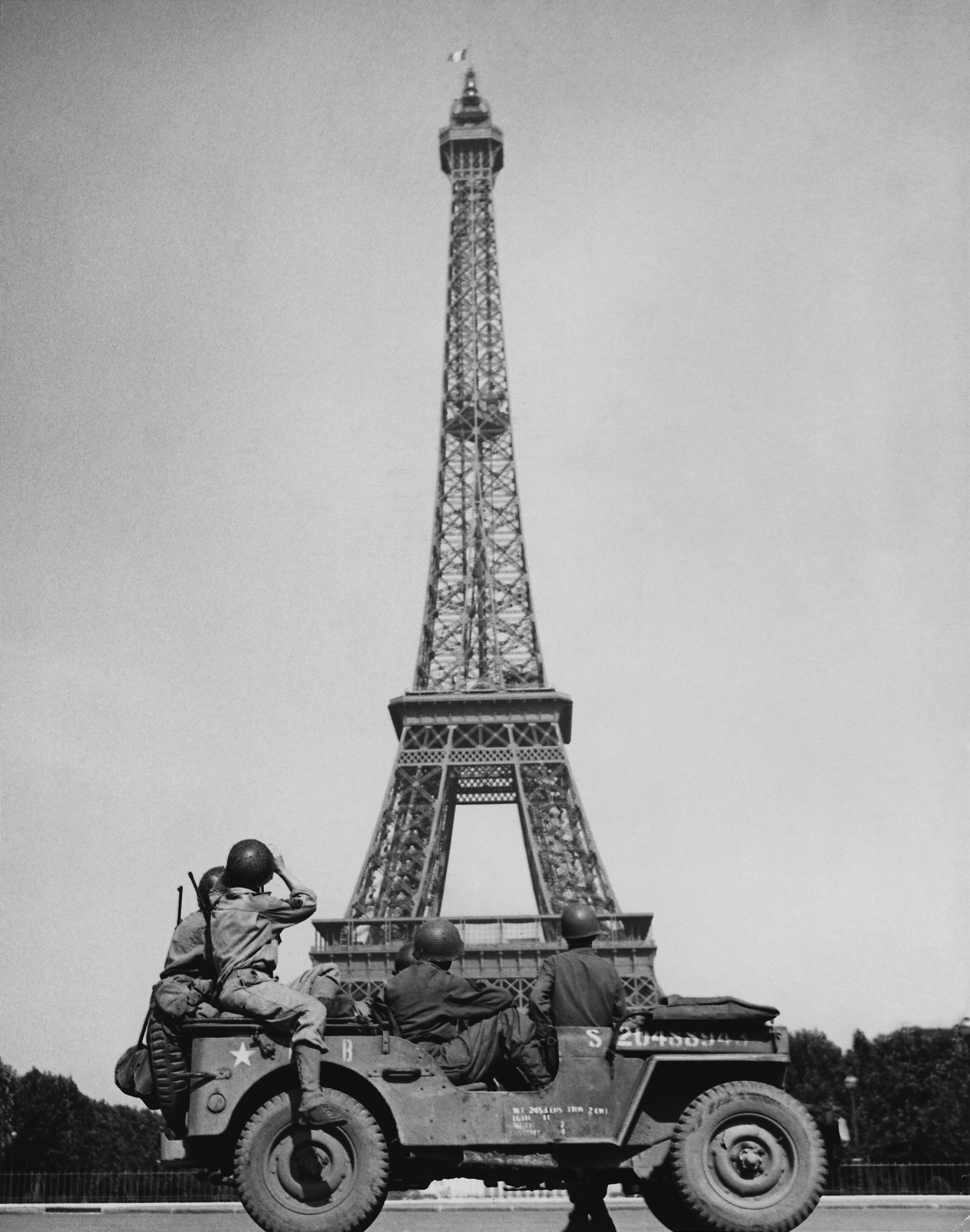
U.S. Army soldiers after liberation of Paris, 1944.

Champ de Mars in the 1970s.

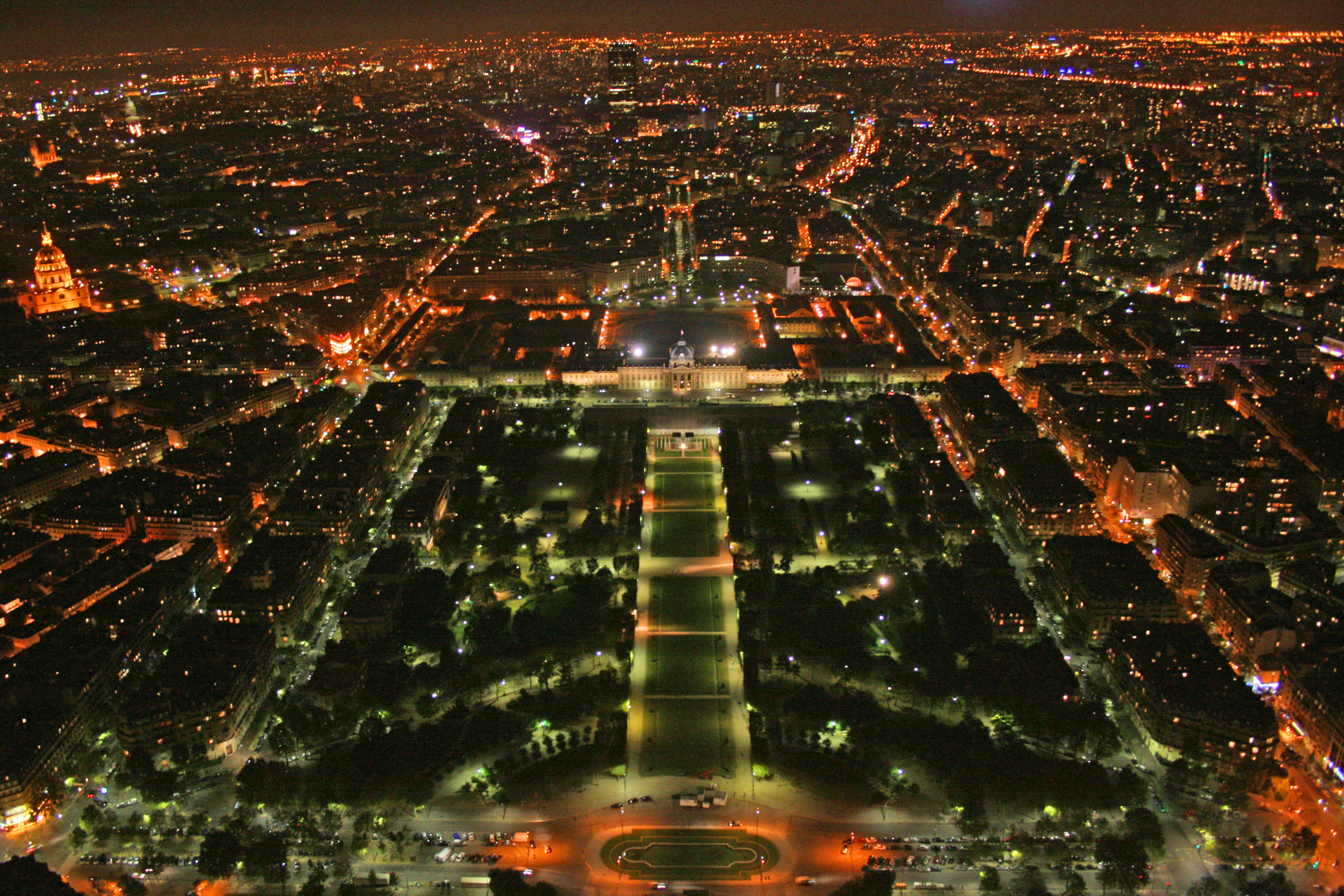
Champ de Mars at night (2007).

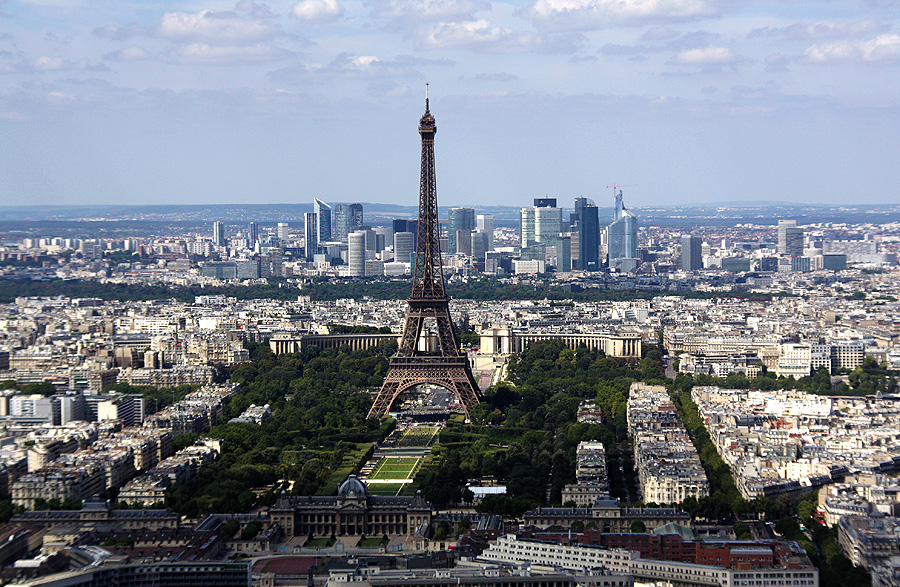
Champ de Mars – view from the Montparnasse Tower (2010).

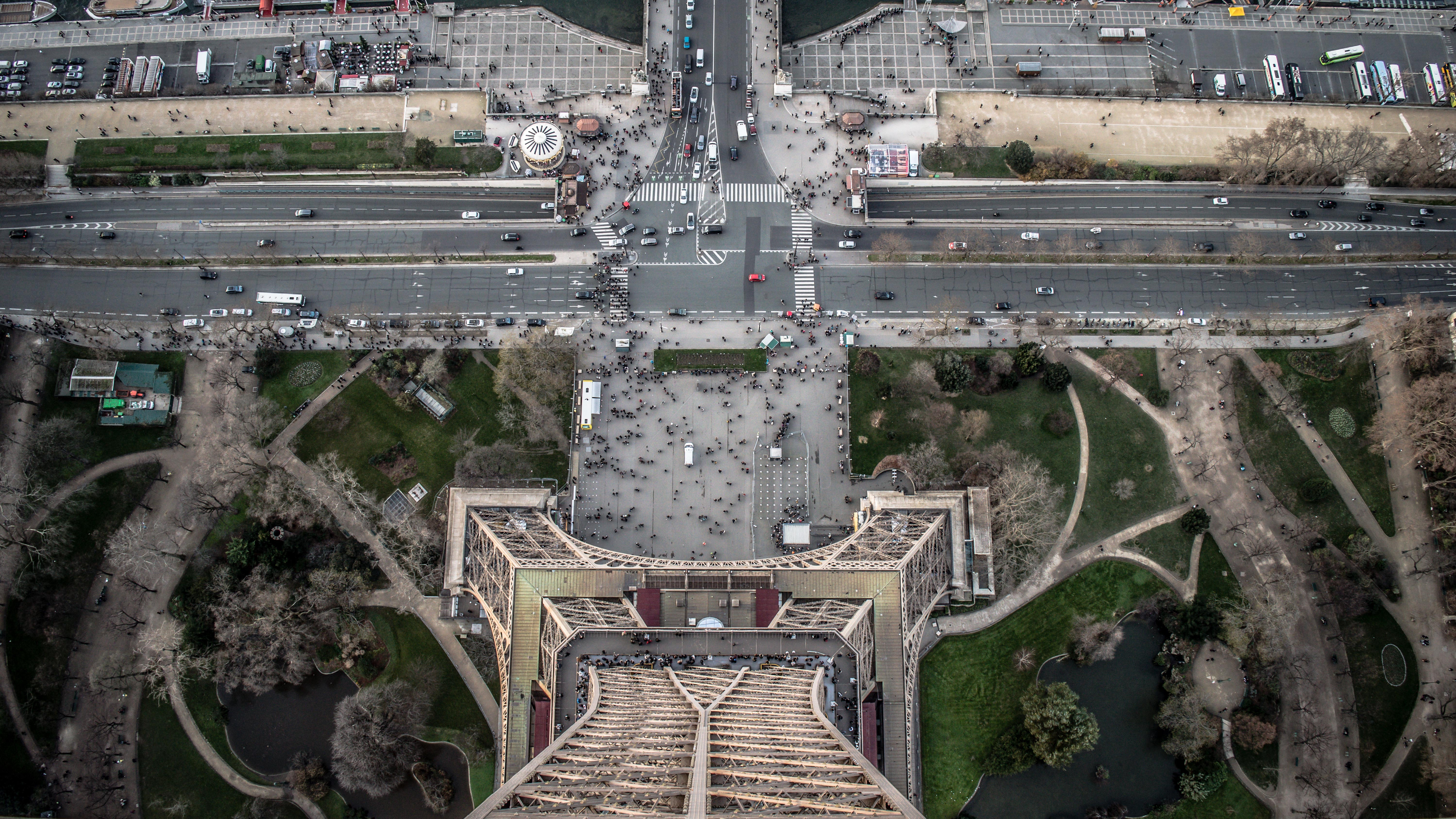
The north end of Champ de Mars and Quai Branly – As viewed from the Eiffel Tower (2016).

== See also ==
- List of world's fairs
- Champ de Mars (Montreal)
- Champ de Mars Massacre
- Fête de la Concorde
- Monument to the French Declaration of the Rights of Man and of the Citizen
