= Nicholas Mostyn =

British High Court judge (born 1957)

Sir Nicholas Mostyn

Justice of the High Court
- In office 20 April 2010 – 14 December 2023
- Nominated by: Jack Straw
- Appointed by: Elizabeth II
- Preceded by: Mr Justice Bennett

Personal details
- Born: Nicholas Anthony Joseph Ghislain Mostyn; 13 July 1957 (age 69) Lagos, Nigeria
- Education: Ampleforth College
- Alma mater: University of Bristol; Inns of Court School of Law

Sir Nicholas Anthony Joseph Ghislain Mostyn (born 13 July 1957) is a British retired High Court judge, who was assigned to the Family Division.

== Early life ==
The son of a British American Tobacco executive from North Wales, Mostyn was born in Nigeria, and grew up there and in Venezuela and El Salvador. After his parents divorced, he was educated at Ampleforth College alongside Edward Stourton where they won the Observer Mace debating prize. He then studied law at the University of Bristol.

== Career ==
Mostyn was called to the bar in 1980, initially undertaking beginner’s family work such as County Court domestic violence cases. He took silk in 1997. In 2000/01 he was on the losing side of the husband in the White v White case, where the judge ruled that "there should be no bias in favour of the money-earner and against the home-maker and the child-carer."

Mostyn was professionally successful in a number of notable cases including that of the wife of footballer Ray Parlour, and in the 1,000 day marriage case on behalf of the wife of a leading City of London fund manager where no children where involved. Some journalists used the nickname "Mr Payout." At the height of his earnings, he is said to have charged £500 an hour. He was retained by Fiona Shackleton in Paul McCartney's divorce case against Heather Mills. Like other barristers Mostyn undertook pro bono cases where he thought there was an important issue of law involved, such as issues arising from the functions of the Child Support Agency:

I think the performance of the CSA has been the greatest failure of public administration in the history of this country. The figures are simply mind-boggling. In its history, it has assessed about £8bn in child maintenance, and managed to collect about £4bn at a cost of £3bn. You might as well just pay them out of taxes. And the government's proposed reforms of the CSA are hopeless. The basis of the CSA is that child maintenance will be done by administrative assessment by a bureaucrat by reference to a formula – that was introduced in 1993. It did not work! They then had another act of Parliament to try and sort it out in 1995. It did not work! Labour came in, full of good intentions, 'We're going to sort this out, it's going to be brilliant'. Act of Parliament in 2000 – total failure! So if I was given a free bill in Parliament, it would be that. Abolish the CSA.

Mostyn became an assistant recorder in 1997, and both a recorder and a deputy High Court judge (in the Family Division) in 2000. He was appointed as a High Court judge on 20 April 2010, on the retirement of Mr Justice Bennett. He was knighted on 11 May 2010.

In 2015, Mostyn was removed from a case after he failed to follow a relevant ruling of the Supreme Court concerning rights of disabled people (namely that they have the same right to "physical liberty" as non-disabled people). This was the second such occurrence.

Mostyn's last sitting was 28 July 2023, and he officially retired on 14 December 2023.

== Personal life ==
Mostyn labels himself "Catholic, Welsh and Wagnerian", enjoys smoking, hunting, windsurfing and skiing; and follows Southampton F.C. and the England cricket team.

Mostyn has Parkinson's disease. Since March 2023 he has been one of the co-hosts of the podcast Movers and Shakers which is about renowned public figures and their life with Parkinson's. Recordings are made in a Notting Hill pub and the presenters (Mostyn, Rory Cellan-Jones, Gillian Lacey-Solymar, Mark Mardell, Paul Mayhew-Archer, and Jeremy Paxman) discuss "the highs and lows, trials and tribulations, of living with the condition". In March 2024 the UK Broadcasting Press Guild named Movers and Shakers its 'UK Podcast of the Year'.

== Notable cases ==
=== As counsel ===
- Karen v Ray Parlour: won more than £4m in 2004 in a divorce against the settlement former Arsenal F.C. footballer, where it was ruled that Karen's efforts to curb Parlour's addiction to the 'laddish' footballer drinking culture meant she had played an important role in his career. She was awarded a £250,000 lump sum, an annual personal maintenance allowance of £406,500, two tax-free homes, £37,000 maintenance for their three children, and 37.5% of his future earnings.
- Miller v Miller: City of London fund manager Alan, who was married to Melissa for less than 1000 days, was ordered to pay her £5m of his reported £65m fortune. No children were involved.
- Sandra v Sir Martin Sorrell: won the ex-wife of the CEO of advertising group WPP, a 40:60 share of marital in 2005, a sum of £29m after being "marginalised and dehumanised" by her husband during their 32-year marriage. The payout included a £23.4m lump sum, £2m in bank deposits, the family's £3.25m home, and two parking spaces valued at £200,000.
- Shan v Harry Lambert: in 2001, won £7.5M for the ex-wife of the newspaper proprietor. Harry Lambert who was represented by Martin Pointer QC. In 2002 after an appeal by Harry, the figure was increased by £2.6m, half Lambert's £20m fortune. Lambert described his ex-wife's contribution to their 23-year marriage as "revolving around children and the microwave," the judge quoted White v White back to him.
- Zeta v Francois Graff: won the model, socialite and actress £10m on divorcing diamond heir Francois in 2003. The settlement included a London property and a jewellery collection, from a family worth more than £100m. Mostyn described the settlement as a "crushing victory."
- Sir Paul McCartney v. Heather Mills: in which Mostyn was retained by McCartney's solicitor Fiona Shackleton, before Mills' solicitor Anthony Julius, leading to them being known during the case by the media as the "legal dream team."
- Charles Spencer, 9th Earl Spencer v second wife, Carolyn Freud: Mostyn represented the Earl. After losing the right to have the case heard in a closed court session, the Earl was upset at the final settlement. Mostyn, a keen farmer, named his latest batch of seven pigs after his thoughts on the case's high court judge, Mr Justice James Munby: James, Munby, Self-regarding, Pompous, Publicity, Seeking, Pillock. The Earl later unsuccessfully sued Mostyn.
- Katrin Radmacher v Nicolas Granatino: Mostyn represented Nicolas Granatino against millionairess, Katrin Radmacher. Mrs Radmacher was represented by Richard Todd QC. Mrs Radmacher was successful in effecting a change in the common law so that pre-nups were no longer void for public policy reasons.

=== As judge ===
- Re AA: Mostyn presided as judge and authorised an NHS Trust to deliver a child by emergency caesarian section, as the mother was judged to have lacked capacity to have consented to the operation herself. The mother was an Italian citizen who was visiting the UK; during her visit she suffered a severe psychological episode. The child was later the subject of a care application by Essex County Council.
- RF v Secretary of State for Work And Pensions [2017] EWHC 3375 (Admin) (21 December 2017): Mostyn ruled that the DWP had been engaging in practices that were "blatantly discriminatory against those with mental health impairments and which cannot be objectively justified. The wish to save nearly £1 billion a year at the expense of those with mental health impairments is not a reasonable foundation for passing this measure." Ministers had earlier rewritten the law in order to be able to ignore the outcome of a tribunal that resulted in similar conclusions. The DWP decided not to appeal after Mr Justice Mostyn's ruling.
