= John Smith Memorial Mace =

Intervarsity BP-debate tournament in the UK and Ireland

The John Smith Memorial Mace (known as the Observer Mace from 1954 to 1995) was an annual debating tournament (British Parliamentary format) contested by universities in England, Ireland, Scotland and Wales. Currently, the Scottish Mace is the only tournament to continue to run annually.

The equivalent competition for secondary schools is the ESU Schools Mace.

== History ==
The competition was founded in 1954 by the journalist Kenneth Harris of The Observer newspaper, and was sponsored by the newspaper until 1995. It was then renamed the John Smith Memorial Mace in honour of British Labour Party leader John Smith, who won the tournament as a member of the Glasgow University team in 1962, and died in 1994.

The competition has been held annually since 1954, except for 1977, when no tournament was organised. In the early years, neither Oxbridge debating societies (the Oxford Union nor the Cambridge Union) participated. Glasgow University Union has been the most successful institution in the competition's history, winning the tournament 16 times, most recently in 2018.

In addition to John Smith, other notable former winners include Charles Kennedy, Donald Dewar, John Nicolson, Lord Hunt of Wirral and Professor Anthony Clare.

== Format ==
Since 1993, the competition has been run by the English-Speaking Union, with assistance from regional convenors. Four regional tournaments are held each year for universities in England, Ireland, Scotland and Wales. The Irish tournament is open to teams from both the Republic of Ireland and Northern Ireland. The winners of these four regional competitions then go on to face each other in the International Final, which is held each spring to determine the overall champions.

No International Final has been held since 2019, when the English-Speaking Union removed its sponsorship of the competition. Only the Scottish Mace (which served as the regional qualifier and national championship for Scotland) has continued consistently, with the Irish Mace (which served as the regional qualifier and national championship for the Republic of Ireland and Northern Ireland) continuing in most years and the Welsh Mace (sometimes known as Welsh Nationals, which served as the regional qualifier and national championship for Wales) continuing in some years.

All debates in the competition are held using the British Parliamentary debate format. Speeches in the International Final and regional finals are seven minutes long, which is similar to most other British Parliamentary format tournaments, where speeches are usually seven or five minutes long. Until 2001, speeches in the tournament's finals were ten minutes long.

The Mace is considered by many debaters to be effectively an overall championship for the United Kingdom and Ireland, with the regional qualifying tournaments serving effectively as national championships for England, Scotland and Wales. The Irish Times National Debating Championship served as the Irish qualifier for the Mace in the 1960s, but is now run separately.

== Past champions ==
Year	Institution / Society	Speakers
2018	Glasgow University Union	Owen Mooney & Zannah Muir
2017	Oxford Union	Teck Wei Tan & Louis Collier
2016	University College Dublin	Aodhán Peelo & Clíodhna Ní Chéileachair
2015	Cambridge Union	Ashish Kumar & Michael Dunn Goekjian
2014	Cambridge Union	Kitty Parker Brooks & Ben Adams
2013	Trinity College Dublin Historical Society	Sally Rooney & Ian Curran
2012	University College Dublin Literary & Historical Society	Ciarán Garrett & Michael O'Dwyer
2011	Cambridge Union	Doug Cochran & Maria English
2010	University of Edinburgh	Paul Brown & Sebastian Osborn
2009	Oxford Union	Jonathan Leader Maynard & Alex Worsnip
2008	Lincoln's Inn	Usman Ahmed & Hannah Klein
2007	Cambridge Union	Sam Block & Adam Bott
2006	King's Inns	Barry Glynn & Mark Murphy
2005	Lincoln's Inn	Fiona Dewar & Sebastian Isaac
2004	Cambridge Union	Harriet Jones-Fenleigh & Nicholas Tan
2003	University College Cork Law Society	Stephen Coutts & Cian Murphy
2002	Lincoln's Inn	Dennis Kavanagh & George Payne
2001	University College Dublin Literary & Historical Society	Paul Brady & Colin Walsh
2000	Trinity College Dublin Philosophical Society	Bob Cuffe & Fergal Davis
1999	University of Edinburgh	Andrew Jessop & Richard Wilkins
1998	University of Edinburgh	Ben Foss & Colm O'Cinneide
1997	Trinity College Dublin Philosophical Society	Matthew Magee & Alex Massie
1996	University of Edinburgh	Bob Dalrymple & Stephen Magee
1995	Glasgow University Union	Manus Blessing & Duncan Hamilton
1994	Oxford Union	Rufus Black & Rod Clayton
1993	Gray's Inn	David Langwallner & Alan Maclean
1992	Glasgow University Union	Robin Marshall & Paul Sinclair
1991	Middle Temple	Jeremy Callman & Adam Deacock
1990	Glasgow University Union	Graeme Cleugh & Andrew Peterson
1989	Trinity College Dublin Historical Society	Anthony Whelan & Malachy McAllister
1988	University College Cork Philosophical Society	Adrian Hunt & Tim Murphy
1987	Glasgow University Union	Jardine Simpson & John Fletcher
1986	King's Inns	Dermot Horgan & Damien Crawford
1985	Glasgow University Union	Michael McKirdy & Angus Maciver
1984	University College Dublin Literary & Historical Society	Shane Murphy & Patrick Whyms
1983	Glasgow University Union	Michael Macfarlane & John Nicolson
1982	Glasgow University Union	Charles Kennedy & Clark McGinn
1981	Lincoln's Inn	Oliver Wise & Anthony Trace
1980	Middle Temple	Nicholas Mostyn & John Lyons
1979	University College Dublin Law Society	Donal O'Donnell & Conor Gearty
1978	University College Dublin Law Society	Donal O'Donnell & Conor Gearty
1977	No tournament	
1976	Inner Temple	Oliver Ross & Martin Russell
1975	Inner Temple	Ian Bullock & Edward Croff
1974	Glasgow University Union	Alistair Burrow & Martin MacLachlan
1973	Ealing College	Barrie Hawkins & Bob Meaton
1972	Glasgow University Union	Alan Gamble & Alistair Robertson
1971	Inner Temple	John M Aspinall & Dennis M Singham
1970	University College Cardiff	John Crook & Nick Jenkins
1969	Cambridge Union	Rajeev Dhavan & Nicholas Stadlen
1968	University of Strathclyde	James Hutchison & Victor MacColl
1967	Glasgow University Union	Colin MacKay & Matthew McQueen
1966	Trinity College Dublin Historical Society	David J McConnell & Cian Ó hÉigeartaigh
1965	University of Bristol	Bob Marshall-Andrews & David Hunt
1964	University College Dublin Literary & Historical Society	Anthony Clare & Patrick Cosgrave
1963	Glasgow University Union	Donald Dewar & Malcom MacKenzie
1962	Glasgow University Union	A Gordon Hunter & John Smith
1961	University of Edinburgh	Russell Johnston & David Harcus
1960	University College Cardiff	Vincent Kane & Mary O'Neill
1959	University College Dublin Literary & Historical Society	Godfrey Agbim & Owen Dudley Edwards
1958	Birkbeck College	Ernest C. Dalrymple-Alford & Fred Crawford
1957	Glasgow University Union	Ronald Anderson & James Gordon
1956	Glasgow University Union	Roger McCormick & J Scott Bernie
1955	Glasgow University Union	J Dickson Mabon & Andrew Kennedy
1954	Ruskin College	Tom Megahy & William McCarthy

== Most victories ==
Institution/Society	Victories
Glasgow University Union	16
Cambridge Union	6
University of Edinburgh	5
Lincoln's Inn	4
University College Dublin Literary & Historical Society	4
Inner Temple	3
Oxford Union	3
Trinity College Dublin Philosophical Society	2
Trinity College Dublin Historical Society	2
King's Inns	2
University College Dublin Law Society	2
Middle Temple	2
University College Cardiff	2
University College Cork Philosophical Society	1
University College Cork Law Society	1
Gray's Inn	1
University of Bristol	1
Ealing College	1
Birkbeck College	1
Ruskin College	1
University of Strathclyde	1

== Victories by country ==
Scotland	England	Ireland	Wales
21	21	14	2

== Winners of recent national qualifying tournaments ==
=== English Mace ===
Year	University	Speakers
2017–2018	Durham Union	Tim Sharpe & Rosie Vorri
2016–2017	Oxford Union	Teck Wei Tan & Louis Collier
2015–2016	Cambridge Union	Ruairidh Macintosh & John Papantoniou
2014–2015	Cambridge Union	Ashish Kumar & Michael Dunn Goekjian
2013–2014	Cambridge Union	Kitty Parker Brooks & Ben Adams
2012–2013	Kaplan Law School	Charlotte Thomas & Stuart Cribb
2011–2012	Oxford Union	Will Jones & Carin Hunt
2010–2011	Cambridge Union	Doug Cochran & Maria English
2009–2010	Cambridge Union	Doug Cochran & Uven Chong
2008–2009	Oxford Union	Jonathan Leader Maynard & Alex Worsnip
2007–2008	Lincoln's Inn	Usman Ahmed & Hannah Klein
2006–2007	Cambridge Union	Sam Block & Adam Bott
2005–2006	Cambridge Union	Nick Devlin & Alyson Thompson
2004–2005	Lincoln's Inn	Fiona Dewar & Sebastian Isaac
2003–2004	Cambridge Union	Harriet Jones-Fenleigh & Nicholas Tan
2002–2003	Cambridge Union	James Acton & Patrick Emerson
2001–2002	Lincoln's Inn	Dennis Kavanagh & George Payne

=== Irish Mace ===
Year	University	Speakers
2021–2022	Trinity College Dublin Historical Society	Caoimhinn Hamill & Jack Williams
2020–2021	University College Dublin Law Society	Caoilainn Carey & Alysia Cloake
2019–2020	N/A	N/A
2018–2019	Trinity College Dublin Philosophical Society	Ryan Grunwell & Harry Morris
2017–2018	Trinity College Dublin Historical Society	Daniel Gilligan & Rory O'Sullivan
2016–2017	Trinity College Dublin Philosophical Society	Sarah Jennings & Christopher Costigan
2015–2016	University College Dublin	Aodhán Peelo & Clíodhna Ní Chéileachair
2014–2015	Trinity College Dublin Philosophical Society	Gavin Tucker & Liam Hunt
2013–2014	Trinity College Dublin Philosophical Society	Rosalind Ní Shúilleabháin & Adam Noonan
2012–2013	Trinity College Dublin Historical Society	Sally Rooney & Ian Curran
2011–2012	University College Dublin Literary & Historical Society	Ciarán Garrett & Michael O'Dwyer
2010–2011	Trinity College Dublin Historical Society	Niamh Ní Mhaoileoin & Huw Duffy
2009–2010	Honorable Society of King's Inns	Eoghan Casey & Paddy Rooney
2008–2009	Trinity College Dublin Historical Society	Josephine Curry & Shane Farragher
2007–2008	University College Dublin Law Society	Marguerite Carter & Ross McGuire
2006–2007	University College Dublin Literary & Historical Society	Frank Kennedy & Noel McGrath
2005–2006	King's Inns	Barry Glynn & Mark Murphy
2004–2005	King's Inns	Leo Mulrooney & Rory Stains
2003–2004	University College Dublin Law Society	Sam Collins & David Whelan
2002–2003	University College Cork Law Society	Stephen Coutts & Cian Murphy
2001–2002	Trinity College Dublin Historical Society	Manus De Barra & Jim McElroy
2000–2001	University College Dublin Literary & Historical Society	Paul Brady & Ian Walsh
1999–2000	Trinity College Dublin Philosophical Society	Robert Cuffe & Fergal Davis
1998–1999	Trinity College Dublin Philosophical Society	Niall Boland & Colm O'Mongain
1997–1998	Trinity College Dublin Historical Society	Adrian Langan & Aoife Titley
1996–1997	King's Inns	Paul McDermott & Colm O'Cinneide
1995–1996	University College Galway Literary & Debating Society	Mary Cosgrove & Brian Hughes
1994–1995	University College Dublin Literary & Historical Society	Marcus Dowling & Dara Ó Briain
1993–1994	King's Inns	Kerida Naidoo & Newman
1992–1993	University College Dublin Literary & Historical Society	Michael Hodgins & Mark Rafferty
1991–1992	University College Dublin Literary & Historical Society	Michael Hodgins & Mark Rafferty

=== Scottish Mace ===
Year	University	Speakers
2025–2026	University of St Andrews	William Smith & Miya Turner
2024–2025	University of Edinburgh	Eli Ferrell & Cyrus Wrede-Braden
2023–2024	University of Edinburgh	Eli Ferrell & Alexandr Sušić
2022–2023	Glasgow University Union	Emma Walker & Joseph Hutchison
2021–2022	Glasgow University Union	Alexander Fraser & Emma Chan
2020–2021	Glasgow University Union	Julie Nyerges & Emma Chan
2019–2020	University of St Andrews	Ruth Batten & Malcolm Risk
2018–2019	Glasgow University Union	Harry Coloe & Robyn Lawrence
2017–2018	Glasgow University Union	Owen Mooney & Zannah Muir
2016–2017	University of Edinburgh	Ethan Silver & Dylan Desjardins
2015–2016	Glasgow University Union	Erin Kyle & Bethany Garry
2014–2015	University of St Andrews	Alex Don & Ruairidh Macintosh
2013–2014	University of Edinburgh	Shannon Turner and Andrew Beverstock
2012–2013	University of St Andrews	Ben Adams & Ruairidh Macintosh
2011–2012	Glasgow University Union	John McGee & Ross Mitchell
2010–2011	University of Edinburgh	Benjamin Lau & Marlena Valles
2009–2010	University of Edinburgh	Paul Brown & Sebastian Osborne
2008–2009	University of St Andrews	Daniel Berman & Thomas Cahn
2007–2008	University of St Andrews	Doug Cochran & Connie Grieve
2006–2007	Glasgow University Union	David Adams & Claire Brown
2005–2006	Glasgow University Union	David Adams & David Tait
2004–2005	Glasgow University Union	Kenny Fleming & Niall Kennedy
2003–2004	University of Edinburgh	Mark Dawson & Barney Ross
2002–2003	Glasgow University Union	Claire Brown & Nick Van Jonker
2001–2002	University of Edinburgh	Neill Harvey-Smith & Diana Tansley
2000–2001	University of Aberdeen	Duncan Cockburn & Rami Okasha
1999–2000	University of Aberdeen	Duncan Cockburn & Rami Okasha
1998–1999	University of Edinburgh	Andrew Jessop & Richard Wilkins
1997–1998	University of Edinburgh	Ben Foss & Colm O'Cinneide
1996–1997	Glasgow University Union	Chris Elliott & Alan Horn
1995–1996	University of Edinburgh	Bob Dalrymple & Stephen Magee
1994–1995	Glasgow University Union	Manus Blessing & Duncan Hamilton
1993–1994	University of Strathclyde	Jim Begley & Graham Keys
1992–1993	University of Strathclyde	Alison Brolls & Tommy Tonner

=== Welsh Mace ===
Year	University	Speakers
2022–2023	Aberystwyth University	Alexandra McCreadie & Dominic Ferris
2021–2022	Aberystwyth University	Alexandra McCreadie & Zach Godley-McAvoy
2020–2021	Cardiff University	Ebony Walker & Zach Menhinnitt
2019–2020	N/A	N/A
2018–2019	N/A	N/A
2017–2018	Swansea University	Hugh Kocan & Angus Rome
2016–2017	Swansea University	Samuel Harrison & Carl Rix
2015–2016	Swansea University	Bethan Nankivell & Tara Murphy
2014–2015	Aberystwyth University	Karolien Michiels-Keary & Ollie Newlan
2013–2014	Swansea University	Ieuan Skinner & Liam Dodd
2012–2013	Aberystwyth University	Roberto Sarrionandia & Ollie Newlan
2011–2012	Aberystwyth University	Michael Keary & Roberto Sarrionandia
2010–2011	Cardiff University	Victoria Jones & Kirsty Logan
2009–2010	Glamorgan University	Soloman Judd & Adam Jivraj
2008–2009	Cardiff University	Matthew Clarke & Craig Sutherland
2007–2008	Aberystwyth University	David Jones & Holly Tomlinson
2006–2007	Cardiff University	Matthew Clarke & Ben Lloyd
2005–2006	Cardiff University	David Steele & Lowri Rees
2004–2005	Cardiff University	Chantal Du Toit & Kate Kopajova
2003–2004	Cardiff University	Helen Jarman & Amy Thomas
2002–2003	Cardiff University	Helen Jarman & Amy Thomas
2001–2002	Swansea University	Bethan Thomas & Mike Scott

=== England & Wales Mace ===
Prior to the 2001–2002 academic year, England and Wales held a combined qualifying tournament for the International Final of the Mace. At the time, the winners of the Irish, Scottish and English/Welsh tournaments qualified for the International Final automatically, while runners-up from the events qualified for a repechage debate which determined the fourth team in the International Final. After the 2000–2001 academic year, England and Wales began holding separate qualifying tournaments and the repechage was abolished.

Year	University	Speakers
2000–2001	Cambridge Union	Kirsteen Macleod & Debbie Newman
1999–2000	University of London Union	Daragh Grant & James Probert
1998–1999	University of Leeds	Fergal Davis & Neill Harvey-Smith
1997–1998	Inner Temple	Jody Beveridge & John Madden
1996–1997	Gray's Inn	Jon Adkin & Neil Sheldon
1995–1996	City University	Jon Adkin & Jon Hough
1994–1995	Cambridge Union	Kelly Rees & Trevor Sather
1993–1994	Oxford Union	Rufus Black & Rod Clayton
1992–1993	Gray's Inn	David Langwallner & Alan Maclean

== See also ==
- English-Speaking Union
- ESU Schools Mace
