= Dartmouth House =

Building in London, England

Coordinates: 51.5079°N 0.1468°W

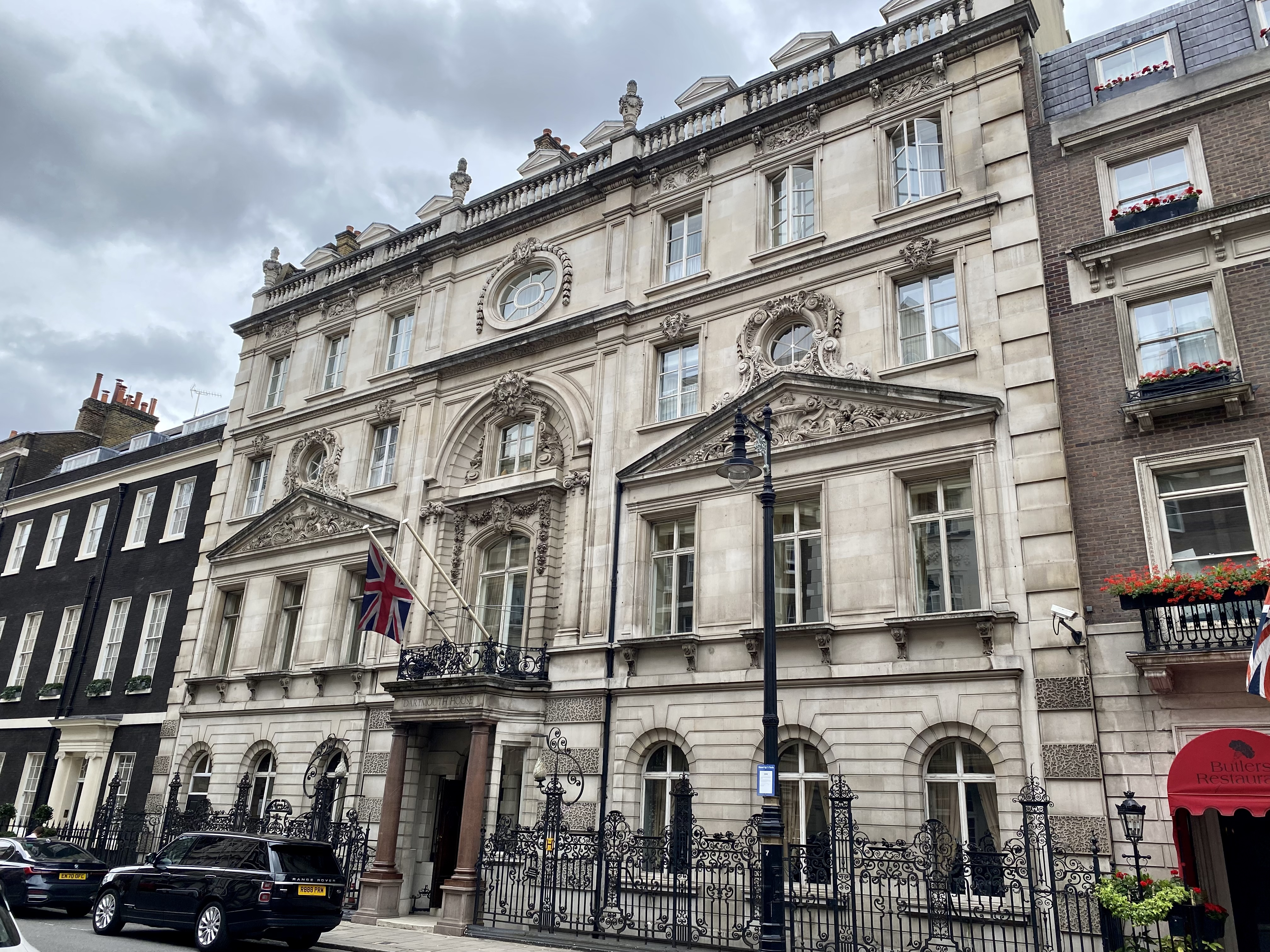

- Location within Greater London

General information
- Architectural style: Georgian
- Location: London, England, United Kingdom

Website
- dartmouthhouse.co.uk

Dartmouth House is a Georgian house in Mayfair, central London, England. It now serves as the headquarters of the English-Speaking Union (ESU), an educational charity. It is located at 37 Charles Street, southwest of Berkeley Square. Over 40,000 people use the building each year.

The original building was constructed in the mid 18th-century; what today comprises Dartmouth House was two separate residences, numbers 37 and 38 Charles Street. The first owner of number 37 was Henry Herbert, 2nd Earl of Carnarvon, from 1757 to 1776.

In 1870, the banker Edward Baring bought both properties and on his creation as Baron Revelstoke in 1885, he converted the two houses into one to house his collection of French antique furniture and art. He remodelled and refurbished the house in a French Rococo style. There is a painted ceiling by Pierre-Victor Galland above the grand staircase. However, a crisis at Baring Brothers and Co Bank meant that spending on the buildings was curtailed and all building and design work ceased. Many of Lord Revelstoke's furnishings and objets d’art had to be sold at auction, although he continued to live here until his death in 1897.

The next owner, William Legge, 6th Earl of Dartmouth, made the most significant changes to the interior of the house in 1900, with the creation of the Long and Small Drawing Rooms. The house was used as the Dartmouth family home until the outbreak of war in 1914, when it was used by the British Red Cross as a military hospital. It was sold again in 1918 to the Hon. Mrs Robert Lindsay.

Dartmouth House was purchased by the English-Speaking Union in 1926 for the sum of £45,000 from the Hon. Mrs Robert Lindsay. It was formally opened as the London Headquarters of the ESU by the Prime Minister, Sir Stanley Baldwin, on the 22 February 1927.

Dartmouth House has been listed Grade II* on the National Heritage List for England since December 1987.
