= ESU Schools Mace =

Debating tournament in the UK and Ireland

The English-Speaking Union Schools' Mace is an annual debating tournament for secondary schools in England, Ireland, Scotland and Wales.

The competition was founded in 1957 by the journalist Kenneth Harris of The Observer newspaper, and was initially known as The Observer Schools' Mace. Since 1995, the tournament has been organised by the English-Speaking Union, with assistance from several regional convenors.

Schools across the United Kingdom and Ireland are eligible to enter one team in the championships each year, made up of three student debaters from the school. Teams compete in multiple rounds before regional finals, the winners from each of the twelve regions going on to the national final day. Final day is made up of two rounds: the semi-finals, in which the regional champions are split into two groups of six, with the winning team of each group moving on to the last round, and the grand final, the winner of which is crowned national champion, receiving medals and a trophy, as well as having their names put on the Silver Mace the competition is named for.

The equivalent competition for universities in the UK and Ireland is the John Smith Memorial Mace.

== Past champions ==
2025	Radley College, Oxford
2024	Radley College, Oxford
2023	St Paul's Girls' School, London
2022	Tonbridge Grammar School, Kent
2021	Wellington College, Berkshire
2020	None (Cancelled due to COVID-19)
2019	Saint Francis Xavier's College, Liverpool
2018	George Watson's College, Edinburgh
2017	St Francis College Rochestown, Cork
2016	Loreto College, St Stephen's Green, Dublin
2015	St Columba's School, Kilmacolm
2014	George Heriot's School, Edinburgh
2013	Dulwich College, London
2012	Eton College, Berkshire
2011	St Paul's School, London
2010	Haberdashers' Aske's Boys' School, Hertfordshire
2009	St Paul's School, London
2008	Dalriada School, County Antrim
2007	Grove Academy, Dundee
2006	City of London School
2005	St Bonaventure's RC School, London
2004	George Heriot's School, Edinburgh
2003	The Bishop's Stortford High School, Hertfordshire
2002	Haberdashers' Aske's Boys' School, Hertfordshire
2001	George Heriot's School, Edinburgh
2000	Sandford Park High School, Dublin
1999	High School of Glasgow
1998	High School of Glasgow
1997	Coláiste an Spioraid Naoimh, Cork
1996	Westminster School, London
1995	George Heriot's School, Edinburgh
1994	Harrogate Grammar School
1993	Durham Johnston Comprehensive School
1992	Aylesbury Grammar School
1991	Watford Grammar School for Boys
1990	Solihull Sixth Form College
1989	Westminster School, London
1988	Ripon Grammar School
1987	Lancing College, West Sussex
1986	Lowlands Sixth Form College, Harrow
1985	Liverpool College
1984	St George's College, Weybridge
1983	Solihull Sixth Form College
1982	Winchester College
1981	Hereford Cathedral School
1980	Haberdashers' Aske's Boys' School, Herts
1979	Sutton High School for Girls
1978	City of London School
1977	Haberdashers' Aske's Boys' School, Herts
1976	Marlborough College, Wilts
1975	Ampleforth College, North Yorks
1974	Tynemouth College, North Tyneside
1973	Tudor Grange Grammar School, Solihull
1972	Hereford Cathedral School
1971	Queen Elizabeth's School for Girls, Barnet
1970	Convent of the Holy Child, Blackpool
1969	Hampton Grammar School, Middlesex
1968	Bromsgrove School, Worcs
1967	St Lawrence College, Kent
1966	King Edward VI Camp Hill School for Girls, Birmingham
1965	Eton College, Windsor
1964	Eton College, Windsor
1963	Ampleforth College, North Yorks
1962	Dulwich College, London
1961	Felsted School, Essex
1960	Christ's Hospital, West Sussex
1959	City of Bath Boys' School
1957	Felsted School, Essex

== See also ==
- John Smith Memorial Mace (universities competition)
- English-Speaking Union
