= Frantz Jourdain =

French-Belgian architect (1847-1935)

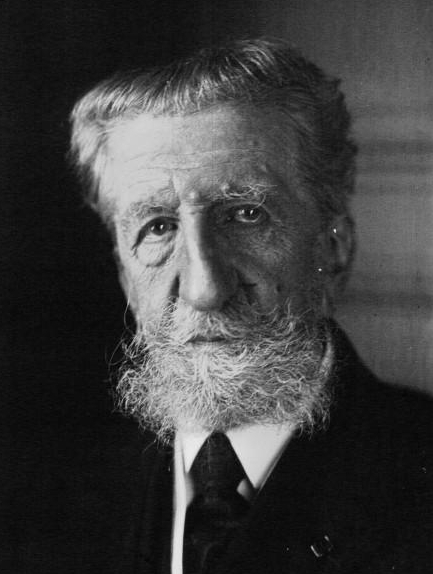
- Jourdain in 1923
- Born: 3 October 1847; Antwerp, Belgium
- Died: 22 August 1935 (aged 87); Paris, Ile-de-France, France
- Occupation: Architect
- Children: Francis

Frantz Jourdain (French pronunciation: [fʁɑ̃ts ʒuʁdɛ̃]; 3 October 1847 – 22 August 1935) was a Belgian architect and author. He is best known for La Samaritaine, an Art Nouveau department store built in the 1st arrondissement of Paris in three stages between 1904 and 1928. He was respected as an authority on Art Nouveau.

== Life ==
Frantz Jourdain was born in 1847. In the 1860s, he studied in Paris at the École des Beaux-Arts. He obtained French citizenship in 1870.

=== Critic ===
Jourdain was a theoretician of Art Nouveau. He began writing on the arts in 1875, and by the end of his life had published about two hundred articles in sixty magazines and newspapers, at first news items but later critical articles in which he expressed his thoughts on art. Some of these were gathered into collections in 1886 and 1931. His writings were eclectic. Apart from writing on artistic questions he published a picaresque romance, two collections of short stories, a novel, a play and two collections of portraits of artists.

Between 1880 and 1910, Jourdain was at the forefront of the movement to renew and synthesize the arts, and played an important role in introducing new ideas. He discovered unknown painters of the late 19th century and was a great admirer of the Galerie des machines of the Exposition Universelle (1889), designed by Ferdinand Dutert and Victor Contamin. In 1887, he was admitted to the Société des gens de lettres. He had become a prominent and often quoted art critic by the 1890s, an opponent of academic training and of the English Arts and Crafts movement. He was hostile to institutions such as the Beaux-Arts, which stifled new talent, and thought the Prix de Rome which sent artists to the Villa Medici to study the well-known antiquities was a waste of time.

=== Architect ===
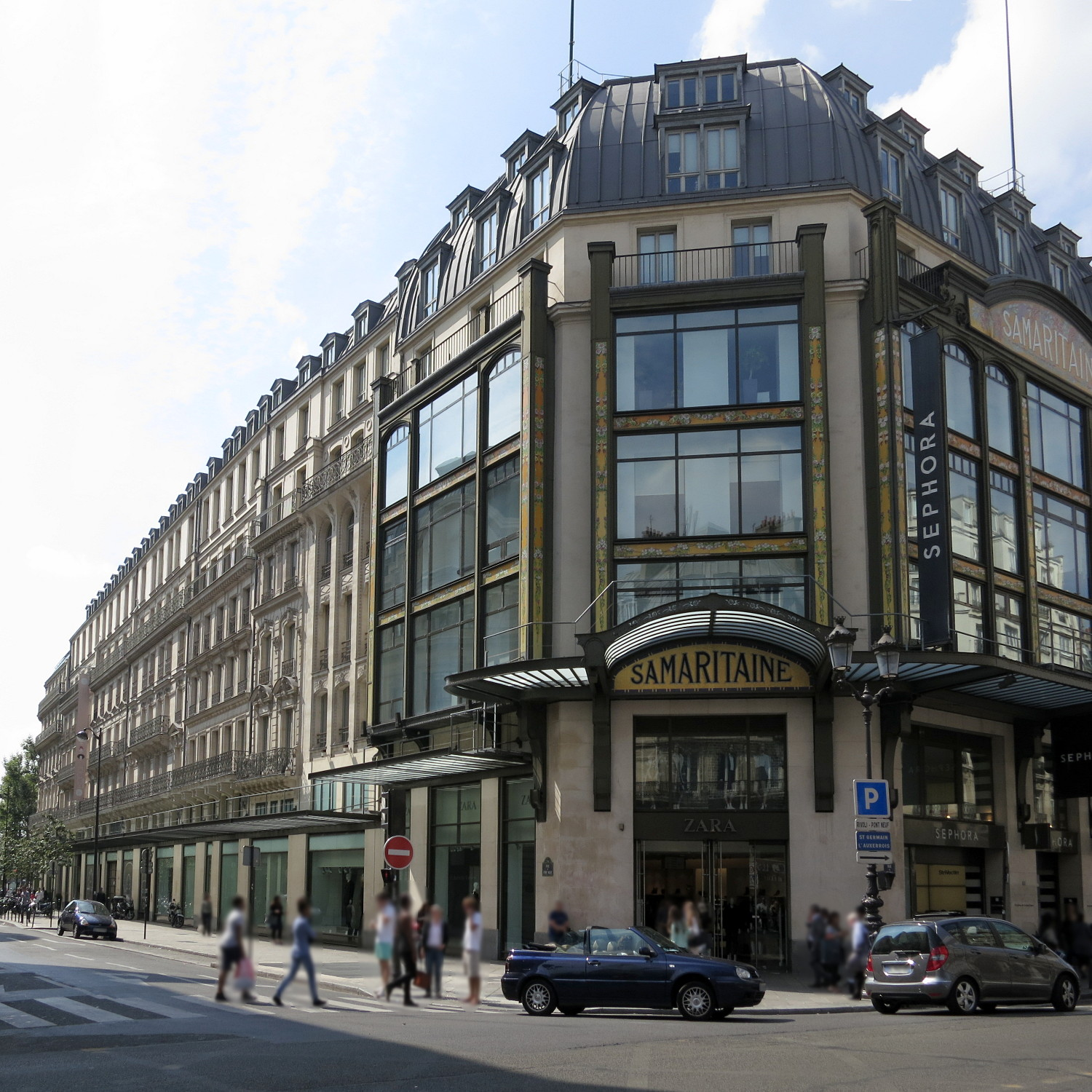
La Samaritaine Magazin 1

La Samaritaine, a department store, was founded by Ernest Cognacq in 1870 when he leased a small part of a building for commercial use. He then bought the building, and in stages bought the building that faces it on the rue de la Monnaie. In 1885, he engaged Jourdain to redesign the original building, and at the same time began to improve the exterior of the building. In 1904, Cognacq decided to expand the store. Jourdain was given the job of creating the maximum amount of space as quickly and cheaply as possible, and designed a radical steel structure. The flamboyant exterior decoration was executed by his son, the decorator Francis Jourdain, the painter Eugène Grasset, the metalworker Edouard Schenck and the ceramist Alexandre Bigot. His use of glass and an exposed steel frame in this design was both radical and functional, although soon after completion it drew criticism from a new generation of architects that rejected Art Nouveau.

His work was part of the architecture event in the art competitions at the 1912 Summer Olympics.

La Semeuse de Paris was built between 1910 and 1912 to house the credit department of La Samaritaine department stores for lending to the poorest customers. The art nouveau building also contained apartments. It was listed as a historical monument on 11 December 2000. In 1925, Cognacq was authorized to construct a second building. Jourdain and Henri Sauvage began work in January 1926, and completed it in September 1928 after many changes from the original plan. At the request of the prefecture the steel frame was given a cream-colored stone exterior. Jourdain built Store 3 on the lot bounded by the rues de Rivoli, Pont-Neuf and Boucher between 1930 and 1933. The interior is best preserved in Store 2, with a glass roof, wide staircases and characteristic bright blue, green and orange colors.

=== Later years ===
Jourdain became president of the Salon d'Automne in 1903. He was a founding member of the Société du Nouveau Paris, a group that promoted modernization of Paris. Frantz Jourdain died in 1935. His son Francis Jourdain was a designer, writer, and painter. Francis Jourdain said of the society in which he grew up that it was dominated by people who were highly opinionated and quick to take sides. Although its members pretended to be in favor of liberty and compassion, he saw it as tainted by prejudices, xenophobia and extreme emotion. His father was very much typical of this society.

== Buildings ==
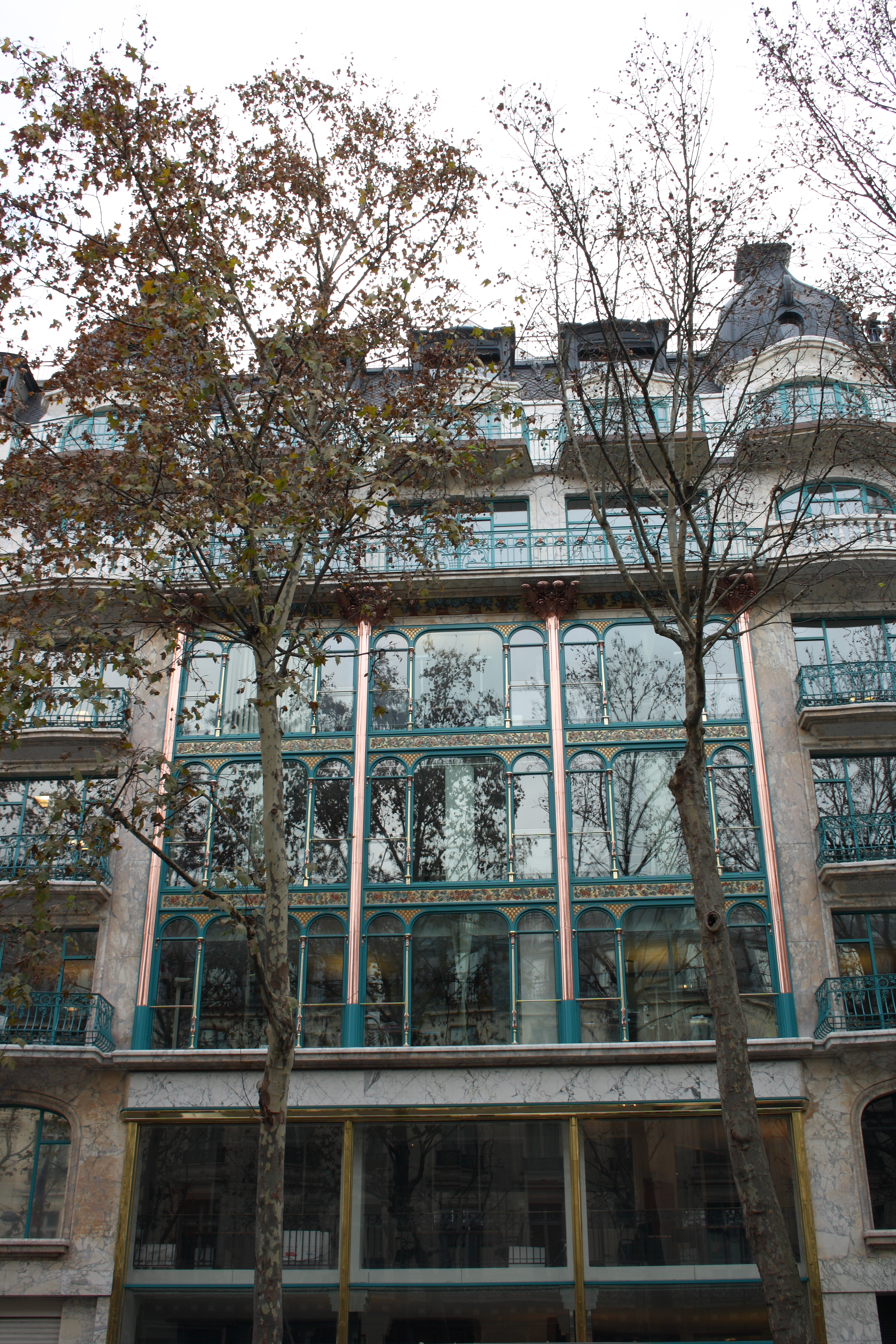
Samaritaine de Luxe

- 1876 Restoration of the castle of La Roche-Guyon, Val-d'Oise
- 1878 Chapel of the Dida family in Draveil, Essonne
- c. 1887 Villa in Chelles, Seine-et-Marne
- 1887 Seven-story tenement, 9 rue Galilée – rue Hamelin, 16th arrondissement of Paris, with Henri Fivaz
- 1888 Factory in Pantin, Seine-Saint-Denis
- 1893 Restoration of the Château de Verteuil, Charente
- 1893 Imprimerie Nouvelle, 9–11 rue Cadet, 9th arrondissement of Paris
- 1894 Town house of the iron dealer Schenck, 9 rue Vergniaud, 13th arrondissement of Paris
- 1898 Grave of Alphonse Daudet in Père Lachaise Cemetery, Paris, in collaboration with the sculptor Alexandre Falguière
- 1899 Expansion of the department store La Samaritaine to two floors, 75 rue de Rivoli, 1st arrondissement of Paris
- 1902 Grave of Émile Zola in Montmartre Cemetery, Paris
- 1905–07 Reconstruction of La Samaritaine, rue Baillet – rue de l'Arbre Sec – rue de la Monnaie, 1st arrondissement of Paris
- 1910–12 La Semeuse de Paris, 16 rue du Louvre, 1st arrondissement of Paris
- 1914–17 Department store La Samaritaine de Luxe, 27 boulevard des Capucines, 2nd arrondissement of Paris
- 1926–28 Extension (Magasin 2) of La Samaritaine, rue du Pont Neuf – quai du Louvre, 1st arrondissement of Paris, in collaboration with Henri Sauvage
- 1930–33 Extension (Magasin 3) of La Samaritaine, rue de Rivoli – rue du Pont-Neuf – rue Boucher, 1st arrondissement of Paris
- Date unknown. Restoration of the castle Châteauneuf-sur-Sarthe, Maine-et-Loire

== Selected publications ==
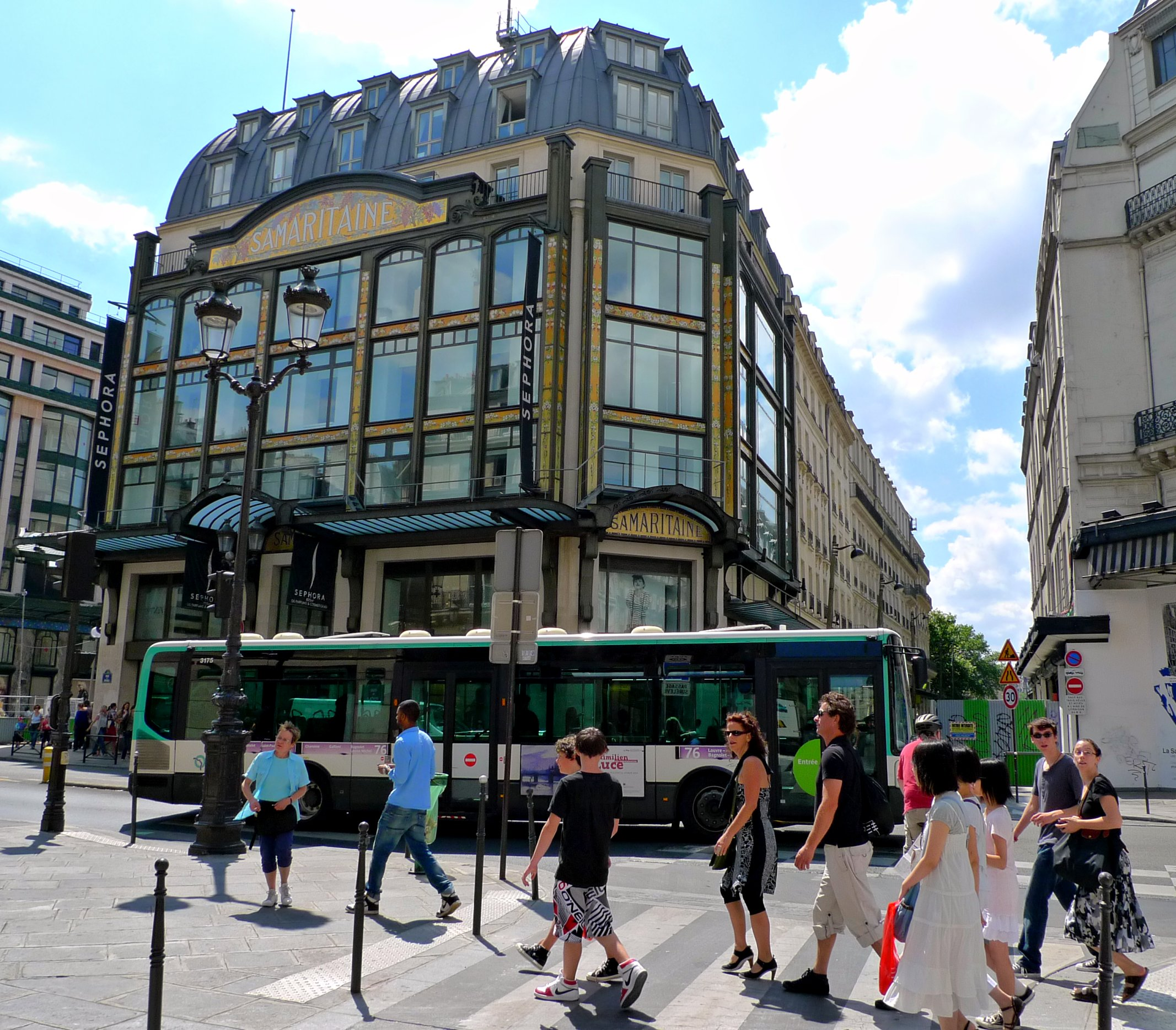
La Samaritaine Magazin 3

- Frantz Jourdain (1889). A la Côte. L'Harmattan. ISBN 978-2-296-02342-0.
- Frantz Jourdain; Charles Garnier (1892). Exposition Universelle de 1889: Constructions élevées Au Champ de Mars Par M. Ch. Garnier ... Pour Servir À L'histoire de L'habitation Humaine. Librarie centrale des beaux-arts.
- Frantz Jourdain (1893). L'Atelier Chantorel: moeurs d'artistes. Bibliothèque-Charpentier.
- Frantz Jourdain (1895). Les Decores. BiblioBazaar. ISBN 978-0-559-35084-9.
- Frantz Jourdain (1902). De choses et d'autres: toujours trop. H. Simonis Empis.
- Johann Wolfgang von Goethe; Frantz Jourdain (1904). Le Faust de Goethe, traduction de Gérard de Nerval. Préface de M. Frantz Jourdain... Société de propagation des livres d'art.
- Eugène Henri Alexandre Chigot; Frantz Jourdain (1905). Exposition de tableaux (marines et paysages flamands) par Eugène Chigot: 1-20 avril 1905. Galerie Georges Petit.
- Dr. Pierre Boyer; Henri Moulhiade; Frantz Jourdain (1913). Inauguration du monument Jules Vallès (au Puy-en-Velay): (Discours prononcés par MM. le Dr Pierre Boyer, Henri Moulhiade, Frantz Jourdain.). Badiou-Amant.
- Frantz Jourdain; Octave Mirbeau; Léon Werth; Théodore Duret (1914). Cézanne. Bernheim-Jeune.
- Frantz Jourdain (1922). Au pays du souvenir. G. Crès.
- Robert Mallet-Stevens; Frantz Jourdain (1923). Une cité moderne. Ch. Massin.
- Frantz Jourdain (1934). Grand palais. Exposition rétrospective du Jules Chéret...
- Frantz Jourdain (October 2013). L' Atelier Chantorel; Moeurs D'Artistes. Avant-Propos de J. -H. Rosny. ISBN 978-1-293-04075-1.

== Sources ==
- Bruand, Yves (2015). "JOURDAIN FRANTZ". Encyclopædia Universalis France (in French).
- Campbell, Gordon (2006-11-09). The Grove Encyclopedia of Decorative Arts. Oxford University Press. ISBN 978-0-19-518948-3.
- Clatin, Marianne (2003). "" Un brin de plume au manche du tire-ligne " : Frantz Jourdain (1847-1935)". Livraisons d'histoire de l'architecture (in French). 5 (5): 37–53. doi:10.3406/lha.2003.930.
- Clausen, Meredith L. (1987). Décoration & Le Rationalisme Architecturaux a L'Exposition Universelle. Brill Archive. ISBN 90-04-07879-7.
- "Frantz Jourdain (French, 1847–1935)". MoMA. Oxford University Press. 2009.
- Jourdain, Frantz (1847-1935). BnF.
- "La Semeuse". PSS-archi.
