= 1889 in architecture =

The year 1889 in architecture involved some significant events.

== Events ==
- May 6–October 31 – Exposition Universelle in Paris, with the Eiffel Tower as its entrance arch. The Galerie des machines, designed by architect Ferdinand Dutert and engineer Victor Contamin, at 111 m, spans the longest interior space in the world at this time. Among the Exposition displays is the History of Habitation, a series of houses designed by Charles Garnier imaginatively illustrating dwellings across many civilizations.
- August 10 – At the Vienna Hofburg, the grand opening ceremony is held for the Imperial Natural History Museum (German: K.k. Naturhistorisches Hofmuseum), begun in 1871; from August 13 to the end of December, the museum counts 175,000 visitors.

== Buildings and structures ==
=== Buildings opened ===
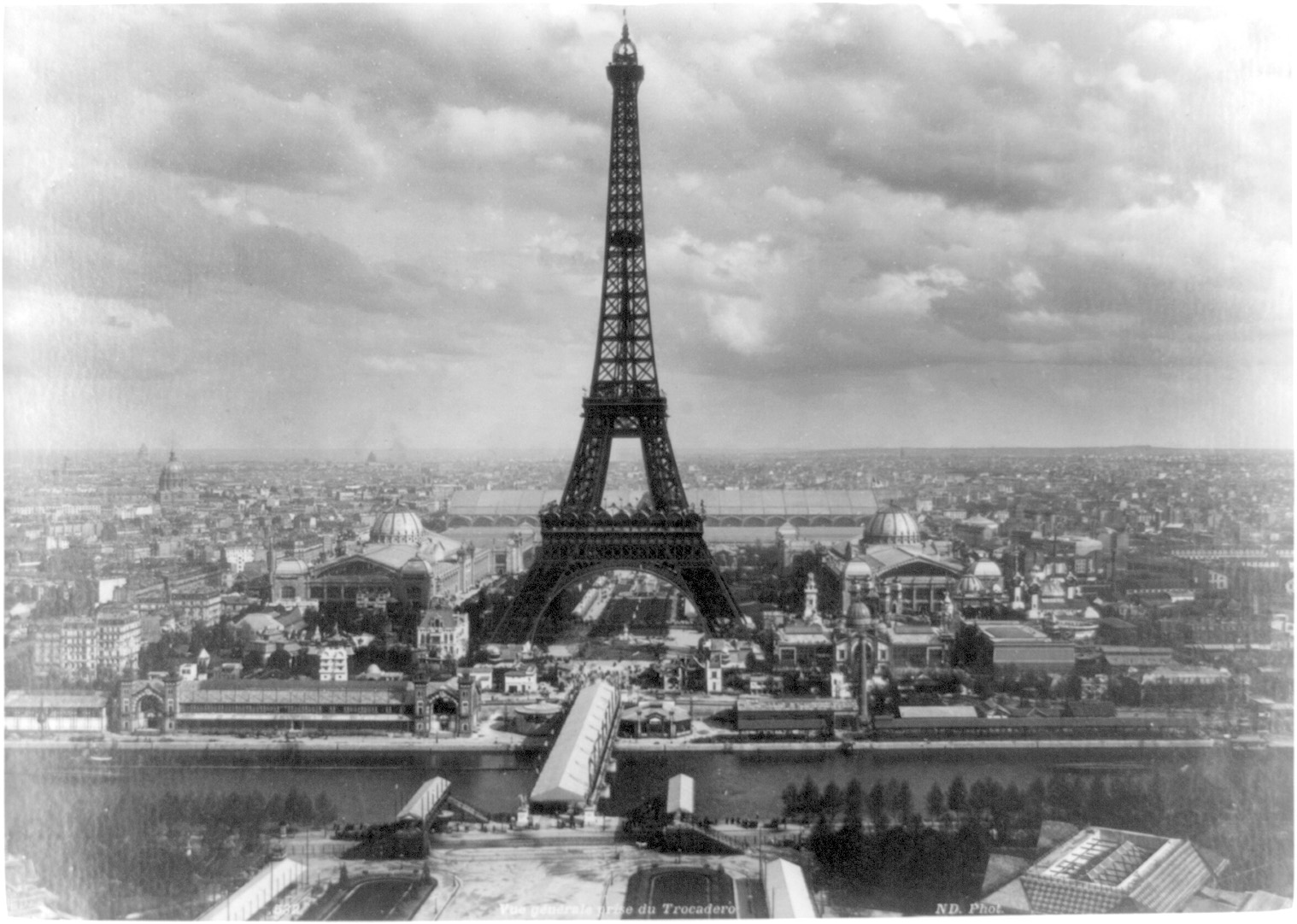
Eiffel Tower and Exposition Universelle

- March 31 – Eiffel Tower in Paris, designed by Gustave Eiffel. At 300 m, its height exceeds the previous tallest structure in the world by 130 m.
- April 10 – A star is placed on the Mole Antonelliana in Turin, Italy, designed by Alessandro Antonelli, bringing the building's total height to 167.5 m (550 ft), making it the tallest brick building in Europe.
- April 27 – The Ilha Fiscal Customs House, Brazil
- June 30 — Cathedral of Saints Peter and Paul in Providence, Rhode Island, designed by Patrick Keely, is consecrated.
- October 15 – Amsterdam Centraal railway station in the Netherlands, designed by Pierre Cuypers with roof engineered by L. J. Eijmer
- December 9 – Auditorium Building in Chicago, United States, designed by Louis Sullivan and Dankmar Adler

== Buildings completed ==
- July 12 – Cathedral of the Blessed Sacrament (Sacramento, California), United States, designed by Bryan J. Klinch
- Custom House, Brisbane, Australia, designed by Charles McLay
- Georgia State Capitol in Atlanta, United States, designed by Edbrooke and Burnham
- Lillesand Church, Norway, designed by Henrik Thrap-Meyer
- First Presbyterian Church (Detroit, Michigan), United States, designed by George D. Mason and Zachariah Rice
- St George's Church, Lisbon, Portugal, designed by John Medland and Charles Edward Powell
- St. Lawrence Anglican Cathedral Ambohimanoro on Madagascar, designed by William White
- Palau Güell in Barcelona, designed by Antoni Gaudí
- Science Hall in University of Minnesota Old Campus Historic District, Minneapolis, United States, designed by Leroy Buffington and his assistant Harvey Ellis
- Germania Bank Building in Saint Paul, Minnesota, United States, designed by J. Walter Stevens assisted by Harvey Ellis
- Corbin Building in New York City, United States, designed by Francis H. Kimball
- St. James Episcopal Church (Cambridge, Massachusetts), United States, designed by Henry M. Congdon

== Awards ==
- RIBA Royal Gold Medal – Charles Thomas Newton.

== Births ==
- May 10 – Mihran Mesrobian, Armenian-born American (died 1975)
- May 21 – R. Harold Zook, American architect (died 1949)
- June 24 – Charles Cowles-Voysey, English architect (died 1981)
- August 26 – Jan Buijs, Dutch architect (died 1961)
- October 25 – Sven Markelius, Swedish architect (died 1972)
- December 23 – Joseph Emberton, English modernist architect (died 1956)

== Deaths ==
- March 10 – John Rhind, Scottish architect (born 1836)
- June 1 – Charles Lanyon, English architect working in Northern Ireland (born 1813)
- unknown date – James Hardie, American architect active in Natchez, Mississippi
