= Francis Jourdain =

French painter (1876–1958)

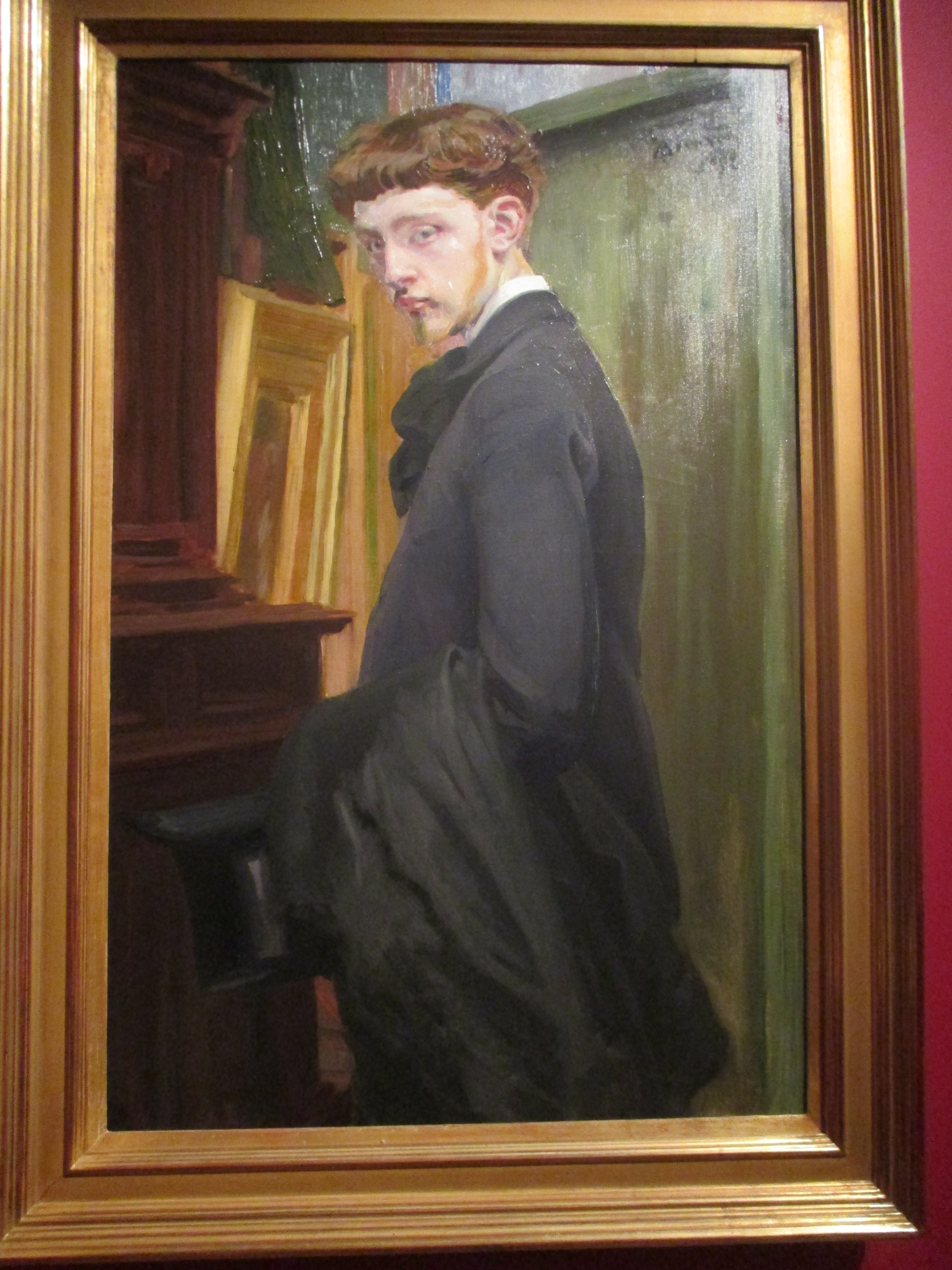
- Jourdain by Paul-Albert Besnard
- Born: 2 November 1876; Paris, Ile-de-France, France
- Died: 31 December 1958 (aged 82); Paris, Ile-de-France, France
- Occupations: Decorative artist, political activist
- Parent: Frantz Jourdain

Francis Jourdain (2 November 1876 – 31 December 1958) was a French painter, furniture maker, interior designer, maker of ceramics, and other decorative arts, and a left-wing political activist.

== Early years ==
Francis Jourdain was born on 2 November 1876, son of the architect Frantz Jourdain. His father was the founder of the Salon d'Automne collection. Jourdain said of the society in which he grew up that it was dominated by people who were highly opinionated and quick to take sides. Although its members pretended to be in favor of liberty and compassion, he saw it as tainted by prejudices, xenophobia and extreme emotion. His father was very much typical of this society. A stenciled panel by Jourdain with elegant, cleanly silhouetted images was shown at the 1900 Exposition Universelle in Paris.

== Designer ==
In 1911, Jourdain began to design furniture, following the teachings of Adolf Loos. He opened Les Ateliers Modernes in 1912, a small furniture factory. He designed modular wooden furniture for working-class people, advertising in the socialist paper L'Humanité. With his built-in furniture and storage systems he was able to make small areas appear spacious. He owned a furniture shop by 1919, Chez Francis Jourdain. Jourdain was a regular exhibitor from 1913 to 1928 at the Salon d'Automne and the Societé des Artistes Décorateurs. Jourdain published many articles on modern art and aesthetics in which he attacked the ostentatious luxury that was typical of contemporary French design. His own designs were simple, with straightforward construction. He collaborated with Le Corbusier in 1920 in publishing a journal titled L'esprit nouveau, subsidized by the government. It advocated standardization and industrial production as an alternative to individual design, required to rebuild the shattered French society and economy of the years following World War I (1914–18).

At the 1925 Exposition Internationale des Arts Décoratifs et Industriels Modernes (International Exposition of Modern Industrial and Decorative Arts) Jourdain's "Physical Culture Room", unlike other exhibits, did not emphasize luxury living. His design used smooth wood paneling on the walls and ceilings that resembled riveted sheets of metal. He worked with Robert Mallet-Stevens between 1925 and 1930. An interior he designed for an Intellectual Worker was exhibited in 1937 at the Exposition Internationale des Arts et Techniques dans la Vie Moderne in Paris.

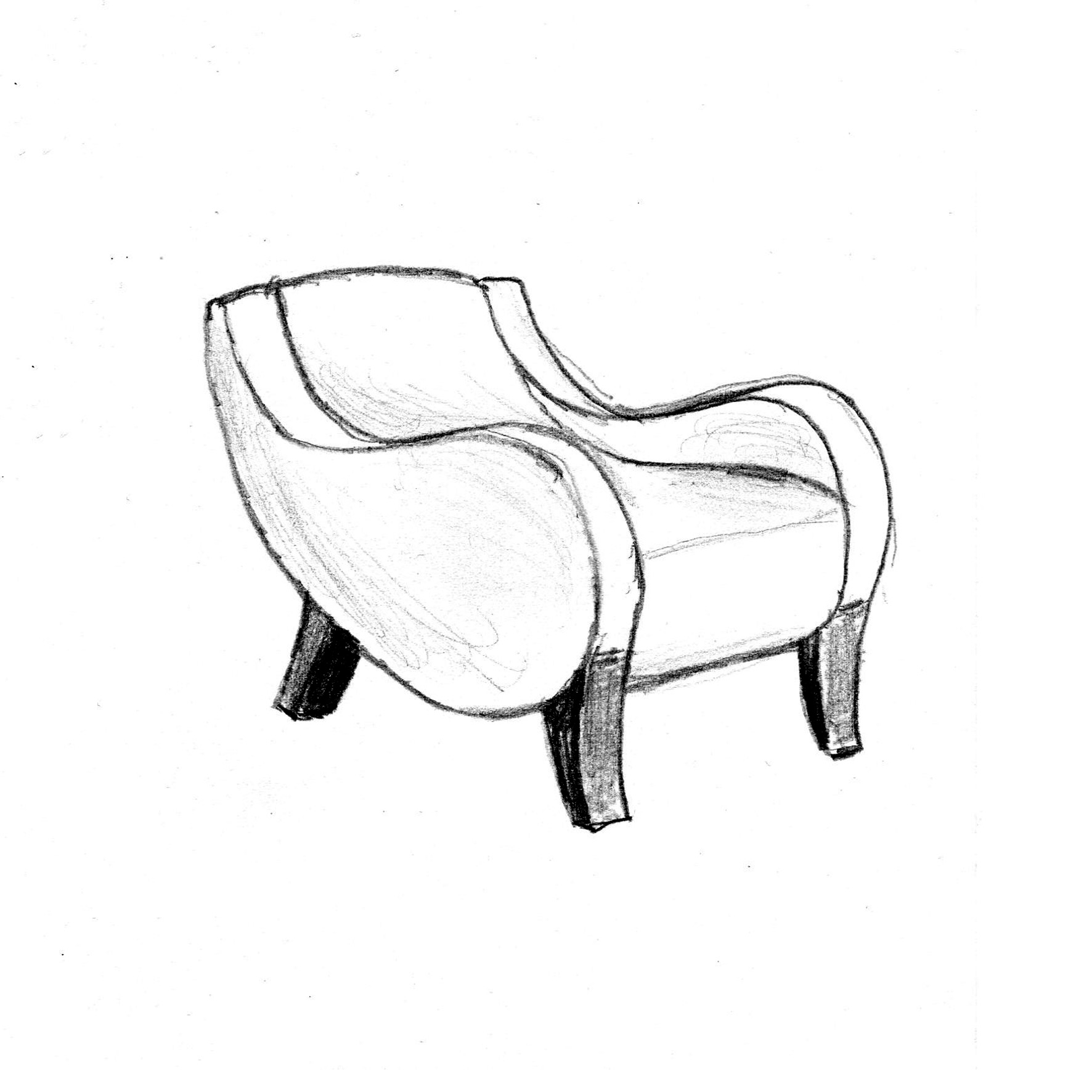
Comma armchair, 1922

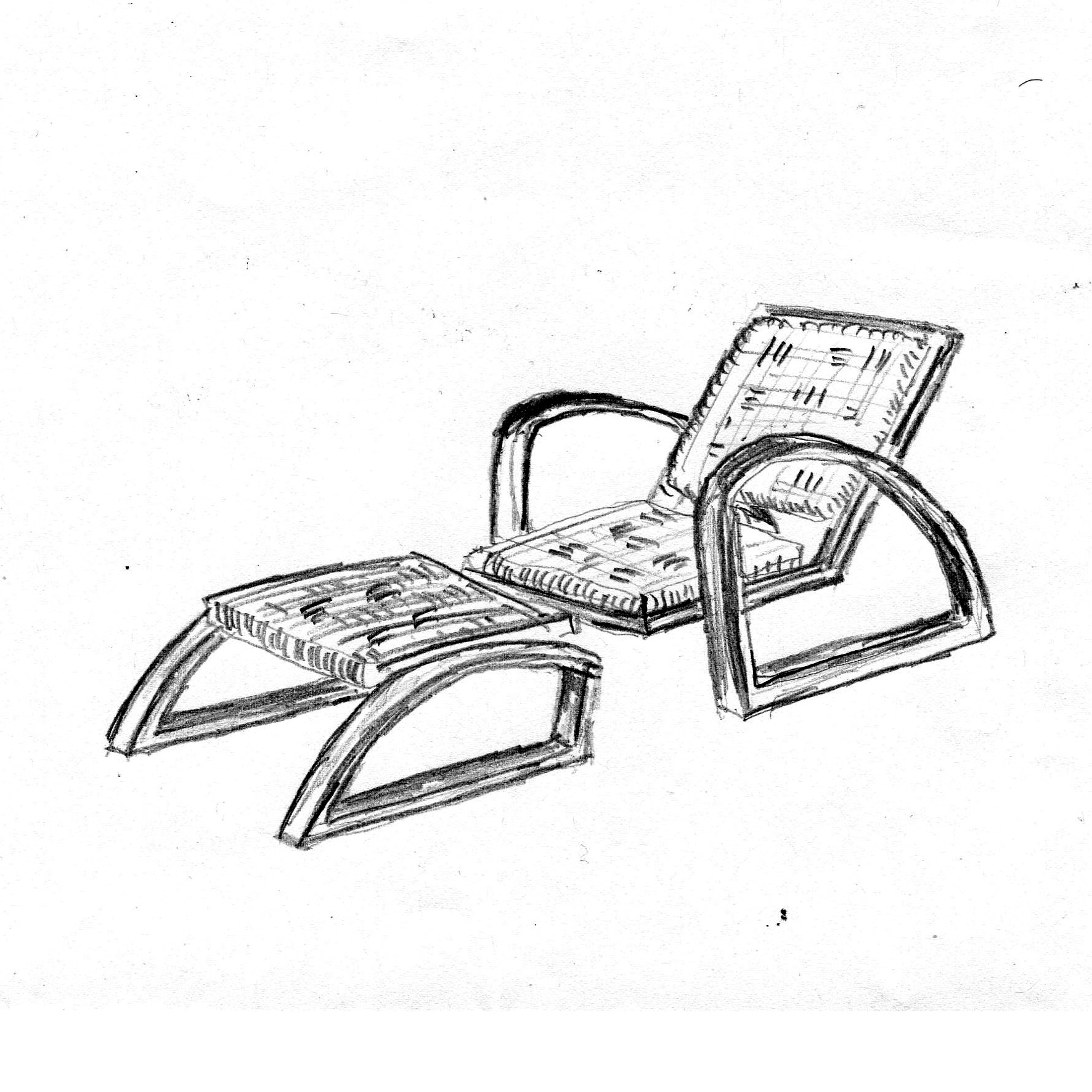
Deckchair, 1928

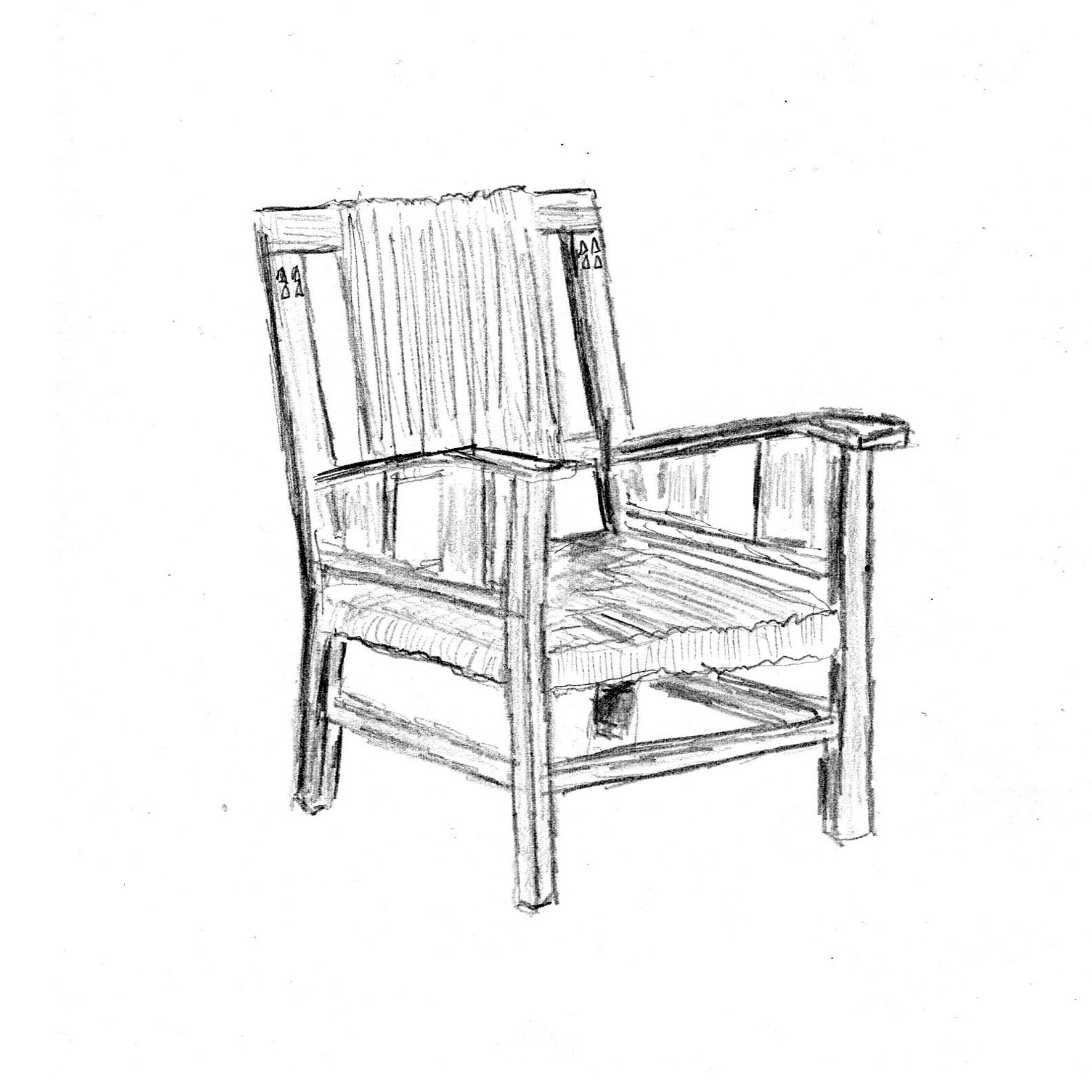
Chair, c. 1930

== Political activity ==
In 1939, he was Secretary General of the World Committee Against War and Fascism. The committee's letterhead showed Henri Barbusse as Founder and Romain Rolland as Honorary President. The council included Paul Langevin, Jean Longuet, and André Malraux of France, Sir Norman Angell of England, Heinrich Mann of Germany, Harry F. Ward, Sherwood Anderson and John dos Passos of the United States and A. A. MacLeod of Canada. Francis Jourdain invited Professor J. B. S. Haldane to attend a great International Conference in Defence of Peace and Humanity that was to be held in Paris on 13–14 May 1939. Haldane expressed his support but declined the invitation.

Jourdain was a prolific writer on art in the period after World War 2. He died in Paris on 31 December 1958 at the age of 82.

Jourdain was a dreyfusard and an anarchist.

== Sources ==
- Campbell, Gordon, ed. (2006). "Jourdain, Francis". The Grove Encyclopedia of Decorative Arts. Oxford University Press. doi:10.1093/acref/9780195189483.001.0001. ISBN 978-0-19-518948-3.
- Clausen, Meredith L. (1987). Décoration & Le Rationalisme Architecturaux a L'Exposition Universelle. Brill Archive. ISBN 90-04-07879-7.
- Doran, P. Michael (2001). Conversations with Cézanne. University of California Press. ISBN 978-0-520-22519-0.
- Jourdain, Francis; Haldane, J.B.S. (1939). "Letters between the World Committee Against War and Fascism and J B S Haldane". University College London.
- Raizman, David (2003). History of Modern Design: Graphics and Products Since the Industrial Revolution. Laurence King Publishing. ISBN 978-1-85669-348-6.
