= Gallery of Paleontology and Comparative Anatomy =

Museum in Paris, France

Galerie de Paléontologie et d'Anatomie comparée
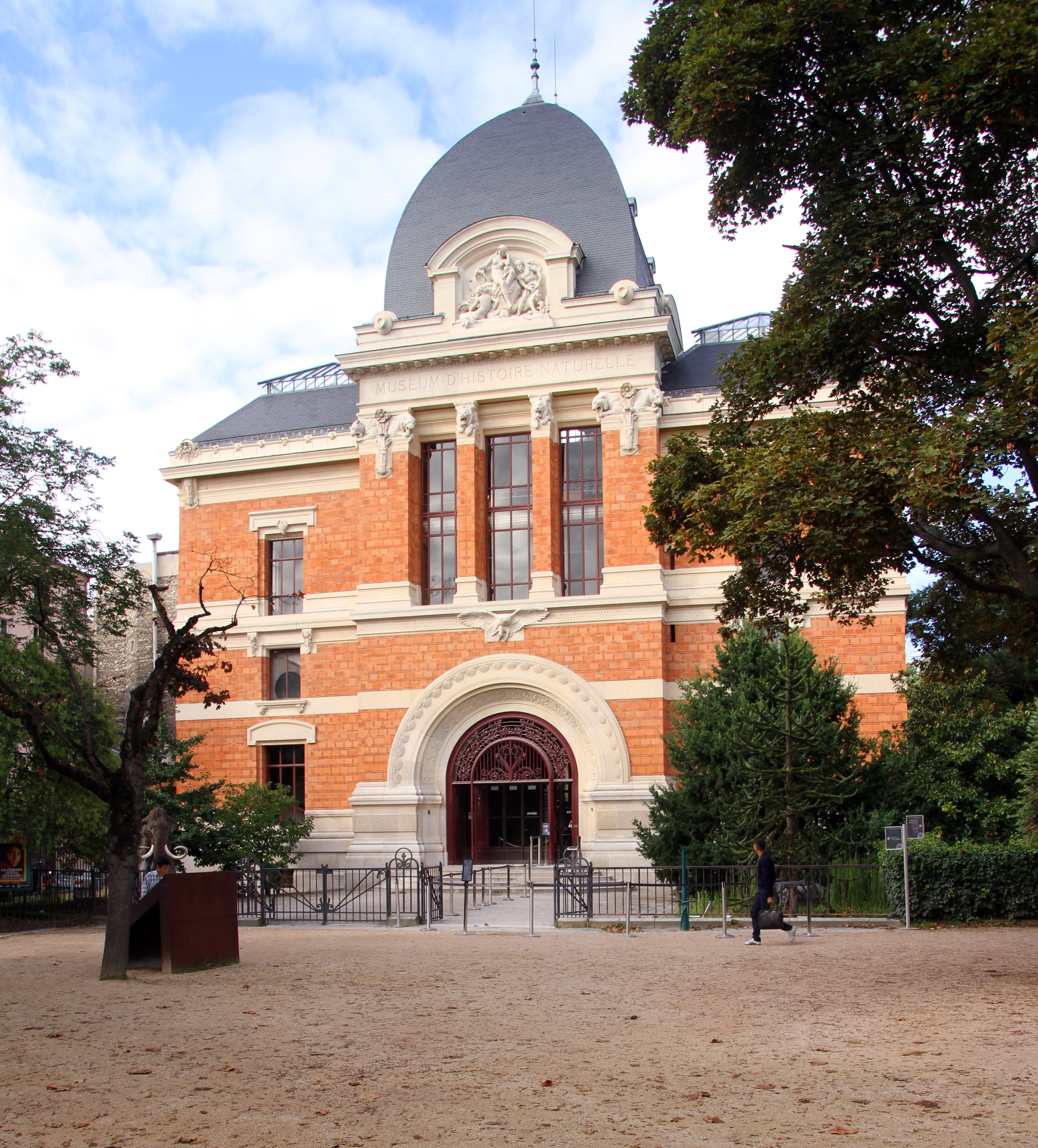
- Established: 1898
- Location: Paris
- Coordinates: 48.843056°N 2.362778°E
- Type: Paleontology
- Website: www.mnhn.fr

The Gallery of Paleontology and Comparative Anatomy (in French, Galerie de Paléontologie et d'Anatomie comparée) is a part of the French National Museum of Natural History (Muséum national d'histoire naturelle, MNHN). It is situated in the Jardin des plantes in Paris near the Gare d'Austerlitz.

The Gallery of Comparative Anatomy (occupying the ground floor), holds nearly a thousand skeletons and interprets their organization and classification. The Gallery of Paleontology (occupying the first and second floor) presents a famous collection of fossil vertebrates, fossil invertebrates and fossil plants. Among the most appreciated pieces by the public is a series of dinosaur skeleton casts (Diplodocus, Iguanodon, Allosaurus, Carnotaurus, Tarbosaurus, Unenlagia, Dromaeosaurus, Bambiraptor) but also a Tyrannosaurus skull (cast of specimen AMNH 5027), an authentic skull of Triceratops, an authentic Compsognathus skeleton, and some authentic fossilised skeletons of other extinct animals like Sarcosuchus, Cynthiacetus, Mammuthus meridionalis, Mammuthus primigenius, Megatherium, Thalassocnus, Ursus spelaeus, Panthera leo spelaea, Aepyornis and many others.

== History ==
The project of a "Gallery of Paleontology, Comparative Anatomy and Anthropology" started in the late 1880s when the Galerie de Zoologie (Gallery of Zoology) was inaugurated in 1889. (Note: Since 1994, this Galerie de Zoologie (Gallery of Zoology) has been renamed as the grande Galerie de l'Évolution or Gallery of Evolution as it is called in English.) The collections in the former galleries of comparative anatomy (founded by Georges Cuvier in 1802 and constituted by bones, skeletons and preserved organs) were running out of room in the 1880s and 1890s and the inauguration of the Gallery of Zoology (mainly constituted by stuffed animals) encouraged this project, proposed by professors Albert Gaudry (Professor of Paleontology), Georges Pouchet (Professor of Comparative Anatomy) and Armand de Quatrefages (Professor of Anthropology), who wished to preserve and present to the public collections of great historic and scientific importance. In addition, two approaching events led to make concrete the project: the first centennial of the French National Museum of Natural History (1793-1893) and the Exposition Universelle de Paris of 1900. In 1892 the Muséum national D'Histoire Naturelle appointed the French architect Ferdinand Dutert to design the building and produce the drawing plans, and the works were launched in 1893, lasting until 1898. After that, the collections in the former building (Galleries of Comparative Anatomy, founded by Cuvier in 1802, and Gallery of Anthropology, founded by Quatrefages in 1855) were transferred to the new building, which was inaugurated on 21 July 1898. Even in the present day, the collections derive from the great expeditions of the traveller-naturalists of the 18th and 19th centuries as well as from the ménagerie du Jardin des plantes (one of the oldest zoos in the world).

The remarkable Gallery building, designed by the architect Ferdinand Dutert consists of two floors which are sorted in three levels (ground floor, first floor and second floor) and its surface area is approximately 2,500 square metres (27,000 sq ft). The gallery, made of stone and metal, is almost 80 metres (260 ft) long, the facades are decorated with sculptures inspired by naturalists and large windows afford abundant natural light. Originally, the second floor (two rooms and the mezzanine over the first floor) was occupied by the Anthropology collections, but in 1937 these collections migrated to the new musée de l'Homme. Since then the second floor displays the fossil invertebrates and, in addition, and since the early 2010s, the fossil plants.

== Gallery ==
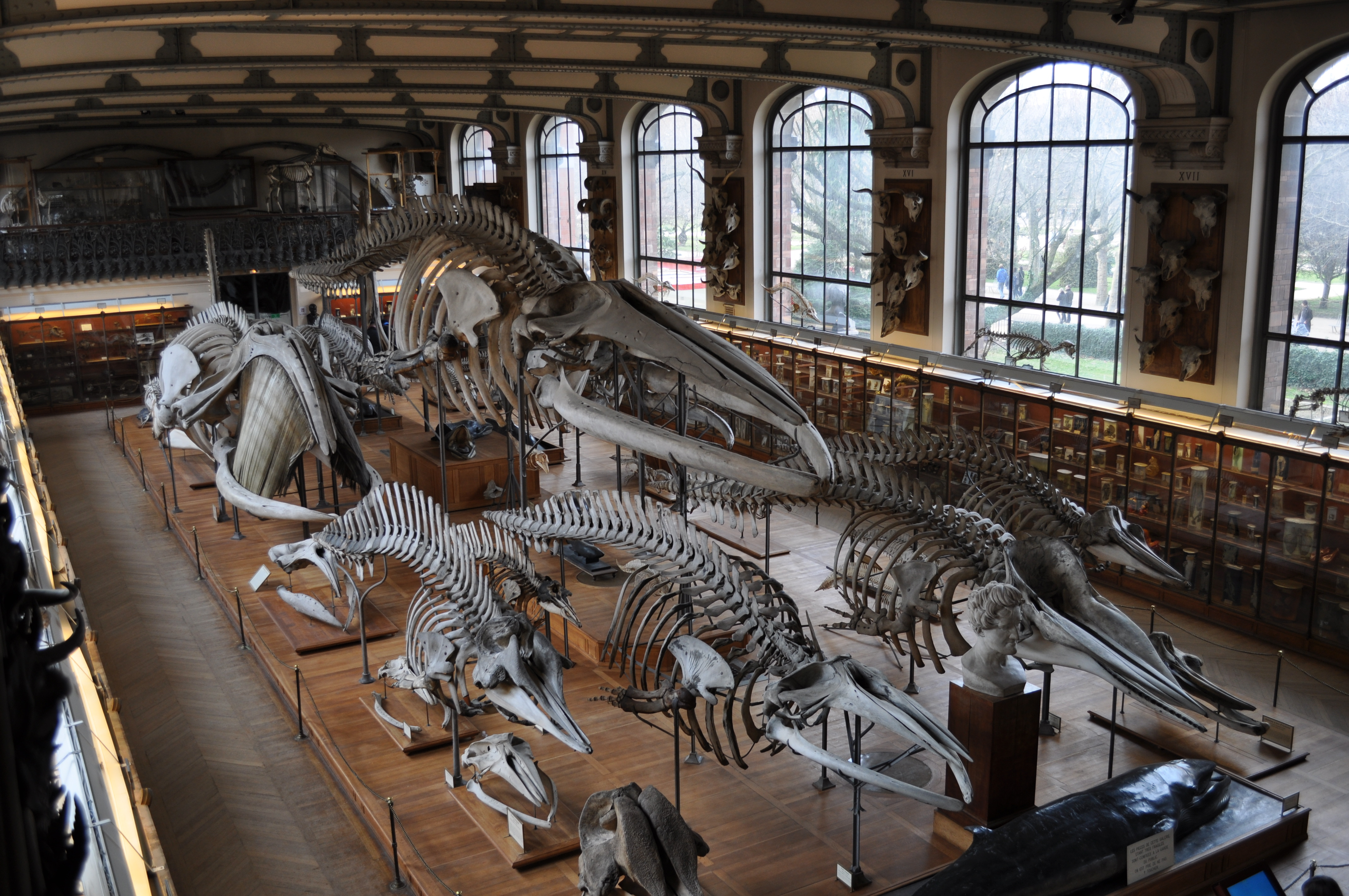
Half of the Gallery of Comparative Anatomy, ground floor of the building.

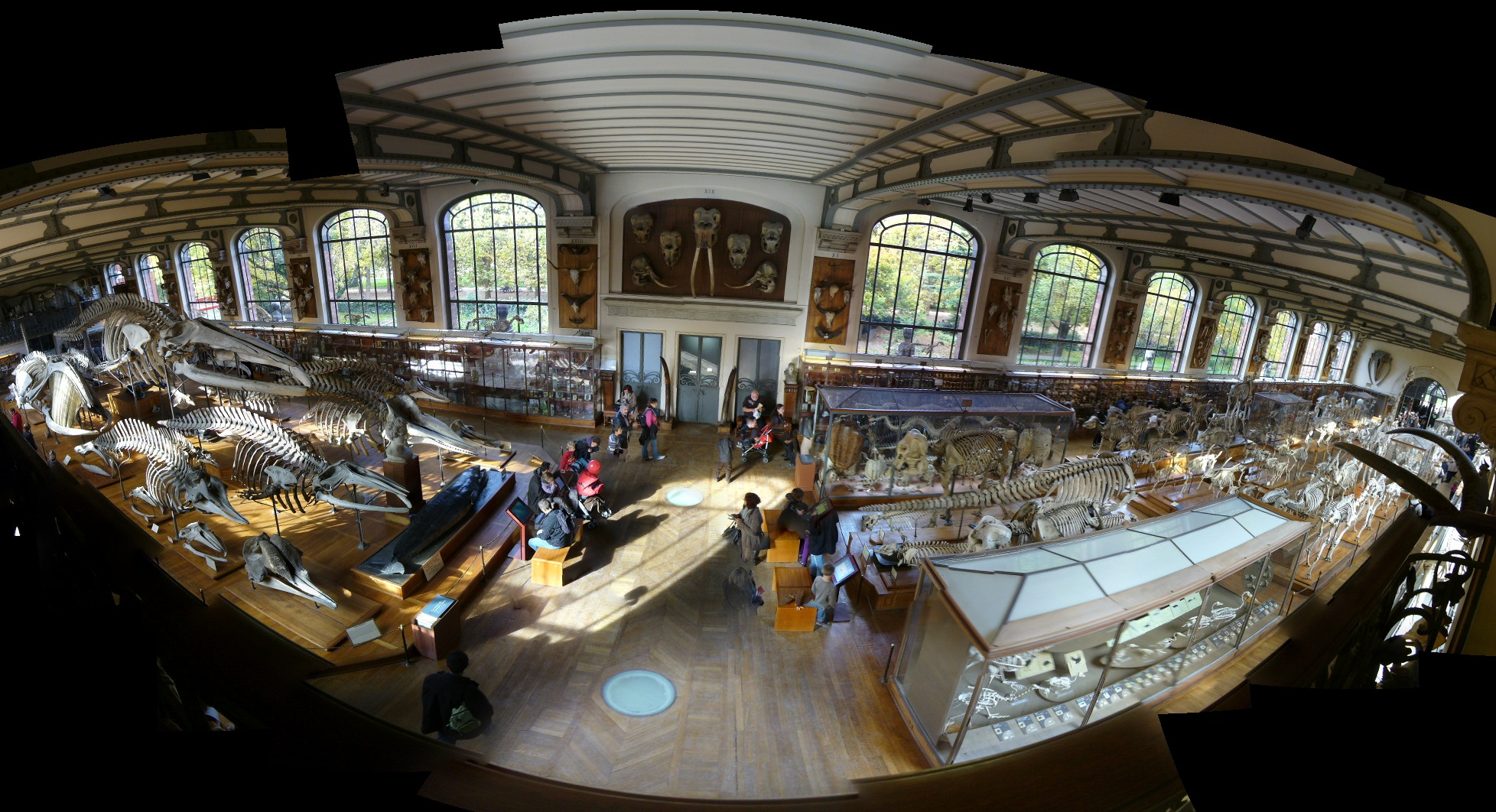
Ground floor, panoramic view

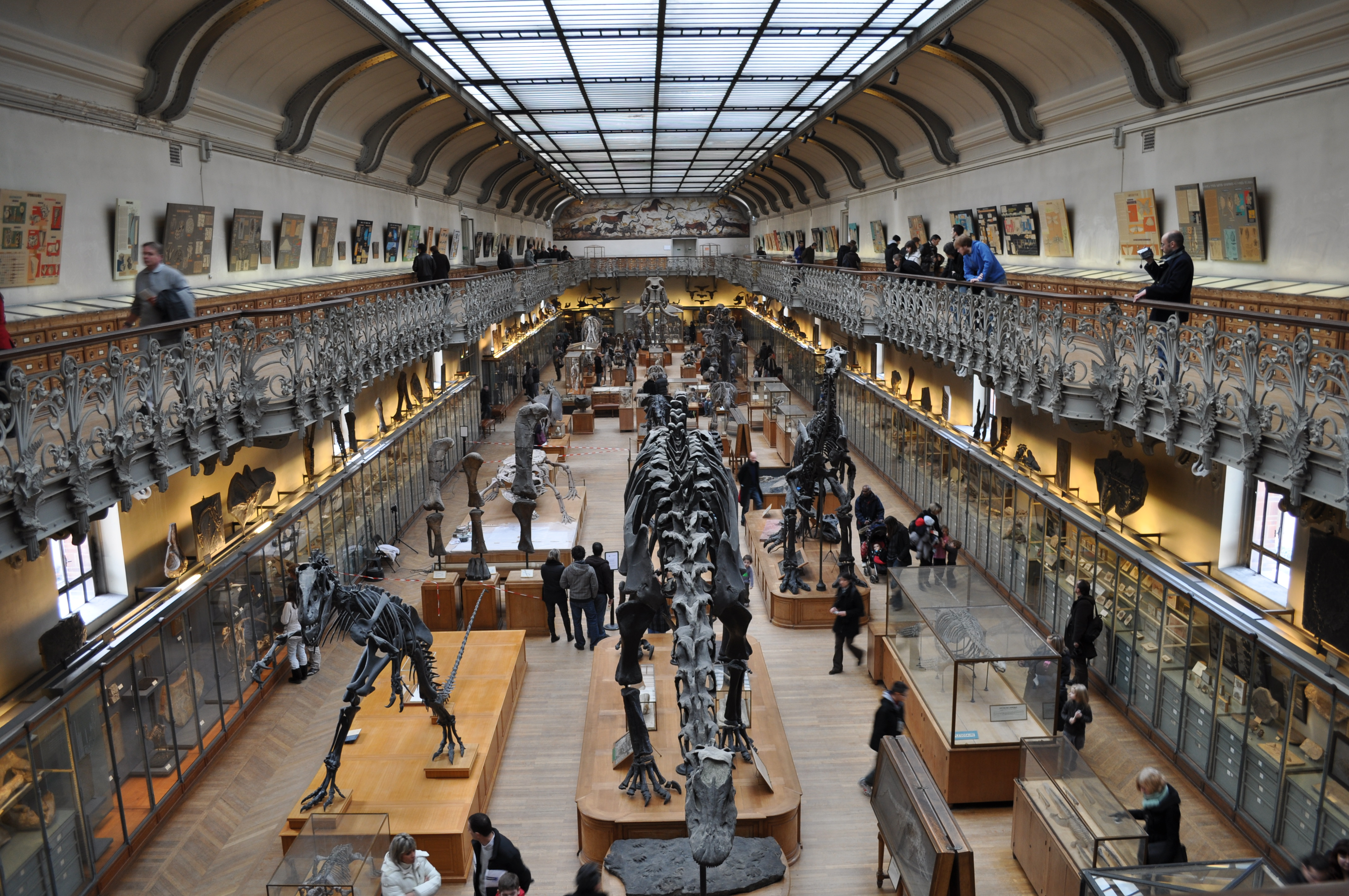
First and second floor of the building (photograph taken from the second floor mezzanine).

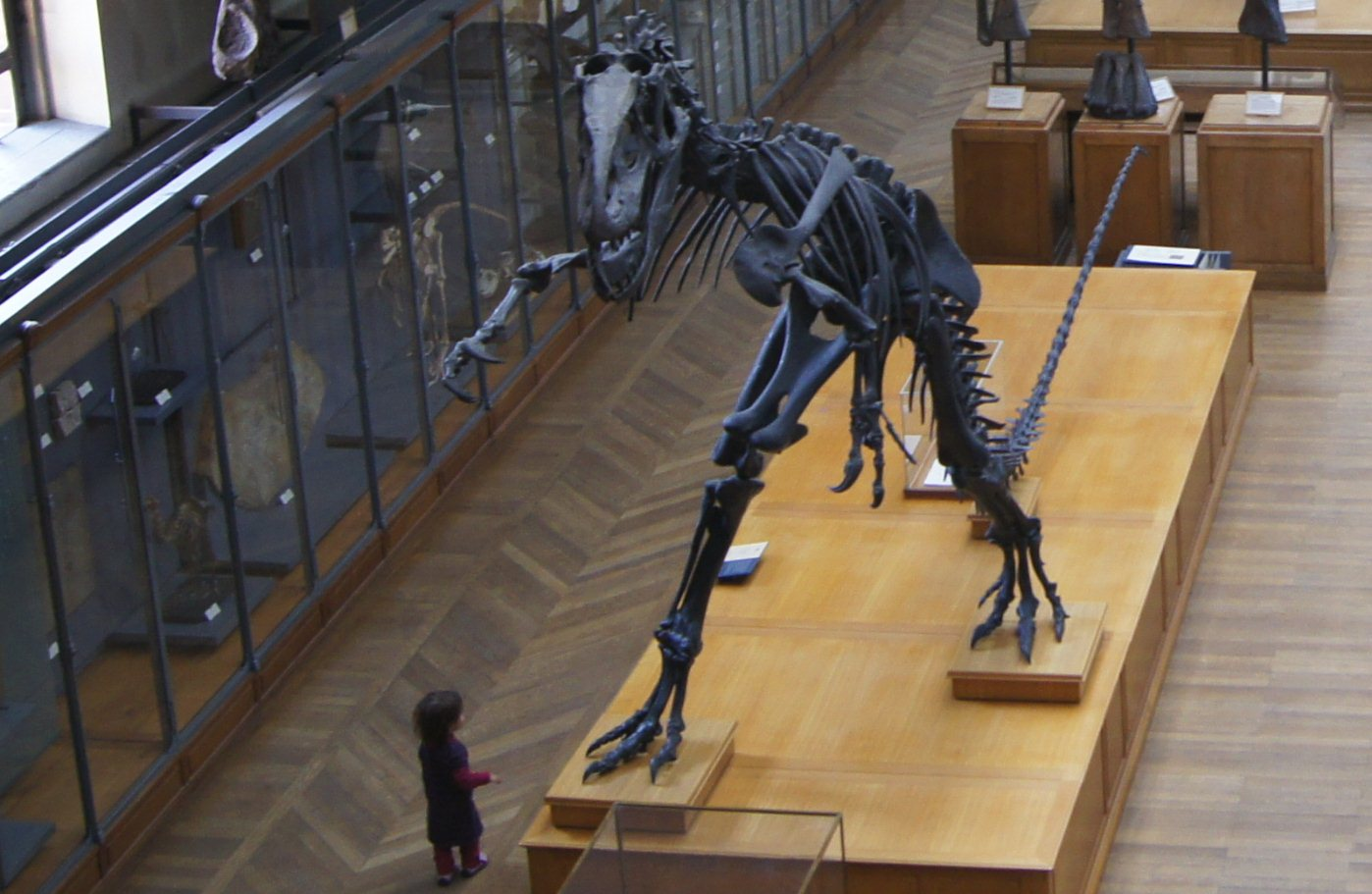
Allosaurus fragilis on the first floor

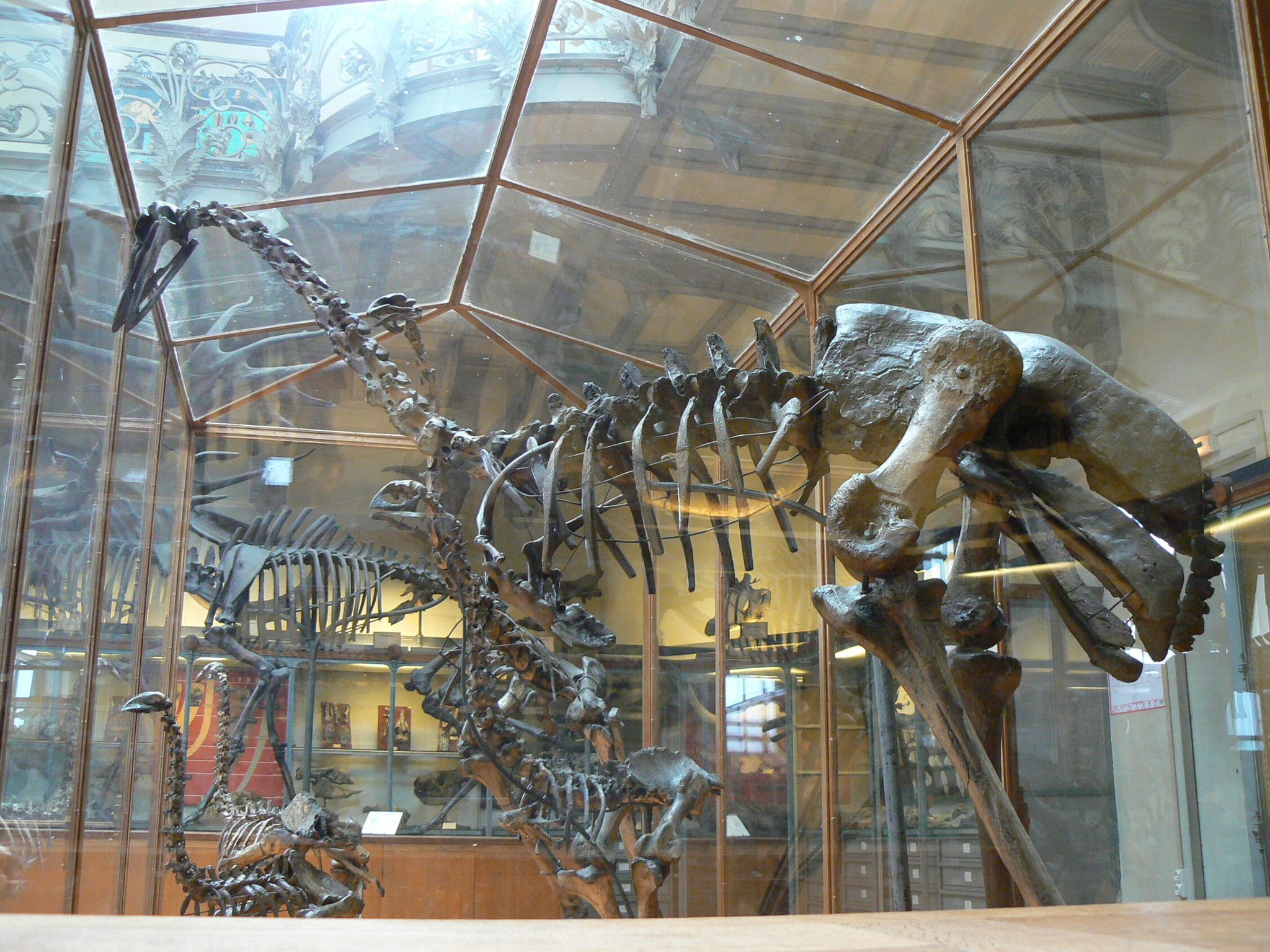
Aepyornis on the first floor
