= Édouard Sain =

French painter

Édouard Alexandre Sain
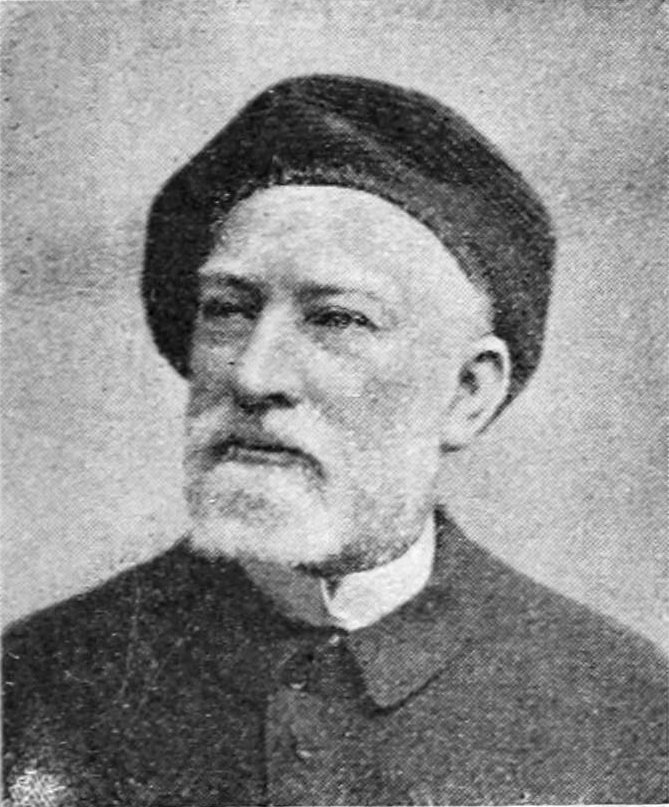
- Born: 13 May 1830; Cluny, Saône-et-Loire France
- Died: 26 June 1910 (aged 80); 9th arrondissement of Paris, France
- Occupation: Painter
- Known for: Chevalier of the Légion d'honneur in 1877

Édouard Alexandre Sain (13 May 1830 – 26 June 1910) was a French painter whose works included historical and genre subjects as well as portraits.

== Birth and education ==
Édouard Alexandre Sain was born Cluny, Saône-et-Loire, on 13 May 1830, son of Paul-François-Toussaint Sain, a tax-collector, and Palmire-Ernestine Bouchet. He first studied at the Valenciennes Academy, then entered the studio of François-Édouard Picot. In 1847 he was admitted to the École nationale supérieure des Beaux-Arts (School of Fine Arts), where he won all the medals.

== Career ==
Sain was strongly interested in antiquity. He first settled at Écouen, where he painted various rustic scenes in the plein air style, but experimented with other styles. His paintings from this period include Vénus et l'Amour, a group of chimney sweeps and a historical painting of the period of Louis XV. He first exhibited at the Salon of 1853, where he twice obtained the medal. An 1855 oil painting by Sain commemorates a visit by the Emperor and Empress of France to the crèche of Sister Rosalie. This work seems to have been undertaken on his own initiative. It was not purchased by the state or exhibited at the Salon.

In November 1863 Sain left on a trip to Rome, and in 1864 went on to Naples. He drew Mount Vesuvius and visited Pompei. In July 1864 he reached Capri, where he was inspired to make various paintings in what was then considered the modern style, although with classical elements. His 1865 Fouilles à Pompéi (Excavations at Pompei) depicts a group of barefoot women carrying baskets over their heads. Other paintings include Le Payement (Rome, 1865), Fileuse à Capri, Romaine (1870), Napolitaine (1870), La Convalescente en pèlerinage à la madone d'Angri (1873), La Marica de Capri (1874), Le Repas de noces à Capri (1875), Jésus et la Samaritaine (1876) and Andromède (1877). He recorded his trip to Italy in an 1879 book, Souvenirs d'Italie. Impressions de voyage.

From the late 1870s Sain devoted himself exclusively to the art of portrait and female nudes. For his portraits he often took members of fashionable society, and took care over the composition and accessories while also capturing the expression of the sitter. His portraits were generally simple and elegant. His subjects included M. Lambrecht, Mme la comtesse de Brimont, Mlle Lambrecht, Mmr la vicomtesse de Montreuil, M. Gaillard de Witt, Mme la baronne Morio de l'Isle and Mme Gaillard de Witt. He painted Virginie Amélie Avegno Gautreau, a demure and conventional portrait quite unlike the 1883 painting of the same model by John Singer Sargent that had created a recent stir.

Sain was awarded the Legion of Honour in 1877. Edward Sain was a friend of Carolus-Duran, who gave him the Legion of Honour and made his portrait.

Edward Sain died on 26 June 1910 in the 9th arrondissement of Paris, France.

== Gallery ==
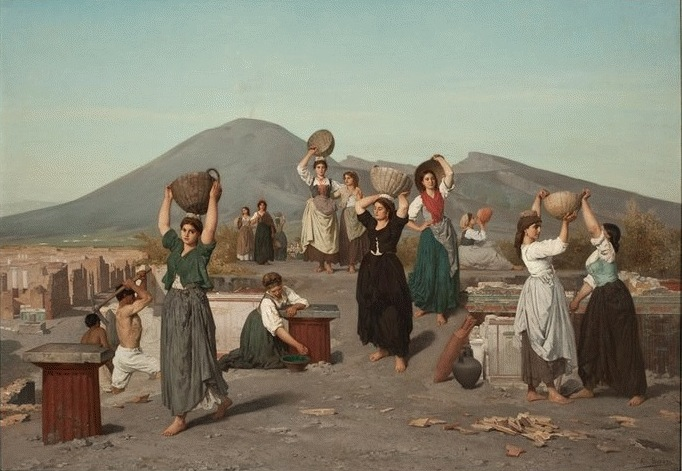
Fouilles à Pompéi (Excavations at Pompei) (1865)

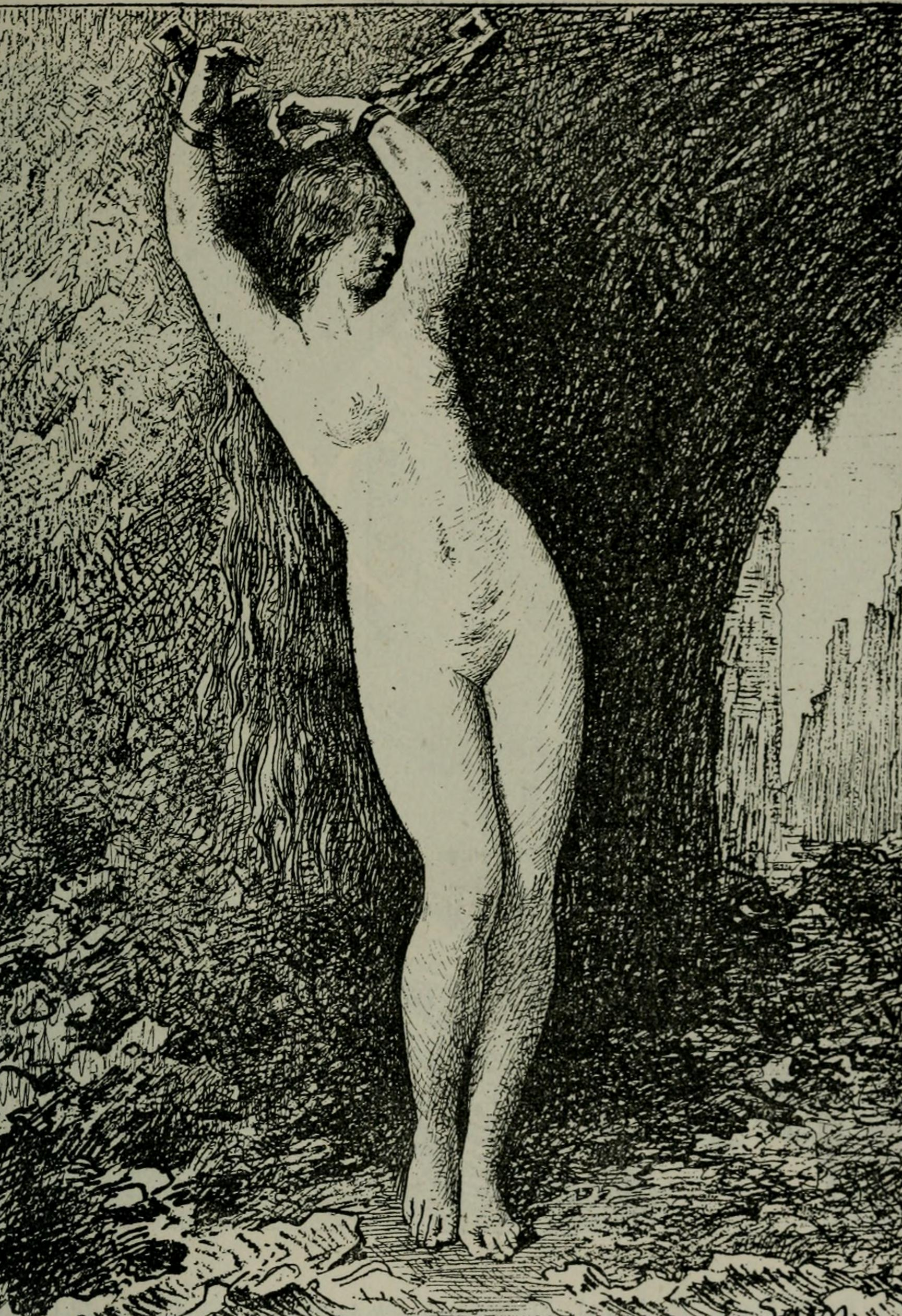
Andromeda (1883)

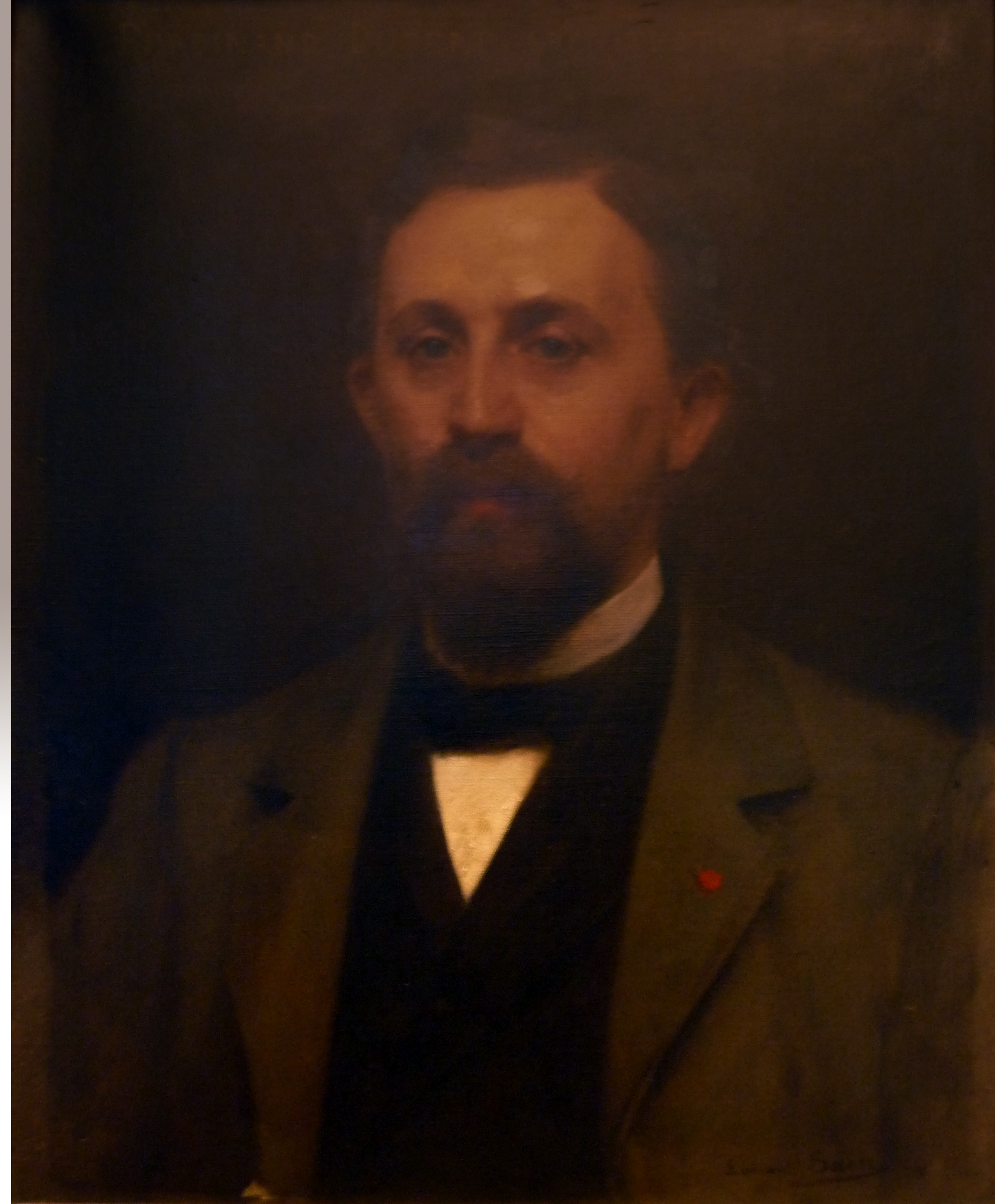
Ferdinand Dutert (1891)

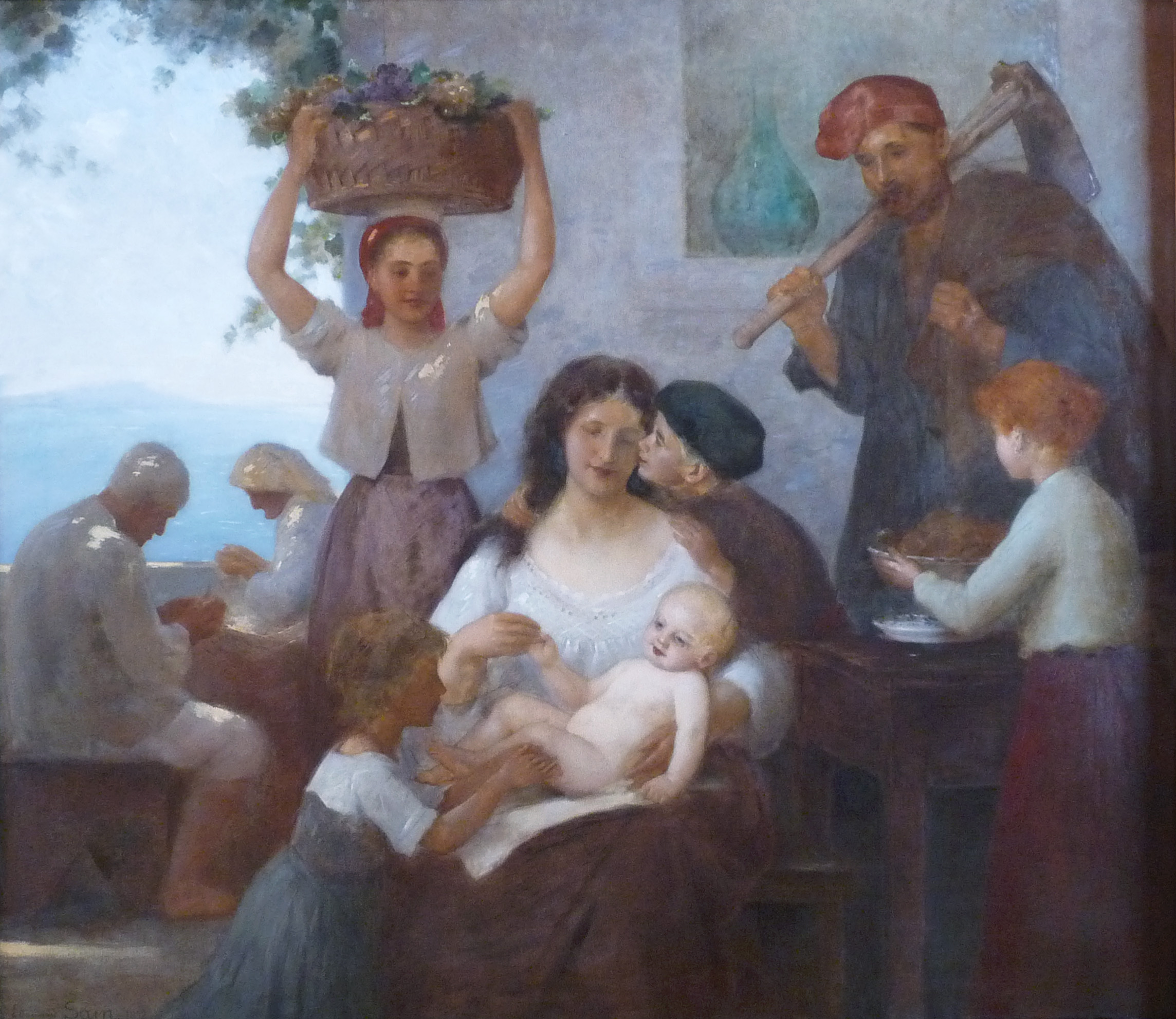
The Family (1892)

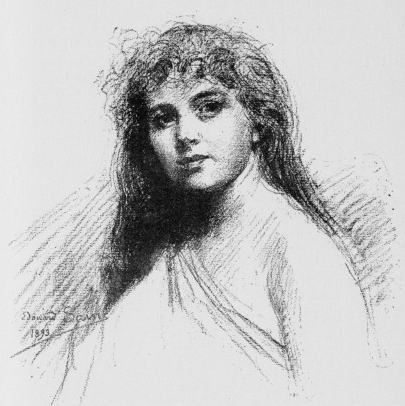
Study for a portrait (1893)

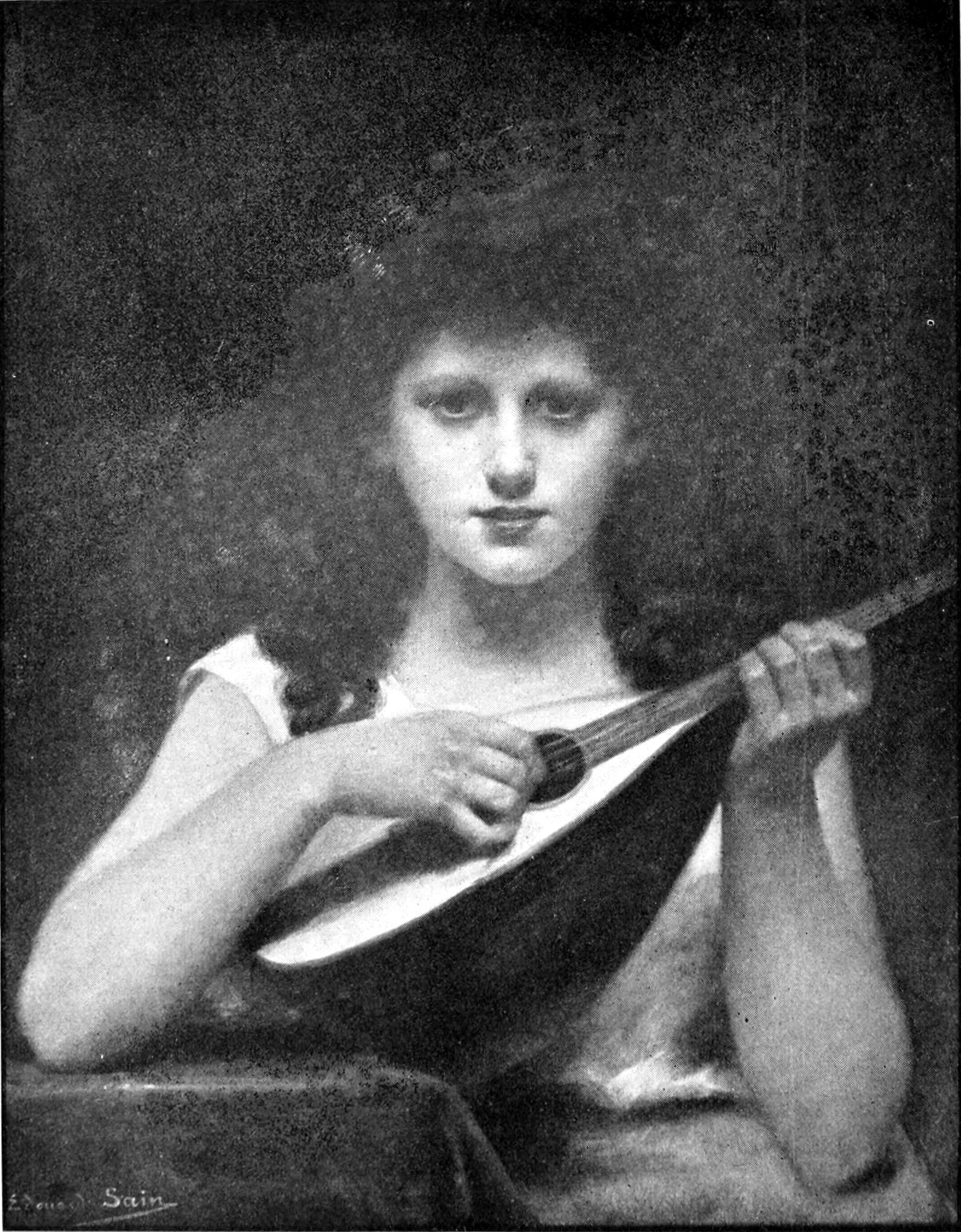
Mandolin player

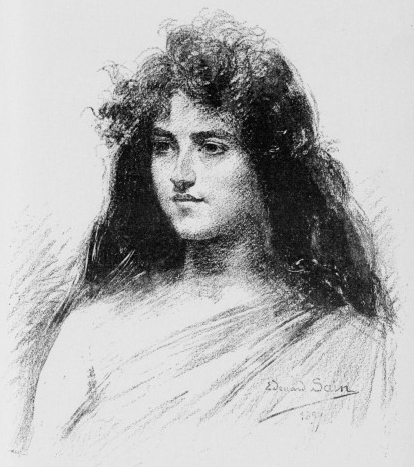
Study in charcoal (1897)

== Bibliography ==
- Sain, Édouard de (1879). Souvenirs d'Italie. Impressions de voyage. Saint-Germain: D. Bardin.
