= Galerie des machines =

Coordinates: 48.8536°N 2.3018°E

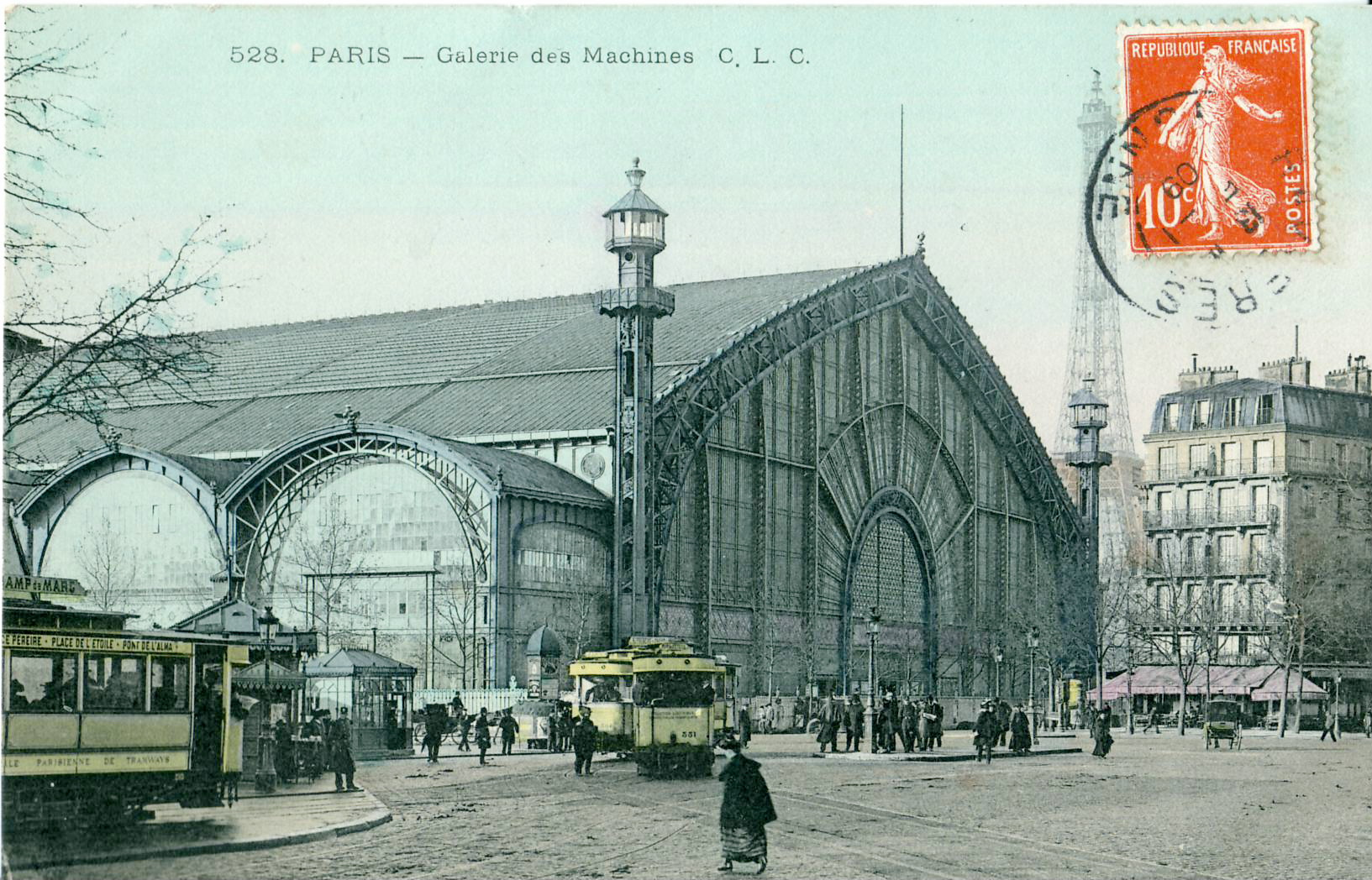
- La galerie des machines
- Interactive map of the Galerie des machines area

General information
- Type: Exhibition pavilion
- Location: Paris, France
- Completed: 1889
- Demolished: 1910
- Client: Exposition Universelle (1889)

Height
- Height: 48.324 metres (158.54 ft)

Technical details
- Structural system: Cast iron arches
- Floor area: 8 hectares (20 acres)

Design and construction
- Architect: Ferdinand Dutert
- Structural engineer: Victor Contamin

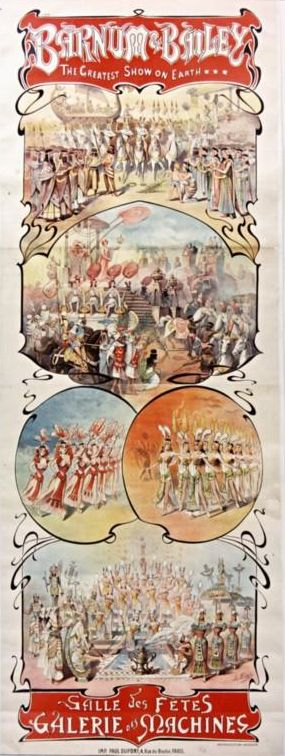
Barnum & Bailey Greatest Show On Earth poster

The Galerie des machines (officially: Palais des machines) was a pavilion built for the 1889 Exposition Universelle in Paris. Located in the Grenelle district, the huge pavilion was made of iron, steel and glass. It was built by the engineer Victor Contamin and the architect Ferdinand Dutert.

A similarly-named structure was erected for the 1878 Exposition Universelle, but the 1889 version was by far the largest vaulted building to have yet been built. It was reused for the 1900 Exposition Universelle as the Palace of Agriculture and Food (officially: Palais de l'Agriculture et des Aliments), and later used as a velodrome, agricultural exhibition hall and for other purposes and was demolished in 1910 to open up the view along the Champ de Mars.

== Construction ==
The Galerie des machines was built for the Universal Exposition of 1889 at the foot of the Champ de Mars in front of the École Militaire. The responsible engineer was Victor Contamin, assisted by the engineers Charton and Pierron. Its architect was Ferdinand Dutert, assisted by the architects Blavette, Deglane and Eugène Hénard. The structure was built by the Société des Forges de Fives-Lille and the Cail factory, and the masonry was erected by the M. Manoury company.

The Galerie des machines formed a huge glass and metal hall with an area of 115 by 420 metres (377 by 1,378 ft) and a height of 48.324 metres (158.54 ft), it was free of internal supports. The framework consisted of twenty trusses. The structure incorporated the three-pin hinged arch, developed for bridge building.

The Galerie des machines gave the exposition of 1889 an area of about 8 hectares (20 acres) of usable space. It was estimated in 1889 that the building was large enough to hold fifteen thousand horses in the ground floor and the same number of riders in the upper galleries without being crowded at all (the experiment was never made).

The largest vaulted building at the time was St Pancras railway station, built in London in 1868, with a span of 73 metres (240 ft) and height of 25 metres (82 ft). The Palais des Machines had a span of 115 metres (377 ft) and height of 45 metres (148 ft). The proportions of the structure were unfamiliar to people accustomed to heavy stone arches. The trusses were small at the base and larger higher up, and were light and narrow. The Belgian Vierendeel said, "this lack of proportion produces a bad effect; the girder is not balanced; it has no base ... it starts too low ... The eye is not reassured ... The supports of the Galerie des Machines show another fault: they are too empty."

== Usage ==
During its twenty years of existence, the Galerie des machines was used for various purposes.

During the Exposition Universelle (1900) it held the French Exhibition of Agriculture and Food, the highlight of which was a ship with red and gold sails, a full size replica of the ship Le Triomphant, created by the Menier company. Standing beside it was the Grande Roue de Paris, a Ferris wheel, one of the main attractions of the exhibition of 1900.

The Ringling Bros. and Barnum & Bailey Circus show was held in the gallery from November 30, 1901 to March 16, 1902.

From 1902, Henri Desgrange asked the architect Gaston Lambert to modify the Galerie des machines in order to create a track for cycling competitions, the auto-vélodrome d'hiver. The wooden track 333 metres (1,093 ft) across was built in 20 days. The velodrome, nicknamed "La Glacière" or the Vel d'Hiv, was inaugurated on 20 December 1903 and quickly became a popular success. In 1905 Gabriel Poulain defeated all comers.

The annual General Agricultural Competition was held there until 1908. On 20 May 1904 the newspaper Le Matin organized a military competition: the Army Walk. The Galerie des machines was transformed into a vast camp in which the competitors would rest, eat, and receive medical care. During the general strike of 1 May 1906, the troops assigned to policing the city were stationed there: six battalions of the 4th (Rennes), 47th (Saint-Malo) and 2nd (Granville) infantry regiments. There were also ten squadrons of cavalry regiments from the 6th army corps, and eight squadrons from various regiments of the 7th corps.

== Destruction ==
In 1906 the City Council voted to demolish the building while the Senate and Minister of Architecture were in favor of its retention. In 1909 the city announced the destruction of the Galerie des machines to open up the perspective of the Champ de Mars. Desgrange decided to build a new cycling temple next door, at the corner of the Boulevard de Grenelle and the rue Nélaton, the new Vel d'Hiv. The Galerie was demolished in 1910. The disappearance of the Galerie des machines dismayed the Architecture world, since the annual exhibition was the largest annual market for agricultural producers and suppliers, where all the most important business was undertaken.

The Musée d'Orsay in Paris displays a model of the Galerie des Machines at a scale of 1/200.

== Gallery ==
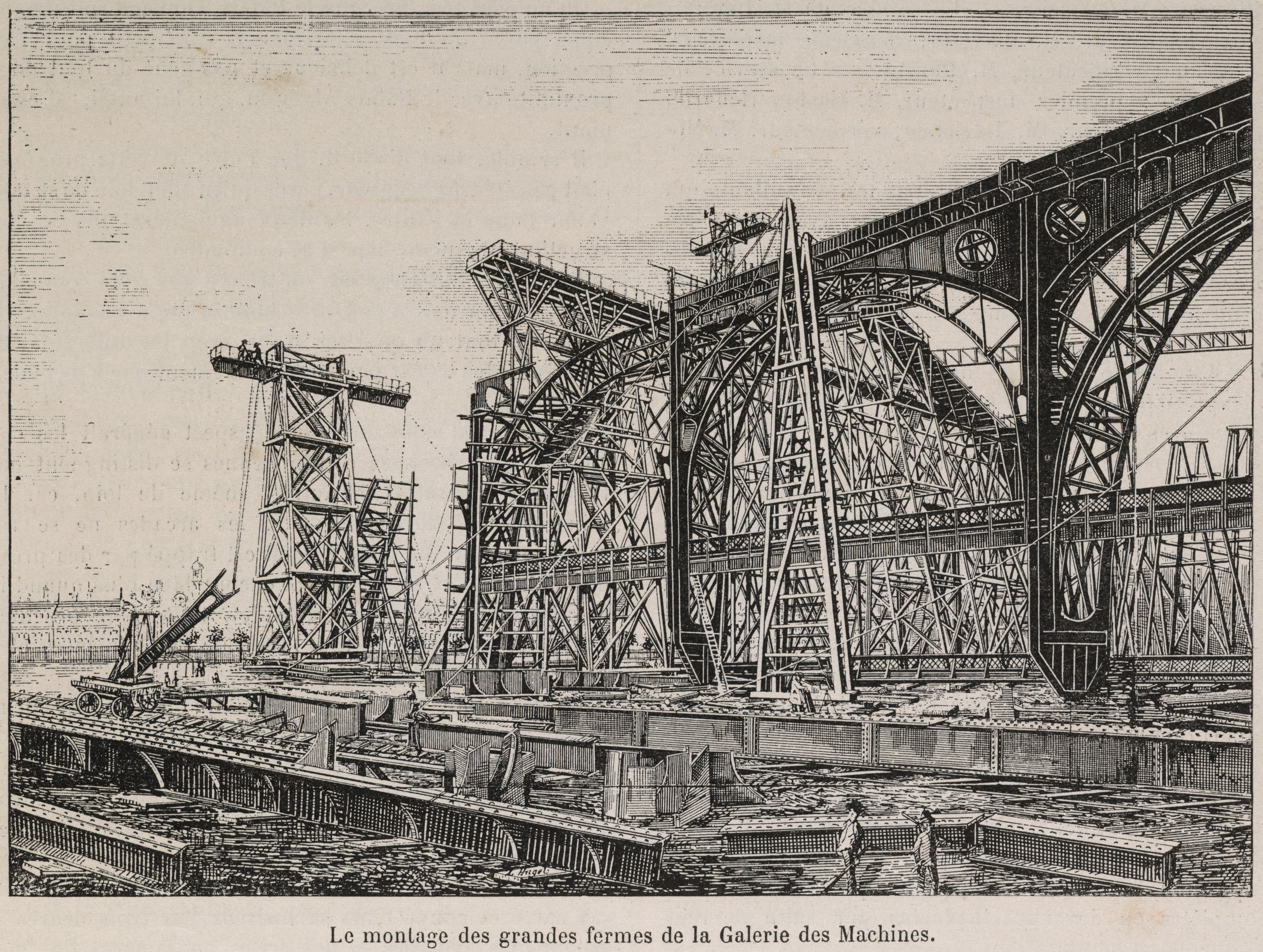
Mounting the iron beams

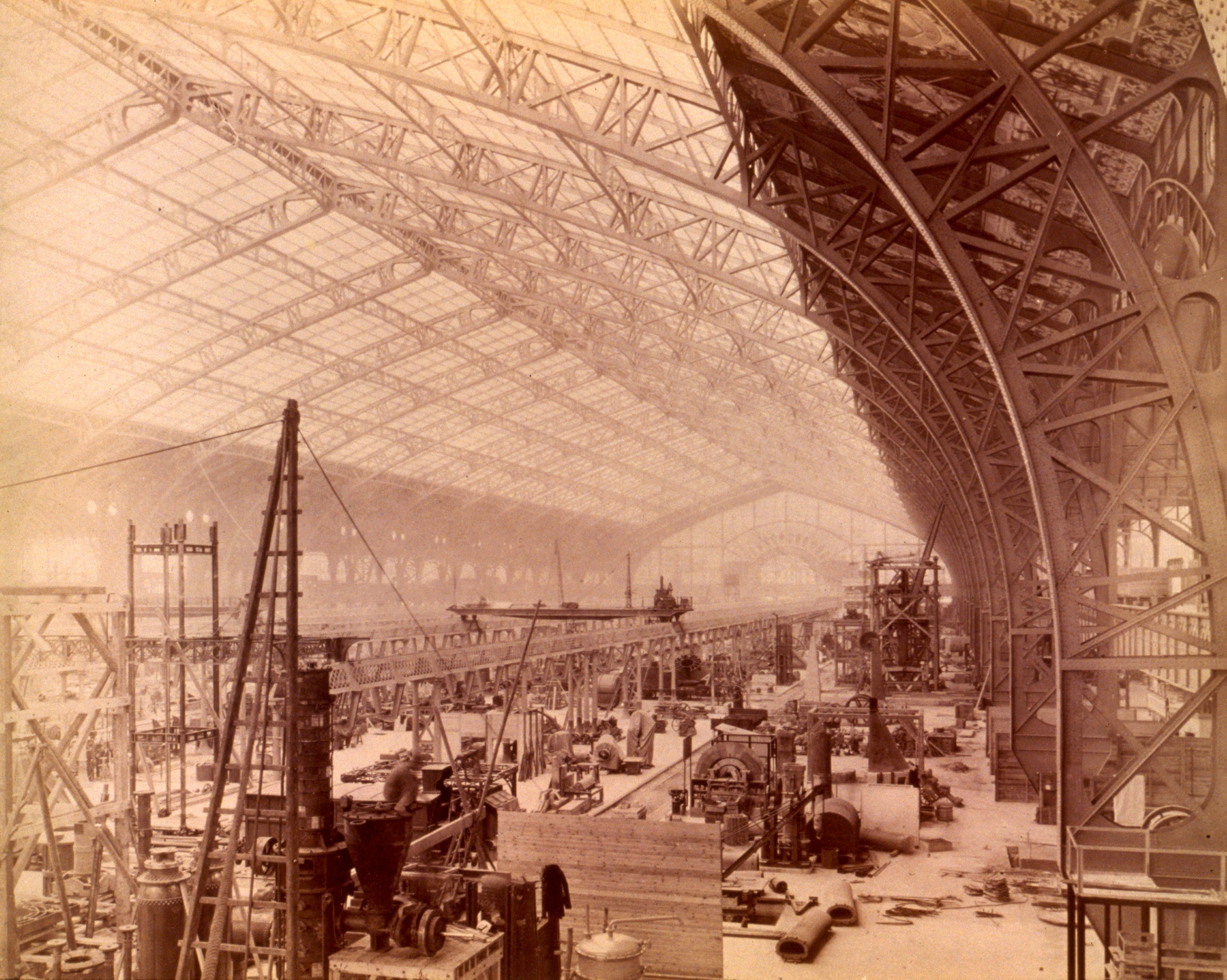
Machines being installed, 1889

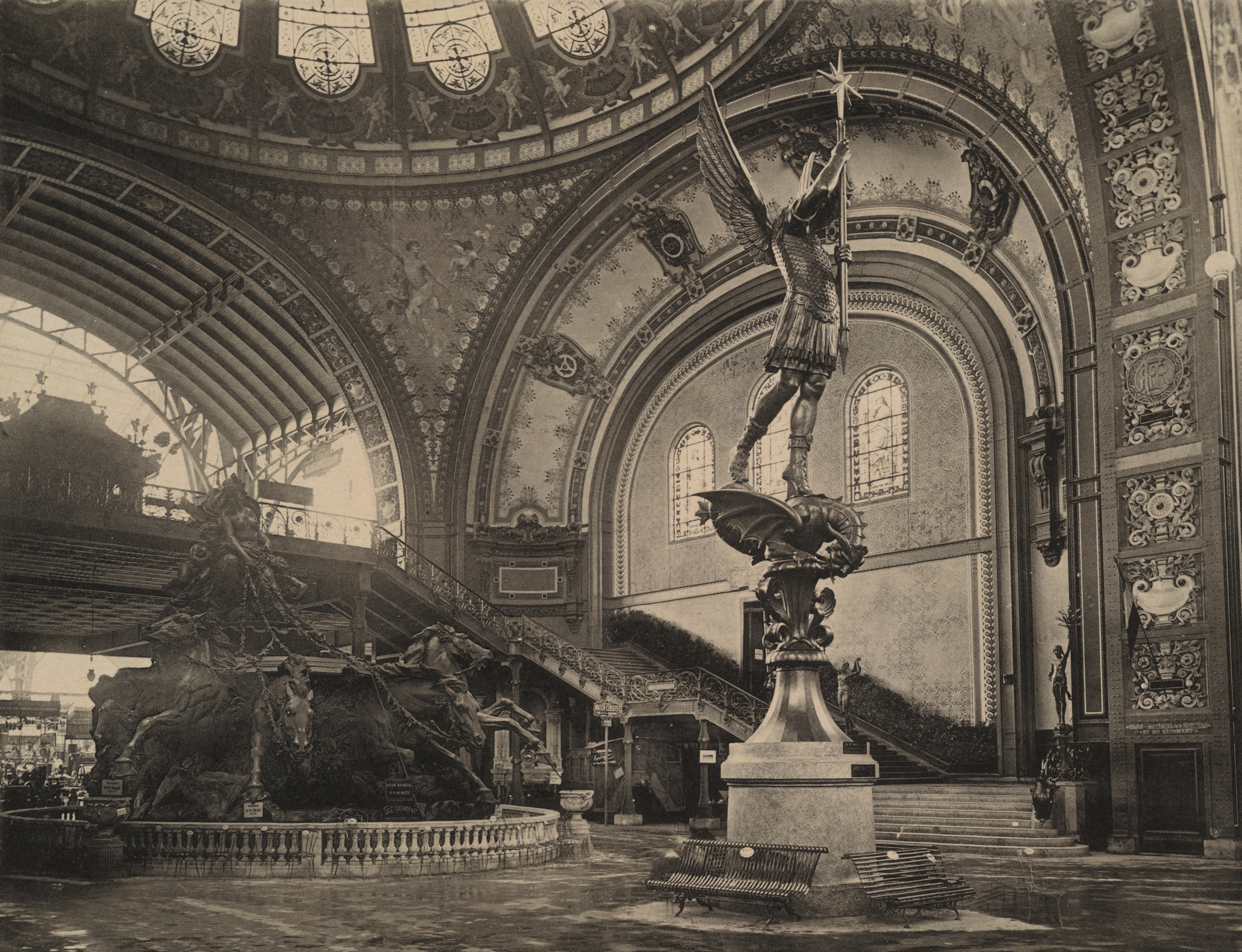
Dome located between the Palais des expositions and the Palais des machines. The staircase led to the second floor of the Palais des machines, where an inner platform was surrounding the whole building.

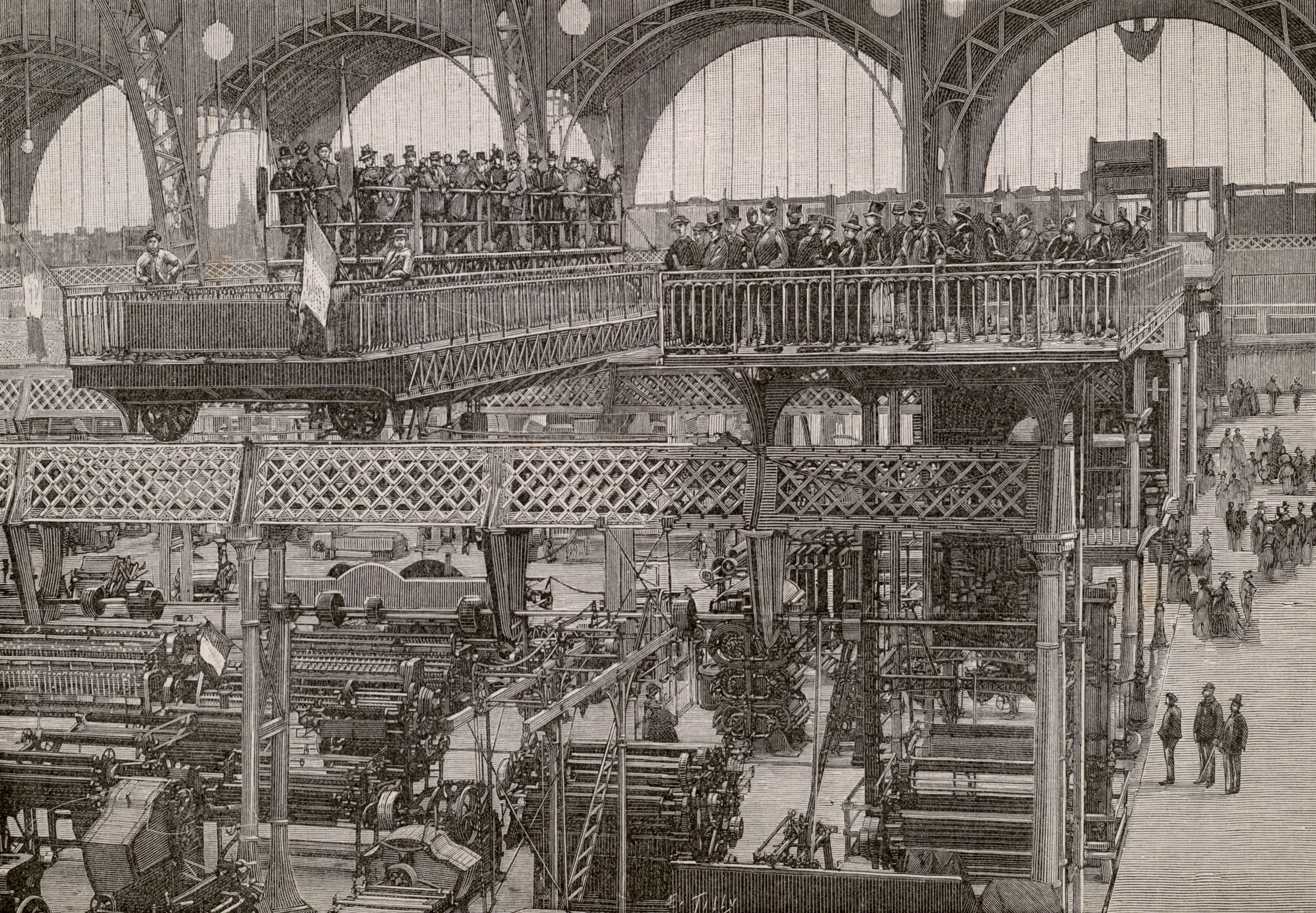
Moving bridges transporting visitors

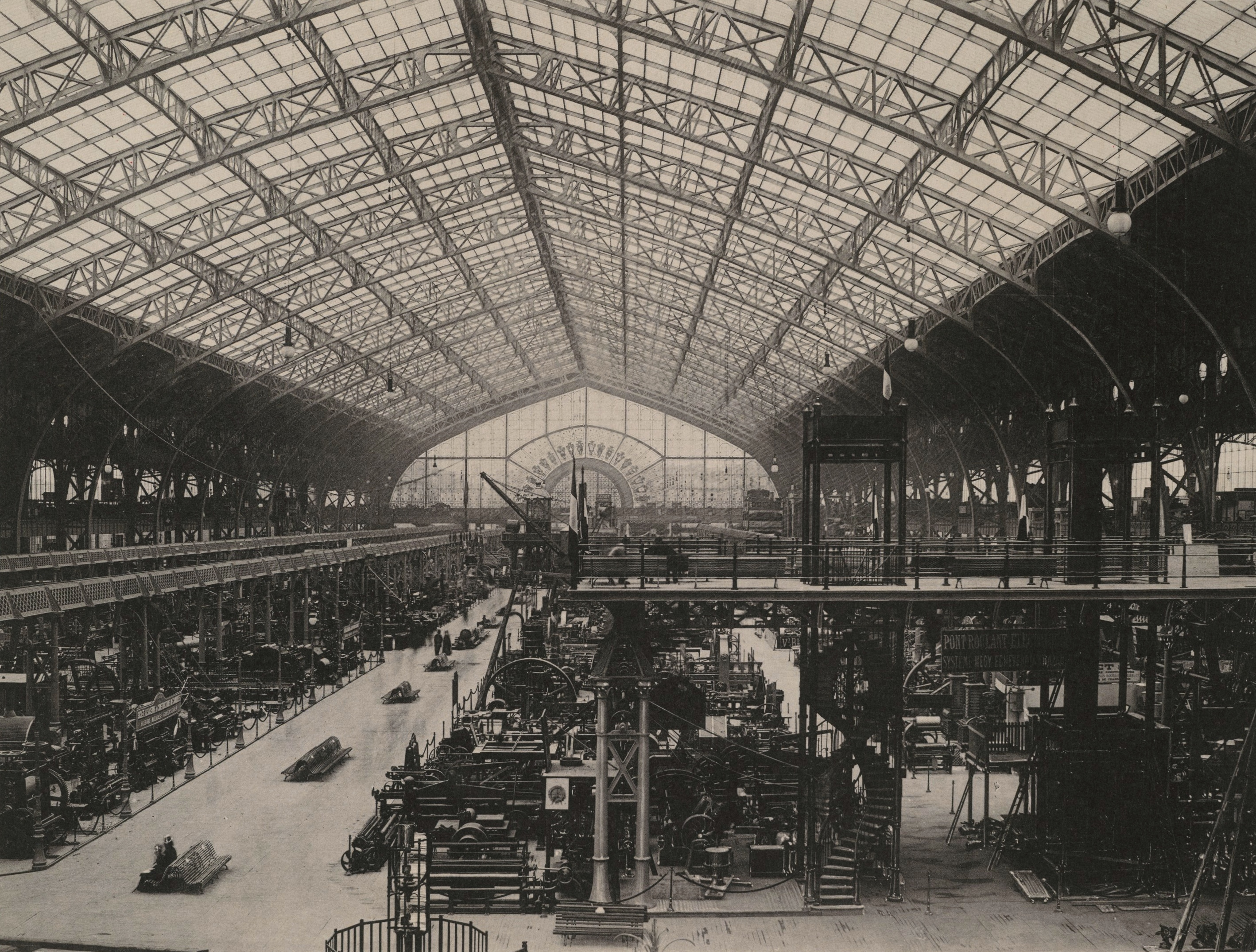
Inside view, 1889

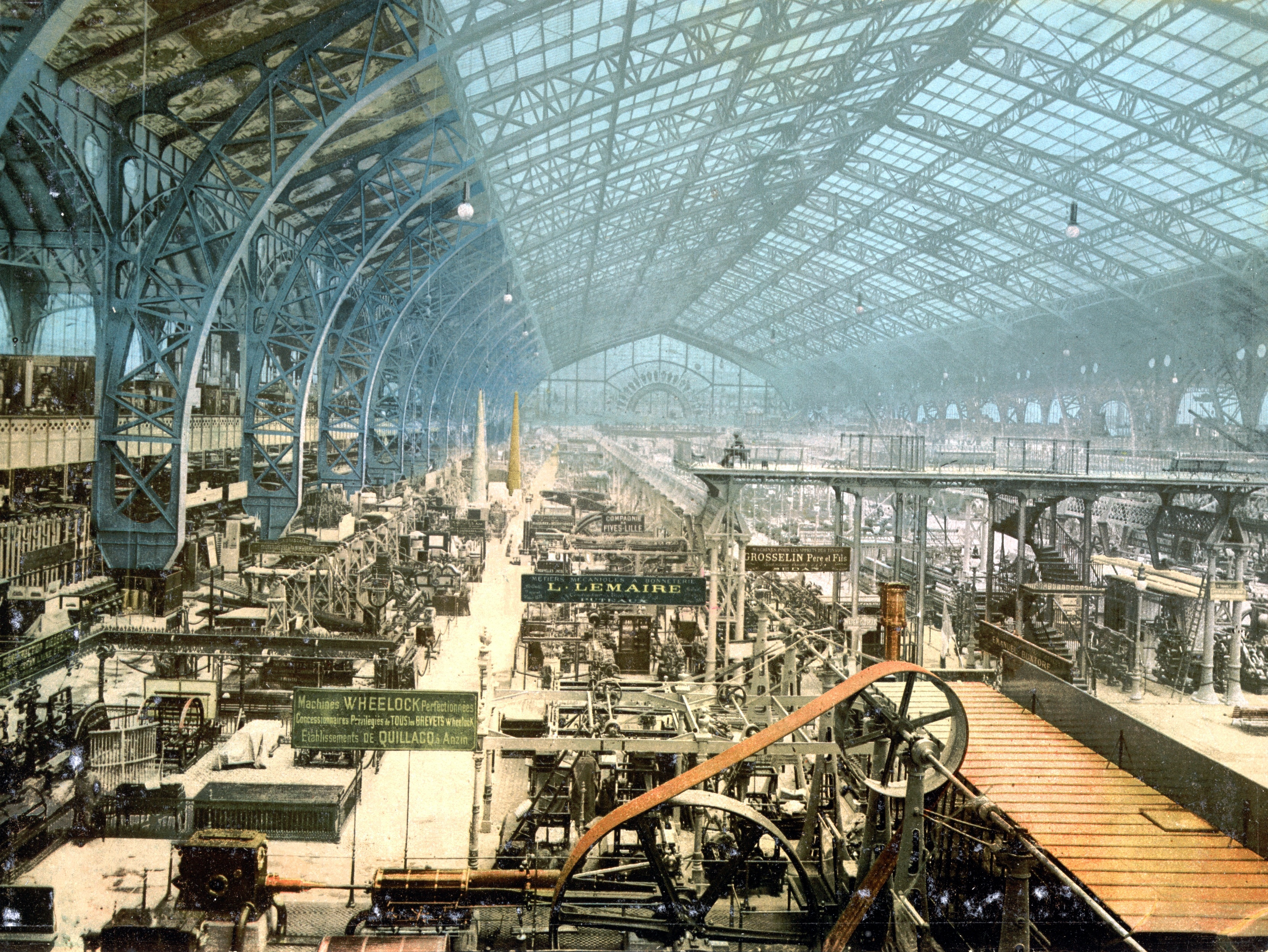
Another indoor view, 1889
