= Ferdinand Dutert =

French architect

Charles Louis Ferdinand Dutert
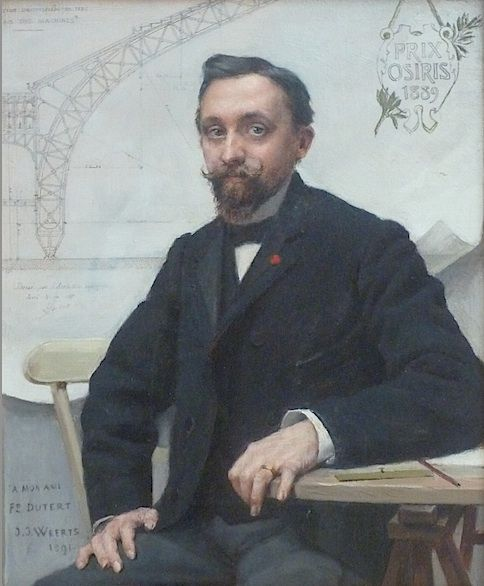
- Dutert in 1891
- Born: 21 October 1845; Douai, Hauts-de-France, France
- Died: 12 February 1906 (aged 60); Paris, Ile-de-France, France
- Occupation: Architect
- Known for: Galerie des Machines at the Paris Exposition of 1889

Charles Louis Ferdinand Dutert (21 October 1845 - 12 February 1906) was a French architect.

== Life ==
Charles Louis Ferdinand Dutert was born on 21 October 1845 in Douai, son of a merchant of that town. He was admitted to the École nationale supérieure des Beaux-Arts in 1863, and studied in the studios of Hippolyte Lebas and Léon Ginain. Entering twice for the Prix de Rome, he won the Grand Prize for Architecture in 1869 for a project called "Palace of the French embassy in the capital of a powerful state". He stayed in the Villa Medici between 1870 and 1873. Returning to France, he was active in his department of origin, but also in Paris.

Dutert was chosen as architect for the Palais des Machines at the Exposition Universelle (1889), and was fully responsible for its architectural design. He was assisted in the work by the architects Blavette, Deglane and Eugène Hénard. The great hall was 420 metres (1,380 ft) long and 115 metres (377 ft) wide, covering 4.5 hectares (11 acres). It rose to 45 metres (148 ft) in height. The engineer Victor Contamin was responsible for the technical design of the huge steel structure, including calculations to ensure the structural integrity of the immense arches. Talking of the Palais des Machines, Hénard said it successfully combined aesthetic appearance with engineering function. The two goals were complementary.

Dutert also contributed to the Exposition Universelle (1900). He died at his home at 41 Avenue Kléber in the 16th arrondissement of Paris on 12 February 1906.

== Awards ==
- Grand Prix de Rome (1869)
- 1st class Medal at the Salon of 1875
- 1st class medal at the Exposition Universelle (1878)
- Officer of the Legion of Honour in 1889

In 1891, Édouard Sain and Jean-Joseph Weerts painted his portrait in oil on canvas. That same year, Édouard Houssin made a bust that is held in the musée de la Chartreuse de Douai.

== Major works ==
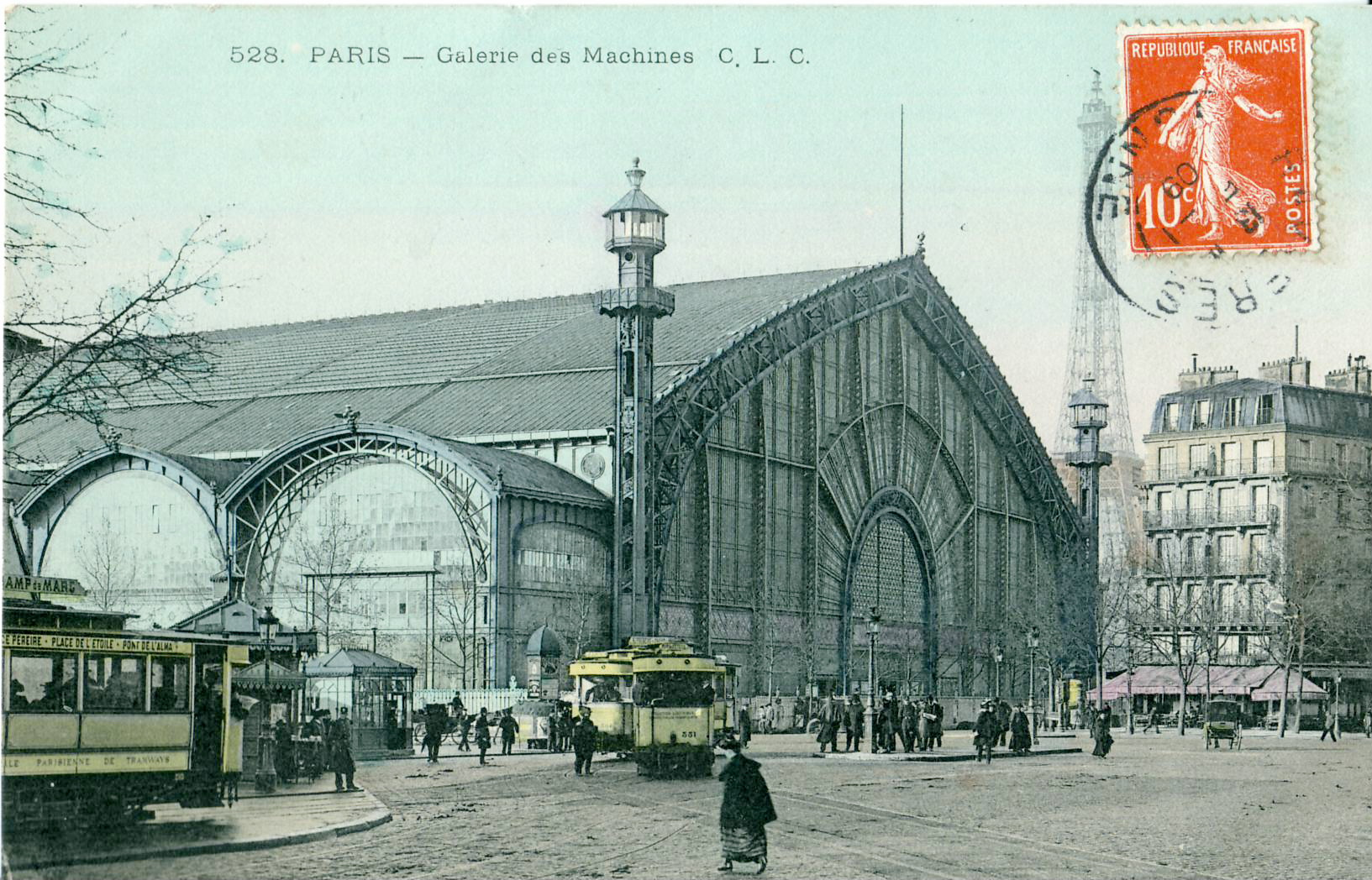
The Galerie of machines, at the start of the 20th century

- 1882 Monument of Mariette Bey at Boulogne-sur-Mer (Pas-de-Calais)
- 1884-1887: Annex to the Gatien hospital of Clocheville, now the administrative establishment of the Directorate of Health and Social Action in Boulogne-sur-Mer
- 1889 Galerie des machines at the Paris Exposition of 1889 in collaboration with the engineer Victor Contamin
- 1889: National School of Arts and textile industries in Roubaix (Nord department)
- 1893 Commemorative monument Wattignies-la-Victoire in Maubeuge (Nord department)
- 1893-1896: General Hospital of Saint-Louis, Boulogne-sur-Mer, in collaboration with the town architect Pichon (destroyed in 1988)
- 1892-1898: Gallery of Paleontology and Comparative Anatomy of the National Museum of Natural History in the 5th arrondissement of Paris, built on the occasion of the Universal Exhibition of 1900
