= Edmond Paulin =

French architect

Edmond Jean-Baptiste Paulin
- Born: 10 September 1848; Paris, France
- Died: 27 November 1915 (aged 67); Paris, France
- Occupation: Architect
- Known for: Reconstruction of the Baths of Diocletian

Edmond Jean-Baptiste Paulin (French pronunciation: [ɛdmɔ̃ ʒɑ̃ batist pɔlɛ̃]; 10 September 1848 - 27 November 1915) was a French architect. As a young man, he became known for his reconstruction of the Baths of Diocletian. Later he taught at the National School of Fine Arts, and designed pavilions for two world expositions.

== Early years ==
Edmond Jean-Baptiste Paulin was born in Paris on 10 September 1848. He entered the École nationale supérieure des Beaux-Arts (National School of Fine Arts), where he studied under Louis-Hippolyte Lebas and Léon Ginain. He made eight successive attempts to win the Prix de Rome for architecture. He won the second of two second prizes awarded in 1874 for the Grand Prix de Rome. He won the first prize in 1875 for a design for "a courthouse for Paris." His teachers were listed as Paccard, Léon Vaudoyer and Ginain.

== Rome ==
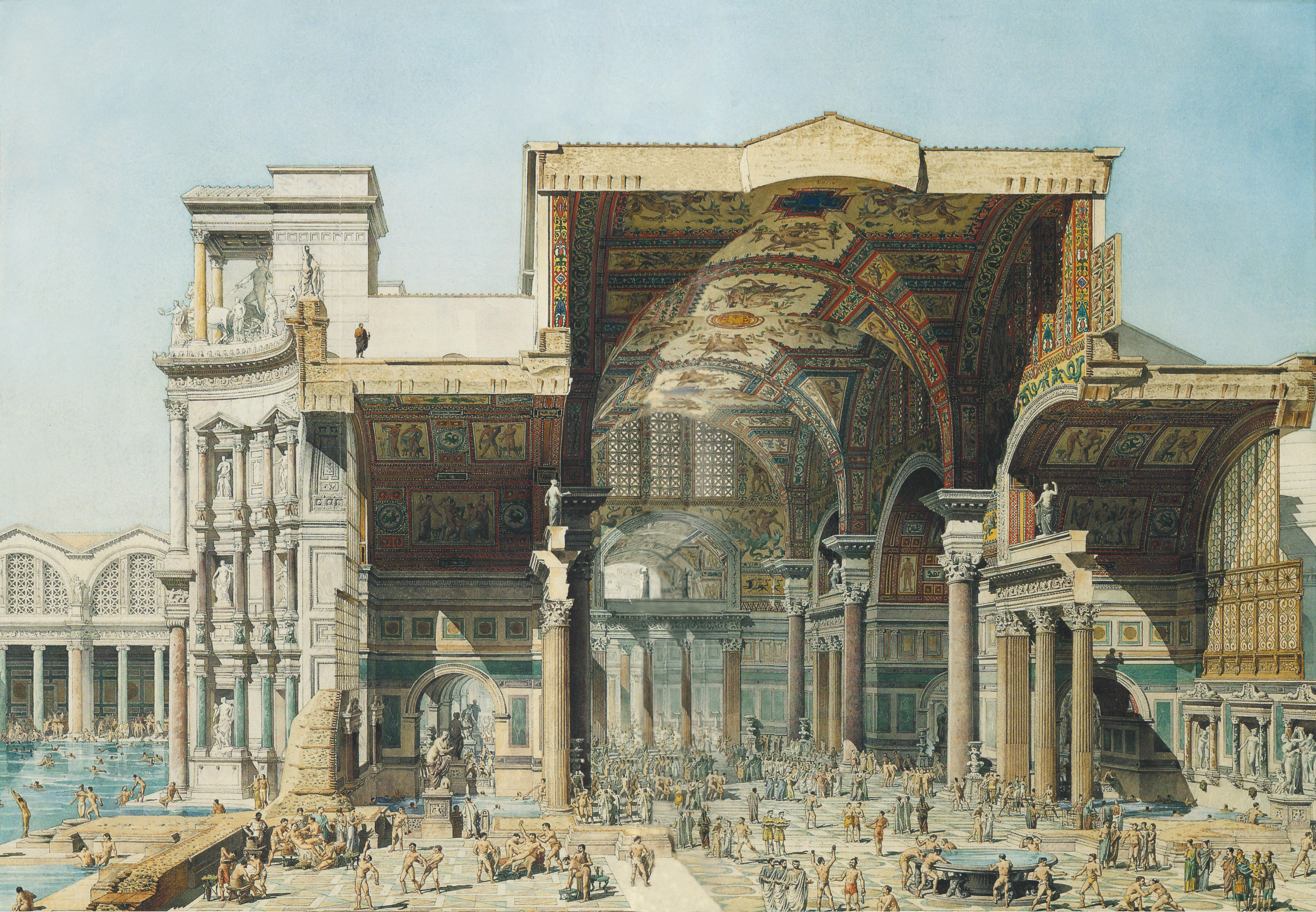
Paulin's cross-section of the Baths of Diocletian (1880)

Paulin lived in Rome at the Villa Medici from 28 January 1876 to 31 December 1879. He completed the reconstruction of the Baths of Diocletian in Rome that had been initiated by Emmanuel Brown. His drawings and plans of the ancient ruins of Rome were meticulous, particularly those of the Baths of Diocletian complex, large parts of which were being destroyed by urban renewal projects. His drawings showed the baths as they had been around 300 AD. His drawing of a cross-section of the baths illustrated the way in which the Romans used passive solar design. His work, published in 1890, influenced contemporary projects such as the design of Grand Central Station in New York.

== Later career ==
On his return to France, Paulin was appointed inspector of civil buildings. He was government architect responsible for the Ministry of Interior, the Ministry of Public Works and Les Invalides. He was also the architect of the city of Paris. In 1891 Paulin was appointed to the General Council of Civil Buildings. In 1894 he became head of a studio at the School of Fine Arts. He succeeded Julien Gaudet. In 1912 he was elected to the Academy of Fine Arts in chair 2 of the architecture department, succeeding Honoré Daumet. Paulin died on 27 November 1915 in Paris.

== Works ==
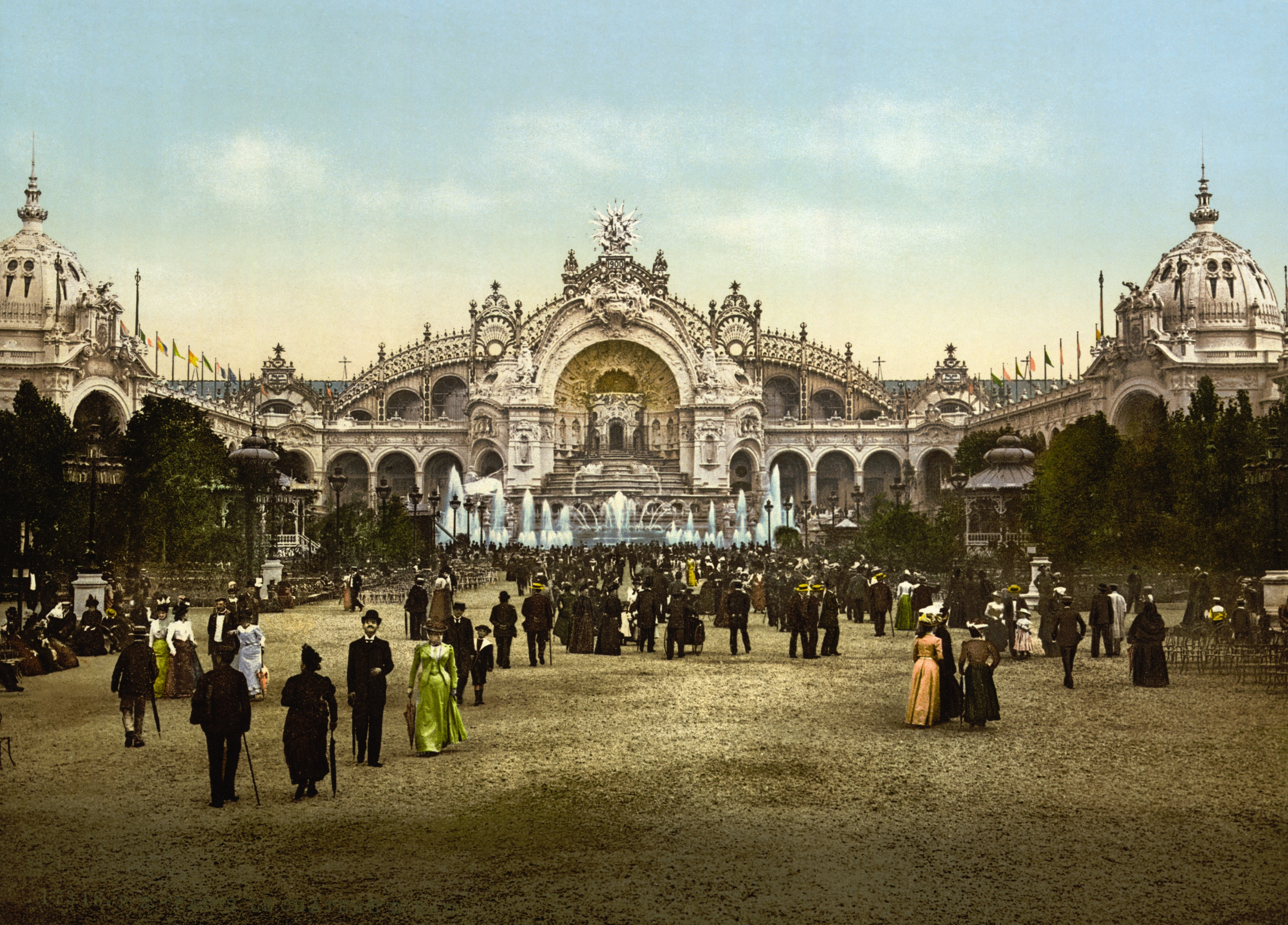
Palais de l'Électricité et château d'eau de l'exposition universelle de 1900

Paulin designed the Pavilion of Venezuela for the Exposition Universelle (1889). The pavilion was in a Spanish Renaissance revival style, with ornate sculptural decorations. It also illustrated elements of the Louis XV style that the Spanish and Jesuits introduced in many parts of South America.

Paulin was co-designer of the Palace of Electricity, Chateau of Water and Palace of Mechanical and Chemical Industries at the Exposition Universelle (1900), in collaboration with Eugène Hénard. Hénard designed the Palace of Electricity, which provided power to the other pavilions. Paulin created the huge water tower that served as its facade. It was an extraordinary structure, including a huge waterfall and crowned by a statue of the Genius of Electricity over 6 metres (20 ft) high.

Other works included:

- 1895: School groups at 101 rue de Saussure and 20 rue Jouffroy-d'Abbans in the 17th arrondissement of Paris
- 1915-1916: Commercial shop, rue d'Enghien in the 10th arrondissement of Paris
- 1915-1916: Hôtel du peintre Agage, rue Weber in the 16th arrondissement of Paris
