= Henri Deverin =

French architect and urban planner

Joseph-Henri Deverin
- Born: 1846
- Died: 1921 (aged 74–75)
- Occupation: Architect
- Known for: Proposed reconstruction of the Palais-Royal

Joseph-Henri Deverin (1846-1921) was a French architect and urban planner. He was the chief architect of historic monuments.

== Life ==
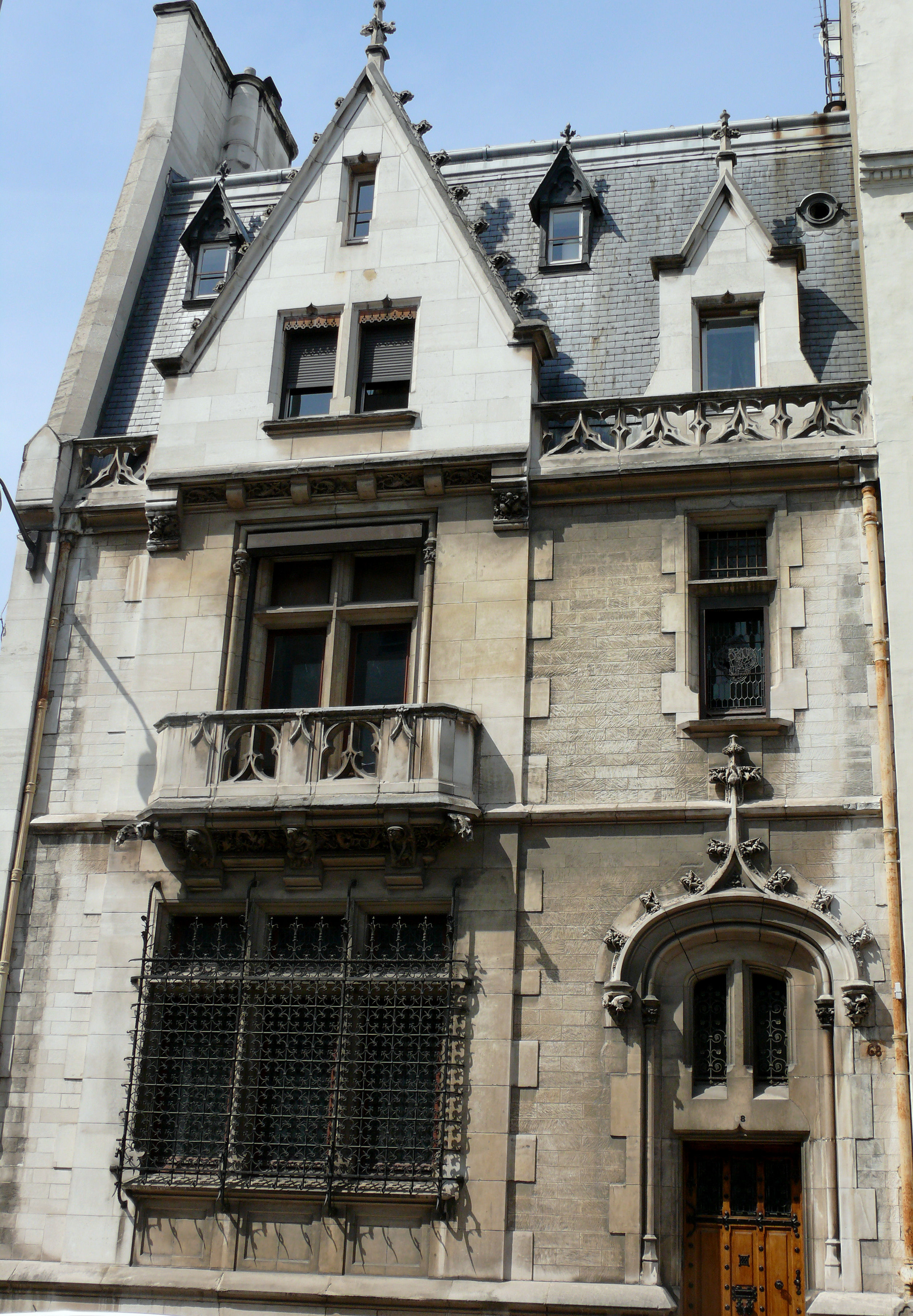
Paris 17th arrondissement - Hôtel particulier 68 rue Ampère

Joseph-Henri Deverin was born in 1846. In 1865 he was admitted to the École des Beaux-Arts. He studied under Daumet and de Lisch. He built some townhouses in Paris. The townhouse at 68 rue Ampère, which he designed and the engineer Weyher built around 1880, has been registered as a historic monument. It has a neo-Gothic facade and interior, and is one of the last of the tall buildings in the rue Ampère from the 19th century.

In 1877 Deverin joined the Department of Historic Monuments, and in 1897 became a departmental chief architect. He worked in the departments of Vienne, Deux-Sèvres and Vendée (1897-1917) and in Loire-Atlantique (1898). His main works were Porte Saint-Jacques, Parthenay and the churches of Saint-Jouin-de-Marnes, Airvault and Oiron in Deux-Sèvres. He also restored several buildings in Vienne and Loire-Inférieure after the Department of Historic Monuments was reorganized in 1897.

Deverin retired in 1919 and died in 1921.

== Proposals ==
The Palais-Royal ward had become stagnant after the depression of the 1880s, visited by few tourists. In 1900 a major fire destroyed the Comédie-Française. The Palais-Royal was destroyed and then restored for the twentieth time. To bring the ward back to life, Deverin proposed to extend the Rue Vivienne through the palace to intersect the Rue de Rivoli in front of the Conseil d'Etat. (Note: Eugène Hénard also wanted to bring traffic through the Palais-Royal, making it the location of the intersection of two major new avenues.)

Deverin also wanted to change the buildings and build extensions incorporating the style of Napoleon III's Louvre expansion. This project, which would have harmonized the architecture of the Palais-Royal with that of Hector Lefuel in the Louvre, was ultimately not carried out.

Henri Deverin also proposed to implement a statue representing the city of Paris behind the apse of Notre Dame de Paris. (Note: The Ile-de-France square was built at this location, under which the crypt of the Deportees was dug.) This project was also rejected.

== Gallery ==
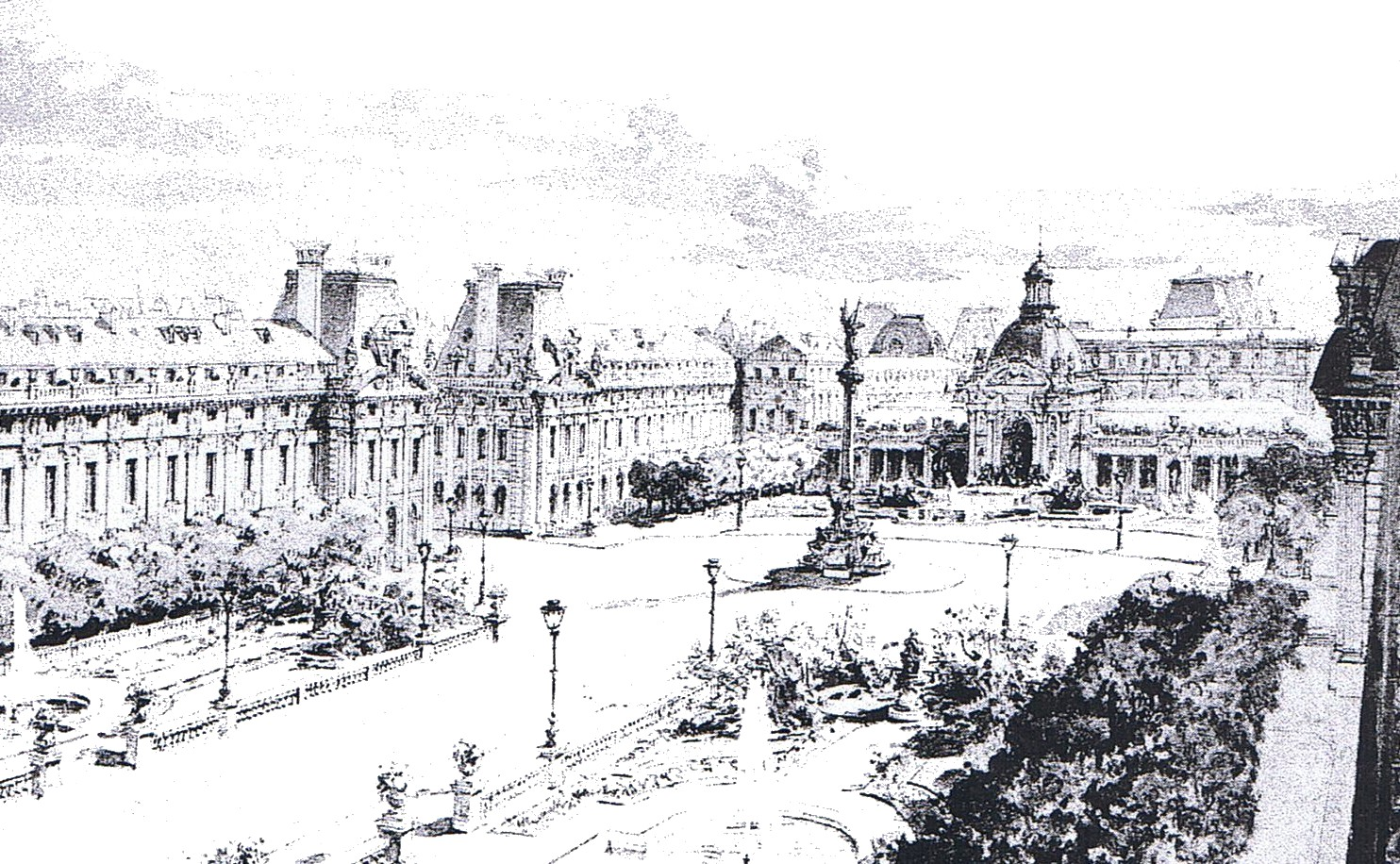
Project for reconstruction of the Palais-Royal by Henri Deverin.

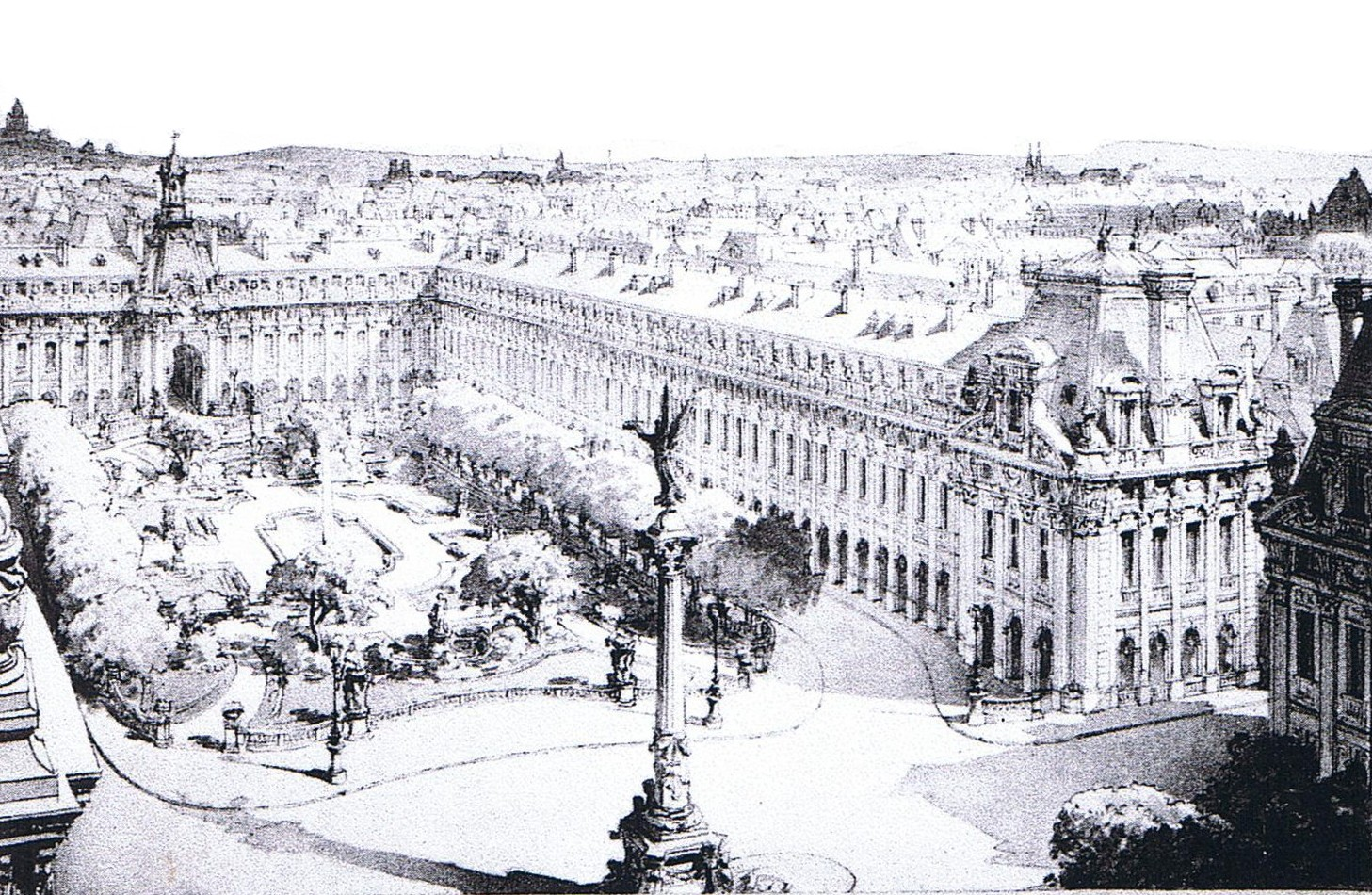
Another project for reconstruction of the Palais-Royal by Henri Deverin.

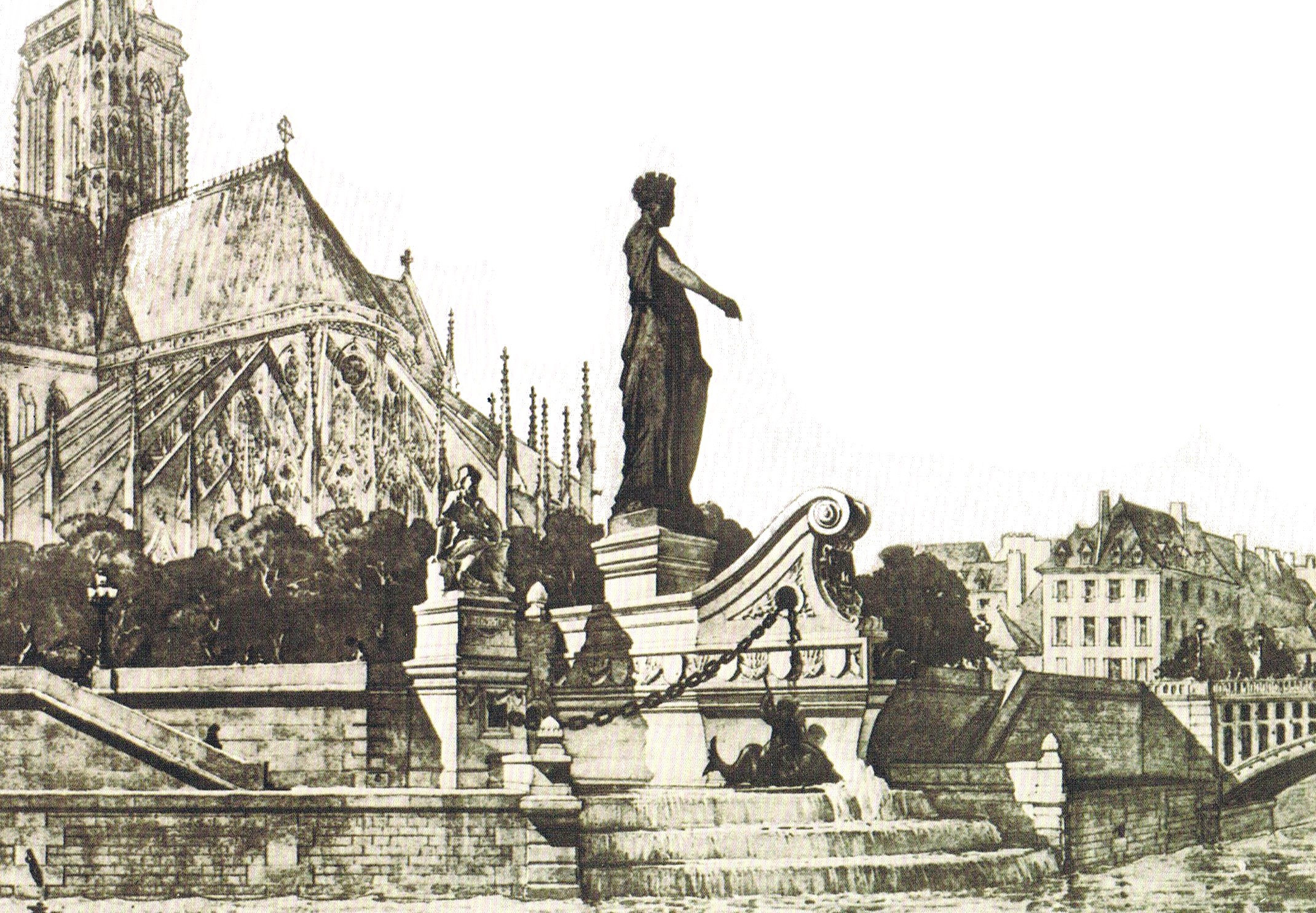
Project for a monument representing the city of Paris behind Notre-Dame-de-Paris.

== Bibliography ==
- Deverin, Henri (1891). L'Art kmer, conférence faite le 18 avril 1891 à l'Union syndicale des architectes français, par Henri Deverin,... impr. de E. de Soye et fils.
- Deverin, Henri (1895). Reves & réminiscences d'architecture pittoresque France & Italie. Aulanier & Cie. Editeurs.
- Deverin, Henri (1902). L'Hôtel de ville au Château de Nantes, notice et dessins: par Henri Deverin,... A. Dugas.
- Deverin, Henri (1905). La Résurrection du Palais-Royal. Exposé d'un projet (1896-1905) présenté par Henri Deverin,... impr. Humbert-Droz.
- Deverin, Henri; Daumet, Honoré (1910). Petite histoire d'un atelier, 1862-1911: accompagnée d'une lettre autographe de Monsieur Daumet. Association amicale Atelier Daumet.
- Deverin, Henri (1910). Esquisse d'un monument funéraire et triomphal à ériger à la gloire des aviateurs: notice et dessins. Moreau frères.
- Deverin, Henri (1911). 100 plans types de constructions urbaines pour l'utilisation de terrains variés: avec avertissement explicatif. Librairie générale de l'architecture et des arts décoratifs, Ch. Massin, éditeur.
