= Eugène Hénard =

French architect

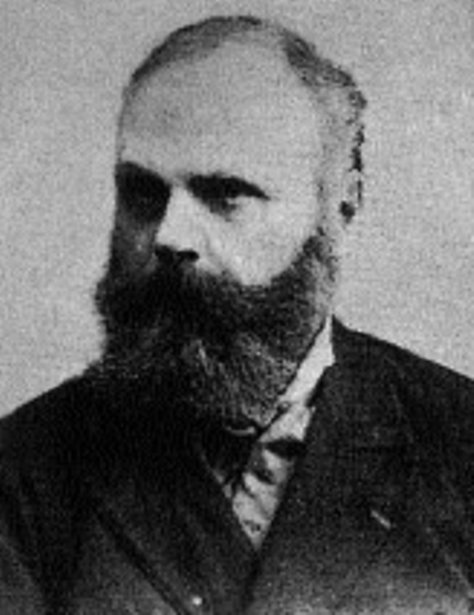
- Born: Eugène Alfred Hénard; 22 October 1849; Paris, France
- Died: February 19, 1923 (aged 73); Paris, France
- Occupation: Architect
- Known for: Roundabouts, stepped boulevards, artificial ground level

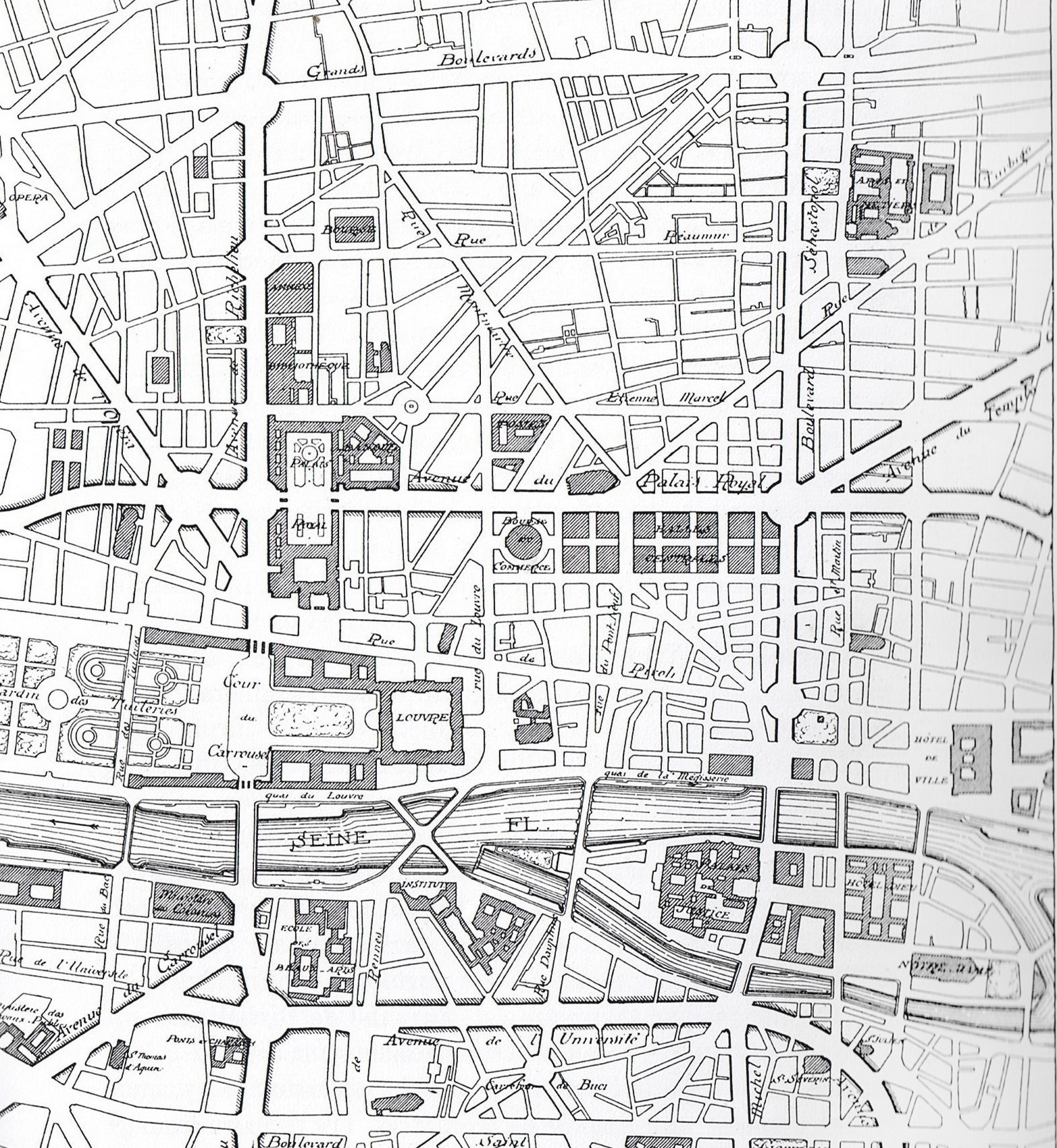
Plan for great crossroads in Paris

Eugène Alfred Hénard (French pronunciation: [øʒɛn alfʁɛd enaʁ]; 22 October 1849 – 19 February 1923) was a French architect and a highly influential urban planner. He was a pioneer of roundabouts, which were first introduced in Paris in 1907.

Hénard advocated several major urban projects in Paris, including great radial roads linking the center to a new ring road, and the expansion of the Place de l'Opéra. He was also a strong supporter of increased green space in cities. He proposed an innovative "stepped boulevard" arrangement, where buildings would be set at an angle to the line of the street, thus maximizing light into the apartments. His futuristic visions strongly influenced later architects, notably Le Corbusier.

== Life ==
=== Early years ===
Eugène Hénard was born in 1849. His father, Antoine-Julien Hénard, was a professor of architecture at the École des Beaux-Arts, known as the "architect of the 12th" for his work in the 12th arrondissement of Paris. Eugène Hénard studied architecture under his father at the École des Beaux-Arts. He proved to be an able student and won several prizes. Eugène Hénard did not win the Grand Prix de Rome, but qualified as an architect in 1880. In 1882 Hénard obtained a position with the Travaux de Paris, the office of public works, remaining with this department for his working life. At first his main responsibility was the design of school buildings.

=== Engineer and architect ===
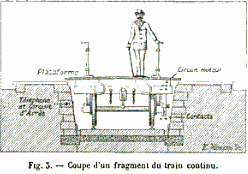
Cross-section of Hénard's proposed moving sidewalk for the 1889 exposition.

During the planning for the Exposition Universelle (1889) Hénard proposed installing an innovative continuous train system to move visitors around, reducing fatigue and improving flow. The continuous train, or moving sidewalk, would have been powered by electricity. His design had a series of 320 wagons forming a continuous loop with a length of 2,080 metres (6,820 ft). They would run through the exposition on rails in a trench. Each wagon would be covered with a wooden floor at ground level, and would move relatively slowly. Young and agile passengers could jump on or off at any point. The train would frequently come to a halt for the convenience of women, children and older passengers.

The moving sidewalk project was rejected, but Hénard was assigned as a sub-inspector to help oversee construction of the huge Palais des Machines. He was one of the assistants of Ferdinand Dutert, who designed the building. The largest vaulted building at the time was St Pancras railway station, built in London in 1868, with a span of 73 metres (240 ft) and height of 25 metres (82 ft). The Palais des Machines had a span of 115 metres (377 ft) and height of 45 metres (148 ft). Talking of the structure, Hénard said it successfully combined aesthetic appearance with engineering function. The two goals were complementary. The pavilion was reused for the 1900 exposition, but was dismantled in 1910 despite Hénard plea to preserve it as an architectural monument.

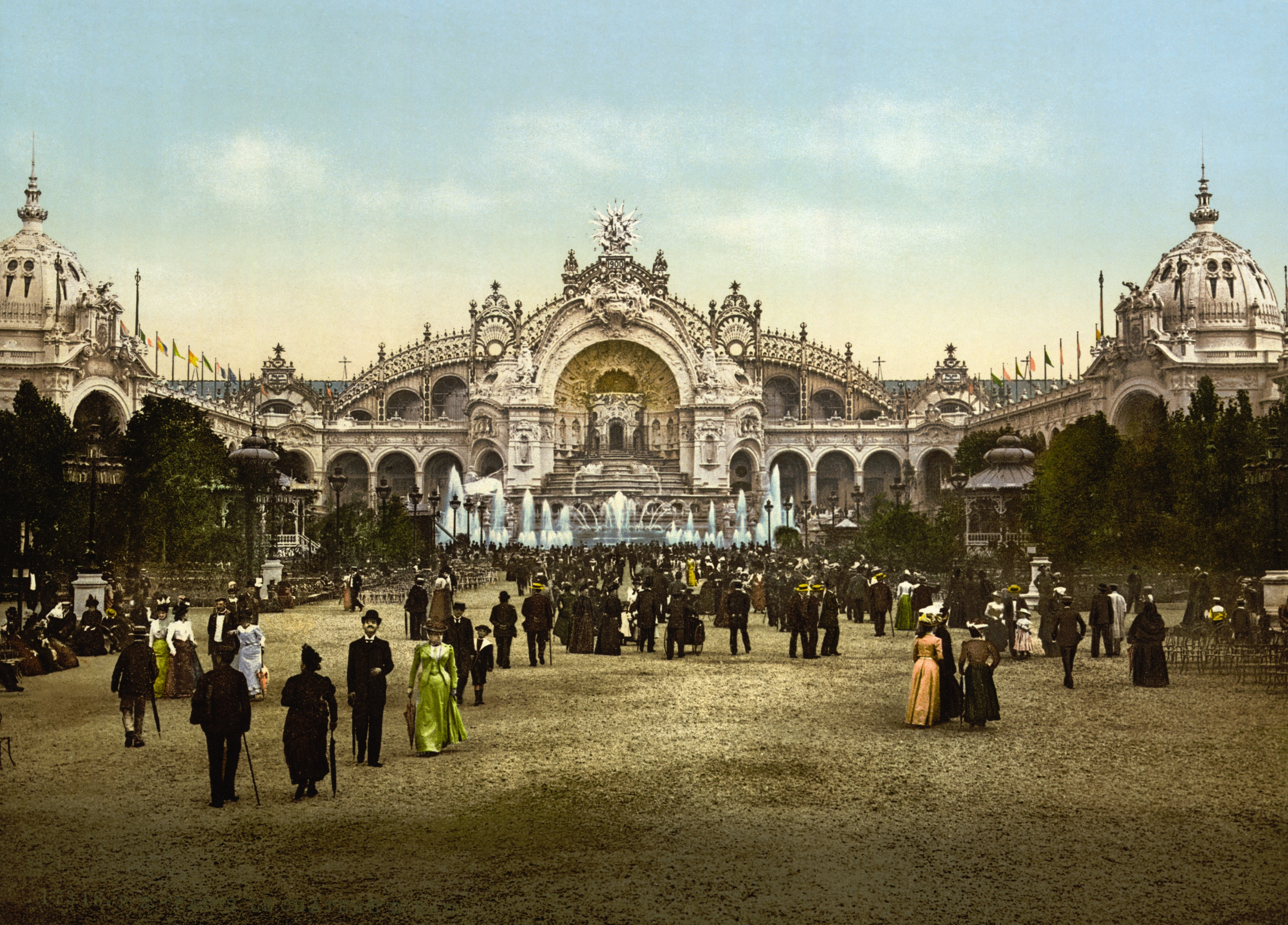
Chateau d'Eau and Palais de l'Electricité from the Champ de Mars

In 1889 Hénard became a member of the prestigious Societé Centrale des Architectes, and was confirmed as sub-inspector of the municipality of Paris. In 1896 Hénard was named assistant director of architectural services to the Exposition Universelle (1900), and in 1897 was detached from his responsibilities to the city. Hénard designed the Palace of Electricity for the exposition, at the end of the Champ de Mars facing the Eiffel Tower. This iron and glass pavilion was the highlight of the Exposition, and also provided power to all the other pavilions. Edmond Paulin created the huge water tower that served as its facade, an extraordinary structure including a huge waterfall and crowned by a statue of the Genius of Electricity over 6 metres (20 ft) high.

Hénard also designed the Hall of Illusions, a hexagonal structure with a Moorish appearance where the interior walls were covered in mirrors. The giant kaleidoscope created for this hall is now preserved in the Passage Jouffroy. For his work on the 1900 exposition Hénard received a gold medal in architecture and was made a knight of the Legion of Honour.

=== Urban planner ===
In 1901 Hénard returned to working for the city as an inspector. In 1907 he was appointed architect of the 8th section of the city, comprising the 9th and 17th arrondissements. Between 1901 and 1913 he was responsible for various public works projects in these arrondissements. He directed the commission on Monumental Perspectives from 1910 to 1911, and was made a member of the Council of Civil Buildings.

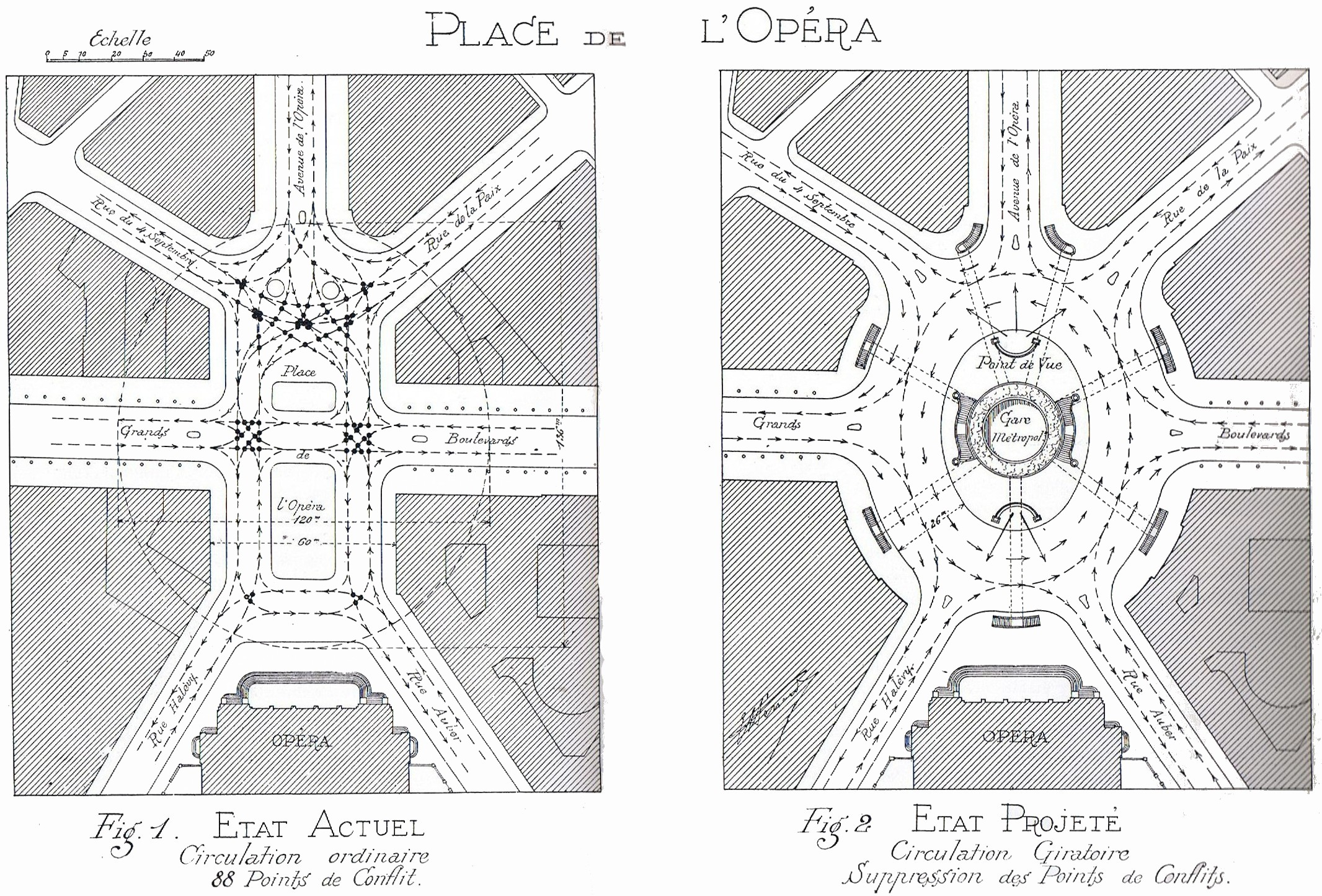
Detailed plan for transforming the place de l'Opéra into a carrefour à girations (roundabout)

Hénard also worked with various organizations concerned with health, philanthropy or professional services as an expert on urban planning considerations. In 1908 he headed one of two committees of the Musee Social. His committee was responsible for identifying urban and rural hygiene problems and proposing solutions, while the other committee was to draft legislation and find legal methods for implementing his group's proposals. In November 1911 Henri Prost was assigned to assist him, since he was in poor health. Prost went on to have a distinguished career in urban planning. In 1913 Hénard was one of the founders of the French society of urban architects, which would become the Société française des urbanistes (SFU). Hénard was the first president.

Hénard called for a law that would require urban planning for all cities in France with more than 10,000 people. He became internationally recognized for the series of articles on aspects of urban plans for Paris that he published between 1903 and 1908, including plans to use the former fortifications land for parks and a ring road around Paris, the grande Ceínture. The sixth paper, issued in March 1905, discussed the growth of automobile traffic and the need for radial arteries. The seventh, issued in May 1906, discussed intersections such as roundabouts. Among other innovations he proposed in his Études sur les transformations de Paris were multi-level crossroads, train tracks and metro lines and elevators.

Hénard was preoccupied with finding solutions to the growing traffic problem in Paris, and devoted much of his career to this subject. He prepared many studies and plans for improving the road system in Paris while preserving important buildings and monuments. Hénard wanted to develop better radial thoroughfares, and to take the opportunity presented by demolition of the old city fortifications to build a ring road and new parks and housing. The new housing units would have a staggered arrangement so as to maximize the light received by each apartment and to create more recreational space. He received strong support from organizations such as the Musée Social, and from other urban planners, but was opposed by real estate investors who feared the impact of his planned 75,000 apartment units. After World War I (1914–1918) most of the fortifications area that was to be used for his projects was instead sold in independent parcels to various developers.

Eugène Hénard died in 1923.

== Innovations ==
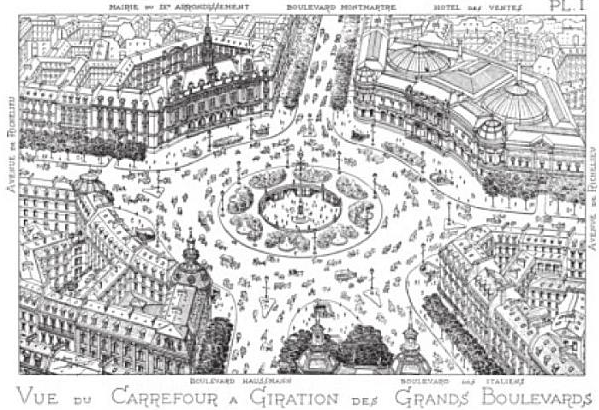
Illustration of a Carrefour à Giration from one of Hénard's transformation proposals. Note that most of the vehicles are still horse-drawn.

=== Statistical study of traffic flow ===
By 1906 there was estimated to be 65,543 vehicles on the streets of Paris. Hénard was a pioneer in traffic studies, breaking down counts of vehicles by type (e.g. household, professional, commercial, etc.) and deriving traffic statistics for each type as the day progressed. Hénard compared Paris to London, Berlin and Moscow, cities that had fewer traffic problems, and concluded that the reason was that the other cities had radial arteries connected to ring roads, which Paris lacked. His diagrams of major cities in Europe where their patterns of radial and ring roads were emphasized were used to support urban plans in the United States, such as those prepared for San Francisco and Chicago by Daniel Burnham.

=== Improved intersections ===
Hénard proposed various solutions to the problem of efficient traffic flow through road intersections, including a form of cloverleaf interchange. In 1905 Hénard proposed the rule that at busy intersections the vehicles on the right had the right of way. Experiments with this rule were started in 1907, and it was included in the first official traffic regulations published in 1912. The rule stands today. He designed a split-level intersection, in which pedestrians were separated from traffic.

Traffic circles, often with a civic monument in the center, have a long history. Until the growing traffic volume of the twentieth century forced the issue, there was no standard rule for moving round them. In 1897 Holroyd Smith in London proposed a "gyratory" traffic flow, with traffic going round the circle in a defined direction. Hénard proposed the same in Paris in 1903. Hénard called them carrefours à girations. The first test of the concept was with New York's Columbus Circle, completed in 1905. In 1907 the concept was introduced in Paris in the Place de l'Étoile and Place de la Nation. Roundabouts were introduced in Britain and Germany soon after, and became more common in those countries than in France.

=== Stepped housing ===
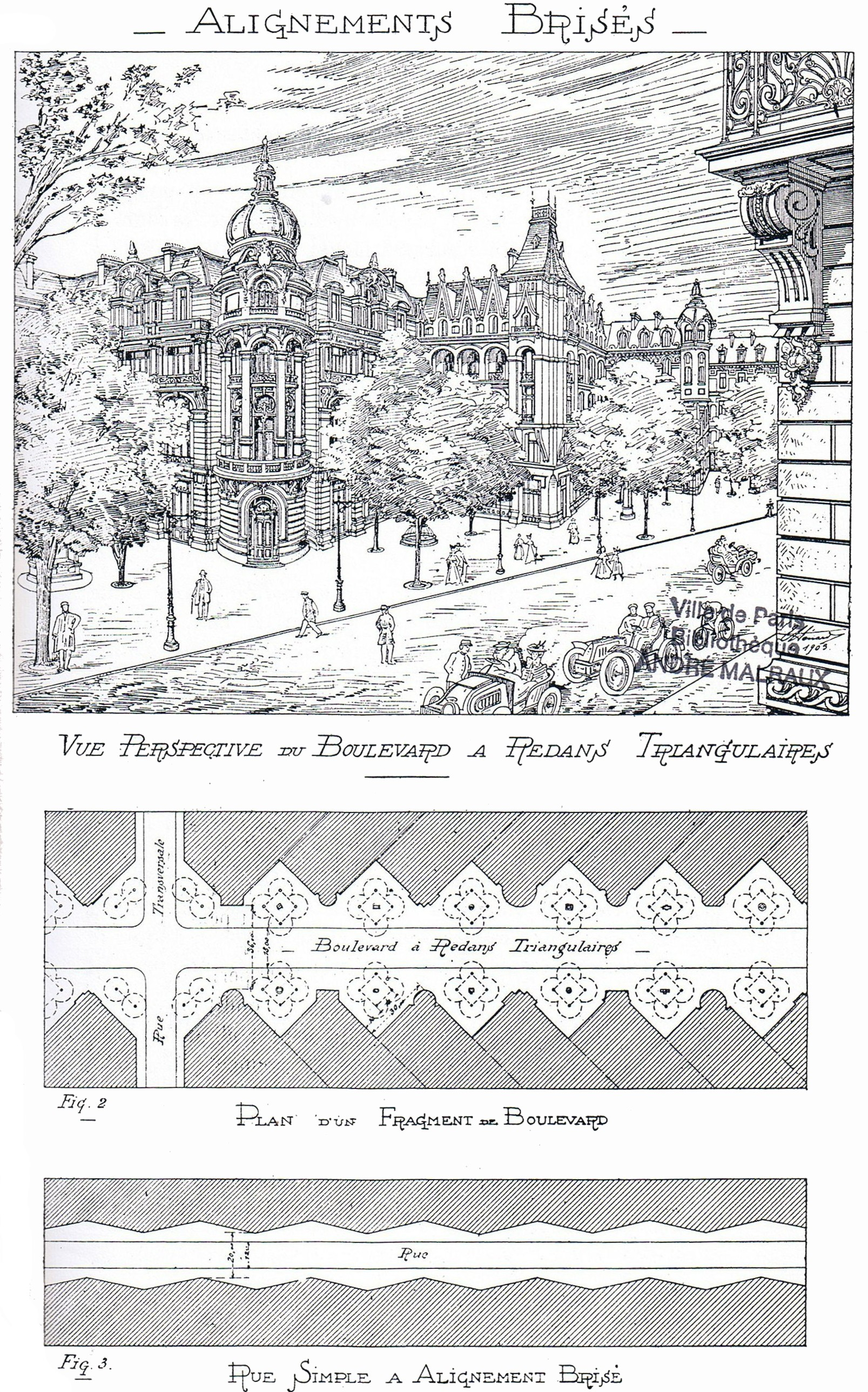
Sample stepped boulevard design

In urban planning, Eugène Hénard was attached to the idea of combining solutions to practical requirements, particularly those arising from the development of motoring, with aesthetic objectives. He said, "It is unfortunate that on the pretext of hygiene and good administration, we forget our past as an artistic people; it is unacceptable that we cannot in our turn create new forms in which, without sacrificing the conditions of scientific progress, the approval of the people and the aspects of beauty also have their share."

In the traditional view of sanitation inherited by Baron Haussmann, it was thought that wide, straight tree-lined boulevards cutting through the city would reduce the danger of epidemics by letting healthy air circulate freely. After the discovery of bacteria, there was no longer seen to be a need for uniform, flat facades along streets to maximize air circulation, although fresh air, sunlight and good sewers were still important. Hénard said that for a public road to provide all the services that heavy traffic is entitled to require, it is necessary that the paved road is properly aligned and that its width is uniform, but this does not imply rigorous alignment of buildings.

Hénard therefore proposed to replace the monotonous lines of house facades and trees parallel to the road with a "stepped boulevard" (boulevard à redans). In one version, the fronts of the buildings would be at angles to the road and to each other, creating triangular spaces in which trees could be planted. In an alternate arrangement, blocks of trees would alternate with apartment blocks along the road, with the apartment blocks connected further back from the road, thus creating a series of square green spaces along the boulevard. The stepped arrangement would provide a greater amount of light and would provide space for small green spaces between the road and the buildings, or for shops and cafes. Hénard considered that the result would give greater freedom to architects. These concepts influenced the pattern of the linear superblocks in Le Corbusier's famous 1922 Ville Contemporaine proposal.

=== City of the Future ===
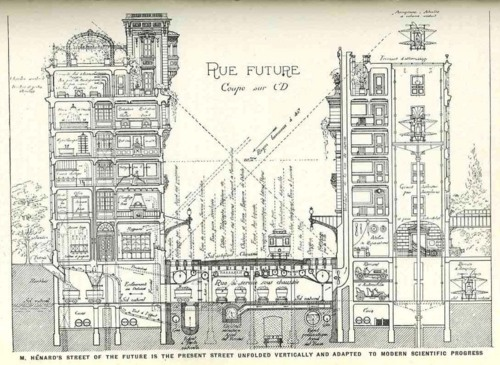
Illustration of Hénard's "street of the future", published in American City in January 1911

Hénard presented a paper at a conference in 1910 in London on the "City of the Future" that gave a visionary, futurist outline of a high-technology designed city in which the use of private aircraft was widespread. Although they were Utopian at the time, many (but not all) of his suggestions later turned into reality. His streets included conduits for gas, electricity, compressed air, drinking water, pneumatic tubes for letters, telephone lines and so on. There were bathrooms with hot and cold water on every floor. Vacuum powered wall conduits would remove smoky or polluted air from the apartments. Garbage would be thrown down tubes into bins below grade, and service carts would carry it away on rails below the street.

Hénard was the first to propose the concept of an artificial ground level, which influenced later urban architects such as Auguste Perret and Le Corbusier. He envisioned a "service road" running below the road used by the residents of his magnificent buildings, with their elevators, roof gardens and rooftop helicopter landing pads. (Note: Hénard was already speculating about helicopters and their impact on urban design in 1910, even though no working machine had yet been built.) Concepts presented in Le Corbusier's 1915 work on "Pilotis-Cities", where buildings would stand on stilts to increase the space available for traffic flow, derive from Hénard's 1910 work. However, Hénard presented his innovations within the framework of the contemporary Parisian fin-de-siècle decorative style, while Le Corbusier thought a new urban form would better meet the needs of the new age.

== Paris urban plans ==
=== Major thoroughfares ===
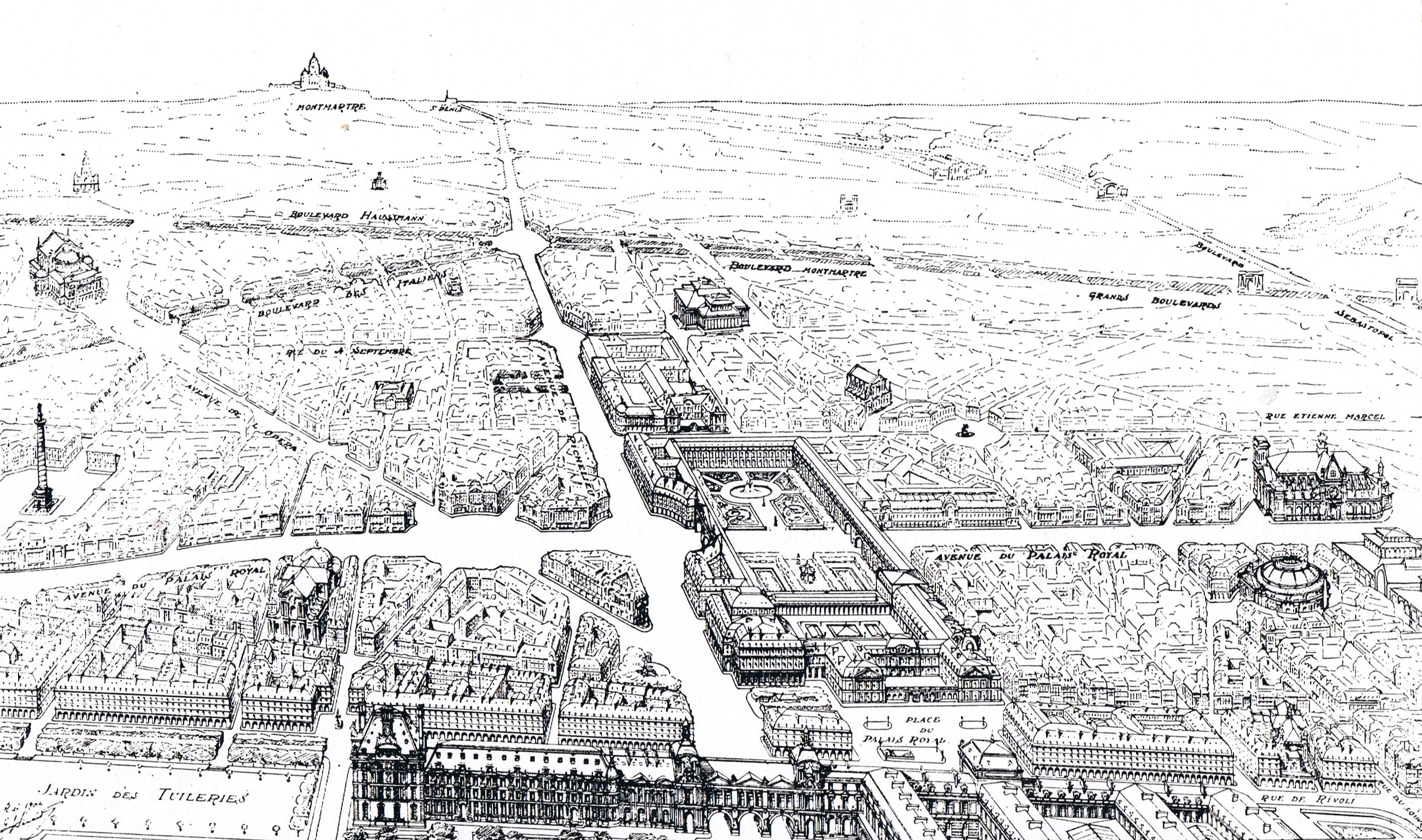
View of the Palais-Royal and the new great crossroad of Paris. In this view the new east-west Avenue du Palais-Royal cuts through the Palais-Royal, which lies on the east side of the north-south Avenue de Richelieu.

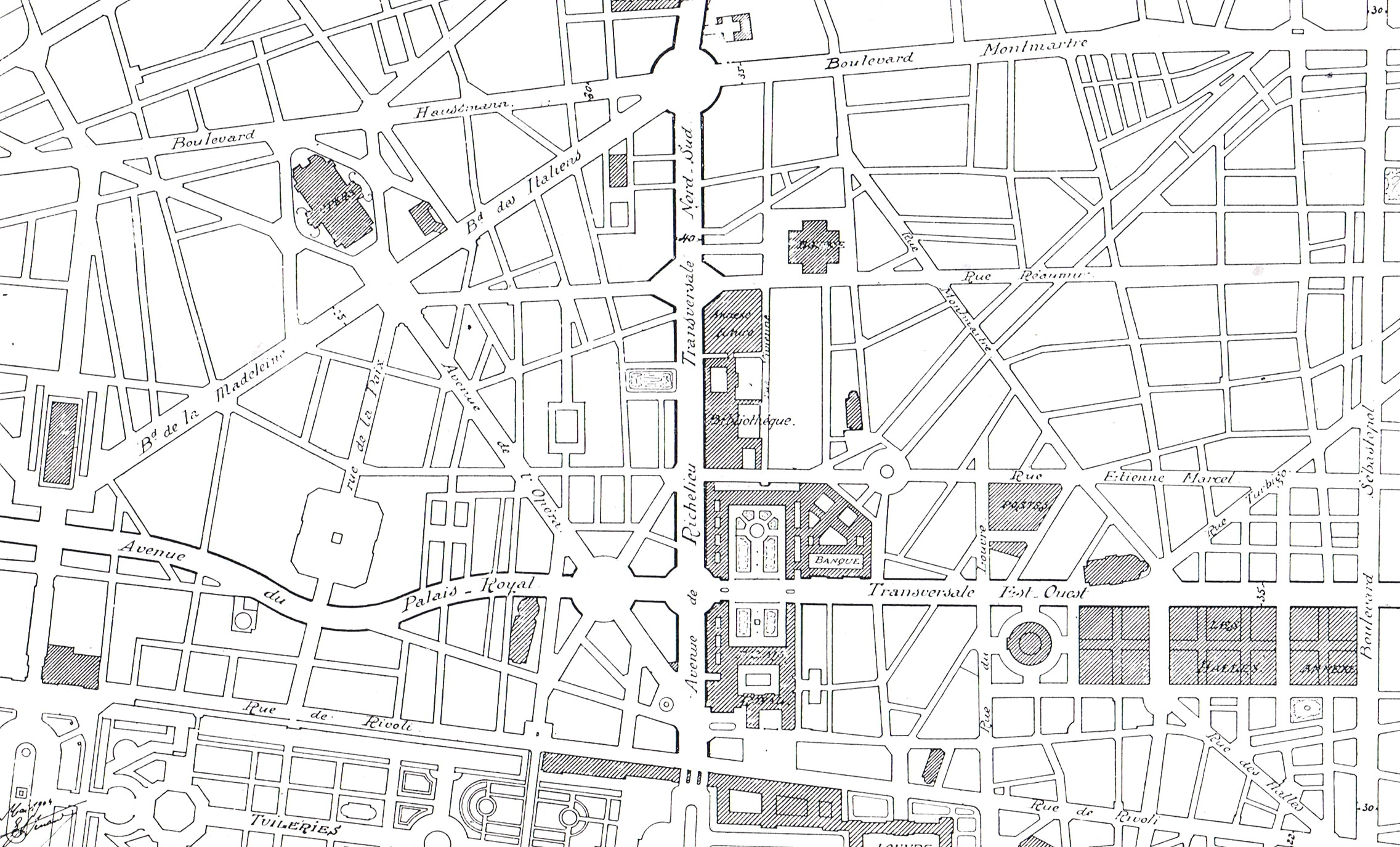
Plan of the new great crossroad of Paris

Anticipating growing volumes of traffic, Hénard was in favor of a network of ring roads around the city center linked by arterial roads crossing the city. He presented a project for a nouvelle grande-croisée Est-Ouest de Paris ("new major east-west crossing of Paris") in 1904. In his plan, two broad avenues would intersect at right-angles at the Palais-Royal, dividing Paris into four districts. They would join in a roundabout, cutting into the west side of the Palais-Royal.

The east-west artery, the new Avenue du Palais-Royal, would run along the route of the Rue Rambuteau, which would be expanded, through the Palais-Royal and into the Avenue de l'Opéra. The avenue would pass through arches cut through the wings of the Palais Royal similar to the arches in Hector Lefuel's wing of the Louvre. The avenue du Palais-Royal would be 35 metres (115 ft) wide. It would intersect the north-south Rue de Richelieu, enlarged to 40 metres (130 ft) in width and renamed the Avenue de Richelieu. Both avenues would be extended to the gates of Paris and would make the best possible use of existing roads. (Note: During the same period Henri Deverin, chief architect of historic monuments, also proposed opening the Palais-Royal to traffic. This project would make the architecture of the Palais-Royal similar to that of the Louvre.)

Eugene Hénard also proposed to unite the Palais-Royal with the Banque de France headquarters by removing the Rue Radziwill. The Banque de France building on the new Avenue du Palais Royal would be given "a facade worthy of the first financial institution in France". For Eugene Hénard, the general circulation of Paris would have benefited from the creation of the new Avenue du Palais-Royal as a "sort of aorta artery placed at the heart of the city, and by its powerful pulsations regularizing the central movement."

The project also included:

- Removing the narrow Valois, Montpensier and Beaujolais streets,
- Moving the Fontaine Molière at the corner of the Avenue de l'Opera and the new Richelieu Avenue, just opposite the Comédie-Française,
- Replacing the four passages of the Louvre beside Rue de Rivoli and building in their place a new gate of the Louvre, wider and similar to that originally planned by Lefuel,
- Creating a star junction with six branches at the meeting point of the new Avenue du Palais Royal and the Avenue de l'Opera.

For Eugène Hénard, the assembly formed by the arch through the Palais-Royal, the star junction, the square of the Comédie-Française with its fountains and the triumphal arch of the Louvre would create a group of sites in the center of Paris where monumental art would provide additional and undeniable beauty to the city. The entire project was discussed for several years, and in 1912 gave rise to great controversy within the Commission of Old Paris. However, the proposal did not gain official support.

=== Place de l'Opera ===
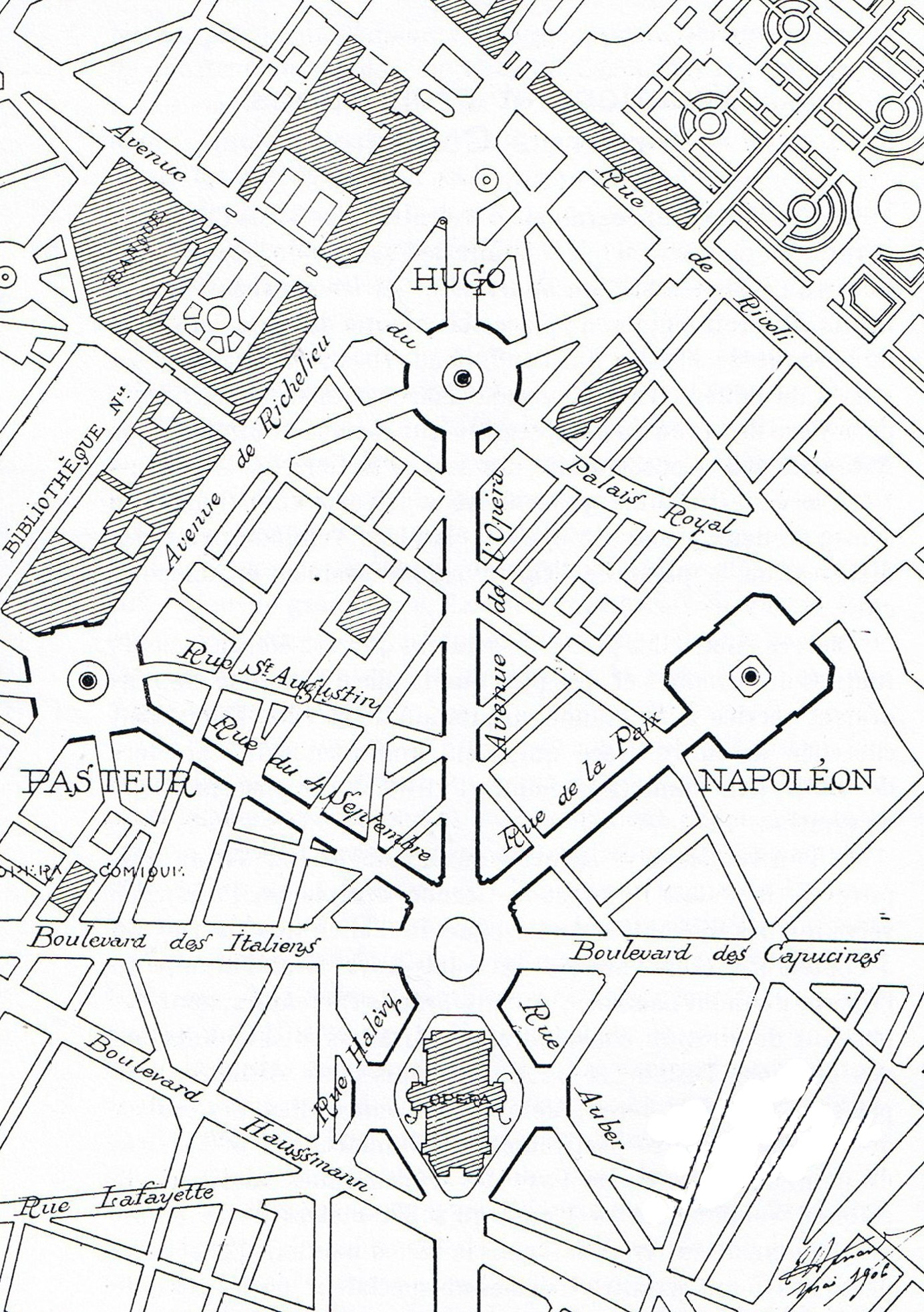
Project to redesign the Place de l'Opéra

Eugène Hénard pointed out that the squares before the 19th century had a larger area than those that succeeded them, even though traffic problems did not then exist: 19,000 square metres (200,000 sq ft) for the Place Royale, 17,000 square metres (180,000 sq ft) for the Place Vendome, 75,000 square metres (810,000 sq ft) for the Place de la Concorde, while the Place Saint-Michel is 6,000 square metres (65,000 sq ft), the Place de l'Opéra 9,000 square metres (97,000 sq ft) and the Place de la Republique 36,000 square metres (390,000 sq ft). Eugène Hénard advocated creation of new squares and also the expansion of existing squares such as the Place de l'Opéra.

For the Place de l'Opéra he added aesthetic considerations to concerns over the problem of motor traffic and motoring, regretting that it was impossible to see the main facade of the Opera building as a whole. He, therefore, proposed to double the width of the square and give it an almost circular form, slightly oval: the oval would be 120 by 136 metres (394 by 446 ft). This eccentricity would be small enough not to slow down the circular movement by bends with too narrow a radius. In the middle of the square, a large circular funnel 20 metres (66 ft) in diameter would provide light and air to radiating underground pedestrian galleries and the Metropolitan station. Access to the underground passages and the station would be via two central stairs and seven stairs around the perimeter.

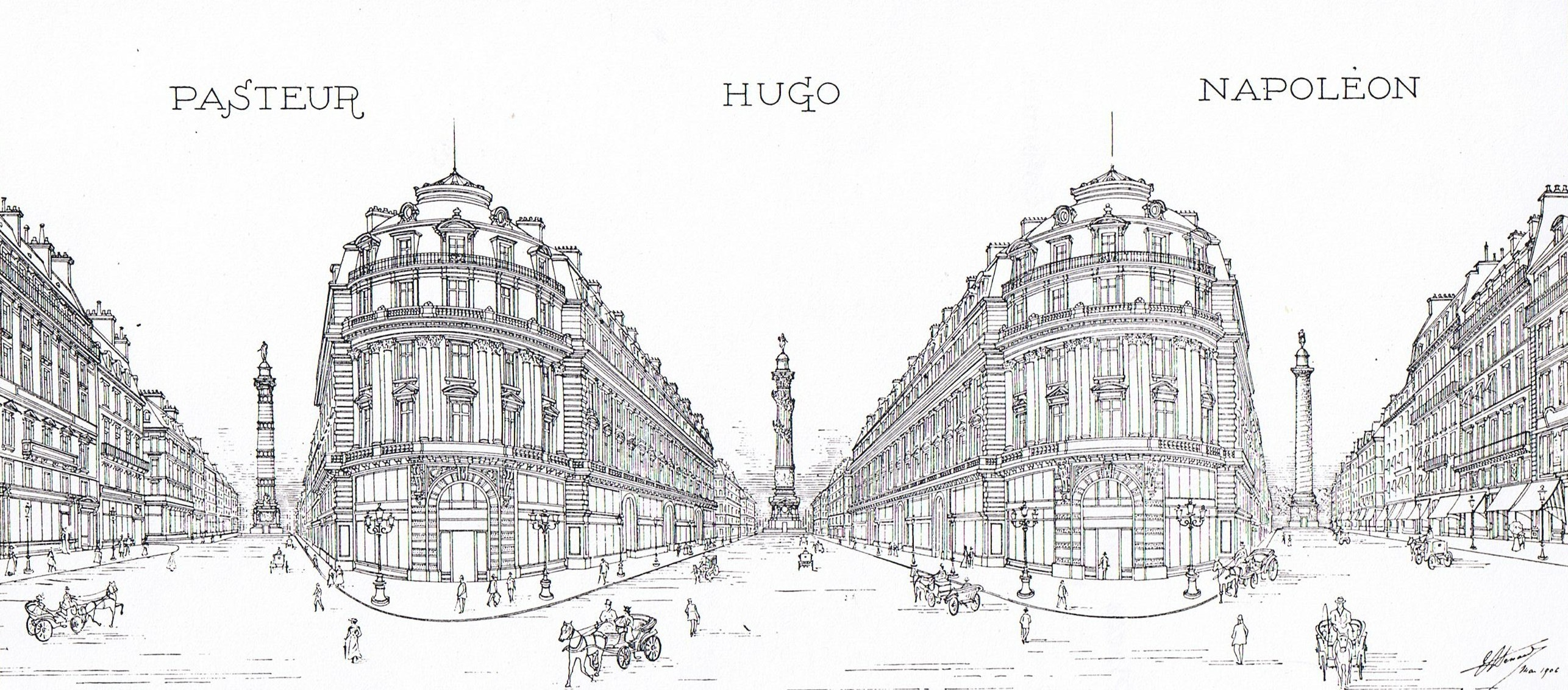
The columns proposed by Eugène Hénard to anchor the perspectives from the Place de l'Opéra

Looking north from the square there would be three views: along the Rue de la Paix to the column of the Grand Army, along the Avenue de l'Opéra, with the distant dome of one of the pavilions of the Louvre, and along the rue du 4-Septembre, with a more confused appearance. Hénard proposed to balance the perspectives by adding two columns the same height as the Vendôme column, one in the axis of the Avenue de l'Opera, the other in the rue du 4-September. He proposed to erect a column to the glory of arts topped with a statue of Victor Hugo, and another to the glory of science dedicated to Louis Pasteur. The Arts column would be on the axis of the Avenue de l'Opera, which leads to the Théâtre-Français and the Louvre. The Sciences column would be on the axis of the rue du 4-September leading to the National Library and the Conservatory of Arts and Crafts.

=== New parks ===
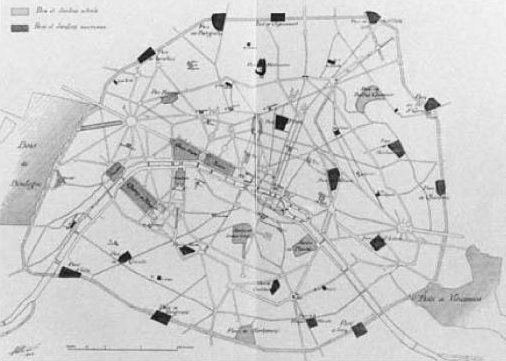
1903 Plan for new parks in Paris (dark shading). Existing parks are shown with light shading.

Eugène Hénard observed that Paris had a denser population but much less green space than London, with 1,740 hectares (4,300 acres) for Paris compared to 4,830 hectares (11,900 acres) for London. Since 1789 Paris had lost more than half of its planted areas: 391 hectares (970 acres) in 1789 compared to 137 hectares (340 acres) in 1903. He especially regretted that the park of Bagnolet which gave the northeast quarters a garden equivalent, if not superior to that of the Tuileries had disappeared, as well as the Clichy garden, Montrouge park and the enclosure of Saint-Lazare which could have formed a high-quality interior park".

In 1903 Hénard proposed using the land reserved for the obsolete Paris fortifications as the basis for a belt of parks. This was supported by the Musée Social, which in 1910 asked citizens to vote in the forthcoming elections for candidates who backed the parkland and urban conservation programs. Hénard campaigned forcibly to establish "spaces planted with trees, covered with grass and decorated with flowers with a surface at least equal to that of Parc Montsouris". He proposed to create nine major parks and thirteen playing fields around the borders of the city. With sizes that varied from 9 to 12 hectares (22 to 30 acres), the new parks were to be Levallois, Batignolles, Clignancourt, la Villette, Pré-Saint-Gervais, Charonne, Ivry, Vaugiard and Issy.

Eugène Hénard also proposed the creation of nine additional parks to decongest some areas lacking green spaces: Montmartre park including part of the hill, Saint-Denis park in the 10th arrondissement, Voltaire park in the 11th arrondissement, Ménilmontant park in the 20th arrondissement, Saint-Antoine park in the 12th arrondissement, Maison-Blanche and Croulebarbe parks in the 13th arrondissement, Maine and Grenelle parks in the 15th arrondissement. These parks would be smaller than the first group, but would not be less than 1 hectare (2.5 acres) in area.

The purpose of the project was to ensure that every person was at most 1 kilometre (0.62 mi) from a large park and 500 metres (1,600 ft) from a garden or square. In Hénard's view the requirements of public health, including the health and development of children, the development of cycling and gymnastics justified the financial commitment necessary to achieve such a program. Eugène Hénard stated that in the areas dedicated to sports, the cafes and restaurants that wanted to establish themselves would generate revenue that help cover the costs of developing and operating the parks. Many later planners drew on Hénard's 1912 plan for the city of Paris, with its great increase of open space.

== Sources ==
- Annales des ponts et chaussées: Mémoires et documents relatif à l'art des constructions et au service de l'ingénieur (in French). A. Dumas. 1888. p. 396.
- Bonilla, Mario (2002). "Espace public, espace urbain : l'heritage de la modernité". Espaces publics, architecture et urbanité de part et d'autre de l'Atlantique (in French). Université de Saint-Etienne. ISBN 978-2-86272-229-0.
- Calabi, Donatella (1997). Marcel Poëte et le Paris des années vingt: Aux origines de l'histoire des villes (in French). Editions L'Harmattan. ISBN 978-2-7384-6320-3.
- Cohen, Jean-Louis (2010). "Henri Prost et Istanbul" (in French). Archived from the original on 2015-06-19.
- Colquhoun, Alan (2002). Modern architecture. Oxford University Press. p. 149. ISBN 978-0-19-284226-8.
- Dumont, Marie-Jeanne (1991). Le Logement social à Paris 1850-1930: les habitations à bon marché. Editions Mardaga. ISBN 978-2-87009-349-8.
- Etlin, Richard A. (1996-12-15). Symbolic Space: French Enlightenment Architecture and Its Legacy. University of Chicago Press. p. 11. ISBN 978-0-226-22085-7.
- "Eugène Hénard et Edmond Paulin Exposition universelle de 1900" (in French). Musée d'Orsay.
- Flonneau, Mathieu (2003). L'automobile à la conquête de Paris: Chroniques illustrées. Presses des Ponts. p. 113. ISBN 978-2-85978-373-0.
- Giedion, S. (1967-01-01). Space, time and architecture: the growth of a new tradition. Harvard University Press. ISBN 978-0-674-83040-0.
- Gonzalo, Roberto; Habermann, Karl J. (2008). Architecture et efficacité énergétique: Principes de conception et de construction. Springer. ISBN 978-3-7643-8451-7.
- Hénard, Eugène (1891). "Trains continue et trottoire a vitesses multiples". Genie Civil (in French). pp. 408–409.
- Hénard, Eugène; Cohen, Jean-Louis (1982). Etudes sur les transformations de Paris, et autres écrits sur l'urbanisme (in French). L'Equerre. p. 30. ISBN 978-2-86425-031-9.
- Horne, Janet R. (2001-12-21). A Social Laboratory for Modern France: The Musée Social and the Rise of the Welfare State. Duke University Press. p. 253. ISBN 978-0-8223-8324-6.
- Kritzman, Lawrence D.; Reilly, Brian J. (2007-09-01). The Columbia History Of Twentieth-Century French Thought. Columbia University Press. p. 350. ISBN 978-0-231-10790-7.
- Lay, Maxwell G. (1992-12-01). Ways of the World: A History of the World's Roads and of the Vehicles That Used Them. Rutgers University Press. p. 187. ISBN 978-0-8135-2691-1.
- Le Palais Royal: exposition Musée Carnavalet, 9 mai-4 septembre 1988 (in French). Edition Paris-Musées. 1988. p. 282. ISBN 978-2-901414-30-8.
- Lemas, Nicolas (2008). Eugène Hénard et le futur urbain: Quelle politique pour l'utopie ? (in French). L'Harmattan. p. 19. ISBN 978-2-296-06843-8.
- Le Corbusier (2008). Toward An Architecture. frances lincoln ltd. p. 10. ISBN 978-0-7112-2809-2.
- Nansouty, Max de (1889). "Le Palais des Machines". Revue rose (in French). Germer Bailliére.
- Nilsen, Micheline (2011). Architecture in Nineteenth-Century Photographs: Essays on Reading a Collection. Ashgate Publishing, Ltd. ISBN 978-1-4094-0904-5.
- Nord, Philip G (2005). The Politics Of Resentment: Shopkeeper Protest In Nineteenth-century Paris. Transaction Publishers. ISBN 978-1-4128-3843-6.
- Parville, Henri de (1890). L'Exposition universelle [1889]. J. Rothschild. p. 209.
- "Passages et Galeries - 1ère partie". Sur les toits de paris (in French). 25 August 2010.
- "Projet de train continue". Science progrès découverte. Dunod. 1886.
- Rabinow, Paul (1995-12-01). French Modern: Norms and Forms of the Social Environment. University of Chicago Press. p. 254. ISBN 978-0-226-70174-5.
- Reps, John W. (2013). "Eugène Hénard: The Cities of the Future (1910) Introduction" (PDF). Cornell University. Archived from the original (PDF) on 2016-03-04.
- Rykwert, Joseph (2004). The seduction of place: the history and future of the city. Oxford University Press. p. 99. ISBN 978-0-19-280554-6.
- Tombs, Robert (2004-01-14). Nationhood and Nationalism in France: From Boulangism to the Great War 1889-1918. Taylor & Francis. p. 217. ISBN 978-0-203-16878-3.
- Von Moos, Stanislaus (2009). Le Corbusier: Elements of a Synthesis. 010 Publishers. p. 179. ISBN 978-90-6450-642-0.
- Wolf, Peter M. (1968). Eugène Hénard and the beginning of urbanism in Paris, 1900-1914. International Federation for Housing and Planning.
- Wolf, Peter M. (1974). The Future of the City: New Directions in Urban Planning. Watson-Guptill. p. 20. ISBN 978-0-8230-7182-1.

=== Further reading ===
- Bruant, Catherine (2008). Eugène Hénard, l'invention de l'avenir. L'infortuné destin d'une famille d'architectes de la Ville de Paris (in French). fabricA. pp. 68–185.
