= Léon Vaudoyer =

French architect (1803–1872)

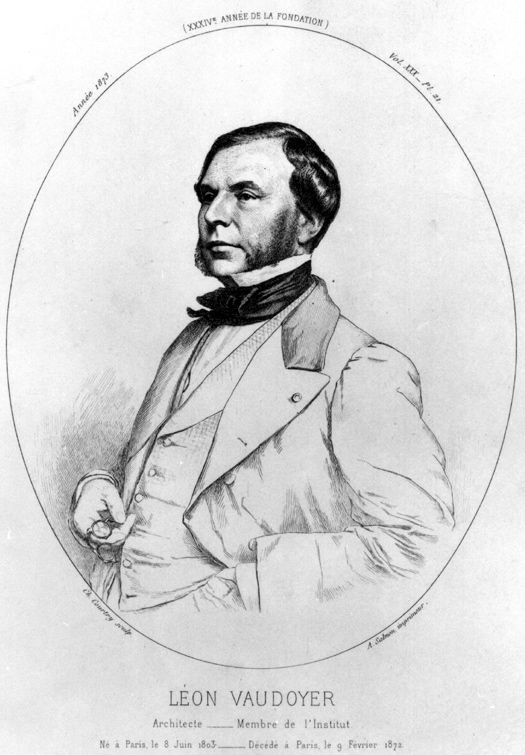
Léon Vaudoyer, portrait by Charles Courtry

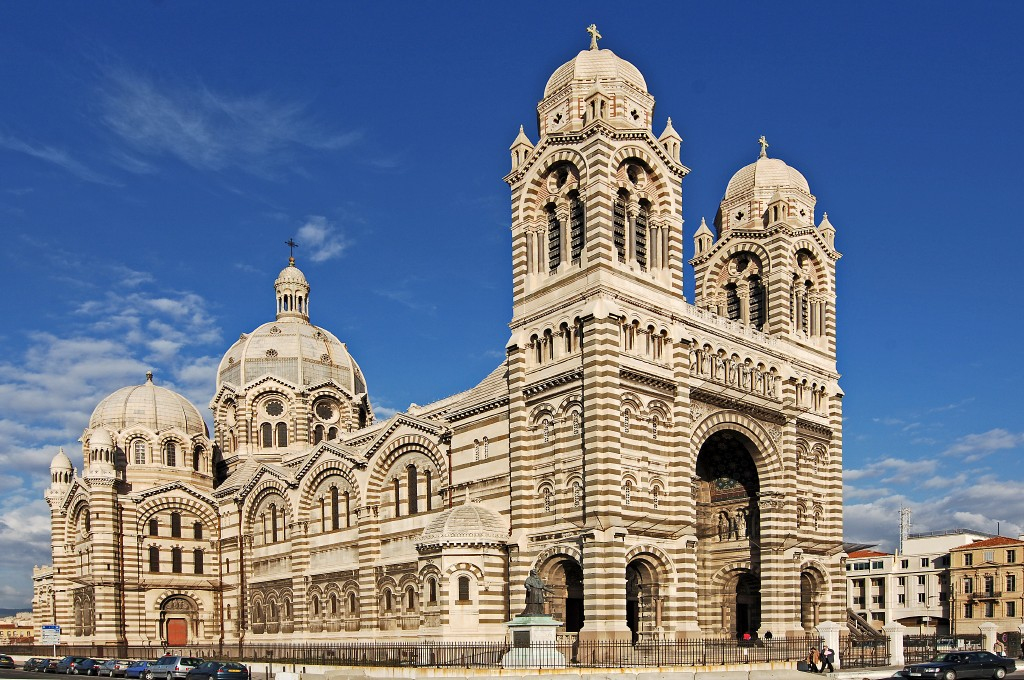
Cathédrale Sainte-Marie-Majeure.

Léon Vaudoyer (French pronunciation: [leɔ̃ vodwaje]; 7 June 1803 – 9 February 1872) was a French architect.

== Biography ==
Vaudoyer was born in Paris, the son of architect Antoine Vaudoyer.

With his contemporaries Félix Duban, Henri Labrouste, and Louis Duc he became a leading light in architectural circles in the 1830s.

He won the Grand Prix de Rome in 1826. In 1838 he won the design competition for the hôtel de ville in Avignon (unrealized), and from 1845 onwards he (with Gabriel-Auguste Ancelet) enlarged the buildings of the Priory of Saint-Martin-des-Champs (now the Conservatoire National des Arts et Métiers). In 1852 he was given responsibility for reconstructing the Sorbonne (unrealized), and also for designing the polychrome Cathédrale Sainte-Marie-Majeure in Marseille. Juste Lisch and Edmond Paulin were among his students.

== Bibliography ==
- Théodore Ballu: Notice sur M. Léon Vaudoyer. Firmin Didot Frères, Paris 1873.
- Barry Bergdoll, Daphné Doublet, Antoinette Le Normand-Romain, Marie-Laure Crosnier Leconte: Les Vaudoyer : une dynastie d'architectes. Réunion des musées nationaux, Paris, 1991. ISBN 2-7118-2486-1.
- David van Zanten: Designing Paris : the architecture of Duban, Labrouste, Duc, and Vaudoyer. MIT Press, 1987. ISBN 0-262-22031-8.
