= Walter Kershaw =

English artist (1940–2026)

- Born: 7 December 1940; Rochdale, Lancashire, England
- Died: 6 September 2026 (aged 85); Rochdale, Greater Manchester, England
- Education: De La Salle College, Salford
- Alma mater: King's College, Durham University
- Known for: Graffiti; Street art Sculpture; Mural
- Notable work: The Trafford Park murals, "Inside-Out House"
- Spouse: Hilary Cooper (divorced)
- Website: walterkershaw.co.uk

Walter Kershaw (7 December 1940 – 6 September 2026) was an English artist in oils and watercolours who is best known for his large scale, external, mural paintings in Northern England and the Americas.

== Background ==
Second iteration of Trafford Park mural photographed in 2003

Kershaw was the only son of Florence Kershaw (née Ward) (1916–2010), a retired school caterer; and Walter Kershaw (1917–1998), who served in the Royal Air Force (1936–1946) at Duxford, achieving the rank of Flight Sergeant. He had two younger sisters. Kershaw attended De La Salle College, Salford from 1951 to 1958; and was later a student under the tutelage of Victor Pasmore, Richard Hamilton and Lawrence Gowing at King's College, Durham University (now part of Newcastle University) from 1958 to 1962, graduating with a BA Honours in Fine Art. Kershaw has been twice married and divorced and is the father of twins (one son and one daughter) with Gillian Halliwell.

After graduating Kershaw taught at Bury Arts and Crafts Centre but has always primarily been self-employed and continued to work from his studio in Littleborough until his incarceration in 2021. His early large external murals painted on slum properties alongside his provocative public sculptures attracted much media attention throughout the '70s and early '80s. He was featured in interviews with Melvyn Bragg, Anna Ford (for Granada TV); Sue MacGregor (on BBC Radio 4); as a guest of Janet Street-Porter (on London Weekend Television); and also alongside Eric Morecambe on Russell Harty's BBC Two chat show.

George Best was a good friend of Kershaw's and purchased six large drawings and oil paintings from the artist. He also found support in Bob Monkhouse who not only purchased his paintings but also corresponded with him and promoted Kershaw's work on his BBC Radio 2 show.

Ian Potts of the BBC, then a student at the Polytechnic of Central London made a film about Kershaw's work called The First Graffiti Artist. It went on to win the best student film award at the Cannes Film Festival.

Kershaw's work can be found in public collections worldwide including Bury Art Museum, Salford Museum and Art Gallery, the Victoria and Albert Museum, the Arts Council, the Calouste Gulbenkian Foundation and the National Collection of Brazilian Art in São Paulo.

Kershaw died at Leighton House Retirement Home in Rochdale, on 6 September 2026, aged 85.

== Controversies and incarceration ==
In March 2013, Kershaw at the age of 72, pleaded guilty to assaulting an acquaintance the previous year and was fined and given a 12-month conditional discharge.

Kershaw was also the subject of two year restraining order in December 2013. Since 2009 he had received a number of warnings from the police for harassment of Catherine Mitchell, a former life model, with whom he had a brief relationship in 2006.

In 2015 after repeated warnings, Kershaw was banned for life from contacting Miss Mitchell under the terms of another restraining order, but he continued to accost Miss Mitchell in the years that followed, and appeared before the courts repeatedly for breaching the order. In 2021 he was finally imprisoned for a term of four years.

== Selected exhibitions and critical reception ==
Major group and solo shows include Bear Lane Gallery, Oxford (1962); Salford Art Gallery (1969); House of Commons (1972); and "Lancashire South of the Sands", which toured from the County and Regimental Museum, Preston (1988)

1964: Avgarde Gallery, Manchester. First solo show. Review by Robert Waterhouse in The Guardian

1969: Salford Art Gallery. Review by Merete Bates in The Guardian

1971: North-West Gallery Art Service (touring). Review by Merete Bates in The Guardian

1972: Salford Art Gallery. Review by Merete Bates in The Guardian

1990: Salford Art Gallery. "From Rochdale to Rio". Review by Robert Clark in The Guardian

== Selected works ==
=== Paintings ===
Kershaw has travelled extensively and his work (drawings, watercolours, oil paintings and some photos) can be put into series; for example:

- 1964 to present day: The Algarve
- 1974: San Francisco / Oakland
- 1987–1994: Argentina, Ecuador, Paraguay and Peru
- 1993: Pacific Islands

Other works include:

Year	Painting	Medium	Holding Institution	Dimensions	Acquisition
c. 1969	View over Rochdale	Oil on board	Bury Art Museum	H 77 x W 88 cm	Purchased
c. 1970	Highway Chile, M62	Oil on hardboard	Salford Museum & Art Gallery	H 120 x W 174 cm	Purchased from artist
c. 1971	Rochdale Arts Festival	Acrylic on canvas	Touchstones Rochdale	H 123 x W 123 cm	Gift from the Amateur Societies
c. 1971	Nude in a Polythene Interior	Oil on board	Towneley Hall Art Gallery & Museum	H 61 x W 91.4 cm	Purchased
c. 1974	Fiddlers Ferry	Oil on canvas	Museum of Lancashire	H 115 x W 115 cm	Purchased from artist
c. 2009	Trafford Park Mural	Oil on plywood	Waterside Arts Centre, Sale	H 193 x W 183 cm	Commissioned
unknown	Scrum-Half and Prop Forward	Oil on board	University of Salford	H 121.5 x W 91 cm	Purchased
unknown	Ready Steady Go	Oil on board	University of Salford	H 120 x W 120 cm	Purchased

=== Murals ===
Murals and street art are the medium Kershaw is best known for. Many were painted onto gable-ends of Victorian terraces in the Greater Manchester region and almost all of the early examples have now been demolished or lost through redevelopment. Kershaw always accepted the ephemeral nature of these pieces and often deliberately selected condemned properties as the canvas of his choice. In addition to the giant murals he also painted a number of neglected bridges in the Burnley, Bury and Rochdale areas which led to cease and desist type letters from the local authorities who were more concerned with ongoing costs to maintain such bold colour schemes as opposed to the aesthetic. Kershaw often painted these very early on Sunday mornings when few witnesses were around and these are now considered an early example of guerrilla art.

Year	Mural	Location	Other people involved	Commissioned by	Notes
1972	Giant Pansies	Ramsay Street, Rochdale	Painted jointly with Anne Kelly		Demolished
c.1973	Madonna with Child	Kay Street, Bury			Demolished
c.1973	King George V - Great Western Locomotive mural	Parsons Lane South Car Park Bury			Demolished
1974	Spitfire	Hornby Street / North Street, Bury	Eric Kean, Graham Cooper, Paul O'Reilly and Olive Frith		Demolished
1974	Alvin Stardust	Manchester Road, Heywood	Painted jointly with Eric Kean, assisted by Paul O'Reilly and Susan O'Reilly		Filmed by Granada TV with Alvin Stardust signing the piece. Since demolished
1974	Public urinals	Halifax Road / Wardleworth Place, Rochdale	Painted jointly with Linda Garner		Demolished
1974	Landscape mural	Littleborough, Rochdale			
1975	Condor	Condor Ironworks, Library Lane / Featherstall Road North, Oldham	Eric Kean, Graham Cooper, Paul O'Reilly and Olive Frith	Funded with £250 from GMC	153 feet long. Since demolished
1975	Toyshed mural	Nursery School, Brimrod, Rochdale			
1975	Fulledge Community Centre mural	Brunshaw, Burnley		The Mid-Pennine Association for the Arts	
1976	Inside-Out House	53 Derby Street, Rochdale	Tony Smart (the Tretchikoff), Stewart Dawson (the ornaments) Arnold Solomon (the wallpaper stencils/designs), Peter Dent (the kitchen). Assisted by Olive Frith	BBC Two	Filmed for BBC Two's Terra Firma series. Since demolished
1977	North Western Museum of Science & Industry mural	Oddfellows Hall, Grosvenor Street, Manchester	Designed by Kenneth Billyard		Site redeveloped
1978	The Caledonian mural	Bury Market			
1979	Magic carpet scene mural and bollards	Rochdale			Demolished
1979	Norwich school mural	Unknown school, Norwich	Peter Dent	Funded with £250 Arts Council grant	80 feet long
1982	The Trafford Park mural (v1)	East wall of Victoria Warehouse, Trafford Park	Assisted by John Abbot, Hilary Cooper and Brigitte Streich (née Curtis)	Trafford Park Planning Department	Filmed by the BBC for Nationwide. Unveiled by Denis Law. Replaced by v2 in 1993
1983	Life in Brazil	Corner of Armando Alvares Penteado St. and Avaré St., Higienopolis, São Paulo	Assisted by Hilary Cooper and 26 FAAP students	The British Council and Fundação Armando Alvares Penteado (FAAP)	Filmed by Rede Globo, Brazil
1983	Avro / British Aerospace mural	Canteen, BAe factory, Chadderton, Oldham	Painted jointly with Peter Dent		News report on Look North West
1985	Recife Metro mosaic murals	Estação Central do Metrô, Rua Floriano Peixoto, Recife		Recife Metro	3 mosaic murals for the inauguration of the Recife Metro
1985	Cultura Inglesa mural	Av. Santo Amaro 6781, São Paulo		The British Council and Cultura Inglesa	Lost
1985	Norwich Images	Wensum Lodge, 169 King Street, Norwich	Assisted by Ian Starsmore		Filmed for Anglia TV's Folio series
1985	Hollingworth Lake Visitor Centre mural	Hollingworth Lake, Littleborough		Recreation and Arts Committee, Rochdale	Approx. 33 feet x 10 feet
1988	Manchester United F.C. murals	Old Trafford, Manchester	Researched by Cliff Butler; designed by Peter Dent		Unveiled by Sir Matt Busby, Martin Edwards and Sir Alex Ferguson
1988	The Liverpool and Manchester Railway mural		Painted jointly with Peter Dent		Modified 2002
1993	The Trafford Park mural (v2)	East wall of Victoria Warehouses, Trafford Park	Assisted by Jennie Lewis, Julie Nuttall, Adelia Villa and Stuart Dawson	Trafford Park Planning Department	64 feet wide x 75 feet high, removed 2007
1996	Sarajevo Winter Festival mural	Hasan Kikić School, Sarajevo	Murals by Andrea Tierney, Gillian Halliwell, Jack Lewis and Walter Kershaw	Austrian Embassy in Sarajevo	Filmed for Bosnian TV
1996	After the Bomb	Arndale Centre, Manchester	Painted jointly with Gillian Halliwell	Arndale management and P&O	Manchester themed on temporary MDF shuttering to disguise bomb damage
1997	History of Ashton-under-Lyne	Shopping Centre, Ashton-under-Lyne	Painted jointly with Gillian Halliwell	Shopping centre management	
2006	Lancaster Bomber mural	Canteen, BAe Woodford, Cheshire			60 feet x 20 feet
2012	Littleborough Coach House sign	Lodge Street, Littleborough			
2014	Lilac Mill mural	Beal Lane, Shaw	Assisted by Suzanne Robinson	JD Williams mail order company	For the 100 year anniversary of Lilac Mill
2014	Dulwich Outdoor Gallery mural	Bellenden Road / Choumert Road, Peckham	Painted jointly with Peter Seth	Dulwich Picture Gallery	
2015	North Woolwich mural	North Woolwich	Ingrid Beazley, Peter Seth and Richard Dent	Crossrail and The Richard Griffini Gallery	

=== Sculpture ===
In 1970 Kershaw was commissioned to design both the front and rear doors for a new Roman Catholic church in Longsight, Manchester. Cast in aluminium, they depicted the creation of the Universe and the Apocalypse. The doors were complemented by a stained glass window by fellow Rochdale artist Chris Burnett. Located at the intersection of Hamilton Road and Montgomery Road, the church of Saint Robert of Newminster was demolished in 2004.

Other pieces include:

- c.1964: Etruscan Warrior
- c.1967: Fantasy
- c.1968: Aurora (Glass-fibre resin)
- c.1969: West Pennine Woman (fibreglass)
- c.1969: Bodyrock (fibreglass)
- c.1969: Incandescent (cardboard and fibreglass)
- c.1970: Prime Cuts (fibreglass)

== Appearances ==
=== Television and film ===
- 1974: (11 October) Featured in a segment by Martin Young for Nationwide, BBC One
- 1976: Terra Firma series on BBC Two. Half-hour documentary commissioned by BBC Two for Kershaw to paint a mural on a gable end in Deeplish, Rochdale
- 1976: The First Graffiti Artist. Half-hour documentary with fantasy interludes, on Kershaw's early murals. Produced and directed by Ian Potts, at that time a film student at the Polytechnic of Central London. Ian Potts now works in the Historical Film Department at the BBC in London. The film won best student film category at the Cannes Film Festival, (available from NW Film Archives in Manchester). Youtube
- Mid 70's: Guest appearance for Janet Street Porter when she was a presenter for LWT
- 1982: (19 October) Interviewed by Martin Henfield for BBC's regional Look North West programme
- 1982: (4 November) Guest appearance on Russell Harty's BBC Two chat show alongside Eric Morecambe
- 1982: (24 November) News report on BBC's Look North West about Kershaw who had been employed by Leigh Council to teach unemployed youngsters how to paint murals
- 1983: (20 April) News report on BBC's Look North West about Kershaw's mural at the Avro / BAe factory in Chadderton
- 1983: Featured on Rede Globo (Brazilian National TV)
- 1985: Film by Carlyle Video London shown on West German TV
- 1987: (12 February) 'City of Norwich' murals; part of the Folio series by Anglia TV, presented by Anne Gregg, directed by Michael Edwardes. Half-hour programme including Walter's assistant Ian Starsmore
- 1996: (February): Bosnian National TV as part of the annual Sarajevo Winter Festival
- 2013: (12 February) Featured on the BBC's The One Show in a segment with fellow Rochdalian Andy Kershaw

=== Radio ===
- 1975: (10 October) Contributor on Woman's Hour, BBC Radio 4
- 1983: (22 December) Guest on Sue MacGregor's Conversation Piece series for BBC Radio 4
- 2012: (13 September) Subject of a radio programme entitled 'Walter Kershaw: The UK's First Graffiti Artist?' on BBC Radio 4
