= Mid-Day Scot =

British express passenger train service

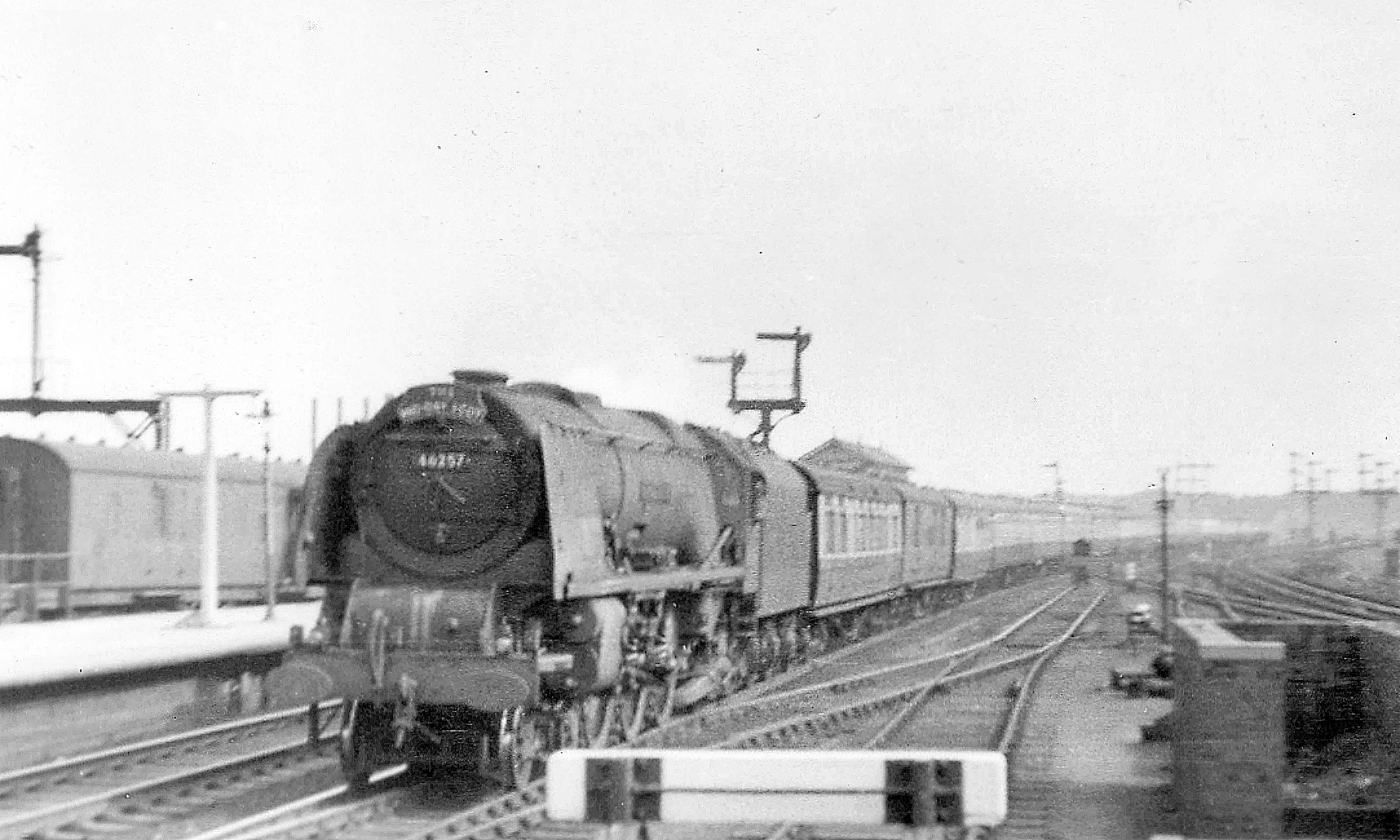
- Midday Scot passing Warrington Bank Quay on 9 July 1954. The locomotive is Stanier/Ivatt Princess Coronation Class 8P 4-6-2 No. 46257 City of Salford.

Overview
- Service type: Passenger train
- First service: 27 September 1927
- Last service: 1965
- Former operator(s): LMS, BR

Route
- Termini: London Euston; Glasgow Central and Edinburgh Princes Street
- Service frequency: Daily
- Line(s) used: West Coast Main Line

The Mid-Day Scot was a British express passenger train launched in 1927 running from Edinburgh Princes Street and Glasgow Central, joining to form a train to London Euston.

The Mid-Day Scot was introduced by the London, Midland and Scottish Railway company in September 1927. In 1928 a section of the train departed Princes Street at 1.30pm with weekend return fares of £5 10s (1st class) (equivalent to £418.57 in 2023) and £3 6s (3rd class) (equivalent to £251.14 in 2023).

As with many named express trains, the name was discontinued during the Second World War. The name was inherited by the London Midland Region of British Railways and re-instated for the winter timetable in 1949. In 1953 a modest time improvement was introduced to save 15 minutes on the schedule with the train leaving London Euston at 1.30pm and arriving at Glasgow at 9.35pm.

Four coaches of the Mid-Day Scot derailed at Uddingston railway station, nine miles south of Glasgow on 17 June 1957. One person was killed and five were injured.

In the timetable for winter 1959–60, the Mid-day Scot became non-stop between Carlisle and London, having in earlier years called at Rugby. It was accelerated by 49 minutes in the down (northward) direction and by 30 minutes in the up, for a new journey time in both directions of 7 hours 15 minutes, identical with the other two daytime named trains of the period between the two cities, the Royal Scot and The Caledonian. All three trains were restricted to eight coaches to save weight, and the number of passengers carried was limited to the seating capacity of the train, standing passengers not being permitted.

== Coppenhall Junction rail crash ==
See Coppenhall Junction rail crash (1962)

On Boxing Day, 1962, the Mid-Day Scot hauled by English Electric type 4 diesel D346, with 13 coaches and 500 passengers, ran into a Liverpool to Birmingham service hauled by an electric locomotive with eight coaches with 300 passengers, near Crewe. Eighteen people, including four children, died in the crash, with many more injured. The line at Crewe had recently been fitted with the latest signalling system. The enquiry blamed both the driver, John Russell, and the fireman, Victor McCallum. When held at a red light, they attempted to telephone to Coppenhall junction signal box, but they were unsuccessful because the signal telephones on the up lines had failed just previously. The driver then acted on his own initiative and, without seeing or ascertaining that the line was clear to the next signal, as required by the rules, he passed the signal at red and proceeded forward at a speed much in excess of that demanded by the circumstances. He saw the next signal change from red to yellow for the Birmingham train and it seems he assumed that it had become clear for his train and accelerated. Neither he nor his fireman saw the Birmingham train until it was too late.

== See also ==
List of named passenger trains of the United Kingdom
