= Royal Scot (train) =

London to Glasgow express passenger service

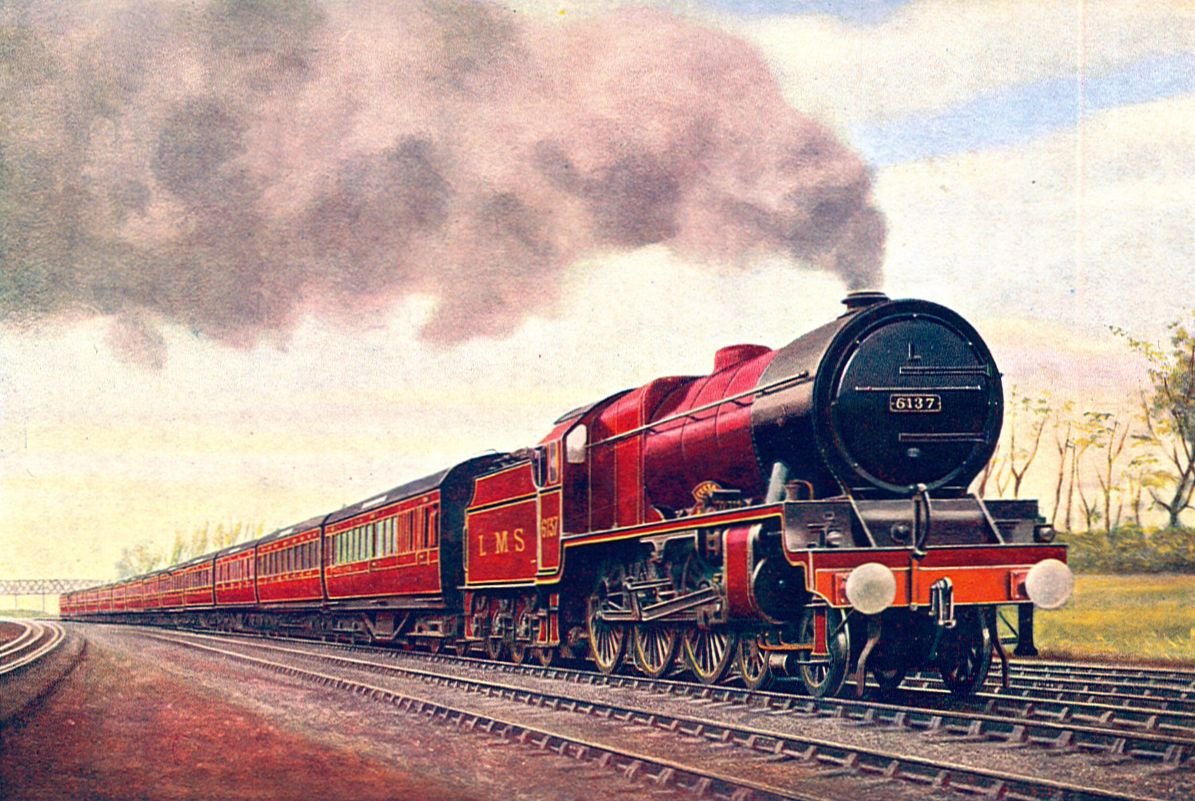
- An illustration of "Royal Scot Class" No. 6137 Vesta hauling the Royal Scot circa 1928

Overview
- Service type: Passenger train
- First service: 11 July 1927
- Last service: 2005
- Current operator: Avanti West Coast
- Former operators: LMS, BR

Route
- Termini: London Euston; Glasgow Central
- Service frequency: Daily
- Line used: West Coast Main Line

The Royal Scot was a named passenger express train that ran between London Euston and Glasgow Central on the West Coast Main Line (WCML), with previously a portion also going to Edinburgh.

== History ==
=== Steam era ===
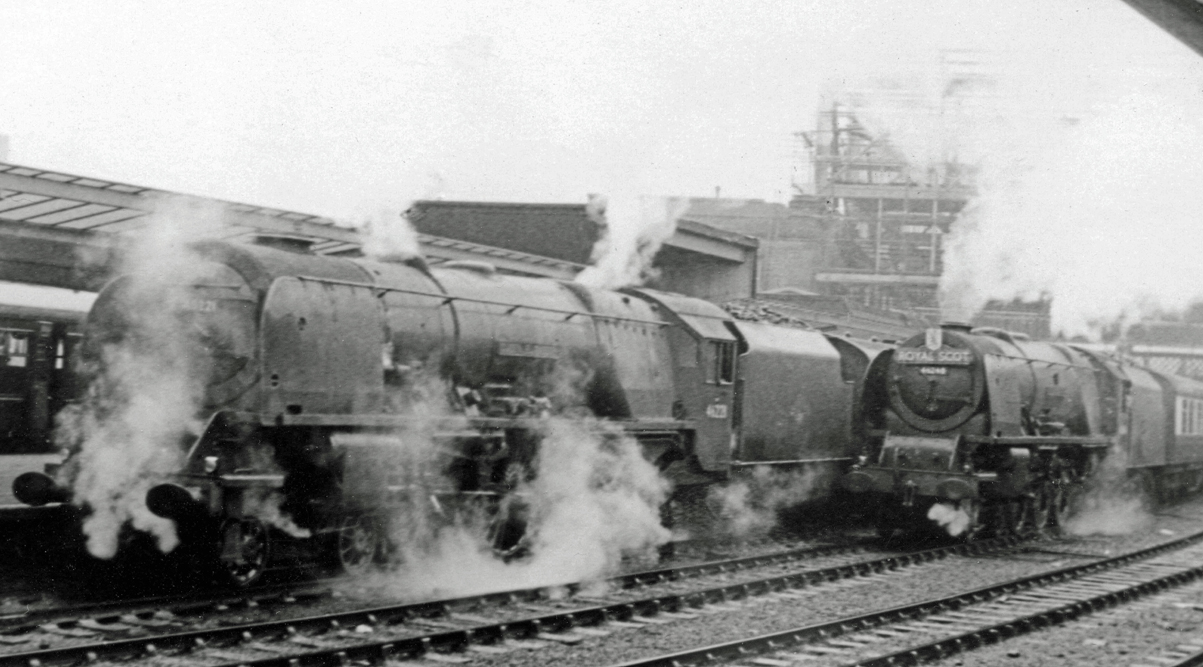
Princess Coronation Class engines changing over at Carlisle on the southbound Royal Scot in 1958. 46221 Queen Elizabeth (left) with 46240 City of Coventry with headboard ready to go south

The timetabled service which eventually was known as the Royal Scot first ran in 1862. For many years it departed from both ends at 10:00 (mirroring the Flying Scotsman on the East Coast Main Line). From 1874, the train was hauled by LNWR Improved Precedent Class 2-4-0 locomotives. When 4-4-0 locos became available from 1897, the train was generally hauled by one of the fastest engines available. Early on this would normally be a LNWR Precursor Class 4-4-0, then from 1913 the LNWR Claughton Class 4-6-0, in each case with a change to Caledonian Railway locomotives at Carlisle Citadel and over Beattock Summit to Glasgow.

On 11 July 1927, the London Midland and Scottish Railway (LMS) relaunched the service under a new name, the Royal Scot. Initially the service was non-stop with an engine change at Carnforth, and the train divided at Symington with a portion continuing to Glasgow and the other portion to Edinburgh. All trains were hauled double headed; the Carnforth to Glasgow leg was hauled by two Midland 4-4-0 Compounds. In August 1927, the LMS introduced the modern and more powerful Royal Scot Class, a series of 4-6-0 locomotives that took over the service and ran between London Euston and Carlisle non-stop. This set a new British record for the longest non-stop run. At Carlisle, an engine of the same class based in Polmadie, Glasgow, would take over.

The Royal Scot train gradually became heavier, including the addition of dining coaches. In 1933, the Royal Scot was hauled by the Princess Royal Class, a group of 4-6-2 Pacifics and in 1937, by the new Coronation Class that featured a streamlined design. These engines sometimes worked the train with a brief stop at Carlisle for a change of crew.

In 1960 the down Royal Scot had its departure time from Euston changed to 09:05. The down train was speeded up by 40 minutes and the up train by 15 minutes, for a new journey time in both directions of 7 hours 15 minutes, identical with the other two daytime named trains of the era between London and Glasgow, The Caledonian and the Mid-Day Scot. All three trains at this period were restricted to eight coaches to save weight, and the number of passengers carried was limited to the seating capacity of the train, standing passengers not being permitted. All three trains ran non-stop between London and Carlisle.

=== Diesel and electric era ===
Diesel locomotives started to take over haulage of the train from the early 1960s. AC electric locomotives took over in 1966 following the electrification of the WCML south of Crewe, with diesel locomotives continuing to pull the train north of Crewe.

By 1970 the London departure time of the Royal Scot had become 10:05, that from Glasgow 09:25, with a total journey time of 6 hours 35 minutes. It ran Monday to Saturday, and called only at Crewe and Carlisle.

Electrification to Glasgow took place in 1973–4, ending the locomotive change at Crewe and bringing the replacement of the early electric locomotives with the new British Rail Class 87s, titled Royal Scots by BR although better known as Electric Scots, in order to avoid clashing with the earlier steam locomotive class of that name.

The first stop out of Euston became Preston, for a crew change, and calls were now also made at Oxenholme and Carlisle. Traction became more mixed following the arrival of British Rail Class 90s in 1988.

The service lost its name in 2005 when Virgin Trains dropped its last remaining named trains, The Royal Scot and The Caledonian, from their timetables. By this time the northbound departure left Euston at 10:15 and the southbound departure left Glasgow at 09:49. The service continued to run non-stop between Euston and Preston until December 2008 and non-stop services between the two stations would cease entirely in 2016. Instead, London-Glasgow now has an hourly service of British Rail Class 390 Pendolino units operated by Avanti West Coast with a standard overall journey time of 4 hours 31 minutes, running non-stop between London and Warrington Bank Quay.

In June 2021, an Avanti West Coast British Rail Class 390 Pendolino, 390044, was named Royal Scot after the flagship train before attempting to set a record time between London Euston and Glasgow, which it failed to do by 21 seconds. 390044 is still named Royal Scot as of 2026.

== See also ==
- Mid-Day Scot
- The Caledonian
