= Skyrider =

Skyrider or SkyRider may refer to:

- Bud Berning, a.k.a. Skyrider, a Denver-based musician and member of Sole and the Skyrider Band
- Skyrider Flugschule, a German aircraft manufacturer and flight training school
- Skyrider, the main character and alternate title of the Japanese tokusatsu television series Kamen Rider
- HTM Skyrider, a helicopter
- Skyrider (roller coaster), a former roller coaster at Canada's Wonderland, now known as Freestyle at Cavallino Matto
- SkyRider (seat), a plane seat manufactured by Aviointeriors
- SKT Skyrider 06, a Swiss helicopter design
