= Stuart Flinders =

British journalist (born 1960)

Stuart Flinders (born 1960, in Bolton, Lancashire) is a journalist, reporter and occasional presenter who used to work for BBC North West Tonight.

== Early life ==
Flinders grew up in Bolton and is a supporter of Bolton Wanderers F.C.

== Career ==
In 1991, he joined BBC North West Tonight after being hired by Dave Guest. In 2008, he spent six months working for the BBC News channel and presented some weekend bulletins on BBC One during that period. He also occasionally presents BBC Radio 4 programme You and Yours. Before working for the BBC, he spent a short period working for printed media in Australia. He also regularly presented concerts for BBC Radio 3 for around 10 years.

He became the longest serving reporter on BBC North West Tonight. On 12 October 2020, after nearly 30 years on the programme, he left the BBC and the programme.
