= Roger Johnson (TV presenter) =

English television presenter

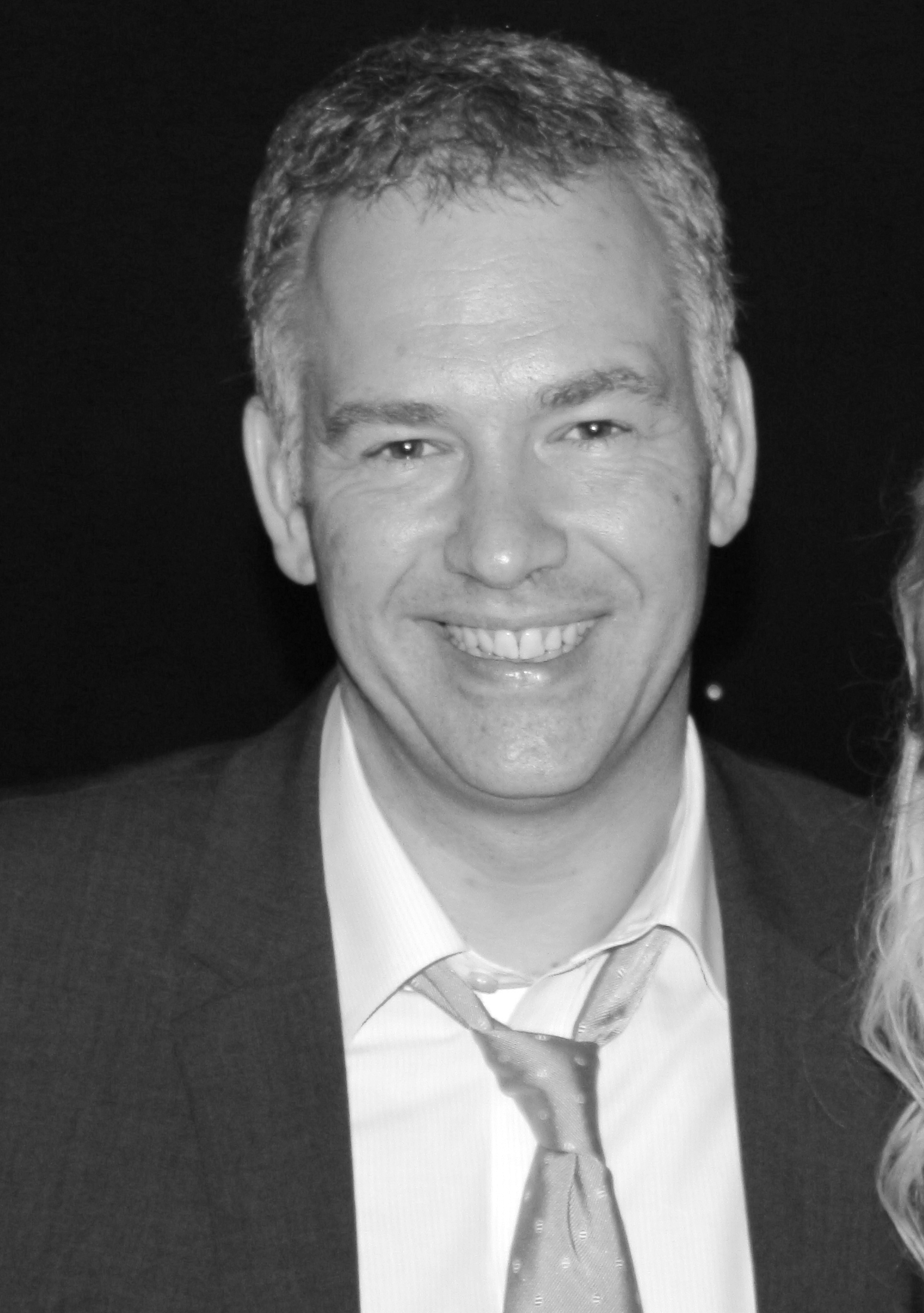
- Johnson in 2015.
- Born: Roger Johnson; Chesterton, Staffordshire, England
- Occupation: Newsreader
- Years active: 1997–present
- Notable credit: Presenter/producer for BBC North West Tonight
- Spouse: Lucy Johnson
- Children: 3

Roger Johnson is an English television journalist, newsreader and presenter, currently working as the main presenter for the regional news programme BBC North West Tonight, as well as a regular weekend presenter of BBC Breakfast and other national BBC News platforms.

== Early life ==
Johnson was born in the former mining village of Chesterton, in Staffordshire and grew up in the market town of Newcastle-under-Lyme (also in Staffordshire). He is the son of BBC Radio Stoke commentator Nigel Johnson.

== Education ==
Johnson was educated at Newcastle-under-Lyme School, an independent school in his hometown, followed by the University of Birmingham and the University of California, Berkeley.

== Life and career ==
Johnson joined the BBC after university – working as a reporter at BBC Radio Solent and BBC Radio Manchester. His first television role dating back to 1997 was as a sports journalist on BBC South's news programme South Today. During this time he was also the relief presenter for Sally Taylor and worked for several other BBC Television outlets. He was named Royal Television Society Regional Sports Presenter of the Year in 2002.

He left BBC South in September 2011 after 14 years to replace Gordon Burns as the main anchor on North West Tonight, originally alongside Ranvir Singh and then Annabel Tiffin. Since 2020, the programme has had a single presenter, with Johnson covering Monday–Thursday.

In April 2014, Johnson anchored coverage of the 25th Anniversary Service for the Hillsborough Disaster. The programme was named Best Regional News Programme at the Royal Television Society North West Awards. Johnson and the BBC team won the award again in 2015 for a compilation entry. The programme also won the award in 2017 for a compilation of coverage on the Manchester Arena Bombing, in which Johnson played a leading role. It won the same award in 2024 and 2025. BBC North West Tonight, presented by Johnson, was nominated for a BAFTA TV Award for News Coverage in 2014 and again in 2017. He won the Broadcast Presenter Award at the O2 Media Awards NW in 2018. He was named Best Presenter at the Royal Television Society NW Awards in 2023. He won the same award – re-titled as Best Presenter of a North West Show – at the Royal Television Society Awards in 2025.

From 2009 to 2011, he was a regular relief presenter on the BBC News Channel, presenting a variety of shifts during the week and at weekends. He broke the news of the death of singer Amy Winehouse. He also presented BBC World simulcasts on the Norwegian shootings by Anders Behring Breivik and the start of western bombing operations in Libya in 2011.

Johnson has also been a regular reporter on the BBC's Match of the Day and Final Score programmes. He was part of the Match of the Day reporting team at the 2010 FIFA World Cup in South Africa.

Since 2012, he has been a regular presenter of BBC Breakfast on Sundays. He has also presented Saturday, weekday and Bank Holiday editions of the programme.

Johnson is a patron of The Dianne Oxberry Trust, an ovarian cancer charity established in memory of his late colleague. He has been a patron of Willowbrook Hospice in Prescot on Merseyside, England. He was also a patron of Southampton charity the Rose Road Association's 'Change My Life' appeal and was a supporter of Naomi House Children's Hospice, for whom he hosted a range of fund-raising events.

Johnson is married to Lucy and they have three children. He lives in Hale, Greater Manchester.
