= BBC South Today =

British TV news programme (since 1961)

- Title card used since April 2022
- Theme music composer: David Lowe
- Country of origin: United Kingdom
- Original language: English

Production
- Producers: BBC News; BBC South
- Production locations: Southampton, England, UK
- Camera setup: Multi-camera
- Running time: 30 minutes (main 6:30 pm programme); 10 minutes (1:30 pm and 10:30 pm programmes); Various (on weekends and Breakfast)

Original release
- Network: BBC One South
- Release: 7 January 1961 – present

Related
- BBC News, ITV News Meridian

BBC South Today is the BBC's regional television news service for the south of England, covering Hampshire, Isle of Wight, Berkshire, Oxfordshire, West Sussex, much of Dorset and parts of Surrey and Wiltshire. The service is produced and broadcast from the BBC South's Broadcasting House on Havelock Road in Southampton with district newsrooms based in Brighton, Dorchester, Guildford, Oxford, Reading, and Swindon.

From 2000 to 2022, an opt-out of the main programme also covered Oxfordshire, parts of Wiltshire, small parts of eastern Gloucestershire, western Buckinghamshire and southern Northamptonshire. The same geographical area continues to be served by ITV Meridian News for the Thames Valley.

== Overview ==
When the BBC introduced regional television news on 30 September 1957, viewers in the South were initially served by a five-minute bulletin from Bristol shared with what would become the BBC West and BBC South West regions.

For geographical reasons, the timeslot for regional news initially had to be shared with a bulletin for Wales, before being replaced by a separate bulletin devoted to news from the South of England at the start of 1958.

On 30 July 1958, the BBC's director general Ian Jacob officially opened the corporation's new Southampton television studio, initially based at the city's Guildhall – the first regional studio to be based outside the main centres. The opening occurred a month before the launch of the rival ITV service provided by Southern Television.

By January 1961, BBC South had been split off from the West Region and began to provide longer regional bulletins of its own – four months before the launch of Southern's rival news magazine Day by Day. Television operations in Southampton soon moved to the BBC studios at South Western House, the former Cunard shipping line headquarters near the city's docks.

On 17 September 1962, an extended 20-minute timeslot for regional news saw the launch of South at Six, before it was renamed during the 1960s as South Today. The programme went onto form part of Nationwide in 1969 and its short-lived successor Sixty Minutes in 1983.

In September 1991, BBC South moved its Southampton headquarters to a new purpose-built broadcasting centre in Havelock Road.

South at Six's presenter was Martin Muncaster. Bruce Parker joined South Today in 1967 and remained as the main anchor until 1992, continuing to present and contribute as Political Editor until 2003.

The previous main presenter, Sally Taylor, started co-presenting the programme in 1987 (replacing Debbie Thrower), initially alongside Parker and then successively with Paddy Haycocks, Mark Longhurst, Harry Gration, Andrew Harvey and Roger Finn.

Currently, BBC South Today produces 11 bulletins each weekday: six bulletins in the morning during BBC Breakfast, a 15-minute programme at 13:30, the half-hour main programme at 18:30 and a late night bulletin (Monday to Thursday at 22:30. Weekend news bulletins are also broadcast. These include early evening bulletins on Saturday and Sunday and a late night bulletin on Sundays, following the BBC News at Ten. The times of these bulletins usually vary.

Prior to September 2001, BBC South Today's region included areas served by the Heathfield transmitter and its relays which covered eastern Sussex and southern Kent. These areas are now covered by the BBC's South East Today from studios in Tunbridge Wells.

Following digital switchover on 7 March 2012, the Whitehawk Hill transmitter which primarily serves Brighton and Hove switched from broadcasting BBC South Today to broadcasting the neighbouring South East Today. However the transmitter still continues to provide the ITV1 Meridian news service for the western part of the region, based in Southampton.

== Oxford opt-out ==
Between 16 October 2000 and 16 December 2022, BBC South produced a distinct news service for the area served by the Oxford transmitter. Previously, the area was covered by Newsroom South East, which also served Greater London and the south east. As part of a three-tier restructure of regional coverage, the Oxford transmitter area was transferred to the BBC South region and began dedicated opt-out bulletins within BBC South Today. A year later, London and the south east split into two distinct regions: BBC London and BBC South East.

Originally, BBC South Today Oxford was broadcast from BBC South's Studio B in Southampton. Studio production of the bulletins was transferred in 2004 to the reception area at Radio Oxford while a new television studio and production gallery was built. The programme was produced and broadcast from Oxford from October 2005 until December 2022. Geraldine Peers presented the programme from May 2001 until the programme ended on 16 December 2022.

On 21 April 2008, the BBC South Today Oxford opt-out service was renamed as BBC Oxford News (referred to on-screen as BBC Oxford). New titles and graphics were introduced as part of an on-screen overhaul across the BBC's national, international and regional news services. From 29 October 2012, this was re-branded back to BBC South Today.

=== Weekday bulletins ===
The Oxford sub-opt covered the first 10–15 minutes of the main evening BBC South Today at 6:30pm, before joining Sally Taylor for the latter part of the Southampton edition of the programme. Until April 2013, a full 30-minute Oxford edition was produced every Friday evening, but this was scaled back to 10–15 minutes. Special half-hour Oxford editions were still occasionally broadcast if there was a major news story in the sub-region.

Viewers in these areas also received dedicated bulletins after the BBC News at Ten, but saw pan-regional bulletins from Southampton at breakfast and lunchtime and on weekends. The 30-second update at 8 pm was produced and presented from Oxford for the entirety of its run. From 2007 there was also at 3:20 pm (later 3 pm) a short regional update which was also produced and presented from Oxford until the bulletin was ended.

On 26 May 2022, it was announced that the BBC proposed to close the Oxford opt (and the equivalent produced in Cambridge). The final programme, a 30-minute special aired at 6.30 pm on 16 December 2022.

== Coverage area ==
The programme still continue to broadcast across Hampshire, Isle of Wight, Oxfordshire, Berkshire, West Sussex, much of Dorset and parts of Surrey and Wiltshire (including Salisbury and Swindon), small parts of eastern Gloucestershire, western Buckinghamshire and southern Northamptonshire.

Freeview viewers in Guildford, Farnham, Henley and Aldershot receive better television signals from the Crystal Palace transmitter which broadcast London News and viewers in parts of Dorset including Weymouth and Isle of Portland receive Spotlight from the Stockland Hill transmitter. Most of Worthing receive its television signals from the Whitehawk Hill transmitter that broadcast South East Today.

However, those areas are given South Today on Channel 101 through satellite television such as Freesat as default via the towns' postcodes.

South east of Wiltshire such as Salisbury and parts of the Salisbury Plains is covered by South Today from the Hannington transmitter and the Salisbury relay transmitter which is transmitted via the Rowridge transmitter.

Most of Swindon is covered by Points West with their television signals receive from the Mendip transmitter, some eastern parts of the town cannot receive signals from the Mendip transmitter but can receive the Oxford transmitter which broadcast South Today.

== Presenters ==
There are a range of returning reporters to the show, however, the following are the most reoccurring presenters:

=== Alexis Green ===
Green first joined CBBC as a runner in 2004, before then going to work as a floor manager at Channel 4 News and a camera operator at Channel 5 News. Green then moved to presenting on the radio in 2006, being a presenter for local BBC radio, as well as commercial radio. She then joined ITV London/GMTV and BBC Radio 5 Live, presenting the traffic and travel. It was during this time that she trained as a journalist, joining South Today in 2008. As of 2008, she presents the weather.

=== Allen Sinclair ===
Sinclair had worked for South Today as a presenter since 1997, presenting the early-evening news and other news bulletins. He has covered the war in Afghanistan and Iraq, natural disasters in Asia and Africa and major sporting events in Europe and China. He has skills in self-filming and self-editing journalism which led to covering the major news events.

=== David Allard ===
Allard started working for the BBC as a newsreader and sports reporter for BBC Radio Solent. He started presenting the news in 2000, as well as having experience having presented and produced network news on major national stories.

=== Edward Sault ===
Sault was born and raised in the Channel Islands. He presents and reports for South Today, either filming and editing himself or working with camera crews.

=== Jo Kent ===
Kent started as a radio presenter for the BBC in Guernsey, before her first TV presenting role in Norwich for the regional BBC news programme. She has also worked for BBC Radio 5 Live, BBC News and BBC Sport. She joined South Today as a presenter in 2004.

=== Anjana Gadgil ===
BBC South Today reporter Anjana Gadgil is from Portsmouth. She is a marathon runner, and took part in the London Marathon in 2024.

=== Lewis Coombes ===
Coombes started at BBC Radio Solent in 2007, working a variety of roles, predominantly the producer of the breakfast show. In 2013, he started as a presenter on South Today, specialising in sport. He has covered Wimbledon, the Olympics, Wembley cup finals and the Women's Euros. He has previously been named RTC Regional Journalist of the Year and Sports Presenter of the Year.

=== Notable presenters & alumni ===
- Sally Taylor MBE presented South Today, since 1987. She retired from the programme on 20 March 2025 after 38 years.
- Mark Longhurst – Most recently presented the news for GB News, until October 2023.
- Roger Johnson – Now presents the news for BBC North West Tonight.
- Dani Sinha – Now a regular presenter of 5 News.
- Reham Khan – Former weather presenter who went on to marry former Pakistani Prime Minister Imran Khan.
- Alex Forsyth – Former presenter and home affairs correspondent who now presents Radio 4's Any Questions?
- Jenni Murray – reporter and presenter for South Today in the 1970s before Woman's Hour
