= Vertical seat =

Airline seat configuration

The vertical seat (standing seat, stand-up seat) is an airline seat configuration, created in 2003 by Airbus, canvassed to Asian carriers in 2006, and promoted by Ryanair as well as Spirit Airlines in 2010. The configuration involves standing passengers travelling while being braced in position.

The configuration and all designs have not yet been approved by regulatory agencies. There is no bar to such a configuration in Federal Aviation Administration (US) regulations. However, according to Transport Canada (the agency responsible for aviation safety in Canada), vertical seats do not conform to Canadian seating requirements.

In 2006, Airbus was quietly polling airlines to see about the viability of a perch seat, which it had created in 2003.

In 2010, Ryanair promulgated a vertical seat design for use in its aircraft. Both the European Aviation Safety Agency and UK Civil Aviation Authority were skeptical as to the design being able to meet licensing requirements. The design was expected to start undergoing safety trials in the 2011–2012 time frame. It has already been rejected by Boeing, as it believes that the design would not meet the 16G regulatory requirement. Tigerair Australia announced that it would also pursue the Ryanair design, as has its parent, Tigerair. According to UK aviation law, passengers require a seat belt on landing and takeoff, so the lack of a seat may preclude the design from being legal in the UK. The Ryanair design would have passengers perched on a narrow shelf, with their weight taken up by their legs, and their back against the seatback, strapped in, with additional shoulder restraints similar to roller coaster overhead restraints.

The configuration is superficially similar to the SkyRider saddle seat design proposed by Aviointeriors.

In 2015, Chinese airline Spring Airlines expressed interest in using the vertical seat concept for consumer flights. In 2018, the Italian company Aviointeriors revealed its design for vertical seats. In 2026, Chaise Lounge built the prototype for the concept of their vertical seat and presented it in the Aircraft Interiors Expo
