= Henville =

Henville is an English surname. It originated as a variant of the surname Envill, or potentially as a variant of Henfield. Notable people with the surname include:

- Troy Archibald-Henville (born 1988), English footballer and coach
- Sandra Lee Henville (born 1938), American child actress

== See also ==
- Charles Henville Bayly (1807–1873), English cricketer and priest
- William Henville Burford (1807–1895), English-Australian businessman
