= Sally Taylor =

Sally Taylor may refer to:

- Sally Taylor (musician) (born 1974), American musician and advocate for the victims of land mines
- Sally Taylor (TV presenter) (born 1957), British news presenter, long-serving on south of England regional news for the BBC
- Sally Taylor-Isherwood, Canadian actress
