= Annabel Tiffin =

English broadcast journalist and presenter

- Born: Southampton, Hampshire, England
- Occupation: Newsreader
- Years active: 1990–present
- Notable credit: Presenter/producer for BBC North West Tonight

Annabel Tiffin is an English broadcast journalist and presenter, currently working as a main presenter and producer for the BBC One regional television news programme North West Tonight.

Tiffin presents the main 6:30 pm programme, alternating with Roger Johnson, as well as weekday late news bulletins and the North West edition of the weekly political programme Sunday Politics.

== Early life ==
Tiffin was born in Southampton, Hampshire, but went to school in Cirencester and then London. She moved to Manchester during her year off, but immediately found employment with a newspaper in Moss Side and so decided not to go to university. Her father was Peter Tiffin, a television director and producer for over 30 years. She has two sisters.

== Career ==
Tiffin moved to Manchester in 1990, and began working at the Stockport Express Advertiser. She then moved into local radio, working for Signal Radio in Stoke and BRMB in Birmingham, before becoming a presenter and reporter for the local cable television station, Birmingham Live TV, on which Tiffin was the first person on air in 1995. After 18 months, she moved to Central Independent Television in Nottingham and became a reporter and bulletin presenter for Central News East.

Tiffin joined BBC North West in 2003 as a presenter and producer for the late North West Tonight bulletin on weekdays. She later became a regular stand-in anchor on the main evening programme, before becoming a main anchor in May 2012 to replace Ranvir Singh. Alongside regional news, she has also worked on regional current affairs series Inside Out North West and Politics Show as well as coverage of local and general elections.

In July 2020, the BBC announced that 450 jobs would be lost in English regional television, as well as current affairs, local radio and online news. More than a thousand people signed a petition to save the long-standing partnership between Tiffin and Roger Johnson. However, the pairing, as joint anchors for North West Tonight, came to an end, with both presenting separately since then. Tiffin started her second stint presenting Politics North West on 16 May 2021.

Tiffin received an honorary Doctor of Arts degree from the University of Bolton for her outstanding contribution to broadcasting in 2022.

== Awards ==
Tiffin has presented award-winning programmes on subjects as wide-ranging as Hillsborough, the Dale Cregan trial and the Manchester Arena bombing. She has been nominated for two Baftas and has also won numerous Royal Television Society awards.

== Personal life ==
Tiffin lives in Cheadle Hulme in Stockport, with her husband and two children.
