= Badger Watch =

1977 BBC wildlife television programme

Badger Watch was a British live wildlife television programme broadcast on BBC One in May 1977. Presented by Bruce Parker, with contributions from naturalists Phil Drabble and Ernest Neal, the programme used infrared cameras to show live pictures from a badger sett, allowing viewers to observe nocturnal behaviour in real time.

"The advent of television's 'eye in the night' was a major technical advance in its ability to observe natural events under conditions roughly equivalent to bright moonlight. Night by night, with recordings and live pictures, a simple diary of family life was built up."

'There's no denying the sense of wonder at being able to see the nocturnal creatures, blithely going about their innocent business, through the invention of "a black light", an invisible light through which only the camera can see'

The programme was transmitted over several consecutive evenings during the week beginning 10 May 1977, in a late-evening slot following the Nine O'Clock News.

== Format ==
Badger Watch combined live outside broadcasting with on-site presentation and expert commentary. Infrared cameras were used to observe badgers emerging from their sett after dark, an unusual technical achievement for British television at the time.

== Significance ==
The programme is notable as an early example of live wildlife broadcasting on British television and for its use of infrared technology to film nocturnal animals. It has been described as the precursor to later BBC live wildlife formats such as Springwatch.

'Not since Mission Control used to declare "We have lift-off" in the brave days of space exploration has the live outside broadcast attained the expectancy of the nightly Badger Watch'

Because the programme was short-lived and not widely repeated, surviving documentation is limited largely to contemporary listings and archive references.

== Personnel ==
- Bruce Parker – presenter
- Phil Drabble – contributor
- Ernest Neal – contributor
- Peter Bale - producer

== See also ==
- Springwatch
- BBC Natural History Unit
