= Coppenhall Junction railway accident =

1962 disaster in the United Kingdom

Coppenhall Junction rail crash

Details
- Date: 26 December 1962; 18:01
- Location: Coppenhall Junction, Cheshire
- Coordinates: 53.1684°N 2.4778°W
- Country: England
- Line: West Coast Main Line
- Operator: British Railways
- Cause: Signal passed at danger

Statistics
- Trains: 2
- Passengers: ~800
- Deaths: 18
- Injured: 34

On 26 December 1962, two trains collided near Coppenhall Junction, United Kingdom, killing 18 people and injuring 34. On that evening, cold weather and snow in and around Crewe had caused points to become frozen and trains were being detained at signals. About midway between Winsford and Crewe, the 13:30 Glasgow Central to London Euston Mid-Day Scot, hauled by an English Electric type 4 diesel, D215, with 13 coaches and 500 passengers, was stopped at a signal but the driver found the telephone to Coppenhall Junction, the next signal box ahead, out of order. Seeing the next signal ahead he decided to proceed down towards it and use the telephone there, but too fast. In the darkness he failed to notice the 16:45 express from Liverpool Lime Street to Birmingham New Street, hauled by an electric locomotive with eight coaches with 300 passengers, standing on the line ahead and collided with it at about 20 mph (32 km/h).

== Trains and line ==
The 4:45 PM Birmingham train consisted of an electric locomotive (Note: The report does not specify what locomotive type this was beyond an 'electric locomotive'.) hauling eight Mark 1 coaches. The final two cars of this train telescoped. The seventh carriage was a 1959 Open Second and the eighth was a 1960 Corridor Second Brake. All coaches were connected with buckeye couplings. The train was operated by Driver Hedgcock, with fireman Kelly.

The 1:30 PM Glasgow-Euston was a Mid-Day Scot hauled by an English Electric type 4 diesel, D215, with air brakes on the locomotive and vacuum brakes on the thirteen coaches. (Note: The report doesn't provide any further information on the coaches of this train.) All coaches were connected with buckeye couplings. The train was operated by Driver Russell, with fireman McCallum.

The location consisted of a pair of fast and slow main lines, two in the 'Up' direction (towards Crewe) and 'Down' direction (towards Liverpool). The signals in the area were mainly automatic four aspect colour light signals, and all lines were equipped with track circuit and Automatic Warning System. The area was overseen by Coppenhall Junction Signal Box, staffed by Signalman Sutton at the time of the collision. The area also had overhead line equipment and electrification telephones.

== Lead up to the collision ==
At 5:26 PM, the Birmingham train passed Winsford Station signal box. The signalman observed the tail lamp illuminated and average intensity. The train was first held at Signal No. 114, and the driver made contact via signal post telephone with Signalman Sutton, who required him to wait until a favourable aspect. After an undetermined time, the signal changed to a single yellow 'caution' aspect. The train proceeded forward to Signal No. 110 and was again held. The signal post telephone was not working on either the slow or fast up line signals. The fireman eventually contacted Signalman Sutton via the down slow line's telephone, and was again instructed to wait for a favourable aspect. The signal had changed to single yellow and the driver had released the brakes when the collision occurred.

At 5:51 PM, the Mid-day Scot passed Winsford Station Box. Signal No. 114 was displayed 'Danger' due to the Birmingham train being held ahead at Signal No. 110. Fireman McCallum attempted to use the telephone on Signal No. 114 and No. 116 but found they were not working. Driver Russell then attempted to use the telephones with no success either.

Driver Russell recalled a supplemental instruction on electrified lines that required them to make contact with the signalman. Russell later stated that the line ahead looked clear to Signal No. 110, the next signal, so he elected to proceed forward at 5–6 miles per hour (8.0–9.7 km/h).

== The collision ==
At 6:01 the Mid-day Scot rear-ended the stationary Birmingham train. The inquest estimated based on damage to rail vehicles, time taken to travel between known points such as Winsford Signal Box, and track circuit activation, to be travelling at 20 miles per hour (32 km/h). Driver Russell was insistent through the inquiry, in multiple interviews, that the train never reached this speed, even when presented with evidence agreeing with the roughly 20 miles per hour (32 km/h) speed.

== Post accident response ==
Driver Hedgcock of the Birmingham train called the signalman via the signal post telephone at Down Fast signal No. 101 and requested ambulances, stating there were "bodies and injured people on the line" and for help to be urgently sent to the scene. Signalman Sutton failed, for reasons never fully explained, to understand the seriousness and severity of the accident. At 6:19 PM Porter Leigh at Winsford Station called Coppenhall Junction signal box about the overdue local train. Signalman Sutton told the porter about the accident and that was not sure of the location beyond it being near a former station, Minshull Vernon, and that he did not think the accident was serious. After completing the call, Porter Leigh called emergency services at 6:34 PM.

Station Master Staley was made aware of the accident by a track worker, sent by Signalman Sutton at his house near the station. The Station Master Staley went to the station attempted to contact the Traffic Control Office by telephone, but was unable as their line was busy. He proceeded to Coppenhall Junction signal box, and placed another call to emergency services at 6:45 PM to clarify the location of the accident, and request the full emergency procedure be implemented. He was not aware of the severity of the accident at the time, and only became aware when he arrived at the accident scene shortly after 7:00 PM.

The fire and ambulance had located the scene due to a phone call placed by Ticket Collector Mulhearn of the Mid-day Scot, who had gone to a farm and placed a call via their telephone.

Passing motorists aligned their cars so that their headlights illuminated the scene, to aid rescuers. The cattle-shed at a nearby farm was used as a temporary mortuary.

The accident had been cleared away and all lines reopened at 2:10 on 27 December.

== Casualties ==
The collision killed 18 passengers; 33 other passengers and one railwayman, the guard of the Birmingham train, were seriously injured. All these casualties were in the two rear coaches of the Liverpool train, which were telescoped after a coupling fractured.

== Investigation ==
The official Ministry of Transport investigation in to the accident was led by Colonel D. McMullen, who submitted his report in June 1963.

=== Driver conduct and speedometers ===
The investigation suspected that Driver Russell either misread the speedometer, which did not have any marks between 0 and 10 miles per hour and the 10 mile per hour mark was not labelled, with the first labelled mark being at 20 miles per hour, or did not use the speedometer and attempted to estimate his speed, as had been common practice on steam locomotives. It was noted that various differences in how steam locomotives and diesel locomotives worked, would make doing this much trickier in practice. So, efforts should be made to improve driver usage of speedometers. The report recommended that the 10 mile per hour marking be labelled on speedometers.

=== Railway Rules ===
The investigation also put a focus on railway rules and tail lamps. Rule 55 contained two sets of language that the investigation identified as leaving the door open to this accident occurring. One recommendation was to emphasise the use of speedometers in diesel and electric locomotives instead of attempting to estimate speeds. Another was that drivers should have practical training in 'stop and proceed' operation to better learn the skills needed.

The other issue identified was the rule which allows a driver to pass a red signal when they can't communicate with the signalman but "can see or ascertain that the line is clear to the next stop signal". The wording of the rule left interpretation as to what constituted "can see or ascertain that the line is clear". It was the opinion of the investigation that a driver can't see the line is clear in darkness or fog. At the time of the accident it was dark. It was recommended that the rule be expanded and clarified to better define when it was permissible to pass a signal at danger.

=== Tail lamps ===
At the time, British Rail was still utilising oil tail lamps, which, while visible from a distance of up to 400 yards (370 m), were difficult to observe in the bright light of newly installed colour light signals. It was remarked how, despite the developments in locomotive and illumination technology, including railway signals, the oil tail lamp had changed little in a century. It was now time to move on to electric tail lamps, given the fact the tail lamp was the last line of defence against a rear end collision.

=== Delayed response ===
The report was troubled by the length of time between the initial report of the accident at 6:05 PM and the first call to emergency services at 6:34 PM. This failed to convey the severity of the incident. This was followed by a call at 6:45 to clarify the location of the accident. The fire service and ambulances that had arrived on the scene around 7:00 PM had been made aware of the location by a telephone call placed by a ticket collector at a local farm.

The report also noted that two staff failed to identify an electrification telephone beside the crash scene. The telephone automatically calls the railway electrical control room and is intended for electric staff, Both train crew members walked past it in search of a telephone. A third knew of it, but elected not to use it. The report suggested that train staff be instructed to use these phones in an emergency.

Emergency services had difficulty in locating the accident site. Signalman Sutton while informed of what signal the train accident occurred at had no way of knowing the actual location of that signal. With distances between signal boxes increasing due to railway signal modernisation, the report recommended that either signal boxes should have diagrams with all signals in their territory marked, or maps that signal locations and numbers be provided to emergency service control centres.

The report considered, but ultimately recommended against, the inclusion of powerful headlamps on locomotives to illuminate obstructions. This was not recommended due to issues of lights blinding drivers of passing trains, and excessive curves on the railway network reducing the effectiveness of headlamps. (Note: At the time of this accident, headlamps on trains were intended to communicate information about the type of train (slow freight, express passenger, local freight, etc) and not intended to illuminate the tracks ahead.) Also considered were the inclusion of wireless telephones or radio to enable a driver to contact the signalman from the cab. These were not recommended because of the rareness of failure of telephones, and the cost of implementing the system.
