= Victoria Warehouse =

Live music venue in Old Trafford, Manchester

O2 Victoria Warehouse
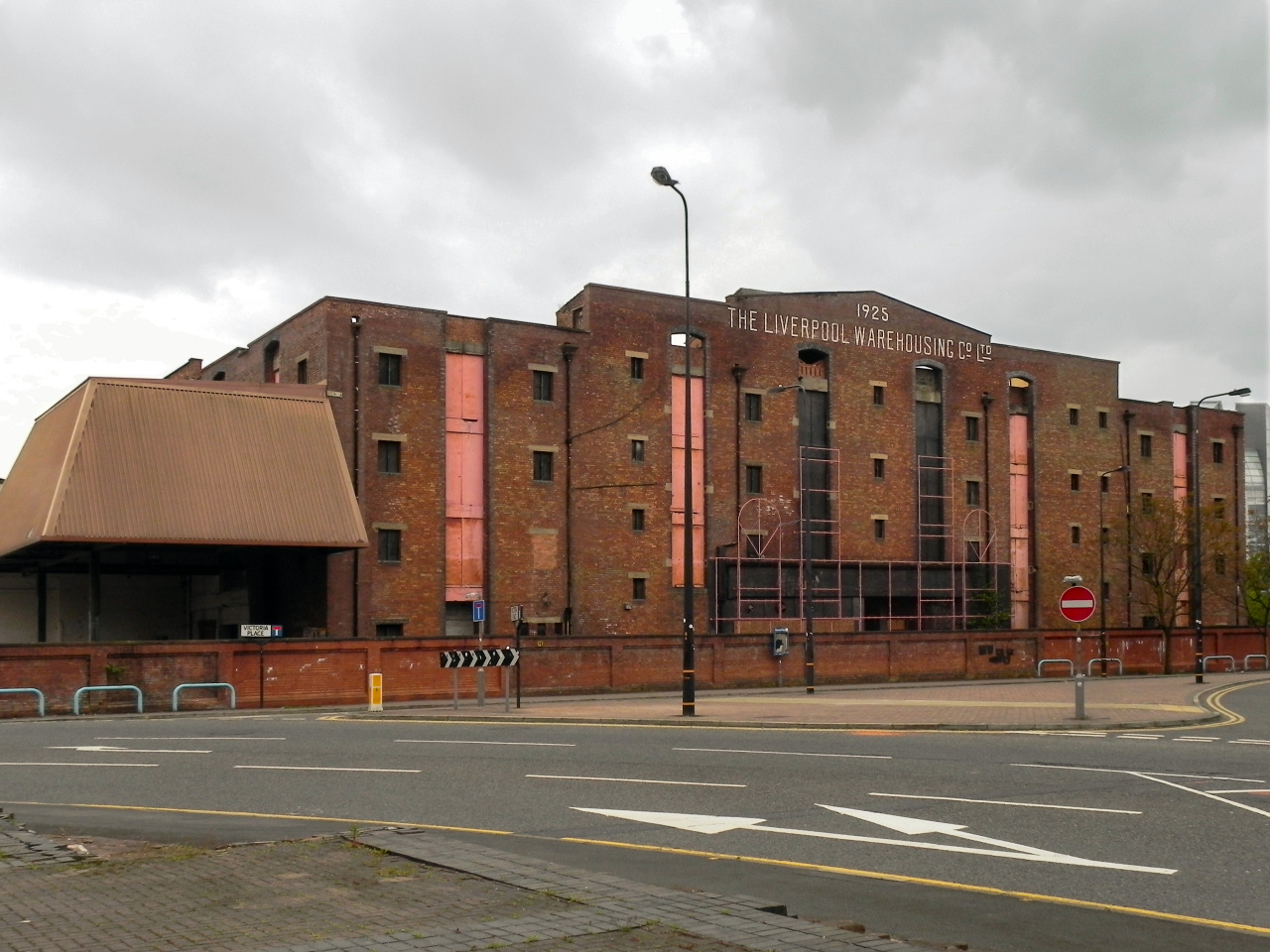
- Former names: Victoria Warehouse
- Location: Trafford Wharf Rd, Old Trafford, Greater Manchester, England
- Coordinates: 53.4643°N 2.2849°W
- Operator: Academy Music Group
- Capacity: 3,500

Construction
- Built: 1925
- Opened: 2012
- Renovated: 2009

Website
- victoriawarehouse.com

The O2 Victoria Warehouse is a live music venue in Old Trafford, Greater Manchester, England. The venue is made up of two storage warehouses used during the early to mid-20th century. It was redeveloped as a music venue in 2012 and given its current name in 2018.

== Location ==
The venue is on the banks of the Bridgewater Canal in Old Trafford, behind a stone quay.

== History ==
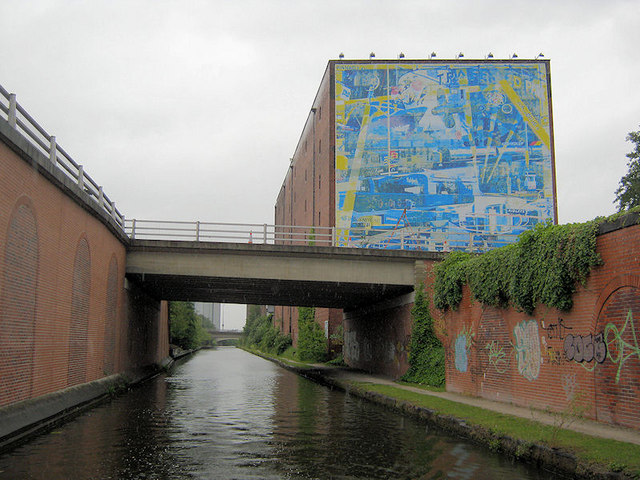
Walter Kershaw's mural

The premises began construction in the 1920s by the Liverpool Warehousing Company as a storage facility for the city, with the two warehouses opening in 1925 and 1927, respectively. The site covered 300,000 square feet (28,000 m^{2}). It was later used for food storage, before being largely destroyed by fire in 1980.

In 1982, a mural by Walter Kershaw was drawn on the storage buildings, showing the industries in Trafford Park, as well as players from nearby Manchester United F.C. It was replaced with a second mural on 1 November 1993, also by Kershaw, featuring updated images. The mural had to be temporarily dismantled in 2006 over health and safety concerns. The mural was subsequently renovated and restored, before being removed again in 2014. The site was purchased by developers in 2009 and the buildings reconstructed with modern facilities. It opened on 8 April 2012, and acquired a wedding licence in August 2015.

On 14 May 2015, the then Chancellor of the Exchequer, George Osborne, gave a speech at the venue entitled "Building a Northern Powerhouse" and covered the government's proposed redevelopment of cities in Northern England.

The venue was renamed the O2 Victoria Warehouse as part of a longstanding deal between Live Nation Entertainment who own Academy Music Group, and O2.

== Events ==
The venue has attracted several major music artists, including Thom Yorke, Sam Fender, Lizzo and Bladee.

In October 2019, following noise complaints at the nearby Bowlers Exhibition Centre, a representative from Academy Music Group said that all Victoria Warehouse events are attended by an acoustic engineer monitoring noise levels, and that they received no direct complaints.
