= Henfield (surname) =

Henfield is a surname. Notable people with the surname include:

- Darren Henfield, Bahamian politician
- Martin Henfield, British broadcaster

== See also ==
- Heyfield
