= Bruce Parker =

British journalist

Bruce Parker (MBE)
- Born: Bruce Rodney Wingate Parker
- Occupations: Journalist, television presenter
- Years active: mid 1960s–2003
- Known for: Antiques Roadshow

Bruce Rodney Wingate Parker, MBE is a British journalist and television presenter.

== Career ==
Strongly committed to regional broadcasting in the mid 1960s, he was responsible for a pilot local radio station in the Channel Islands, which partly led to the setting up of a string of BBC local radio stations across the UK. In 1967 he joined BBC South in Southampton as a television journalist, where he remained for most of his career, making a name as the main presenter and reporter for South Today for 37 years, which was then a record stint for any regional presenter in the UK. He was also a respected political interviewer and as BBC South's political editor, he hosted South of Westminster and South on Sunday.

In the 1970s he became a familiar face to viewers in the rest of Britain, first as a network news reporter and later as the first host of Antiques Roadshow (which he helped set up with Robin Drake) and a regular contributor to and presenter of Nationwide. He also presented the BBC1 arts magazine Mainstream and Badger Watch (the forerunner of the BBC's natural history 'watch' series of programmes) and a number of Songs of Praise editions in the 1970s and 1980s. He was the main BBC commentator for the raising of the Mary Rose in October 1982, clips of which regularly appear on nostalgia and retrospective programmes. He also presented a number of programmes on Radio 4 including The Week's Antiques, which he devised, and the regional Today from the South and West. He has won several Royal Television Society awards.

He is the author of Everybody's Soapbox (with Nigel Farrell), The History of Elizabeth College and A History of Guernsey Full-Bore Rifle Shooting. To commemorate the 80th anniversary of the Liberation of the Channel Islands from the German Occupation, he wrote Exile: The Evacuation of Elizabeth College.

A keen rifle-shot since his schooldays when he became Public Schools' small-bore champion and UK cadet forces champion, he achieved further successes at Bisley's Imperial Meeting.

Brought up in Guernsey, Parker was educated at Elizabeth College Guernsey followed by the University of Wales and the University of Reading. He was chairman of the Friends of Winchester Cathedral for fifteen years and is a cathedral trustee. He also chaired two educational charities in Guernsey, the Elizabeth College Foundation and the Gibson Fleming Trust and was a trustee of the Countess of Brecknock Hospice in Andover.

He was created MBE in 2017, an Honorary Fellow of Winchester University in 2018 and a Companion of St Swithun at Winchester Cathedral in 2023

Preceded by N/A	Host of Antiques Roadshow; 1979	Succeeded by Angela Rippon
