= The Caledonian =

Glasgow to London named train

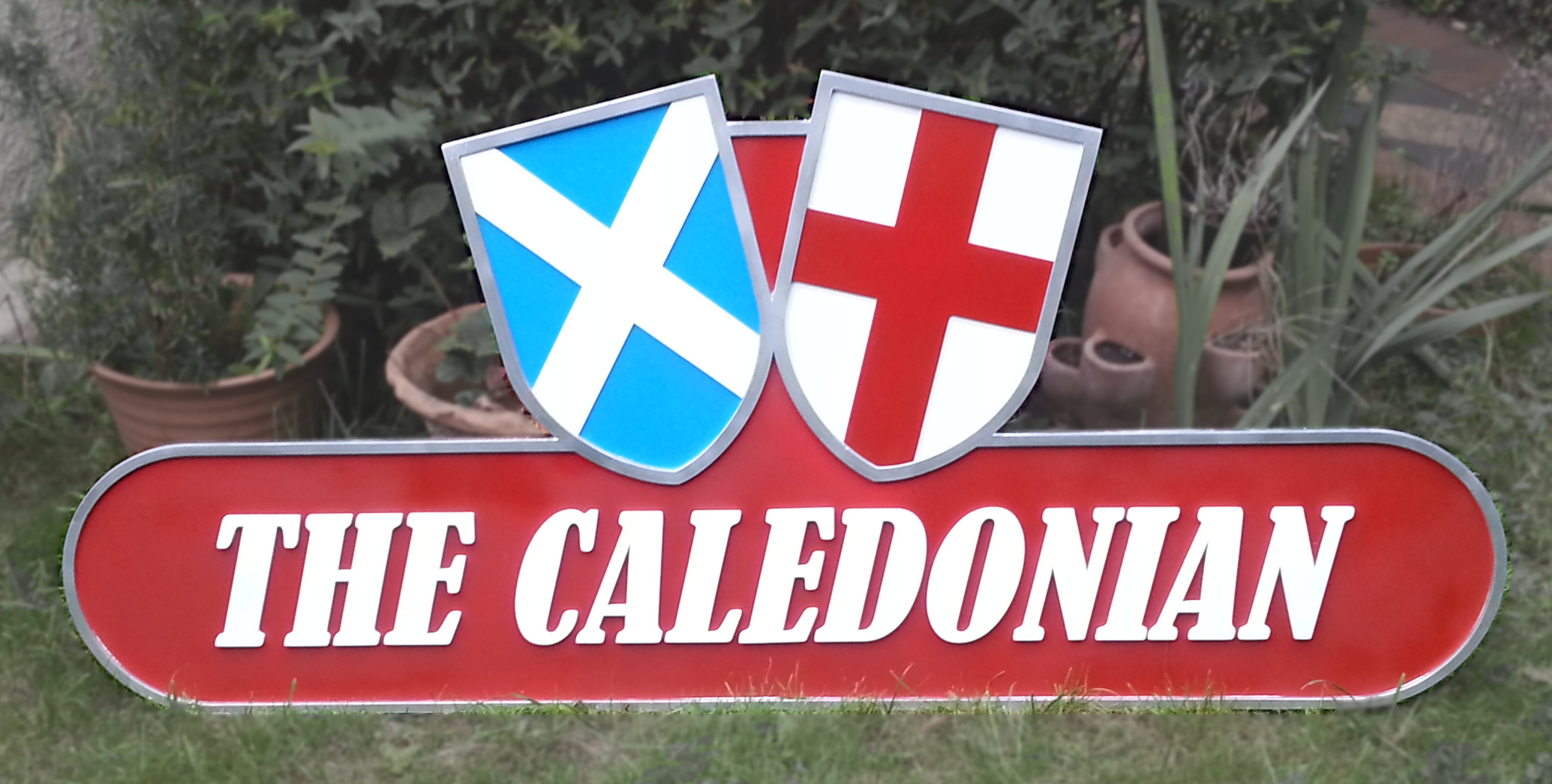
The Caledonian headboard

The Caledonian was a British express passenger train of the 1950s and 1960s running between Glasgow Central and London Euston, up in the morning, due into London in mid-afternoon, and down in the afternoon, with a Glasgow arrival in the late evening. It was operated by the London Midland Region of British Railways and was non-stop between Carlisle and London.

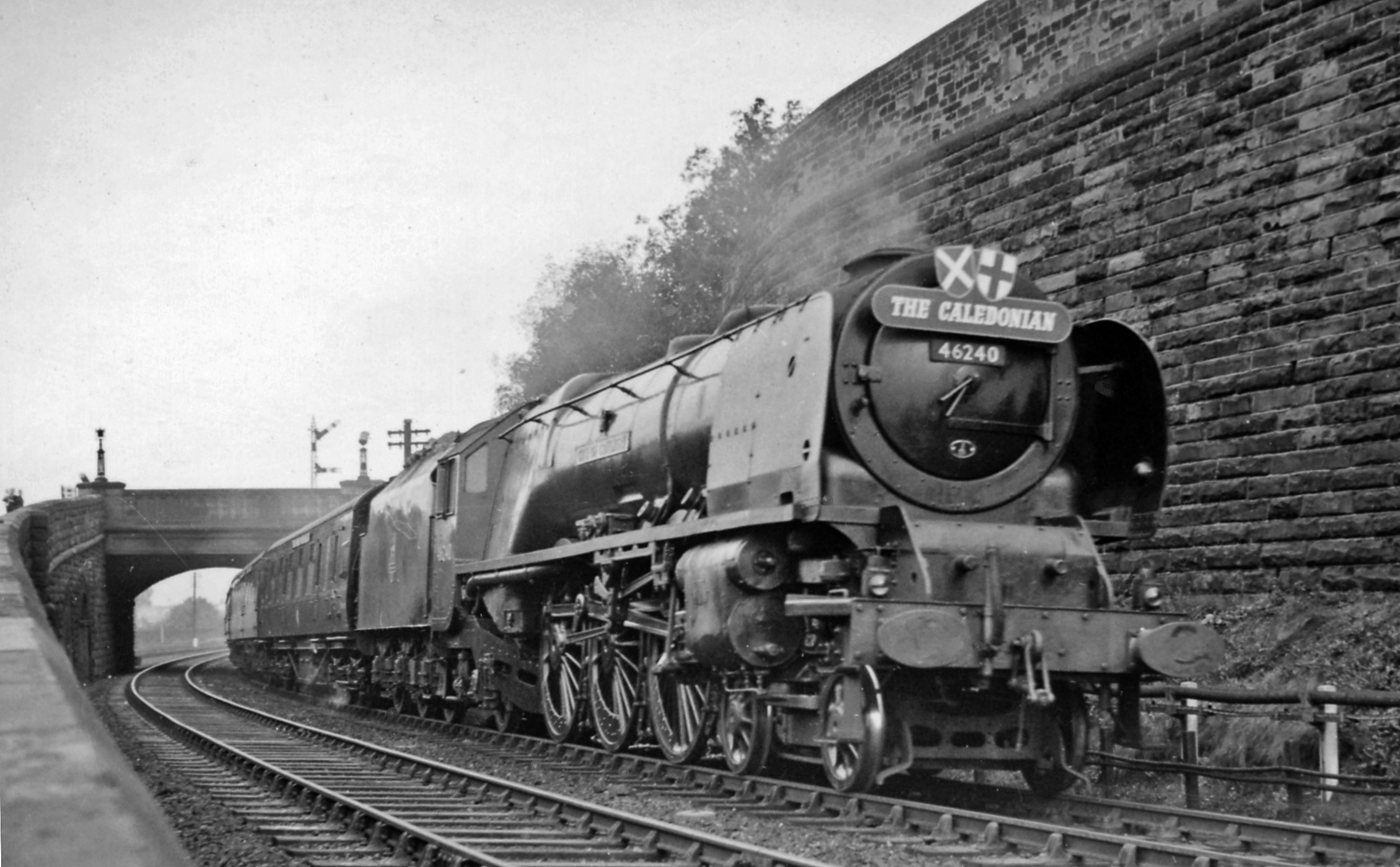
Coronation pacific 46240 City of Coventry with The Caledonian at Carlisle in 1957

The service was introduced on 17 June 1957 and ran as a named express until 4 September 1964. It ran daily, although for the summer of 1958 there was a trial of running it twice daily, with morning and afternoon services in each direction.

In the timetable for winter 1959-60, the train was slowed by 25 minutes to compensate for delays during electrification work on the West Coast Main Line, for a new journey time of 7 hours 15 minutes, identical with the other two daytime named trains of the period between the two cities, the Royal Scot and the Mid-Day Scot. All three trains were restricted to eight coaches to save weight, and the number of passengers carried was limited to the seating capacity of the train, standing passengers not being permitted.

== Headboard ==
The Caledonian used a headboard of the 'Royal Scot' pattern, which had been introduced with the Royal Scot of 1950. These were large headboards, five feet wide rather than the usual three, and with a large round-ended oblong panel carrying the name, surmounted by a crest. For the Caledonian, this was the paired shields of St Andrew and St George, representing Scotland and England. This basic design was used throughout the life of the Caledonian, although there were detail variations. The first headboard was flat painted steel, later replaced by cast aluminium with a raised rim.

After diesel traction was introduced, from 1962, as usual a smaller version of the headboard was used instead. This was now of painted wood, three feet wide, and had The Caledonian split across two lines.

== See also ==
- List of named passenger trains of the United Kingdom
