= John Mundy (presenter) =

British broadcaster

John Mundy is a British broadcaster and voice-over artist, best known as a long-serving presenter of the regional news programme BBC North West Tonight and its previous incarnations as Look North and Look North West.

Mundy started in 'the business' first, as a stage-hand at the Opera House in Manchester and then as an actor at Oldham's Coliseum Theatre. His television career began with a live 'on-air' audition as a continuity announcer for Tyne Tees Television. He also announced for HTV (forerunner of ITV Wales and West) before joining BBC North West in 1974. Mundy worked as a regional continuity announcer on weekday evenings and presented news bulletins, alternating duties with Christine Burn.

Mundy stayed with BBC North West after regional continuity was axed in September 1980 and later became a main anchor of Look North West and North West Tonight, until 1995. He also worked on various non-news programmes including The Friday Show, The Young Enterprise Show, Christmas Crackers and annual North West coverage of the BBC's Children in Need appeal.

During his time with the BBC (and largely unknown to the BBC or public), Mundy was also running a parallel career as a highly successful voice-over artist.

In 1995, Mundy took a career break and went to live in the USA. For the next five years he was involved in property development which included owning and operating two hotels in Fort Lauderdale, Florida. In 2000, he returned to live in Britain and resumed his work as a voice-over artist.

Other work includes UK National TV advertising campaigns for ‘Hoover Cordless Vacuum Cleaners’, 'DiSaronno' and 'Illy Coffee' plus narration of documentaries for CNN and National Geographic Channel including ‘The Plot To Kill Hitler’, ‘The Mistake That Killed Hitler’, ‘Britain’s Most Haunted Pubs’ and ‘Harry Kane - Against The Odds’.
