= Dave Guest =

English journalist (born 1959)

Dave Guest (born June 1959) is a journalist, and until October 2020, chief reporter and occasional presenter for BBC North West Tonight.

Guest started work at the BBC in 1983 after working as a reporter at the Lancaster Guardian, the Wigan Evening Post in Wigan and for national newspapers in Manchester. He has been chief reporter at North West Tonight since 2006, having previously covered education and social affairs.

In 2009 Guest won the O2 Media Award's Broadcast Journalist of the Year for his interviews with Jessica Knight, a schoolgirl who was stabbed while walking through a park in Lancashire. In 2014 he received the judges' award for outstanding contribution at the BBC's Ruby Awards for regional television.

In September 2014 Guest was nominated for the award for Best Regional News Journalist by the Royal Television Society.

On 23 October 2020, Dave retired from his role at the BBC. On 5 June 2022 Guest returned to BBC North West Tonight to report on the attempt in Morecambe to break the world record for the longest Jubilee street party.
