= SkyRider (seat) =

Plane seat manufactured by Aviointeriors

SkyRider is an airliner saddle seat, a type of airplane seat shaped similar to a horse saddle. It was designed by the Italian firm Aviointeriors and reduces economy-class seating spacing (seat pitch) from an average of 76–81 centimetres (30–32 inches), to 58 centimetres (23 in), a 25% decrease. The creator describes it as for use for ultra-high density seating configurations, allowing up to 40% increase in passenger capacity.

The seat was designed to reduce ticket prices and increase profits. It is for use on flights less than three hours in duration. The company notes that cowboys ride in similar style seats for more than eight hours a day in comfort. The seat requires passengers to be seated partially upright, with their weight taken up by their legs. The seat does not recline, and leaves the occupant's knees in contact with the seat in front of them. The seat still contains a fold-down tray, and back of seat pocket, both for storage of carry-on items. The design was unveiled at the 2010 Aircraft Interiors Expo Americas on 13 September 2010, in Long Beach, California, US.

The design is superficially similar to the vertical seat design proposed by Ryanair. This stand-up seat design was met with initial skepticism by the safety and licensing authority, the European Aviation Safety Agency and the UK Civil Aviation Authority, and has not yet been licensed for use. However, the SkyRider is not expected to meet with as much regulatory resistance as the RyanAir seat.

The SkyRider seat is not currently approved by the FAA for use in the USA.
