= Aviointeriors =

Aviointeriors S.p.A.
- Type: Privately held company
- Founded: 1972
- Founder: CIFA Group
- Headquarters: Via Appia Km 66.4, Latina (in Italian), Italy
- Area served: Global
- Products: Commercial aircraft cabin interior products
- Number of employees: ±400
- Website: http://www.aviointeriors.it

Aviointeriors S.p.A. is an Italian manufacturer of airline seats. Some of Aviointeriors' competitors include BE Aerospace, Recaro, and Zodiac Aerospace.

== History ==
=== Founding ===
The company was founded as a branch of the “Uno-Pi” a home furniture company part of the CIFA (Confederazione Italiana Fabbriche Arredamento) group owned by Giovanni Pofferi [1908 –1995].

The CIFA Group included the Permaflex brand, that introduced, in 1950, spring-mattress technology in Italy. (Permaflex, during the 1960s and the 1970s, was used in Italian common language as a generic trademark for the spring-mattress).

The CIFA group, in an effort to expand the market of the furnishing sector, found an opportunity in commercial aviation with the ATLAS consortium of airlines: comprising Air France, Alitalia, All Nippon Airways, Lufthansa/Condor, Sabena and (from. January 1972) Iberia. This consortium was established to create a European common technical standard for aircraft systems and a centralized purchasing office.

Alitalia sponsored within the ATLAS consortium a joint-venture between the newborn Aviointeriors and the French Sicma. The joint-venture was established to share the aircraft cabin equipment market of the members of the ATLAS consortium.

Aviointeriors supplied seats and food trolleys for 50% of the European airlines joining ATLAS. A facility was built in Latina in 1974. The joint-venture with Sicma did not last long. Aviointeriors acquired the technical know-how to design, manufacture and sell products on its own. The company moved its headquarters from the CIFA building in Rome to the plant in Latina, where they are today.

The furnishing of the Alitalia fleet continued in the following years, but the national market was shared with another company, Alven, that Alitalia also sponsored to avoid an Italian monopoly of the cabin interiors manufacturing.

Aviointeriors expanded its market in the 1970s by developing fittings and furniture for V.I.P. Agusta helicopters and private aircraft.

=== The Alven takeover ===
At the beginning of the 1980s, the CIFA group suffered a financial crisis and Aviointeriors was put up for sale. After a first offer by Irvin Aerospace, the company was acquired in May 1986 by the Veneruso family owning the Alven which was, at that time, a competitor based near Naples.

Advanced seating products in the business class sector, helped Aviointeriors to reach the North and South American market, expanding also in the Far East.

=== Aviointeriors today ===
Today the company is focused on the seat market. A full range, from regional economy class seats to first class is produced and sold globally. Aviointerior products are installed on aircraft ranging from the 40 seats regional turboprops to the 400 seats intercontinental jetliners.

From its initial production of mechanical economy and business class seats, Aviointeriors now include in its lineup electrically actuated lie-flat seats and full-flat seats with surrounding service furniture.

Among developments is a seating concept known as SkyRider, this is a saddle-like airline seat where seat pitch is reduced to 23 inches. Aviointeriors claims that these seats allow up to 40% increase in passenger capacity.
