= BBC North West Tonight =

BBC television news programme for North West England

- Title card used since 2022
- Also known as: North West Today
- Theme music composer: David Lowe
- Country of origin: United Kingdom
- Original language: English

Production
- Producers: BBC News; BBC North West
- Production locations: Quay House, MediaCityUK
- Camera setup: Multi-camera
- Running time: 30 minutes (main 6:30 pm programme); 10 minutes (1:35 pm and 10:30 pm programmes); Various (during weekends and Breakfast)

Original release
- Network: BBC One North West
- Release: 3 September 1984 – present

Related
- Granada Reports

BBC North West Tonight (known as BBC North West Today during daytime) is the BBC's regional television news programme covering North West England and the Isle of Man. Produced by BBC North West, the programme broadcasts from the BBC's MediaCityUK studios at Salford Quays, with district newsrooms based in Liverpool, Blackburn and Chester.

== BBC North West region ==
The BBC North West region covers Cheshire, Greater Manchester, Lancashire, Merseyside, northwestern Derbyshire, northern Staffordshire, southern Cumbria, western North Yorkshire, and the Isle of Man.

The programme can be watched in any part of the United Kingdom (and Europe) from Astra 1N on Freesat channel 955 and Sky channel 958. The latest edition of BBC North West Tonight is also available to watch on BBC iPlayer for 24 hours, like the BBC's other television news bulletins.

Most of Cumbria is served by Look North that broadcast from Newcastle. Southern parts of the county such as Barrow-in-Furness and South Lakeland are still served by North West Tonight. Western North Yorkshire (Settle), northern Staffordshire (Biddulph and Kidsgrove) and northwest of Derbyshire (Buxton, Glossop, New Mills and Chapel-en-le-Frith) get their signals from the Winter Hill TV transmitter that broadcast North West Tonight rather than the neighbouring regions of Look North, Midlands Today and East Midlands Today.

== History ==
BBC television news from Manchester began on 30 September 1957, with a nightly bulletin entitled News from the North, broadcast to the whole of Northern England from the Holme Moss and Pontop Pike transmitters.

The rival ITV station, Granada Television, had already begun providing regional news coverage when it began broadcasting in May 1956, at first covering the North West only before extending to Yorkshire six months later.

For the first two years, the short weeknight bulletins were produced and broadcast from the BBC's Dickenson Road television studio at Rusholme in south Manchester.

When separate bulletins for the North East and Cumbria were introduced in 1959, the TV news service was refocused to cover the North West and Yorkshire areas and at this point, production moved to a small studio at Broadcasting House, situated above a bank at Piccadilly Gardens and shared with the BBC's radio and newsgathering facilities in Manchester.

By 1962, the nightly bulletins had been extended to 20 minutes and evolved into the magazine programme North at Six, later renamed as Look North.

On 25 March 1968, the Manchester edition of Look North was refocused to cover the North West area, following the launch of a third Look North programme from Leeds. The programme was renamed in 1980 as Look North West, with News North West introduced for shorter bulletins.

On 18 May 1981, Look North West moved from Piccadilly Gardens to New Broadcasting House on nearby Oxford Road. BBC North West Tonight was introduced on 3 September 1984 to coincide with the launch of the BBC Six O'Clock News.

Between 1986 and 1989, the programme also covered parts of Cumbria previously served by the Newcastle edition of Look North and provided a news opt-out for the area at lunchtime. Later, Cumbrian news coverage was switched back to the Newcastle edition of Look North.

The last edition of the programme from Studio B at New Broadcasting House on Oxford Road aired on 27 November 2011 and was also the last broadcast from the studios after 36 years of operation. The programme's first broadcast from the BBC's Salford Quays studios took place the following day, during the BBC Breakfast programme. BBC North West Tonight and BBC Breakfast shared the same studio until 2023.

== Broadcast times ==
=== BBC North West Today ===
On weekdays, breakfast bulletins air as part of BBC Breakfast at 25 and 55 minutes past the hour, between 6:25 am and 9:00 am. A 10-minute lunchtime bulletin airs at around 1:35 pm, within the BBC News at One (which, since extending its airtime to 60 minutes in 2024, also presents from MediaCityUK).

=== BBC North West Tonight ===
The main edition of BBC North West Tonight is broadcast every weeknight between 6.30 pm and 7.00 pm. A late-night 15-minute edition of the programme is broadcast Monday to Friday at 10.30 pm, following the BBC News at Ten.

BBC North West Tonight airs short early evening bulletins on Saturday and Sunday evenings, although times vary. A late-night bulletin is broadcast on Sundays, following the BBC News at Ten.

== Presenters ==
=== Notable current presenters ===
Main presenters

- Roger Johnson (Monday - Thursday)
- Annabel Tiffin (Friday)
- Hayley Hassall

Weather presenters

- Molly Brewer (main presenter) (Monday, Thursday and Friday)
- Keeley Donovan (main presenter)(Tuesday and Wednesday)

=== Former presenters ===
Notable former main anchors include Stuart Hall, John Mundy, Gordon Burns, and Ranvir Singh.

For 38 years, Dave Guest was chief reporter, as well as a presenter, producer and editor of BBC North West Tonight. He retired on 23 October 2020.

Dianne Oxberry was the programme's first dedicated weather presenter, working on the programme until shortly before her sudden death from ovarian cancer in January 2019.

- Beccy Barr
- Rachael Bland
- Gordon Burns
- Mark Edwardson
- Owain Wyn Evans
- Stuart Flinders
- Felicity Goodey
- Dave Guest
- Stuart Hall
- Philip Hayton
- Eddie Hemmings
- Martin Henfield
- Tony Livesey
- Tony Morris
- John Mundy
- Merryn Myatt
- Dianne Oxberry
- Winifred Robinson
- Phil Sayer
- Ranvir Singh
- Nina Warhurst
- Nigel Jay
