= Martin Henfield =

British TV & radio presenter

Martin Henfield is a British TV and radio presenter and media specialist. Henfield has worked as a reporter, producer, editor and senior manager in BBC Radio and TV for 26 years. He ran BBC GMR radio station for 5 years and presented BBC North West Tonight in the 1990s.

He also presented the "Vague News" section of Mark and Lards afternoon show on BBC Radio 1 in the late 1990s.

He now works in public presentation and media training. Henfield has an identical twin brother, Michael, who has also worked in radio and media training for many years and used to be a journalism lecturer at the University of Salford. He is married to a University of Central Lancashire journalism lecturer, Maggie Henfield, a former features editor for the Manchester Evening News.

Henfield presented his first ever television commercial, promoting participation in the vote for the Manchester congestion charge in November 2008. which was investigated by Ofcom after complaints questioning the impartiality of the advert which leaned towards the pro side of the debate. It was found to be biased, and ordered to be withdrawn.
