= Sally Taylor (TV presenter) =

English journalist and presenter (born 1957)

Sally Taylor MBE
- Born: 24 February 1957 (age 69); Reading, Berkshire, England
- Occupations: Journalist, TV presenter
- Notable credit: BBC South Today

Sally Taylor MBE (born 24 February 1957) is an English journalist and presenter. She is best known for presenting BBC South Today.

== Biography ==
She attended The Abbey School, Reading, an independent school.

Before beginning her career as a presenter and journalist, she was an English teacher at Winstanley Community College, Leicester.

She presented South Today, the flagship news programme of BBC South, from 1987 until 2025. Taylor also writes a weekly column in the Southern Daily Echo. She had a Saturday morning show on Radio Solent for many years until February 2011. In 2003, Taylor successfully filled in when weather presenter Dorcas Henry collapsed live on air.

Taylor hosted The Spending Review, The South Today Debate on BBC One with Naga Munchetty on 9 September 2010.

She was appointed a Member of the Order of the British Empire (MBE) in the 2005 Birthday Honours for services to regional broadcasting. For the 2015 United Kingdom general election she moderated a special local debate for South Today. In October 2015, she was awarded an Honorary Doctor of Letters degree in recognition of her work in broadcasting and with local charities by the University of Winchester. She is described as a "top notch journalist and someone you can trust to tell you the news without fear or favour"

Taylor appeared in The Vagina Monologues during its UK run at Southampton's Mayflower Theatre in 2010.

She retired from South Today on 20 March 2025 after 38 years.

In November 2025, she was awarded with an Honorary Doctorate of Letters from Bournemouth University.
