= Standing passenger =

Passengers who remain standing during public transport

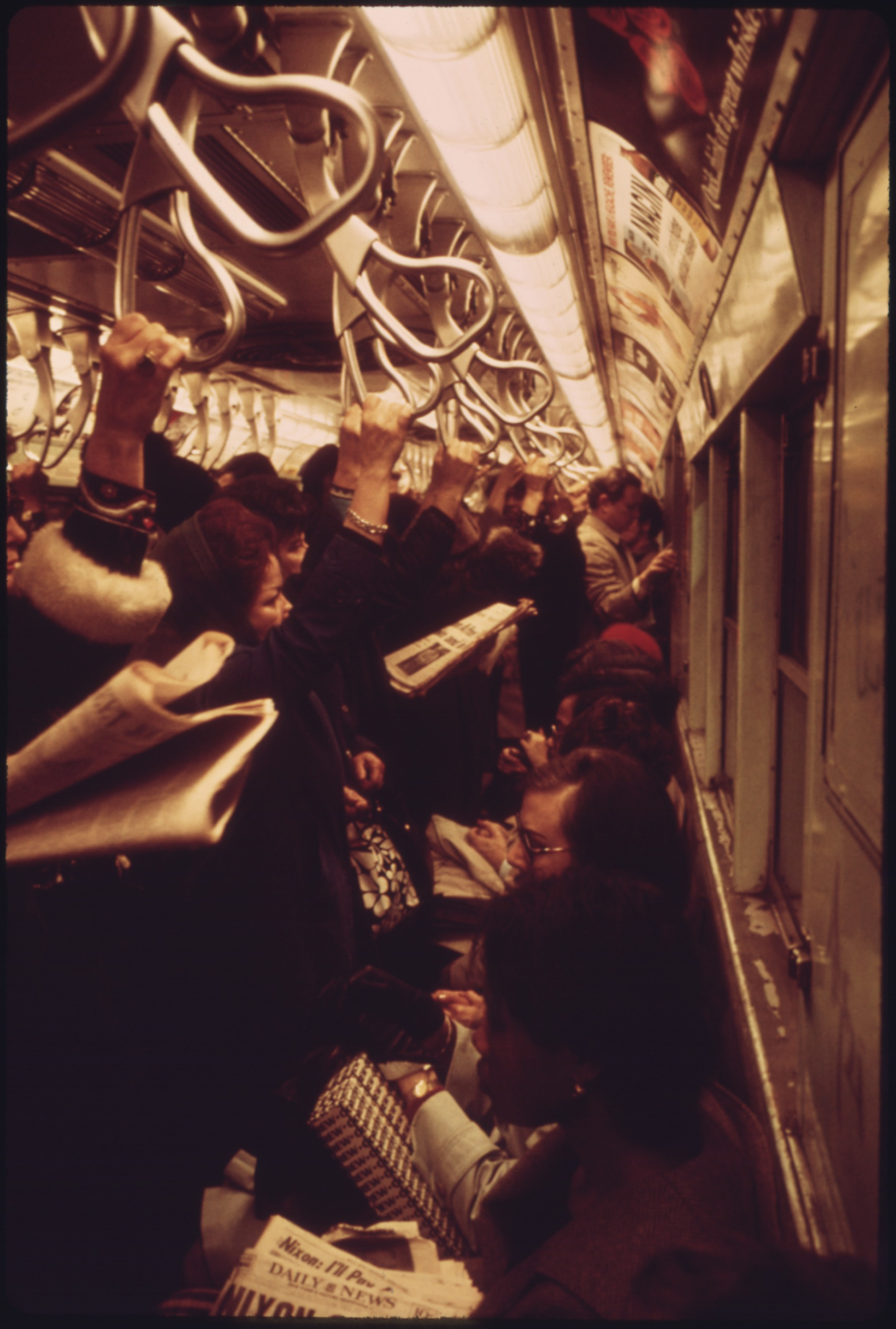
Passengers using pivoted grab handles on a congested New York City Subway train in April 1974

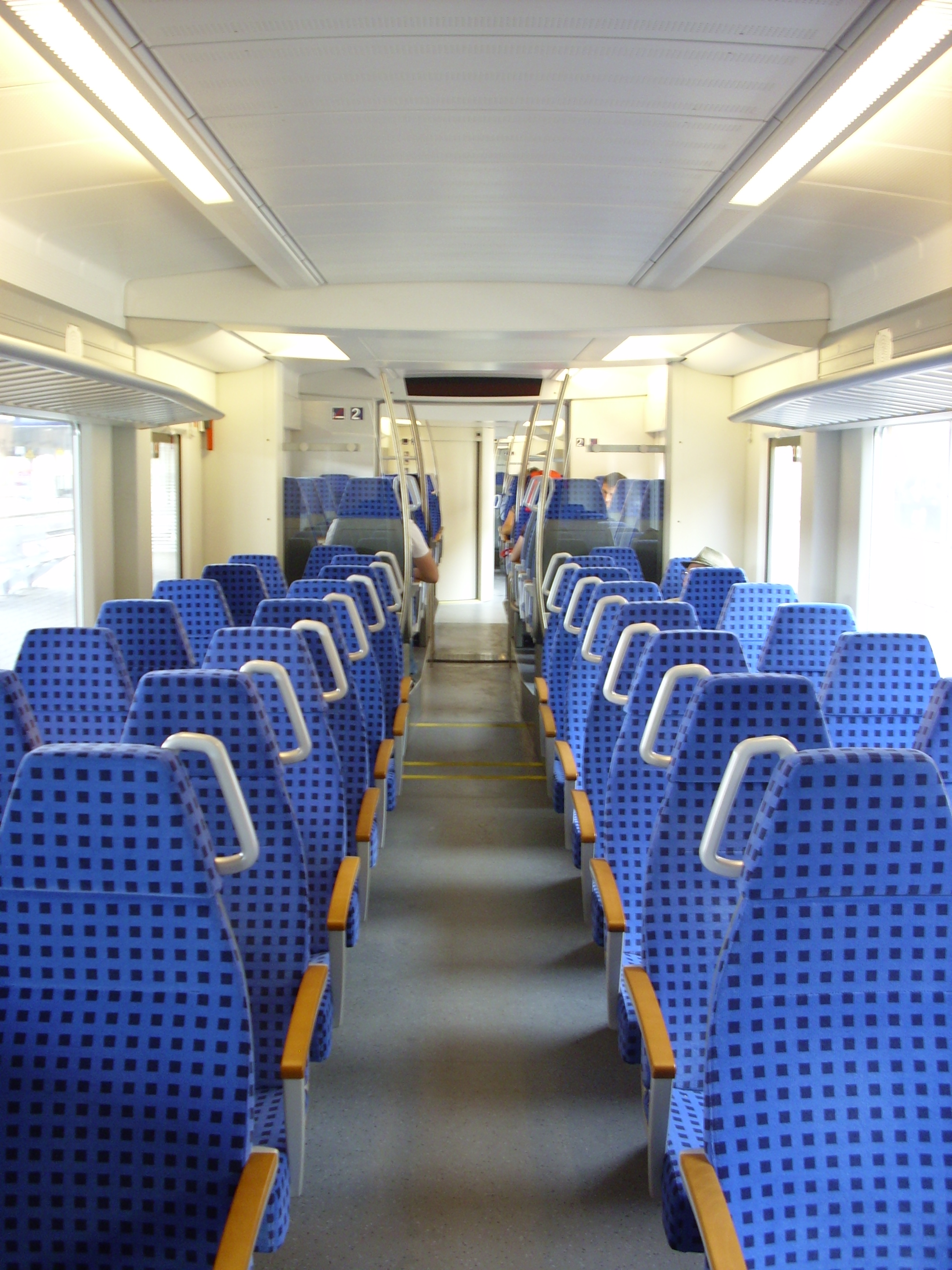
Grab rails on a longer-distance commuter train which is designed mostly for seated passengers

In urban public transport, provision is made for standing passengers, often called straphangers or standees, to rationalize operation and to provide extra capacity during rush hour.

On crowded rapid transit urban lines, while most travelers may be seated during off-peak services, only a limited proportion will be seated during the peak services. The longer the journey, the less willing passengers are to stand. On intercity rail or coach services, the willingness among passengers to stand is often low, or it may even be prohibited, with reserved seating to ensure that all passengers can be seated. Furthermore, there are also modes of public transport where standing is always prohibited in the vehicle, including school buses, gondola lifts, and amusement park railways.

In aviation, safety measures require all passengers and crew to be seated with their seat belts fastened during taxiing, take-off, landing, and turbulence, so airlines do not allow passengers to travel without a seat. However, in 2010, Ryanair, a low-cost airline proposed a "vertical seat" design for use by standing passengers on its aircraft.

== Seated-to-standing ratio ==
The seated-to-standing ratio is the ratio between the number of passengers that can be seated and the number of standing passengers on a public transport vehicle. A higher standing ratio allows for more passengers in a given area, but detracts the perceived quality of the transport, in particular over long distances. This metric is normally limited to urban mass transit, due to intercity transport normally only offering seated travel. On longer haul services, bilevel cars are often used to allow for increased seating, though this increases the dwell time at stations, making increased seating ratio versus service time tradeoffs.

== Passengers per square metre ==
Passengers per square metre is a quality of service metric used to determine the standard of comfort provided to standing passengers in a transportation vehicle. Multiplying this number by the total available standing area on a vehicle gives the total standing passenger capacity. Bus services in Europe operate at about four passengers per square metre.

== Safety and health ==
Standing passengers are susceptible to suffering falls and other injuries, particularly elderly people. Shorter people and children may not be able to reach ceiling-mounted handles, straps, or rails. Porous cloth straps are hard to clean, and are being replaced by rubber or plastic straps, and metal fixtures often made of stainless steel.

== Handholds ==
Various types of handholds are provided for standing passengers:

- hanging strap – a strap suspended from the ceiling (often with a handle or a loop)
- grab handle – a pivoted, rigidly-mounted, or suspended handle often mounted above eye level of standing passengers
- handrails – rigid rails running horizontally below the ceiling
- stanchions – vertical poles anchored between the floor and ceiling
- grab rails or grab bars – smaller hand rails attached to seats, doors, and doorways
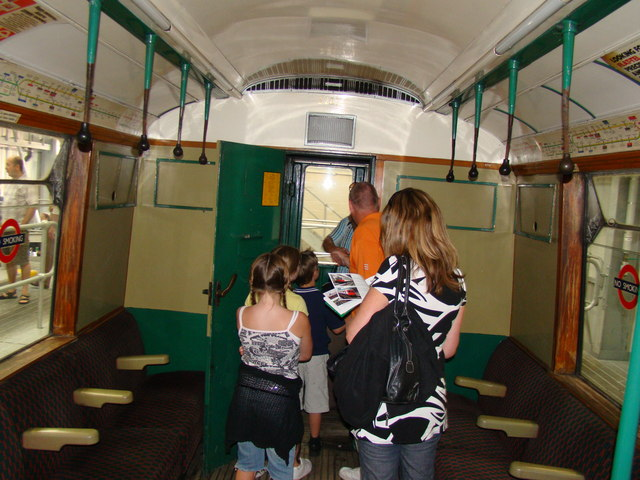
An old-fashioned London Underground train with hanging straps without looped handles

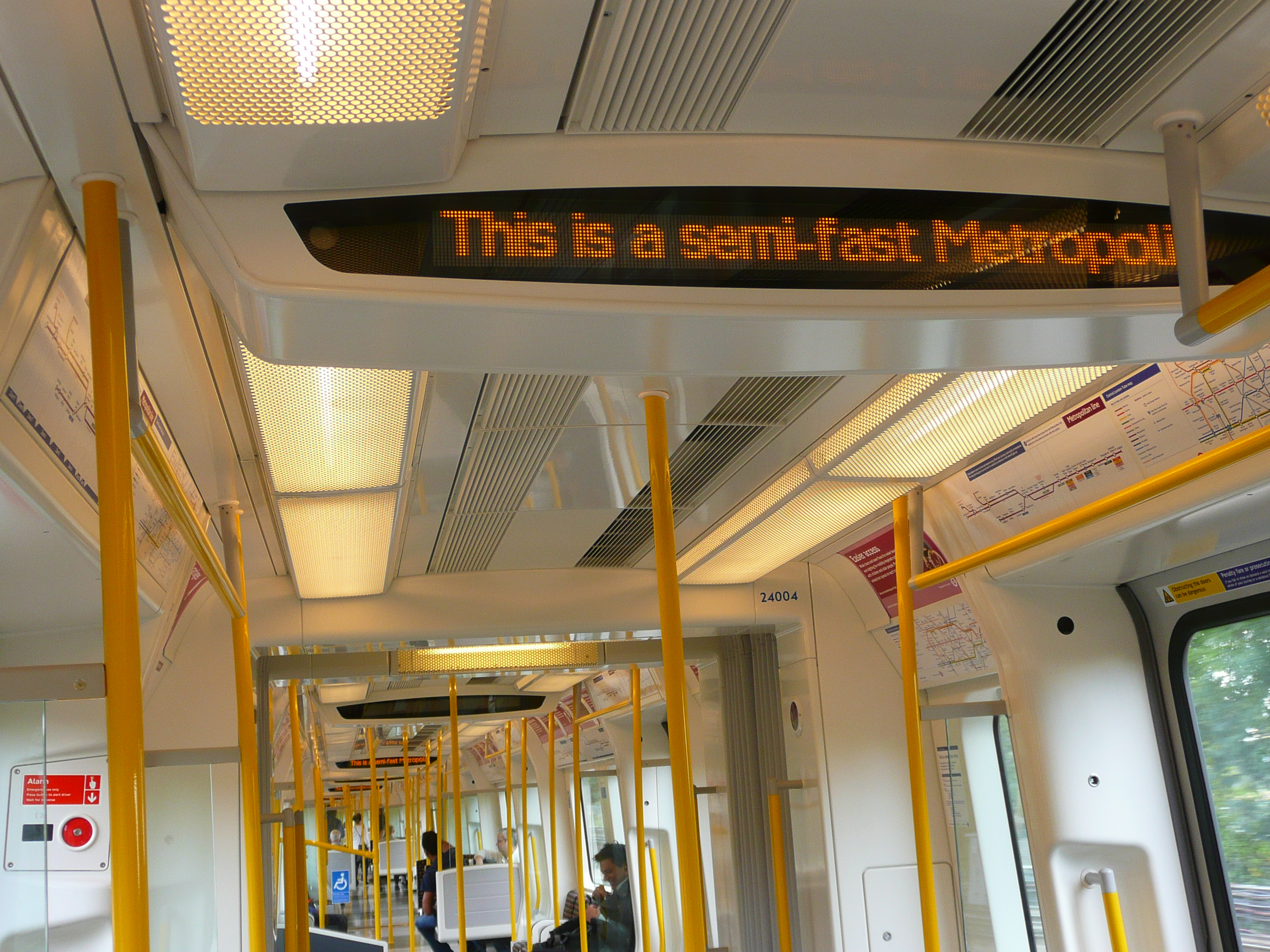
Handrails on a modern London Underground S Stock train

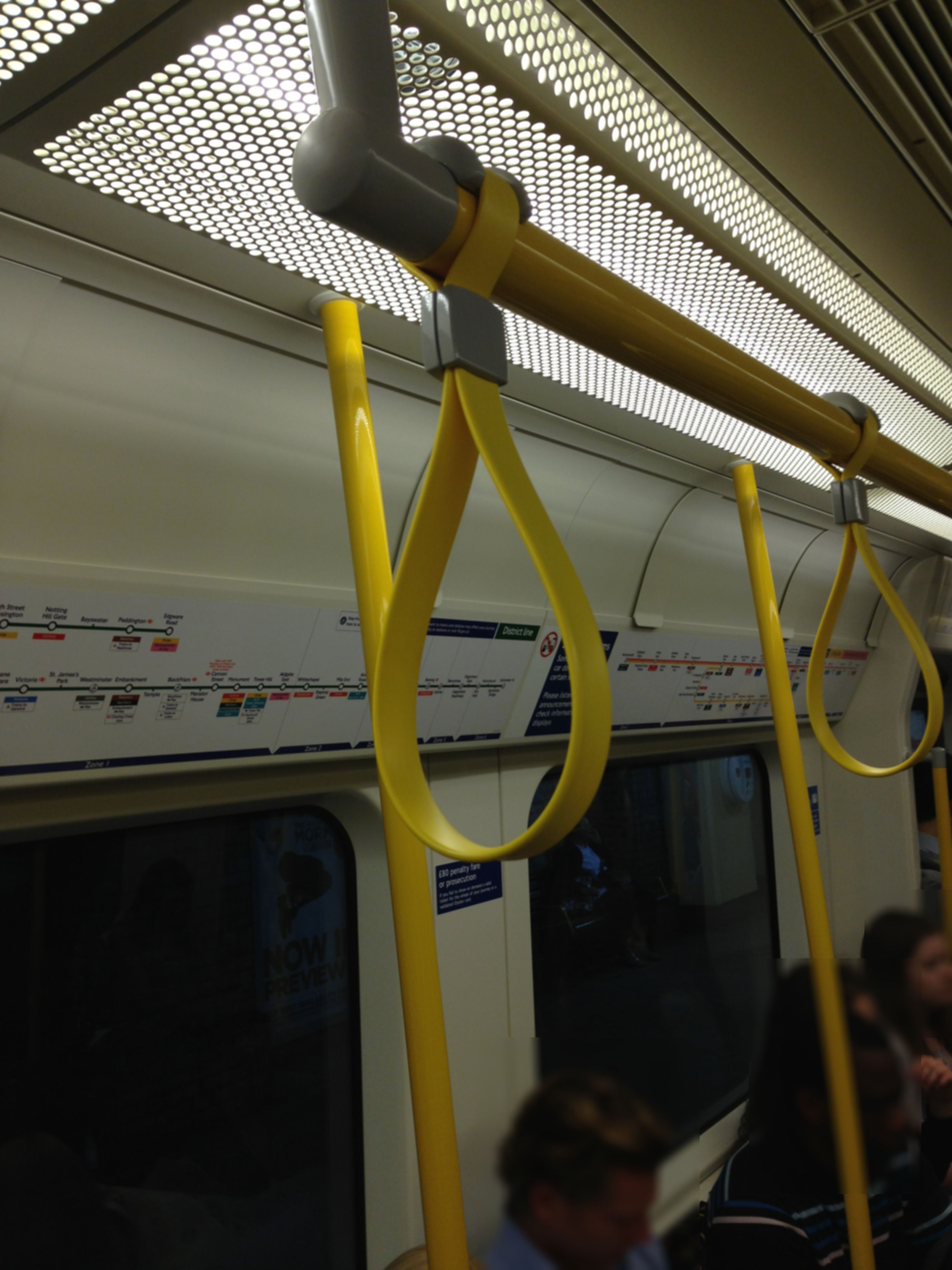
Straps inside a London Underground train

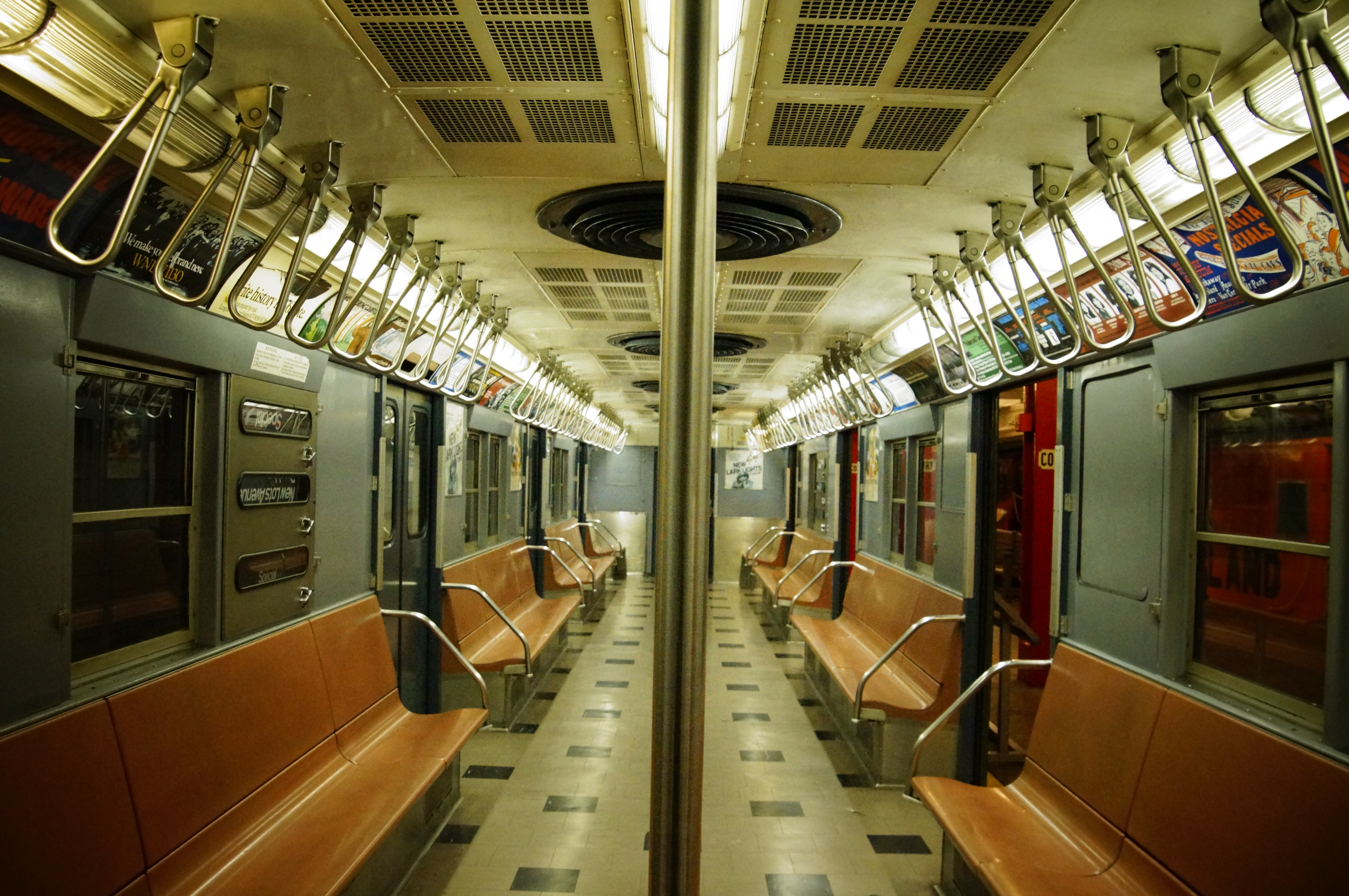
Older NYCTA R30 train carriage has two rows of pivoted grab handles

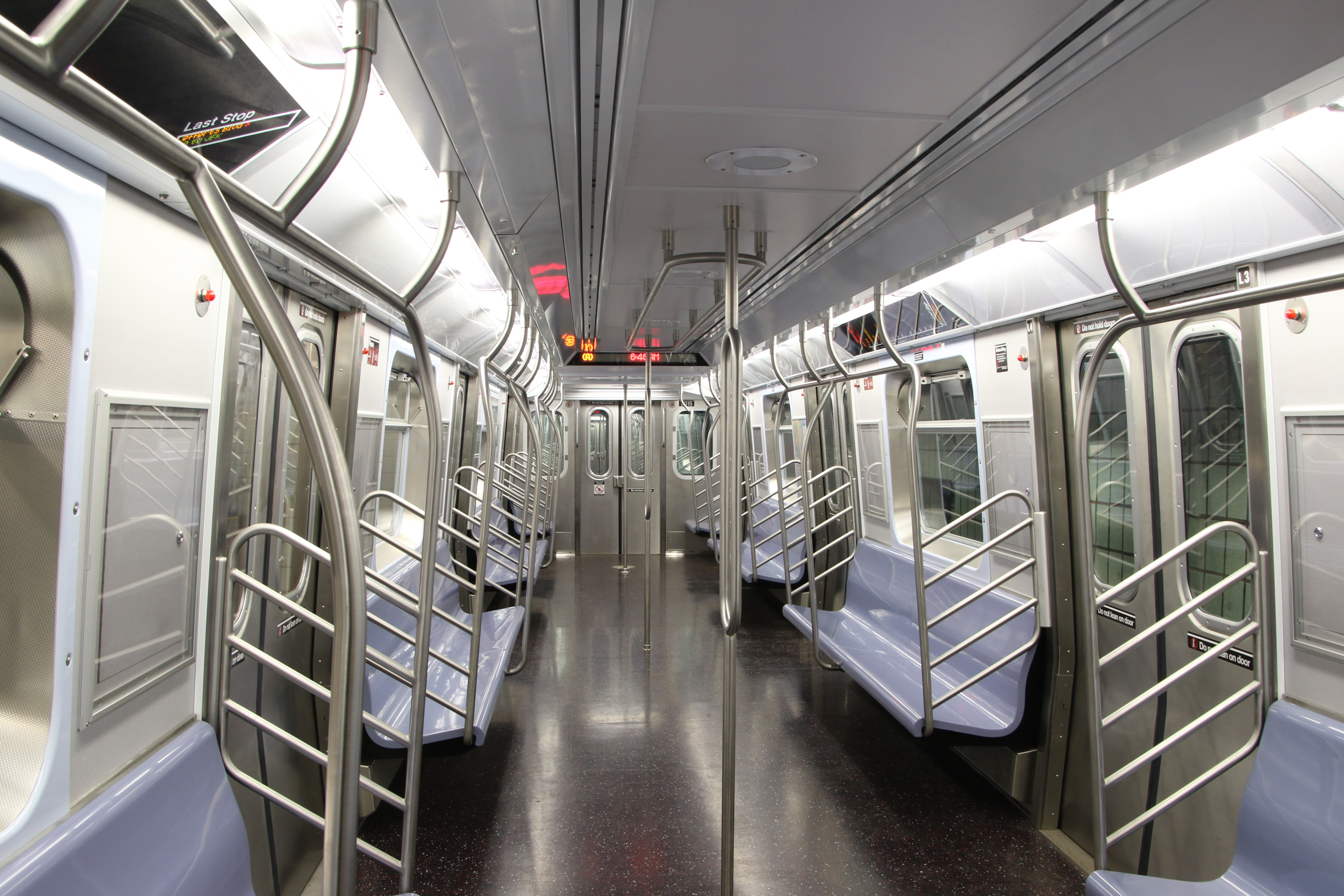
R179 car has numerous handholds and looped stanchions for high capacity services in New York City

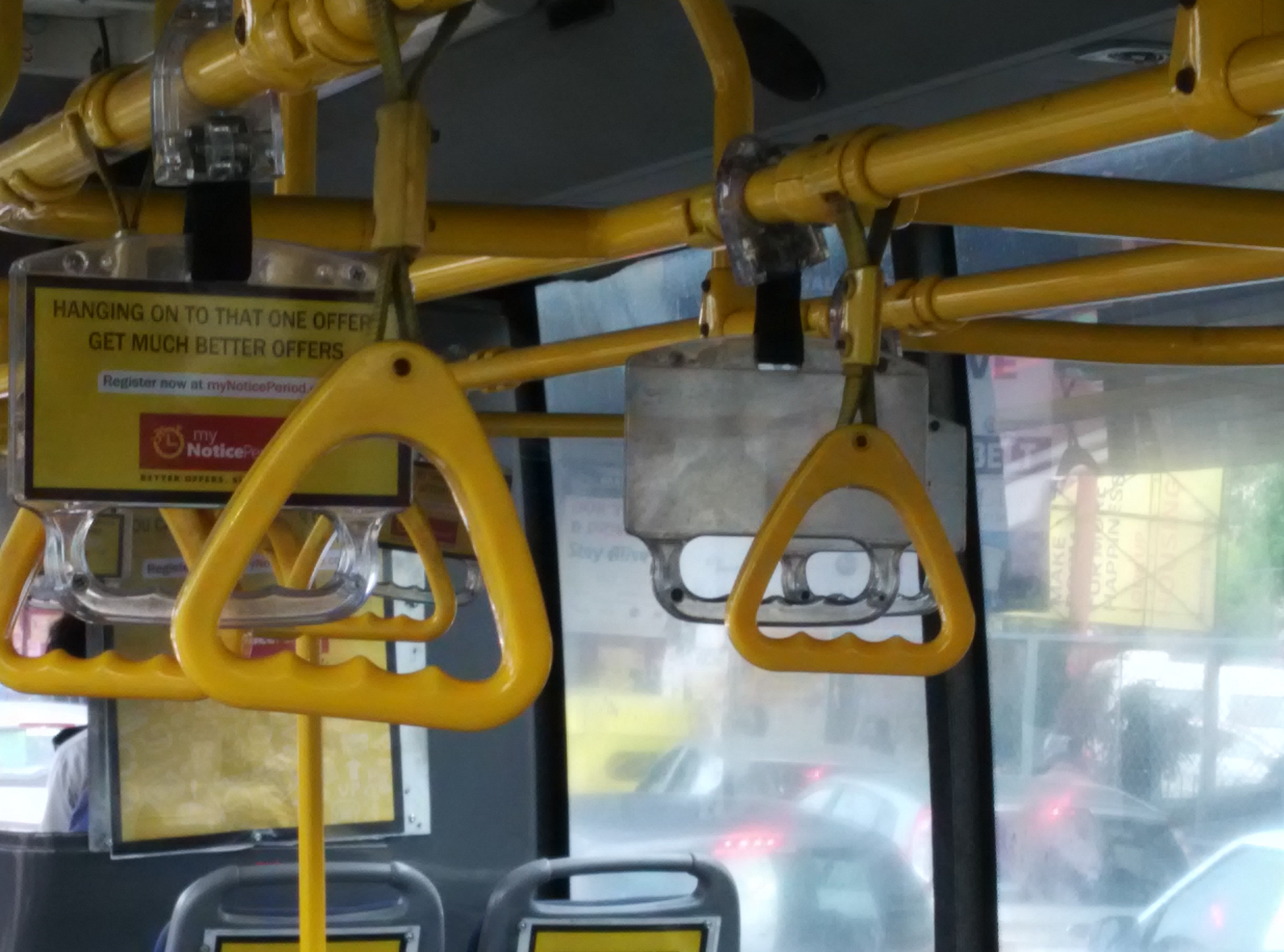
Bus grab handles in Bengaluru, India

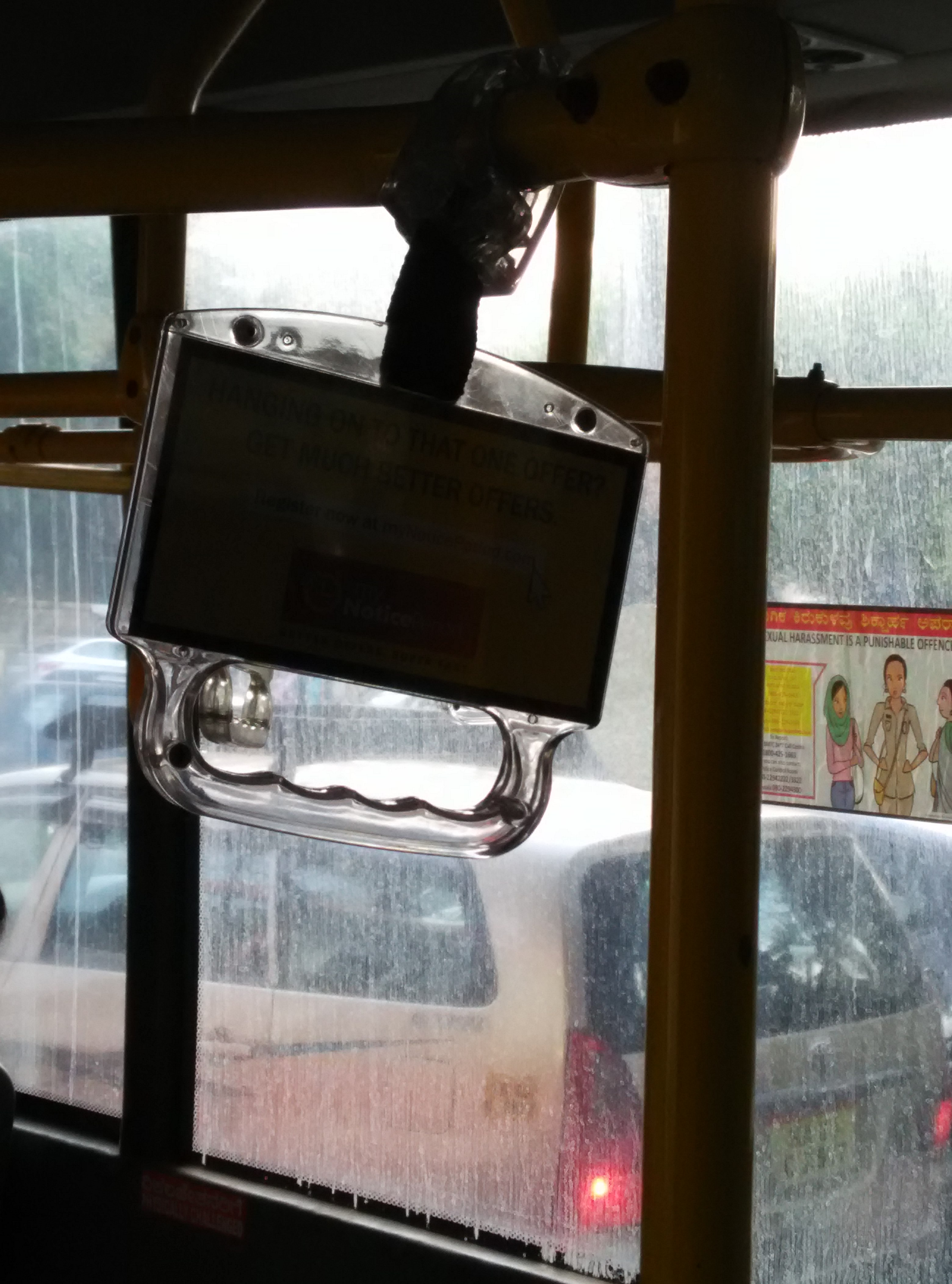
Grab handles on a commuter bus.

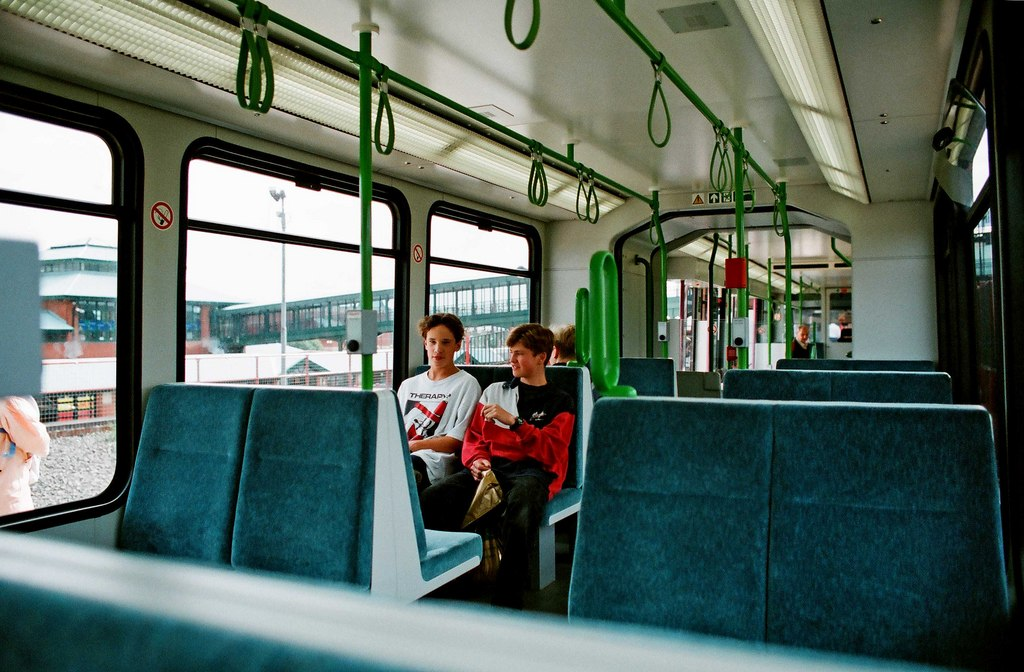
The Supertram in Sheffield, England with moveable straps

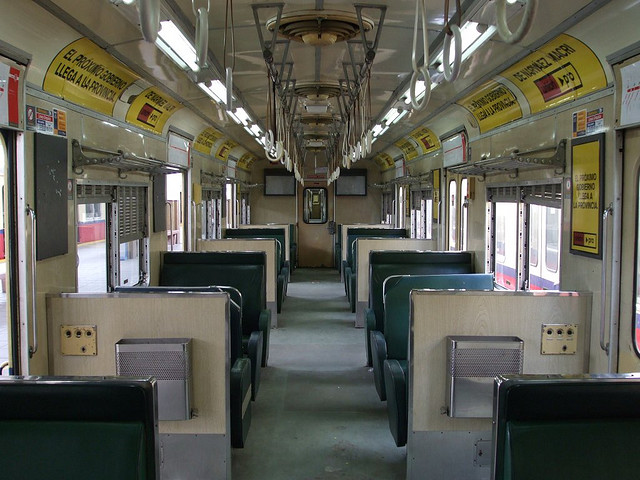
Railcar in Buenos Aires with suspended rings

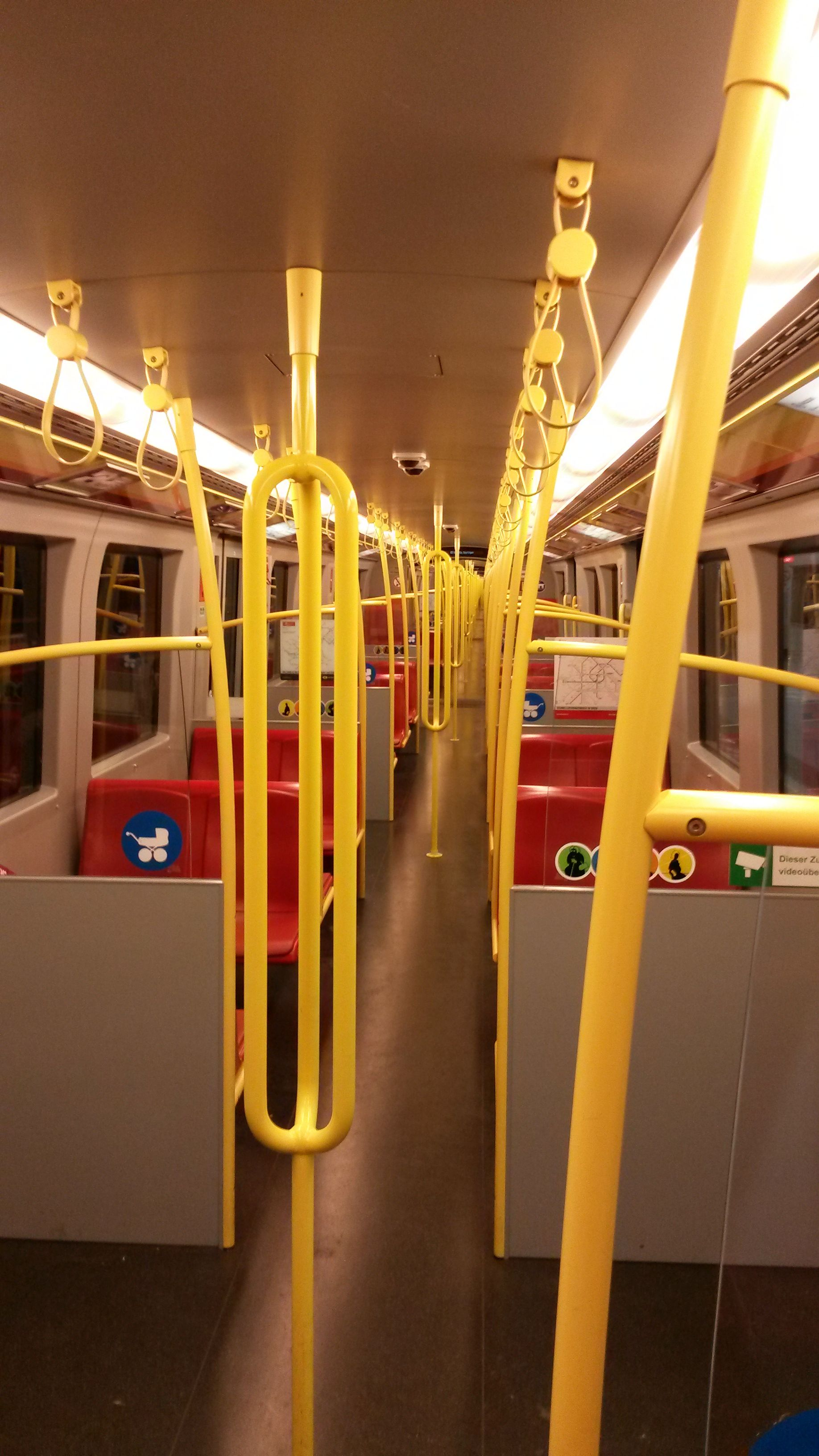
Handholds onboard a Vienna U3 train

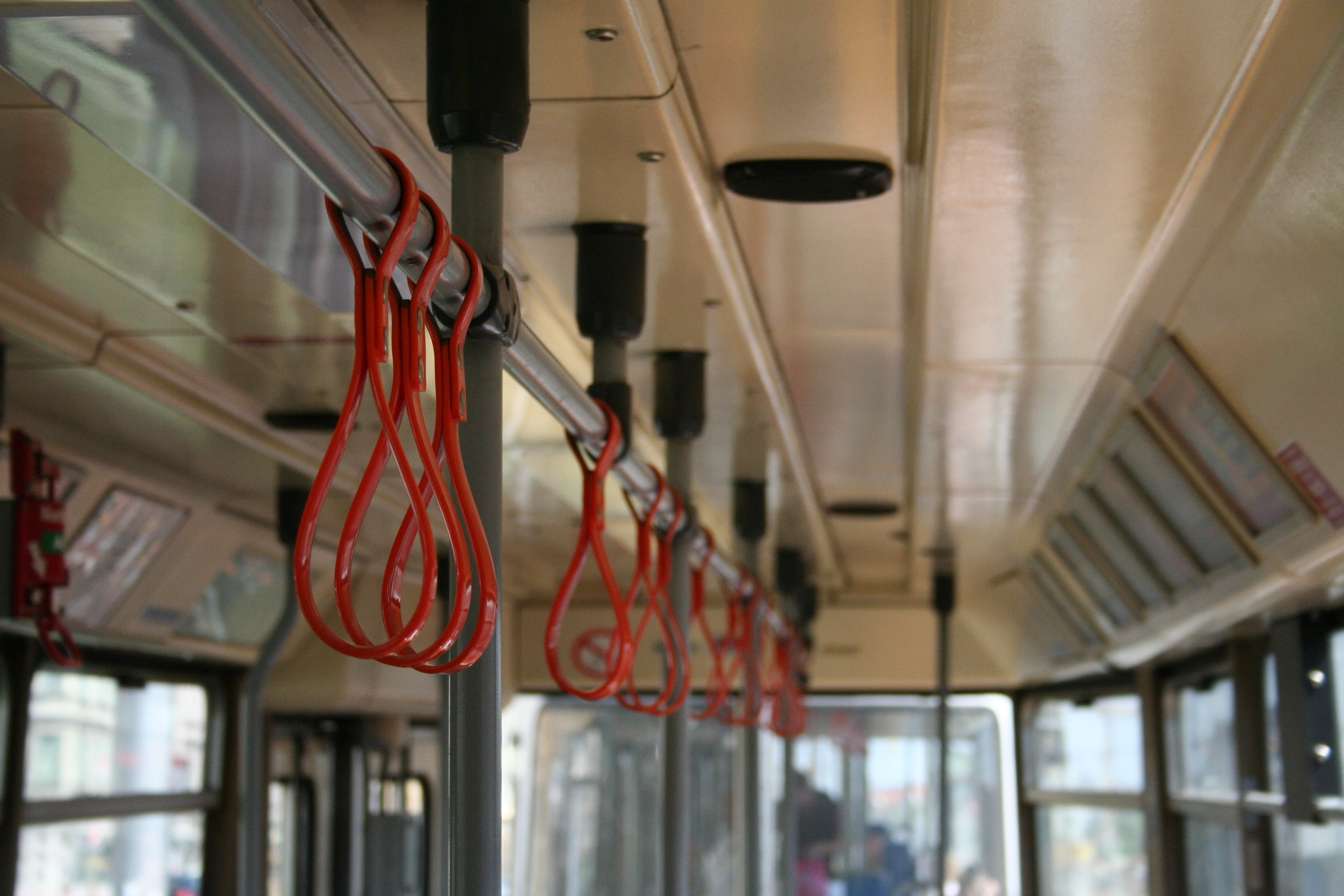
Moveable straps on a Vienna tram

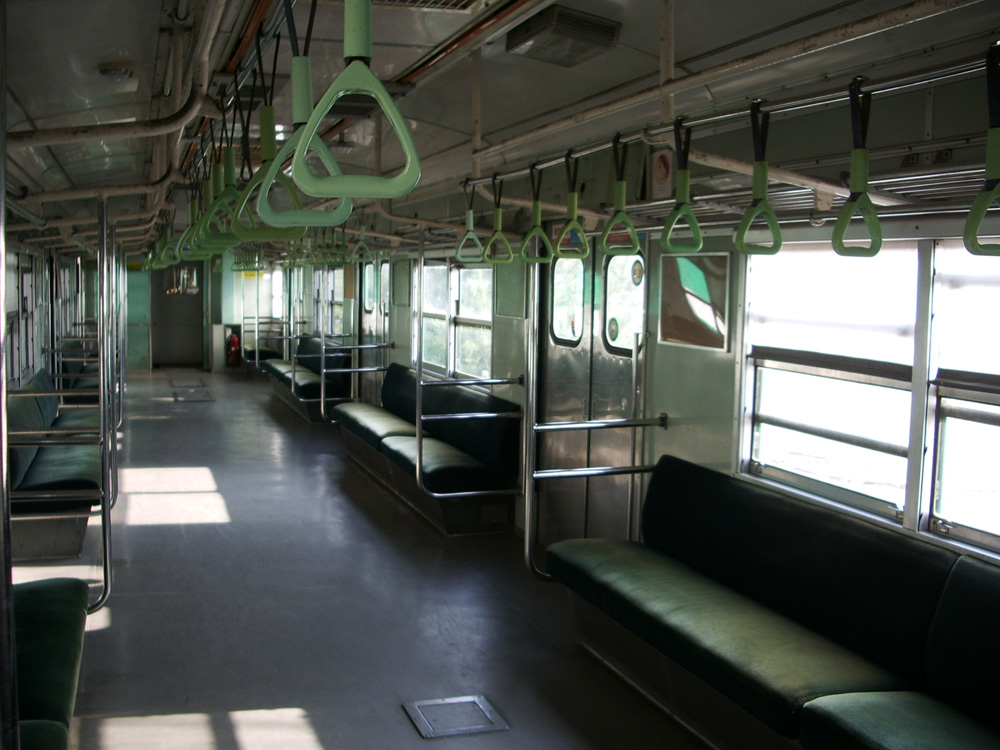
Strap-hung handles onboard a Seoul Metropolitan Subway railcar

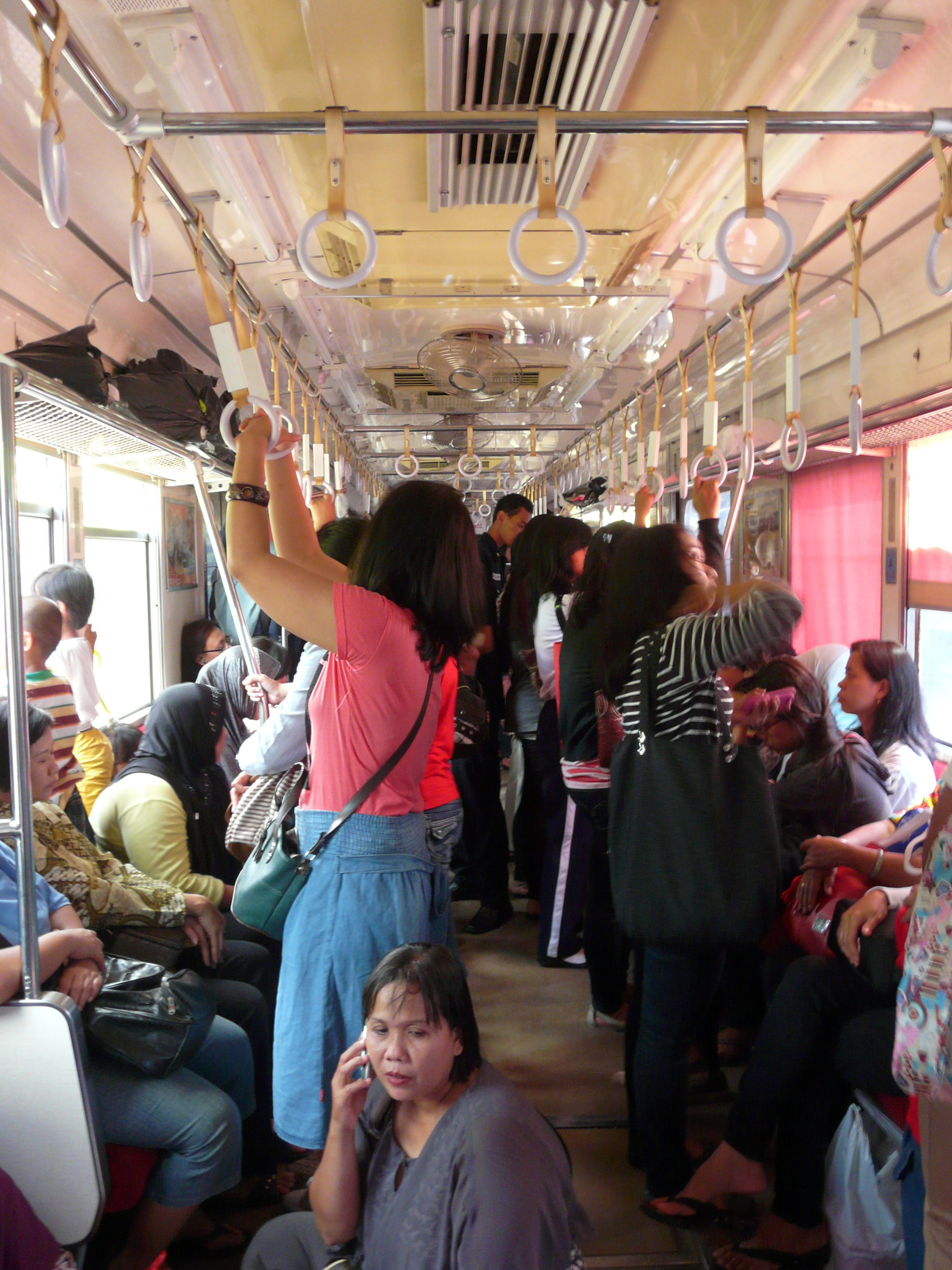
Suspended rings in Indonesia

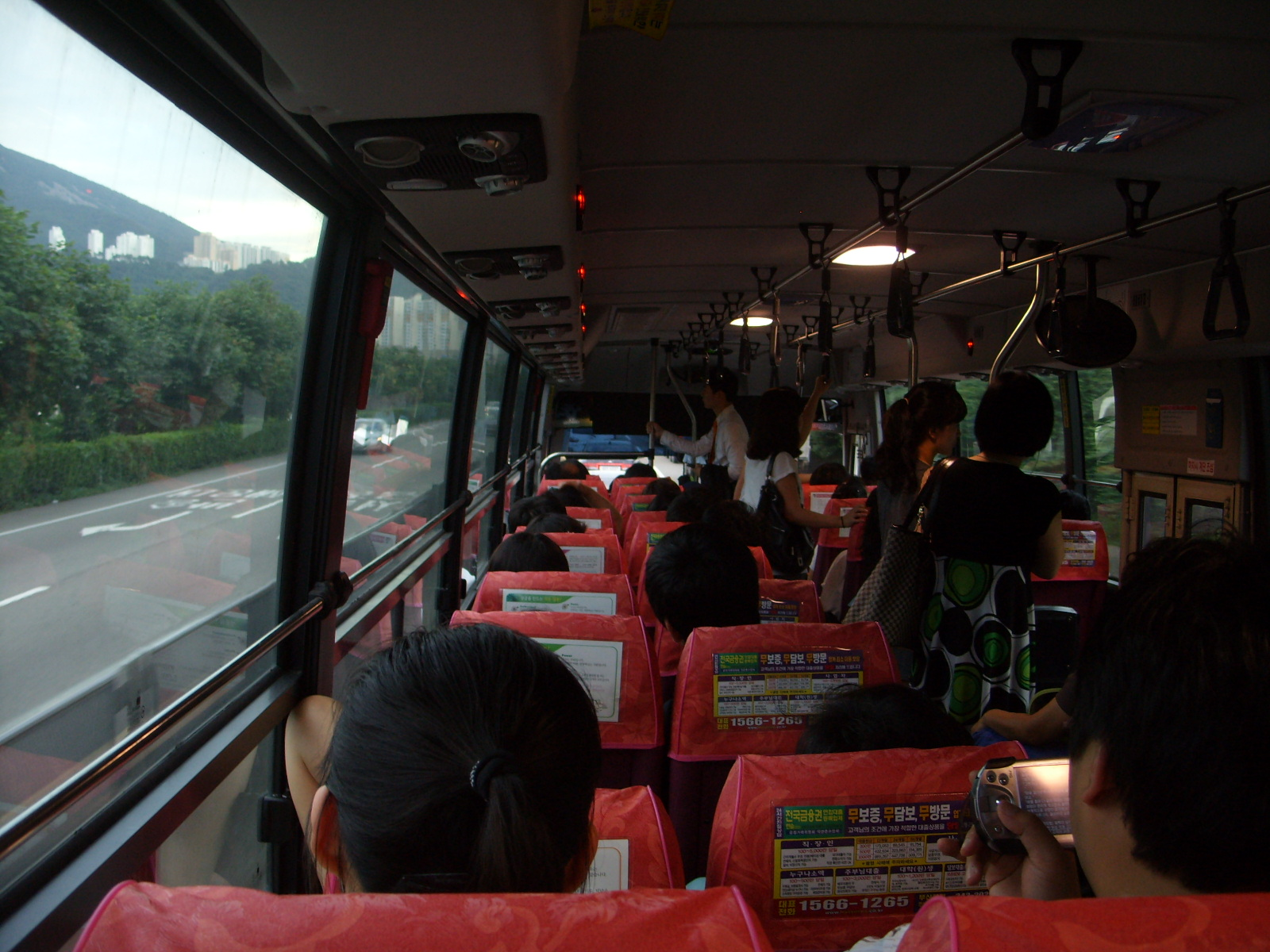
High-floor coach in South Korea, unusually fitted with grab handles and poles
