= Ordsall, Greater Manchester =

Suburb of the City of Salford, England

Coordinates: 53.474°N 2.278°W

Ordsall
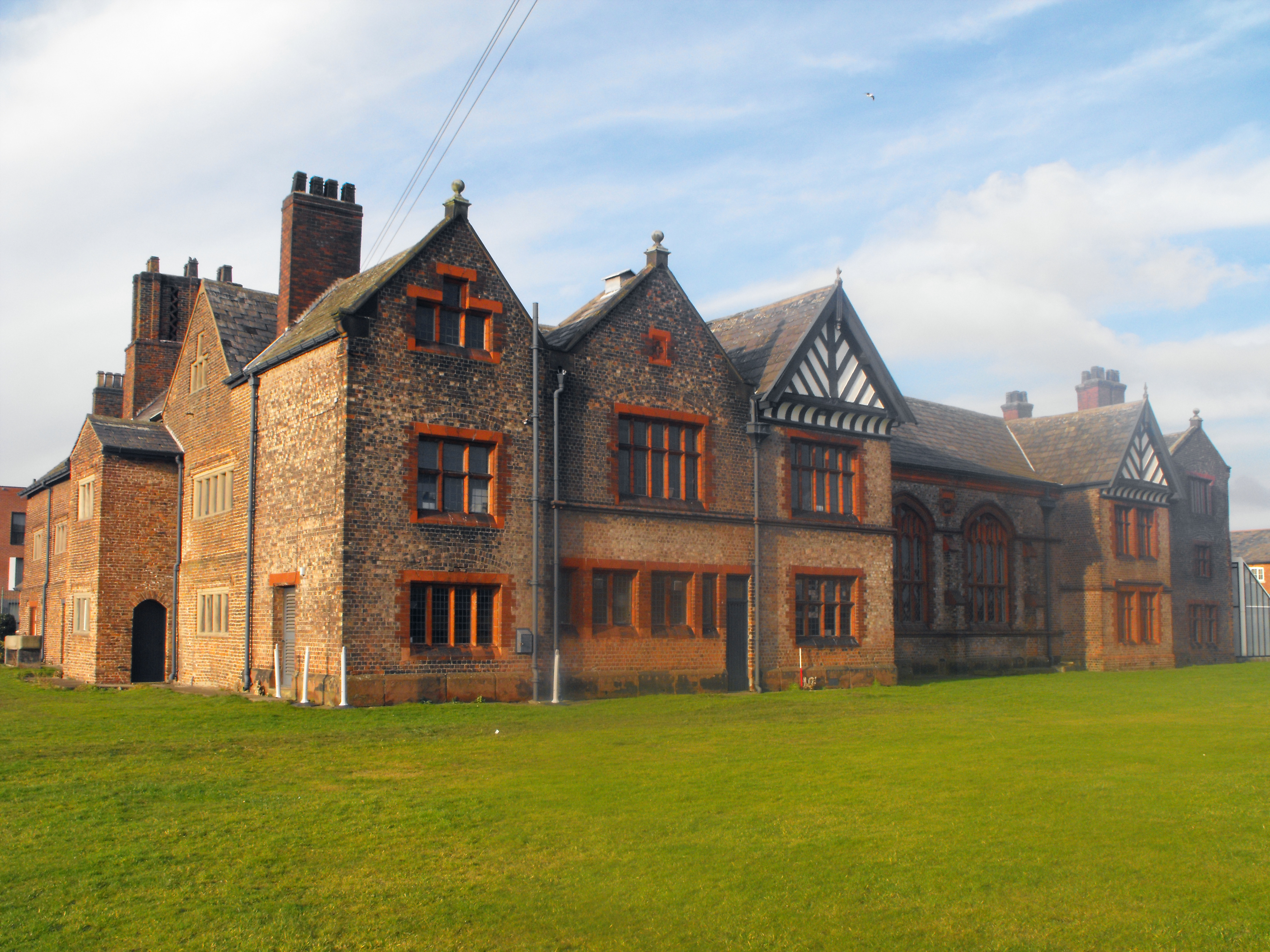
- Ordsall Hall

- Location within Greater Manchester
- Population: 14,194 (2011.ward)
- OS grid reference: SJ815975
- Metropolitan borough: Salford
- Metropolitan county: Greater Manchester
- Region: North West
- Country: England
- Sovereign state: United Kingdom
- Post town: SALFORD
- Postcode district: M5
- Dialling code: 0161
- Police: Greater Manchester
- Fire: Greater Manchester
- Ambulance: North West
- UK Parliament: Salford

Ordsall is an inner city suburb of Salford, Greater Manchester, England. The population at the 2011 census was 14,194. It lies chiefly to the south of the A57 road, close to the River Irwell, the main boundary with the city of Manchester, Salford Quays and Manchester Ship Canal, which divides it from Stretford.

Historically part of Lancashire, Ordsall was the birthplace of the bush roller chain and is home to Ordsall Hall.

== History ==
The name Ordsall has Old English origins, being the personal name Ord and the word halh, meaning a corner or nook, which has become the modern dialect word "haugh". This, indeed, describes the position of the manor of Ordsall, for its boundary on the south side is a large bend in the River Irwell, which became the site of the docks for the Manchester Ship Canal. Ordsall first appears in records in 1177 when Ordeshala paid two marks towards an aid, a feudal due or tax.

Antiquarian and Geologist, Samuel Hibbert-Ware gave a different etymology for the name; ord is a Saxon word for "primeval" or "very old" and hal meaning "den" - hence the name Ordeshal could mean "very old den". His reasoning for this was the location in the area of the cave known as Woden's Den.

=== Woden's Den ===
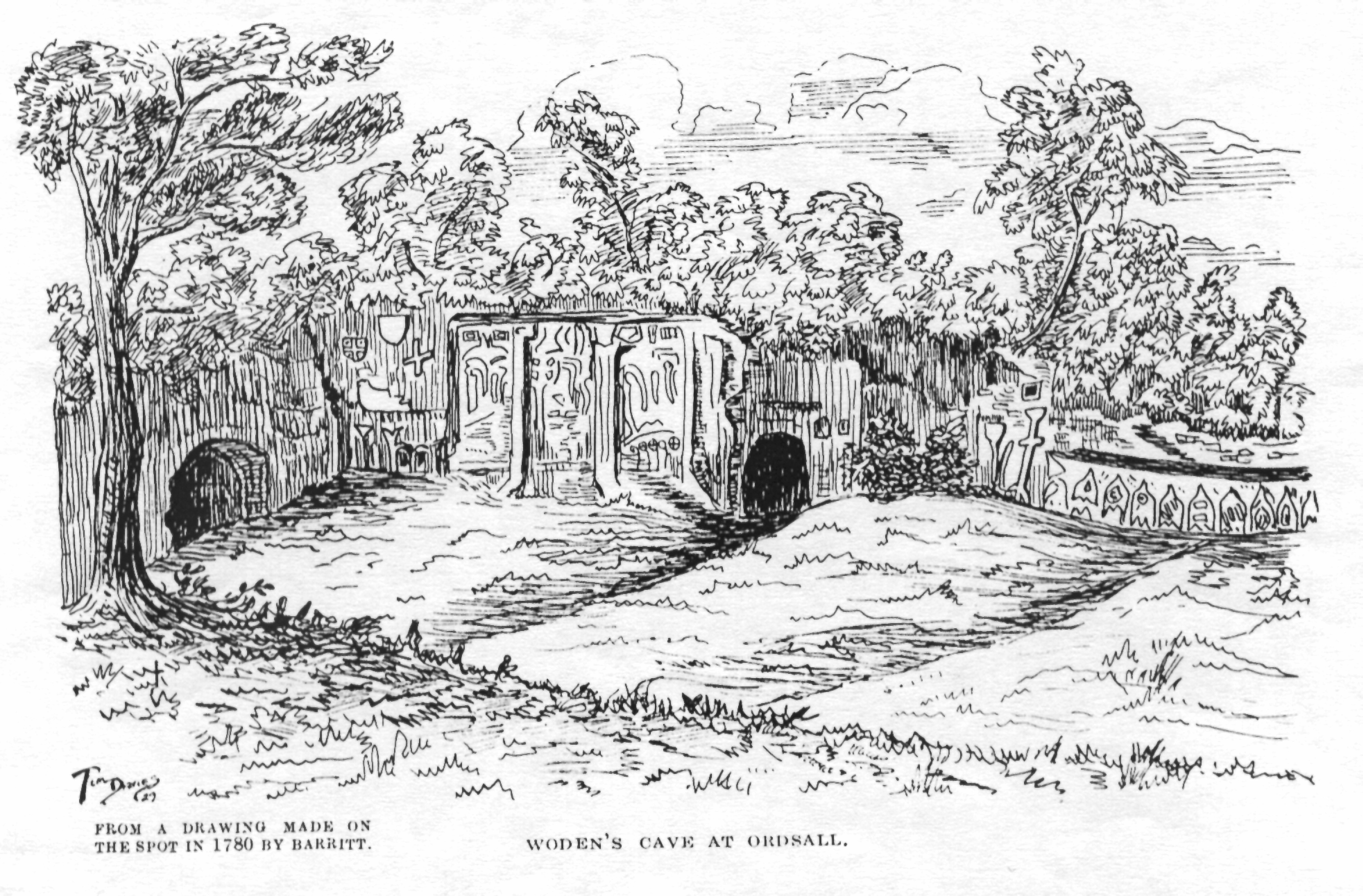
Woden's Den in 1780 as sketched by Thomas Barret

Before the River Irwell was deepened to make it navigable there was an ancient, paved ford at Ordsall known as Woden's Ford and nearby, in a lane leading to Ordsall Hall, was a cave known as Woden's Den. The cave was of great interest to 19th-century antiquarians, but their constant trespassing to view the site prompted the landowner to completely destroy it early in the century, and no trace of the feature remains. However, the cave was described and sketched by Thomas Barret in about 1780. (Note: Worden's or Woden's Ford is a paved causeway across the River Irwell from Hulme-field, where Medlock loses itself in the aforesaid river, to the opposite bank, but now lost to every observer since Irwell was made navigable. Woden's Den is the spot I wish to throw light upon, although obscured by darkness, perhaps of many ages. Tradition supposes it to have been the den or woody habitation of the priest or priests of Woden, the much-esteemed war deity of the idol Saxons...What might be the extent, or bounds, of this supposed idol temple, or place of sacrifices, we know not; but certainly it was once of a much larger extent. What remains of its height is now about 6 feet, and the length of the whole, as it now appears is about 22 yards. At the South, and near the great tree, as may be seen by referring to the drawing, is a hole about 3 feet wide, much resembling an oven, and near the middle is another excavation, not so deep in the rock as the former, at the northern extremity. The margin of the rock, just above the surface of the Earth, is ornamented with a sort of regular Gothic tracery, and gently curves into a cavity of about double the size of the aforesaid recesses. The range of the rock is all along shaded with overhanging bushes, which much obscure the same from the notice of passengers. Admitting the above to be in a devoted place for pagan superstitions in the Saxon times, it again presents itself under the character of a place dedicated to the retirement and devotion of a professor of Christianity. On one part of the rock much labour has been distilled into ornamenting it with root characters, which have been called runic, but which plainly appear upon closer examination, to have the letters J.H.S. the Latin initials of Jesus the saviour of men in rude church text. The above letters show themselves in three or four places, and, in one part, the letters appear about 3 feet longer a-piece. Some few shields ornamented with crosses may be seen in different places wrought upon the rock. Near the south end are the faint remains of a shield with the like of a sword handle near it. At what period of time a change of worship happened here I cannot say, but many places devoted to heathen worship were afterwards dedicated to Christianity. Hibbert was convinced that the cave was a temple to Odin, saying in his book History of the foundations in Manchester of Christ's College, Chetham's Hospital and the Free Grammar School (1830), "There can be little question but that in this recess the sacrifices, divination and compacts appertaining to worship of the hero of the Edda were regularly practised".) He postulated that, as this part of the Irwell was subject to regular flooding, travellers would have made offerings to Odin, the protector of travellers, before attempting the crossing. He also said that there were strong grounds to suppose that Cluniac monks of Lenton Priory, who had a cell called "St Leonards" at nearby Kersal, converted the cave into a Christian hermitage and served as guides to the crossing at Woden's Ford and the surrounding marshes in order to supplant the earlier pagan practices.

== Regeneration project ==
By the 1990s, Ordsall was one of the most deprived parts of Greater Manchester, with some of the highest crime rates. In April 1994, The Independent newspaper reported that the area had unemployment above 20% (around twice the national average) and that arson and car crime were a regular occurrence. In July 1992, a riot in the area saw local gangs fire gunshots at police and fire crews. A £100 million renovation project of the council estate at the site of the riot was completed in 2017, leading to the redevelopment of 672 homes alongside a shopping centre, hotel and GP surgery.

== Transport ==
Tram leaving Exchange Quay stop in Ordsall.

Ordsall Chord railway line became operational on 10 December 2017. This short railway line links Manchester Piccadilly and Manchester Oxford Road to Manchester Victoria, increasing capacity and reducing journey times into and through Manchester. It allows trains to run from Newcastle, Middlesbrough and Leeds direct to Manchester Airport without having to reverse at Manchester Piccadilly.

Ordsall is serviced by the Eccles Line of the Bee Network's Metrolink tram system stopping at Exchange Quay. In January 2026, the 30 bus service from Salford Quays to Piccadilly Gardens was launched, which transits through the redeveloped Ordsall Lane.

== Economy ==
Despite its notorious past, Ordsall's location between Manchester city centre and Salford Quays has led to a regeneration boom. A study commissioned by insurers More Than, published in June 2007, revealed that Ordsall had become one of the United Kingdom's property hot spots, ranking 17th out of the 35 identified. The study rated areas by looking at homes occupied by young, affluent professionals.

== Landmarks ==
Ordsall Hall

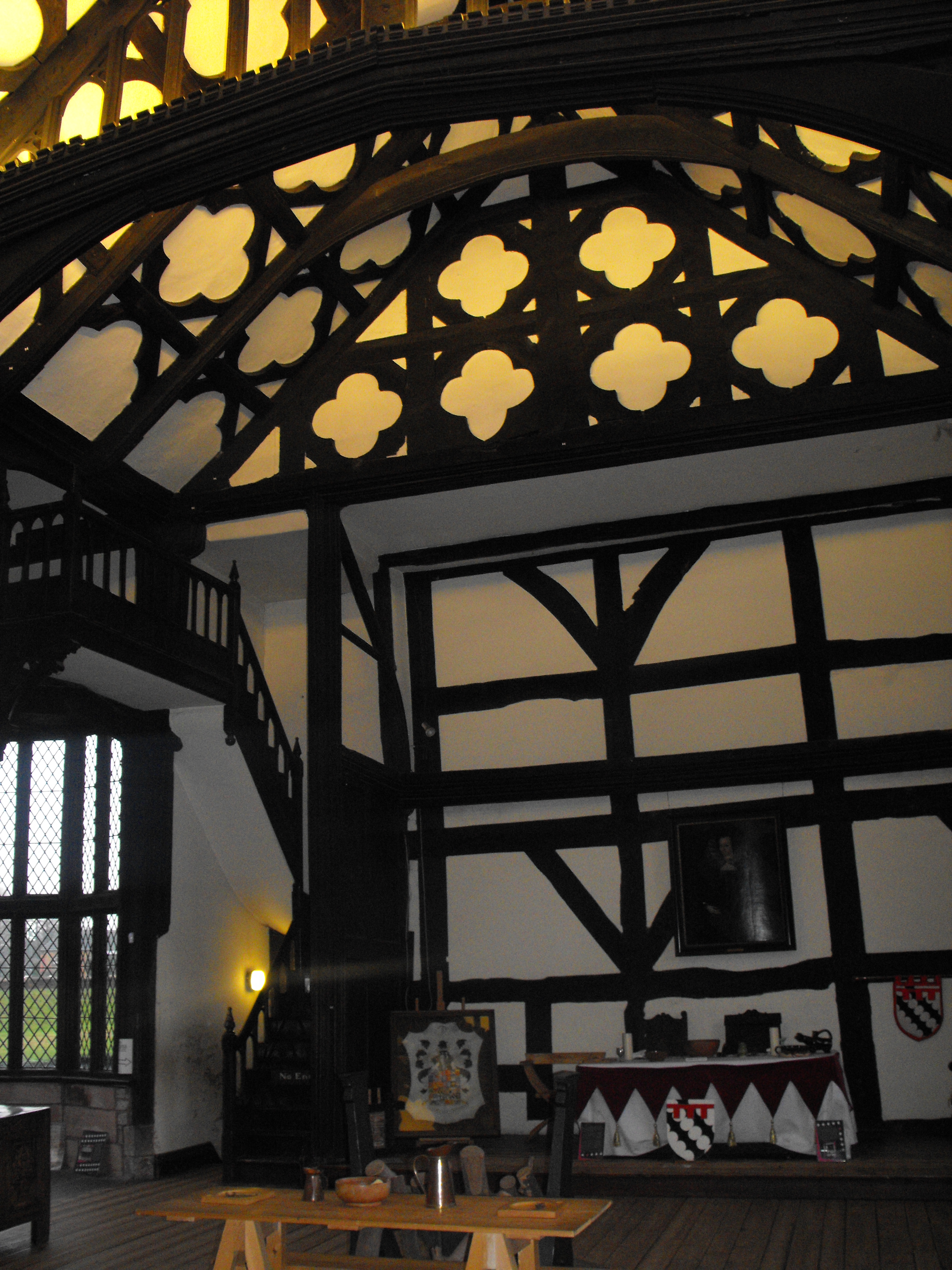
Ordsall Hall's Great Hall

Ordsall Hall is a Tudor mansion that was for over 300 years the home of the Radclyffe family. In more recent times it has been a working men's club and a school for clergy, the forerunner of the Manchester Theological College, amongst other uses. Like many old buildings, Ordsall Hall is said to be haunted, in particular by "the White Lady", who it is said threw herself off the balcony overlooking the Great Hall. An episode of the TV programme Most Haunted was filmed at the hall in 2002.

Ordsall Park

Ordsall Park is Salford's second oldest public park, established in 1876.

Salford Lads' Club

Ordsall is home to Salford Lads Club, which is featured on the inside cover of the album The Queen Is Dead by the pop band the Smiths. The club is on the corner of St Ignatius Walk and Coronation Street.

St Clement's Church

St. Clement's Church.

St Clement's Church is the Anglican parish church of Ordsall. The church was opened in 1877 and is now a Grade II listed building.

St Joseph's Church

St Joseph's Roman Catholic Church was one of the few buildings to have survived the Ordsall slum clearances. The church was designed by W. Randolph and cost £5,000 to build, equivalent to £530,000 today. It was opened on Sunday 20 April 1902. The building was severely damaged during the Manchester Blitz of Christmas 1940 and was restored over the following decades. However, it was demolished in 2021.

== Education ==
St. Joseph's RC Primary School was rated as outstanding in its 2007 Ofsted report, and one of the 100 top performing schools in the UK. Notable developments include a new primary school for the area, Primrose Hill, as well as an inner-city academy to be affiliated with MediaCityUK at Salford Quays.

== Cultural references ==
The now-demolished Archie Street was the inspiration for the TV soap opera Coronation Street, which began in 1960 and continues to be broadcast to the present day.

The BAFTA award-winning British comedy film East is East, released in 1999, was set in Monmouth Street, now demolished.

== Notable people ==
- Mark Addy (1838–1890), recipient of the Albert Medal (lifesaving) and a number of other honours, was the landlord of the Old Boathouse Inn, Everard Street off Ordsall Lane until his death in 1890.
- Joe Gladwin, actor, best known for his role as Wally Batty in the BBC sitcom Last of the Summer Wine, was born and brought up in Ordsall. He attended Mount Carmel RC School.
- Alistair Cooke, journalist and presenter of Letter from America, born in Ordsall before the family moved to Blackpool, in large part due to the young Cooke's health.
- Eddie Colman, footballer with Manchester United, one of the Busby Babes who was killed in the Munich air disaster, 6 February 1958 aged 21, was born in Archie Street, Ordsall.
- Alan Clarke and Graham Nash of The Hollies pop group grew up and attended school in Ordsall.
- Nigel Pivaro, Coronation Street actor and journalist, lived for many years in the area and has written about it. Pivaro lived first in West Park Street as a young child, before its demolition in the mid sixties, and later returned to live in Nine Acre Court.
- Tim Burgess of the band The Charlatans lived in Oldfield Road in the 1990s.
- Billy Garton, Manchester United footballer, lived in Ordsall while playing for the club.
- Peter Hook of the pop group New Order has many family members from the neighbourhood and was a member of Salford Lads Club.
- Paul Massey, Organised crime figure and Salford based businessman.

== See also ==
- Listed buildings in Salford, Greater Manchester
