= St Clement's Church, Ordsall =

Coordinates: 53.4724°N 2.2760°W

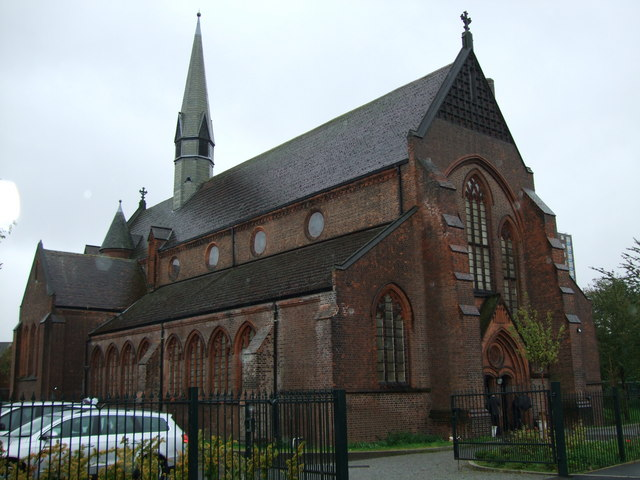
- St Clement's Church, Ordsall, from the northwest

- Location in Greater Manchester
- OS grid reference: SJ 818,973
- Location: Groves Avenue, Ordsall, Salford, Greater Manchester
- Country: England
- Denomination: Anglican
- Website: St Clement, Ordsall

History
- Status: Parish church

Architecture
- Functional status: Active
- Heritage designation: Grade II
- Designated: 18 January 1980
- Architect: Paley and Austin
- Architectural type: Church
- Style: Gothic Revival
- Groundbreaking: 1877
- Completed: 1878; 148 years ago

Administration
- Province: York
- Diocese: Manchester
- Archdeaconry: Salford
- Deanery: Salford
- Parish: Ordall and Salford Quays

Clergy
- Priest: Currently vacant

St Clement's Church is a Grade II listed building on Hulton Street, Ordsall, Salford, Greater Manchester, England. It is an active Anglican parish church in the Anglican Diocese of Manchester.

== History ==
The church was built between 1877 and 1878, and was designed by the Lancaster architects Paley and Austin at a cost of £9,000 (equivalent to £930,000 in 2025). The land for the church was given by Lord Egerton, who also paid for the church and its parsonage. The church closed in the 1980s, but re-opened around 2005.

The Anglican parish church is located on Groves Avenue, off Hulton Street, Ordsall, Salford, Greater Manchester. It can be seen from the Eccles line of the Manchester Metrolink. It is in the deanery of Salford, the archdeaconry of Salford and the diocese of Manchester. Its current minister is Rev. Sandra Kearney.

The church can be seen in the first set of closing titles of Coronation Street. Nearby St. Clement's Drive was built on the site of Archie Street, which was the model for Coronation Street itself.

== Architecture ==
St Clement's is constructed in red brick and terracotta and has a tiled roof. It is designed in a 13th-century gothic style. Its plan consists of a seven-bay nave with a clerestory, a chancel and north and south aisles. Above the chancel is a flèche with cladding in Westmorland slate. The nave and chancel are divided by buttresses across the aisles. Along the aisles are seven three-light windows. The clerestory contains round windows. The east end contains a five-light window, above which is an arch and gable with three stepped blind lancets, as well as heavy angle buttresses. At the west end is an unusual gabled portal in moulded brick with a roundel in terracotta containing tracery.

Inside the church the arcades are carried on round sandstone piers. The chancel is floored with Doulton tiles, and on its walls are murals depicting religious scenes, also in Doulton tiles. It also contains a tripartite sedilia. The chancel is vaulted. Part of the nave has been partitioned to form a meeting room. The two-manual organ was built by Willis.

It was designated as a Grade II listed building on 18 January 1980.

It also has an associated community hall.

== See also ==
- Listed buildings in Salford, Greater Manchester
- List of ecclesiastical works by Paley and Austin
