= St Luke's Church, Pendleton =

Church in the United Kingdom

Coordinates: 53.483923°N 2.302661°W

St Luke's Church
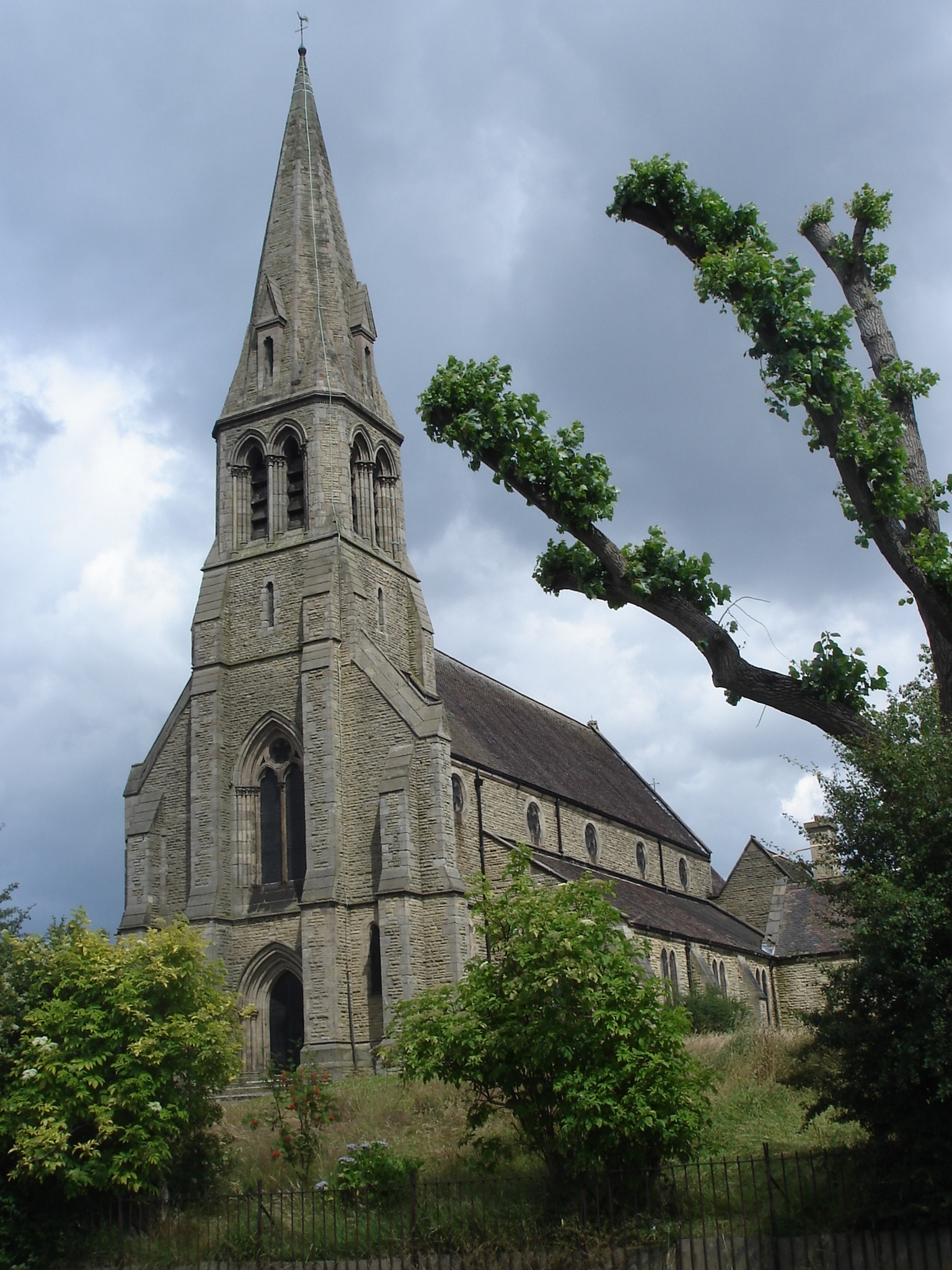
- St Luke's Church, Pendleton
- St Luke's Church
- Address: Liverpool Street, Salford, England

History
- Status: Active

Architecture
- Architect: George Gilbert Scott
- Style: Gothic Revival
- Completed: 1865

Administration
- Province: York
- Diocese: Anglican Diocese of Manchester

Clergy
- Rector: Daniel Burton
- Vicar: Charlie Gorton

Listed Building – Grade II*
- Official name: Church of St Luke
- Designated: 18 January 1980
- Reference no.: 1386145

St Luke's Church is an Anglican church that stands on raised ground in Liverpool Street, Pendleton, Salford. The church, in the parish of Weaste, Seedley and Langworthy, is part of the Salford All Saints Team Ministry in the Salford deanery and the Manchester diocese. It was designated as a Grade II* listed building in 1980.

== Architecture ==
The church was designed in the Neo-Gothic style by the architect George Gilbert Scott and opened in 1865. In 1878 a chancel chapel was added to the east end of the north aisle in memory of Edward Tootal, an early benefactor. The church is constructed of coursed sandstone rubble with a plain tiled roof. The nave has a clerestory and aisles and the tower is supported by large circular columns with carved capitals. The chancel has a striking decorated roof and a semicircular apse and attached parallel chapels. The church is rich in stained glass, some by Charles Eamer Kempe.

The organ was originally built in 1865 by the London-based firm, William Hill & Sons. It was rebuilt in 1947 by the Liverpool firm, Rushworth and Dreaper, and dedicated to those people of the Parish who lost their lives during the Second World War, (most of the original 1865 pipe work remains). From 1947 - 2006, the organist was Mr Eric Chadwick, FRMCM FRCO, who was the resident organist and Chorus Master to the Halle Orchestra until the mid 1970s. He was also Professor of Organ at the Royal Northern College of Music, past pupils include the renowned recitalist, Gordon Stewart. The organ is now in a bad state of repair, with the need of a major overhaul.

Since the building was renovated in the 1920s it has remained largely unchanged.

The church is currently on the National Heritage at Risk Register because of damage caused by its leaking roof.

The current incumbent is Daniel Burton.

== Events ==
Emmeline Goulden, leader of the British suffragette movement married Richard Pankhurst at St Luke's on 18 February 1879.

== See also ==
- Listed buildings in Salford, Greater Manchester
- List of new churches by George Gilbert Scott in Northern England
