= Ordsall Hall =

Historic country house in Ordsall, England

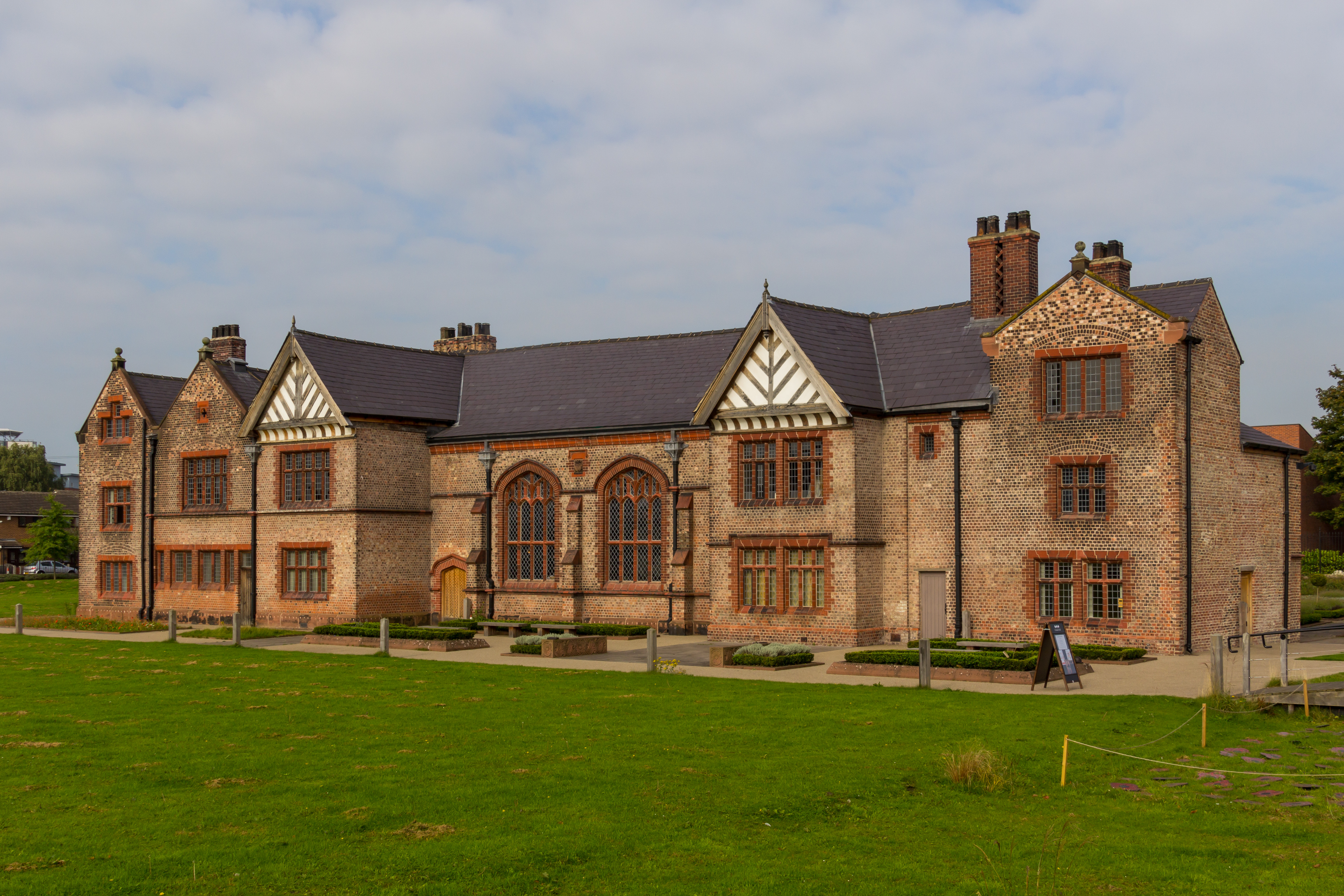
- Ordsall Hall in 2014

- Location within Greater Manchester

General information
- Location: Ordsall, Greater Manchester, England
- Coordinates: 53.469444°N 2.2775°W

Design and construction
- Designations

Listed Building – Grade I
- Official name: Ordsall Hall
- Designated: 31 January 1952
- Reference no.: 1386169

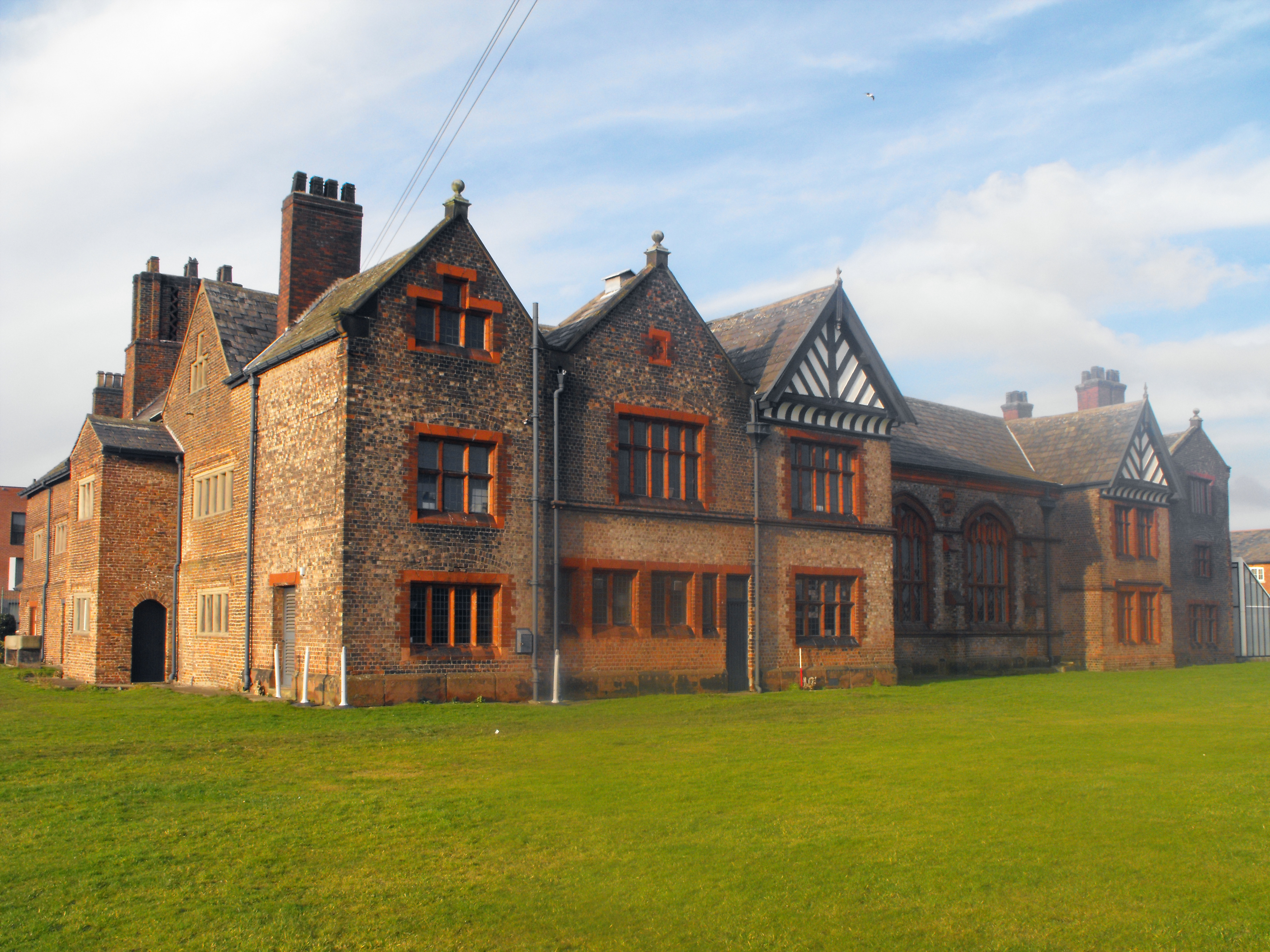
A view of the west side of the west wing, with the Great Hall in the centre

Ordsall Hall is a large former manor house in the historic parish of Ordsall, Lancashire, now part of the City of Salford, in Greater Manchester, England. It dates back more than 750 years, although the oldest surviving parts of the present hall were built in the 15th century. The most important period of Ordsall Hall's life was as the family seat of the Radclyffe family, who lived in the house for more than 300 years. The hall was the setting for William Harrison Ainsworth's 1842 novel Guy Fawkes, written around the plausible although unsubstantiated local story that the Gunpowder Plot of 1605 was planned in the house.

Since its sale by the Radclyffes in 1662, the hall has been put to many uses: a working men's club, a school for clergy, and a radio station among them. The house was bought by the old Salford Council in 1959 and opened to the public in 1972, as a period house and local history museum. The hall is a Grade I listed building, and entrance is free.

== History ==
Ordsall Hall is a formerly moated Tudor mansion, the oldest parts of which were built during the 13th century, although there has been a house on the site for over 750 years. David de Hulton is recorded as the owner of the original hall, in 1251. The manor of Ordsall came into the possession of the Radclyffe family in about 1335, but it was not until 1354 that Sir John Radclyffe established his right of inheritance. The manor was described in 1351 as a messuage, 120 acres (48.6 ha) of land, 12 acres (4.9 ha) of meadow and 12 acres (4.9 ha) of wood.

=== Radclyffe family home ===
Arms of Radcliffe: Argent, a bend engrailed sable

During the 1340s, Sir John Radclyffe campaigned with Edward III in France, distinguishing himself at the battles of Caen, Crécy and Calais. As a reward for his service, the King allowed Sir John to take some Flemish weavers back to his Ordsall estate, where he built cottages for them to live in. English weaving skills at that time were poor, and textiles from Manchester were considered to be of particularly poor quality, so the Flemish weavers were employed in instructing the local weavers. They also started up a silk weaving industry, the foundation for Manchester's later cotton industry.

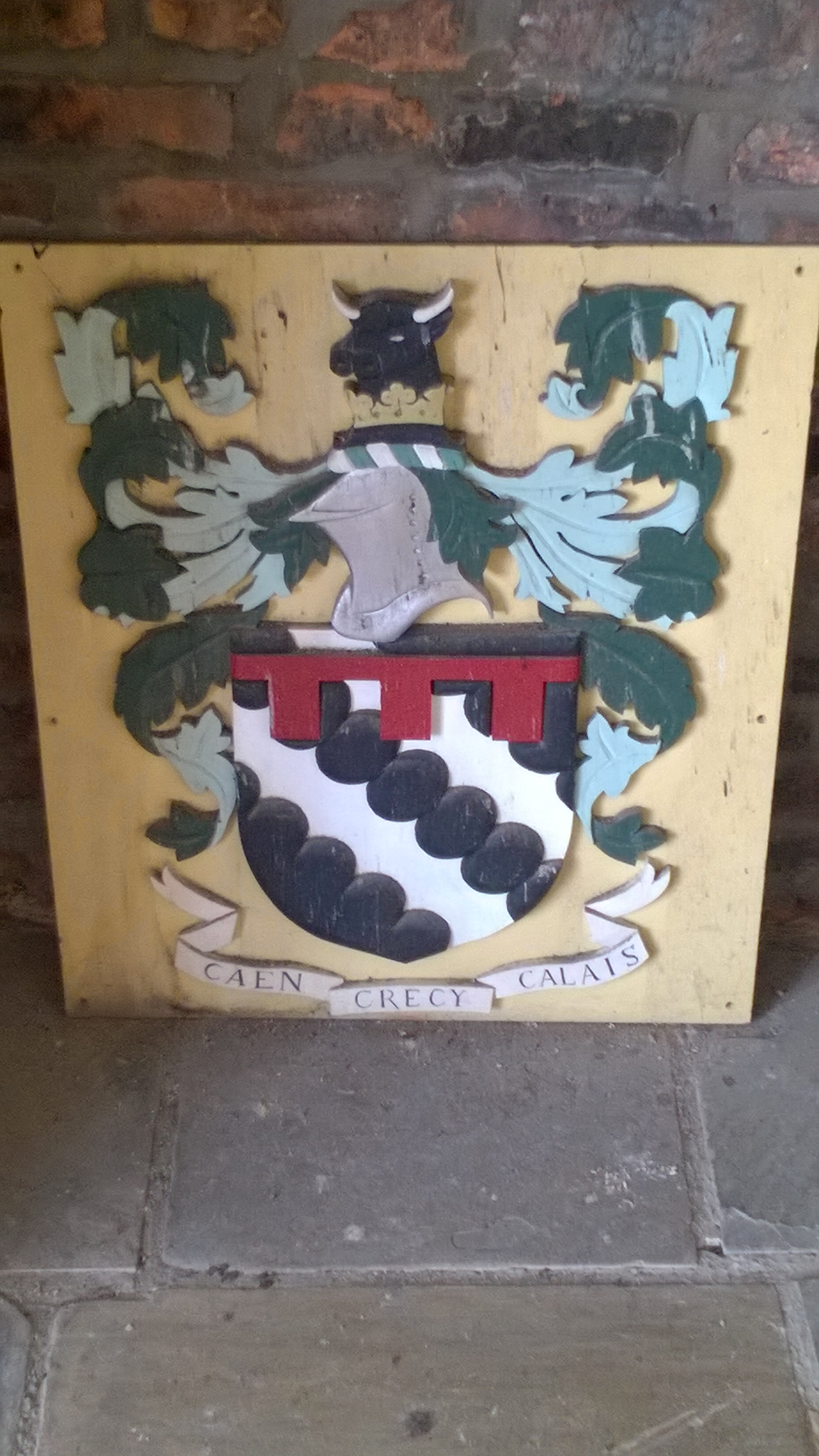
Coat of arms of the Radclyffe family, awarded to Sir John Radclyffe in the 1340s

The Dutch humanist and theologian Erasmus stayed at Ordsall Hall in 1499, and described it thus:

... the floors are made of clay and are covered with layers of rushes, constantly replenished, so that the bottom layer remains for 20 years harbouring spittle, vomit, the urine of dogs and men, the dregs of beer, the remains of fish and other nameless filth ...

The original cruck hall was replaced by the present Great Hall in 1512, after Sir Alexander Radclyffe was appointed High Sheriff of Lancashire. The hall is typical of others built at that time in the northwest of England, although it is one of the largest, and is unusual for the period in having no wall fireplace. The hall has an elaborate roof structure, as in the similar Rufford Old Hall. There is a slightly later small room above the large oriel bay, which may be an early addition as at Samlesbury Hall.

Other alterations and additions were made during the 17th century, including a modest brick house added onto the west end in 1639, perhaps intended as a home for Sir Alexander's bailiff, as he himself no longer used the hall as his main residence by that time. The house was built at 90° to the timber-framed building, to which it was later joined. During the Civil War Sir Alexander, as a Royalist, was imprisoned and suffered financial hardship. Reduced means eventually forced his heir, John Radclyffe, into selling the hall to Colonel Samuel Birch in 1662, thus ending more than 300 years of his family's occupation.

=== Later use ===
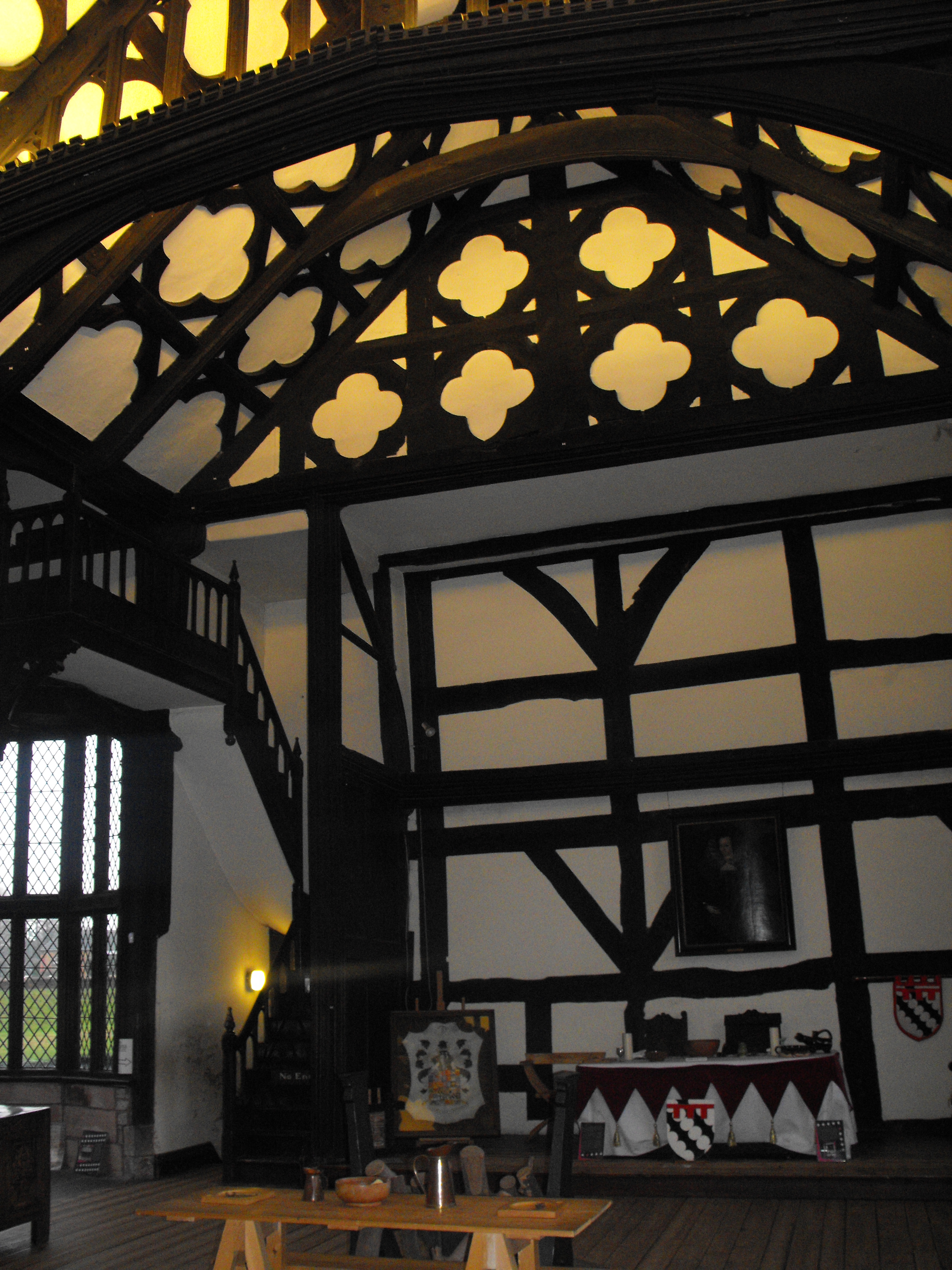
The Great Hall. The corridor to the left of the staircase leads to the Star Chamber.

At the time of the 1666 hearth tax survey, Ordsall Hall was the largest house in Salford, with 19 hearths. The Oldfield family of Leftwich, near Northwich, bought the estate at the end of the 17th century, and in 1704 it was sold again, to John Stock, a trustee of Cross Street Chapel. His family were probably the last owners to reside at the hall. The Stocks lived in the hall's central section, comprising "a large hall, lounge dining room, a chapel, six rooms on a floor, with brewhouse, large courts, stable, etc", while the two wings were leased to tenants from about 1700. In 1756, the hall was sold to Samuel Hill of Shenstone, Staffordshire. Two years later, on Hill's death, the house passed to his nephew, Samuel Egerton of Tatton.

The hall remained in occupation until 1871, the last residents being the descendants of John Markendale, who had taken over the lease of the building in 1814. The land surrounding the hall was used by the Mather family of cowkeepers and butchers for many years. During the last quarter of the 19th century, Ordsall Hall became engulfed "in mean streets and industry". From 1875, Haworth's Mill rented the hall and used it as a working men's club. The Great Hall was converted into a gymnasium after being cleared of the inserted floor and later partitions, and provision was made elsewhere for billiards, a skittle alley, and a bowling green. In 1883, the hall was bought by Wilbraham Egerton, 2nd Baron Egerton, and restored during 1896–98 by the Manchester architect Alfred Darbyshire at a cost of £6,000 (equivalent to £834,000 in 2024 (Note: United Kingdom Gross Domestic Product deflator figures follow the MeasuringWorth "consistent series" supplied in Thomas, Ryland; Williamson, Samuel H. (2026), "What Was the U.K. GDP Then?", MeasuringWorth)). The restoration allowed Lord Egerton to found a clergy training school at the hall. Provisions for the school included the construction of a church dedicated to St Cyprian in the north forecourt, and a new servants' wing on the south side. In 1908, the school was moved to Egerton Hall, changing its name to the Manchester Theological College. The men's social club at Ordsall Hall survived until 1940. During the Second World War, the hall was used as a radio station. In the 1960s, the church and servants' wing built for the clergy school were demolished.

Salford Corporation purchased Ordsall Hall from the executors of Maurice Egerton, 4th Baron Egerton in 1959. After major restoration work, it was opened to the public in April 1972, as a period house and local history museum. Like many old buildings, Ordsall Hall has stories of hauntings. A White Lady who is said to appear in the Great Hall or Star Chamber is popularly believed to be Margaret Radclyffe, who died of a broken heart in 1599 following the death in Ireland of her brother, Alexander.

In March 2007, the Extraordinary Ordsall Campaign applied for a grant of £5.1 million from the Heritage Lottery Fund, to regenerate Ordsall Hall and secure its future. After supporters had raised £1 million by September 2008, the Heritage Lottery Fund provided the remaining £4.1 million. Only 40 per cent of the building was then open to the public, but following restoration work further rooms were expected to be opened. The building closed for refurbishment in early 2009, and re-opened to the public on 15 May 2011. In 2013, the newly restored building received a Bronze Award in the Small Visitor Attraction category organised by tourist body VisitEngland, one of 320 nominations from across the country.

== Architecture ==
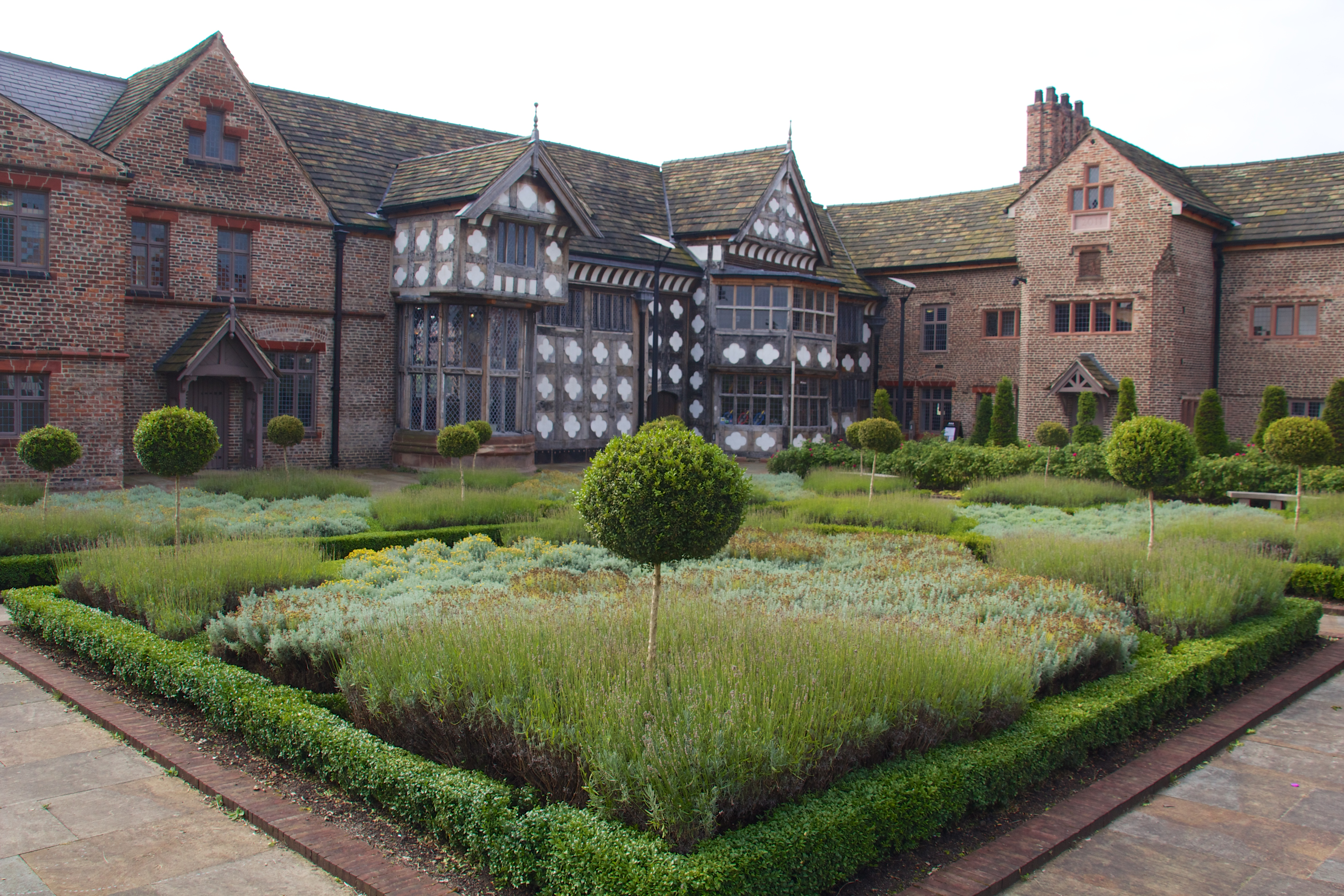
Ordsall Hall from the east, showing the south range to the left and the west range to the right

There are two separate elements to the present-day house: the timber-framed south range built in the 15th century, and the brick west range constructed in 1639. The hall was originally built around a central quadrangle, but the other wings making up that space are no longer present. Drawing on the earliest description of the house, from 1380, Salford City Council describes how it comprised "a hall, five chambers, a kitchen and a chapel. It was associated with two stables, three granges, two shippons, a garner, a dovecote, an orchard and a windmill, together with 80 acres (32 ha) of arable land and 6 acres (2.4 ha) of meadow."

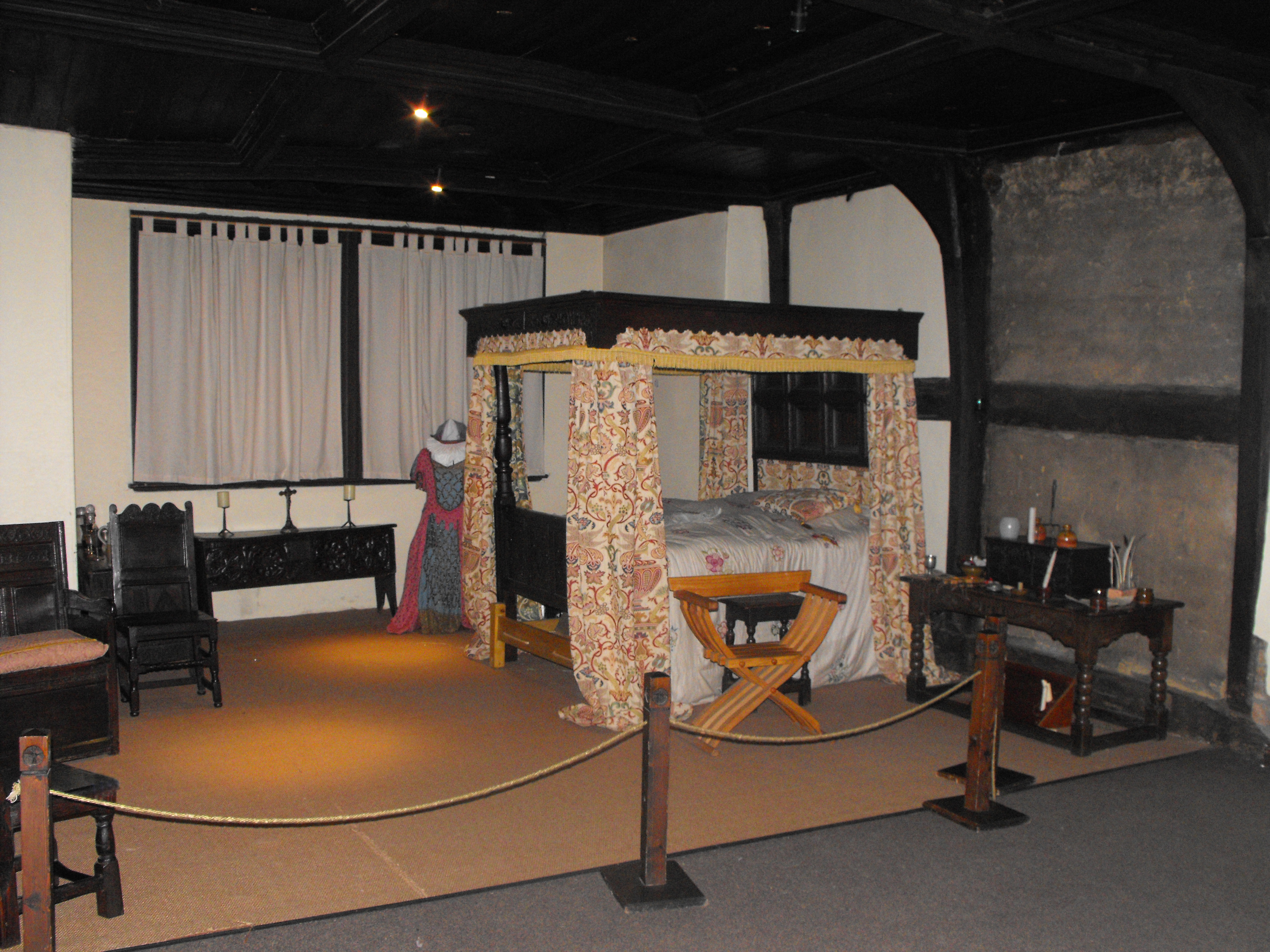
The Star Chamber, which takes its name from the lead stars on its ceiling, leads off the Great Hall; it and the solar above – a private upper room that would have contained a bed – are the oldest remaining parts of the hall.

Substantial alterations appear to have taken place during the early years of Samuel Egerton's ownership in the mid-18th century. The canopy at the dais end of the Great Hall was destroyed – although part of it can still be seen in the north wall – when a floor was inserted and new rooms were formed with lath and plaster partitions. The east wing of the hall was probably demolished at about the same time, but certainly before 1812, the date of the earliest estate map.

There are believed to have been underground passages leading from the hall into Manchester. One, running under the River Irwell to the Hanging Bridge Hotel at the northern end of Deansgate, was described in 1900, following the rediscovery of the Hanging Bridge after it had been buried for 200 years:

... I was shown a door in Hanging Bridge Hotel cellar where the arches could be seen and a door made up ... it was the entrance to an underground passage under the Irwell, possibly to Ordsall Hall ... the owner had not traversed the passage himself, but the previous owner had, but had to turn back because of bad smells ....

— Letter to the Manchester Guardian, April 1900

== Guy Fawkes ==
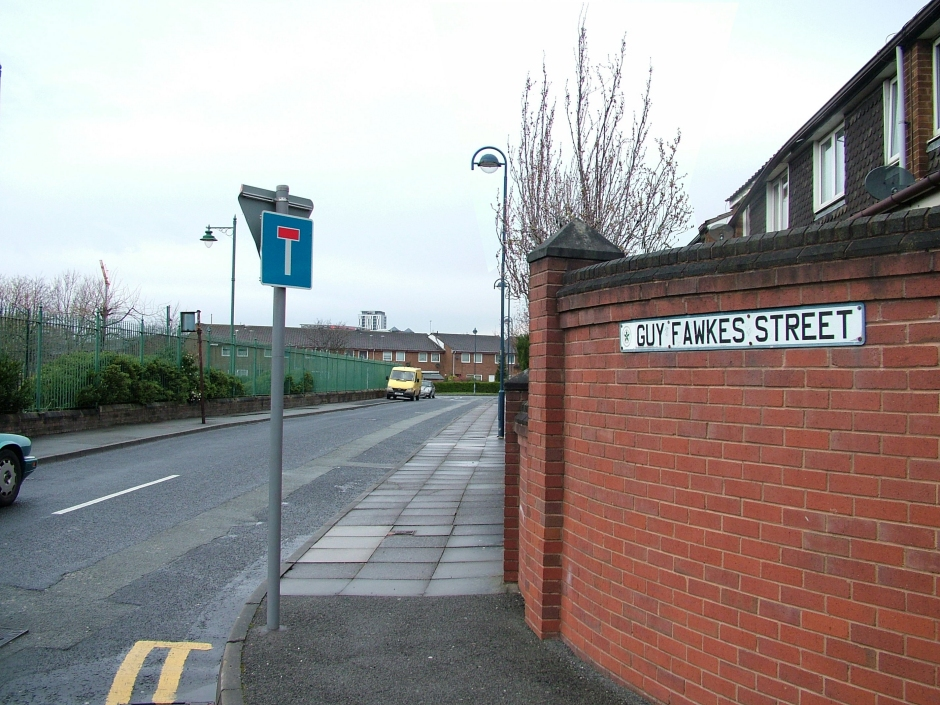
Guy Fawkes Street runs down the eastern side of the hall.

Harrison Ainsworth, in his 1842 novel Guy Fawkes, wrote about the local story that the Gunpowder Plot of 1605 was planned by Guy Fawkes and Robert Catesby in Ordsall Hall's Star Chamber. Fawkes is supposed to have escaped capture by the King's soldiers by way of a tunnel from Ordsall Hall to an inn at the cathedral end of Hanging Bridge, at the northern end of present-day Deansgate. There is no firm supporting evidence, but the Radclyffes were prominent Roman Catholics and were acquainted with the Catesby family. The legend is remembered in the name of the modern road that runs to the east of the hall, Guy Fawkes Street.

== Gallery ==
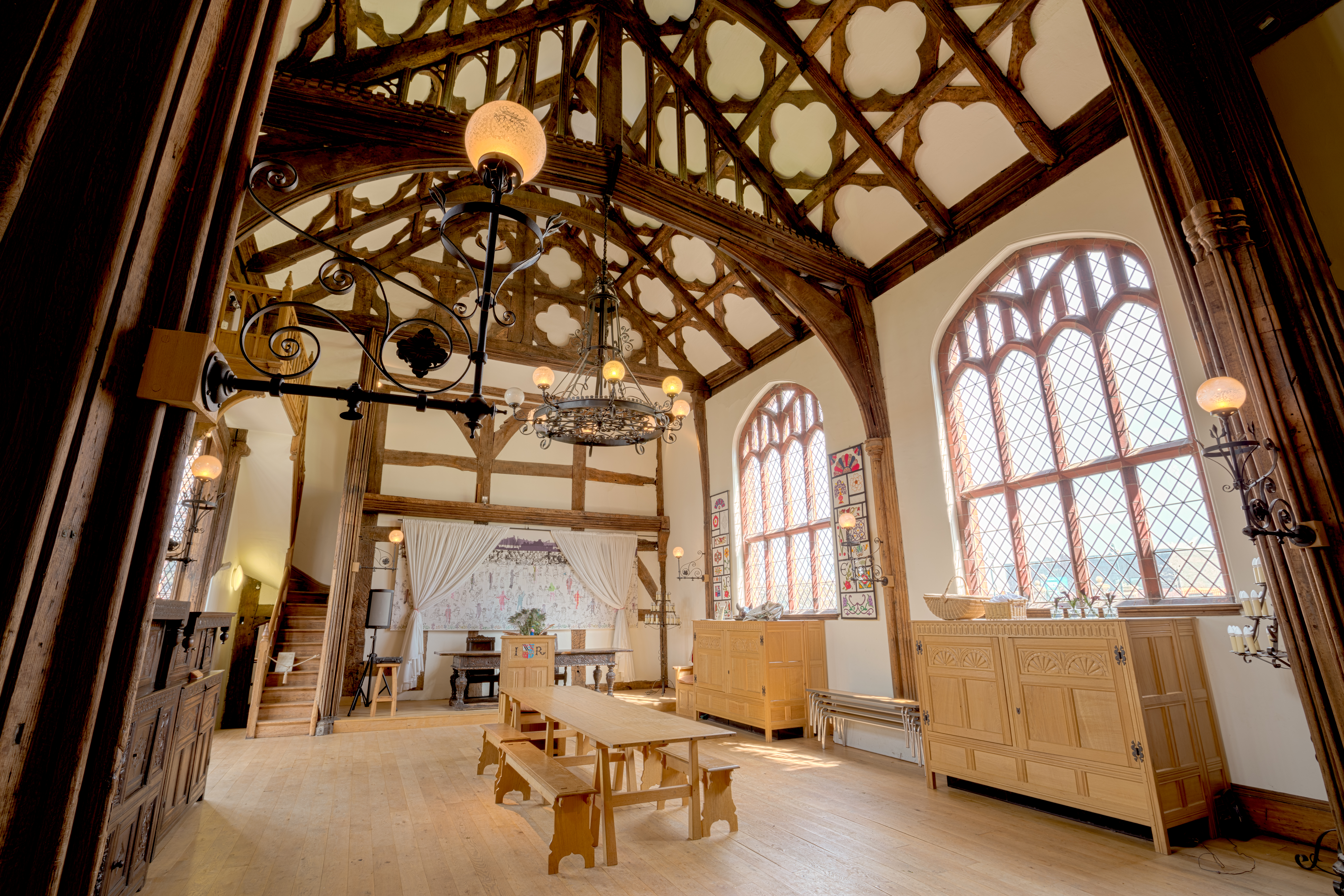
The Great Hall

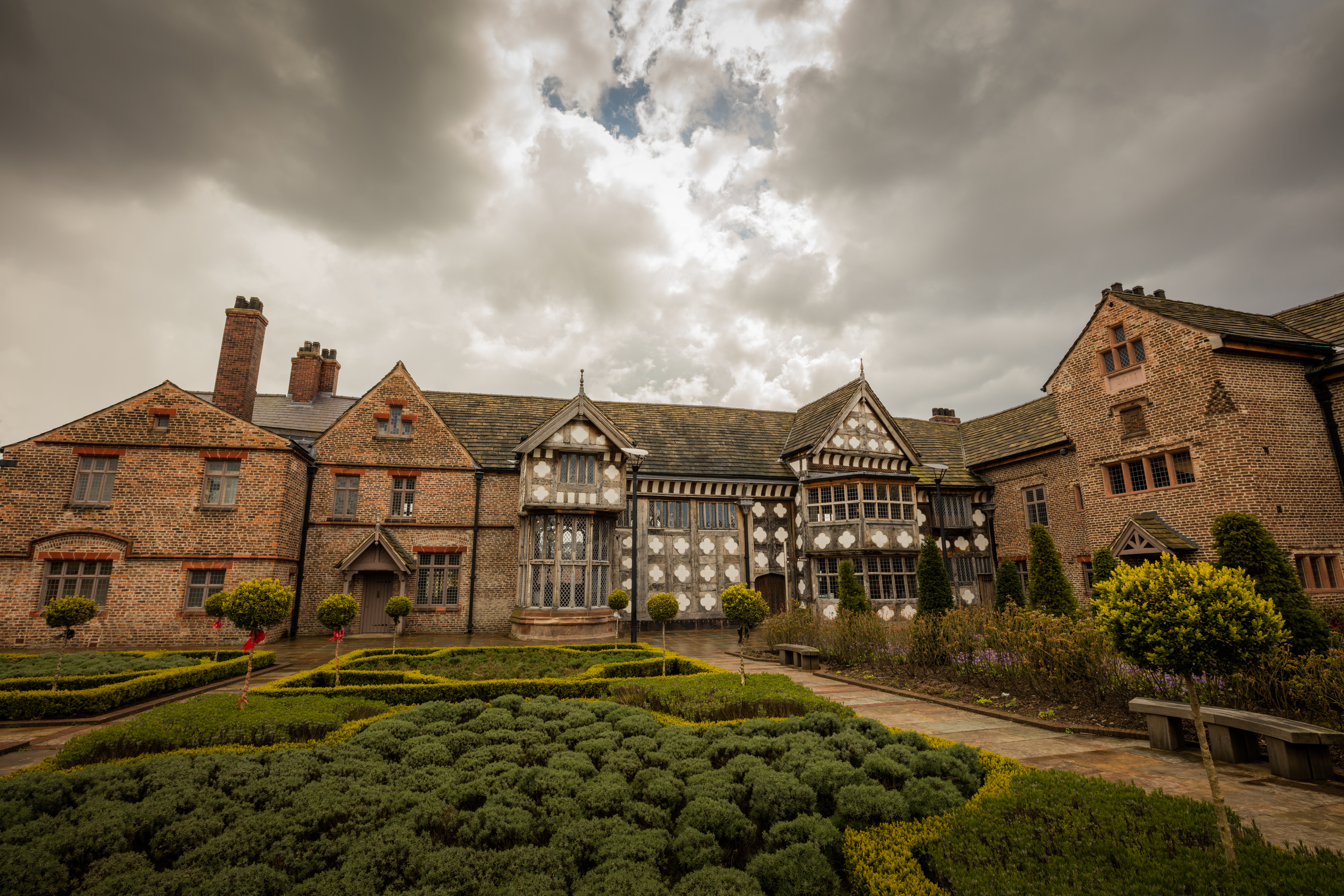
The Exterior

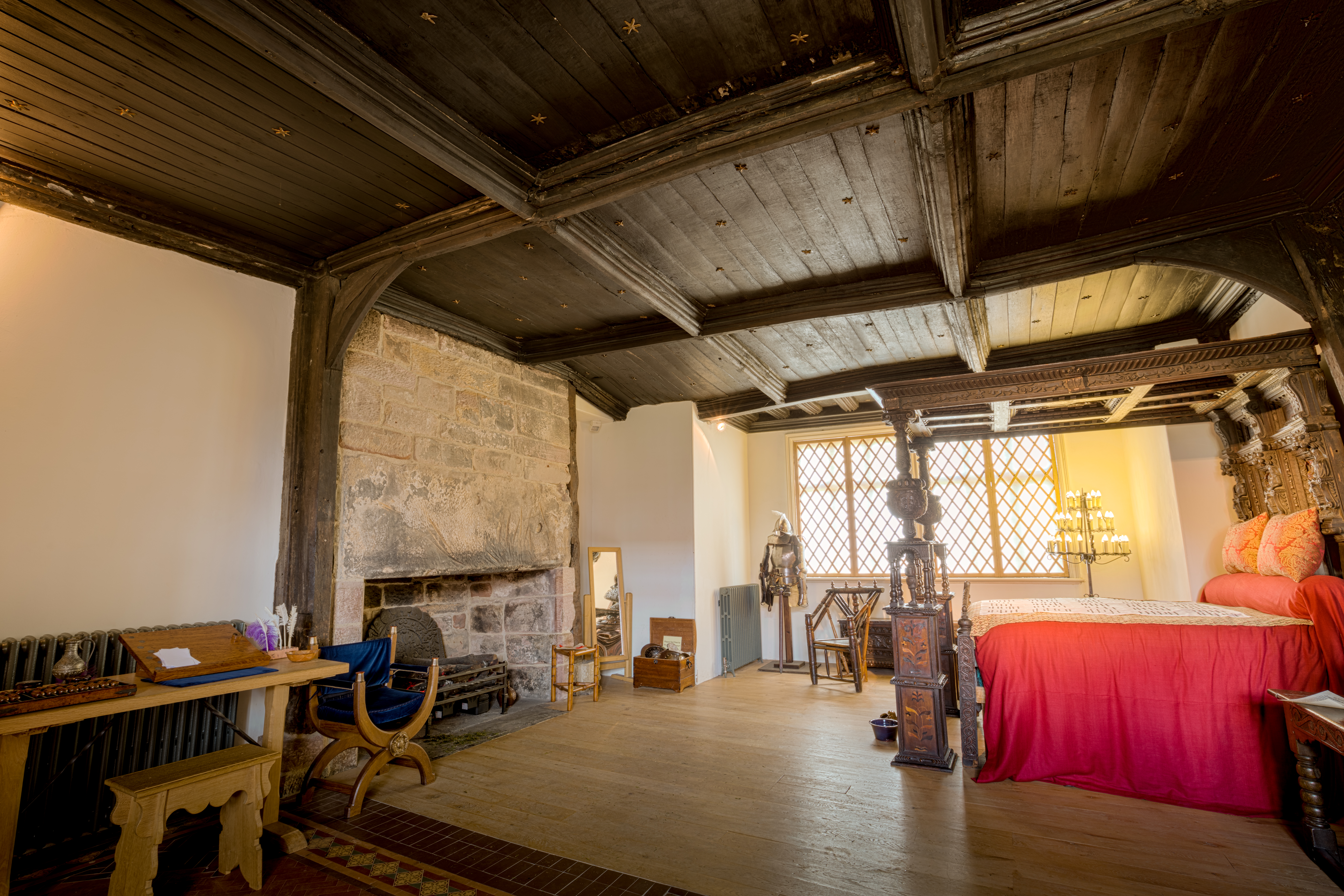
The Star Chamber

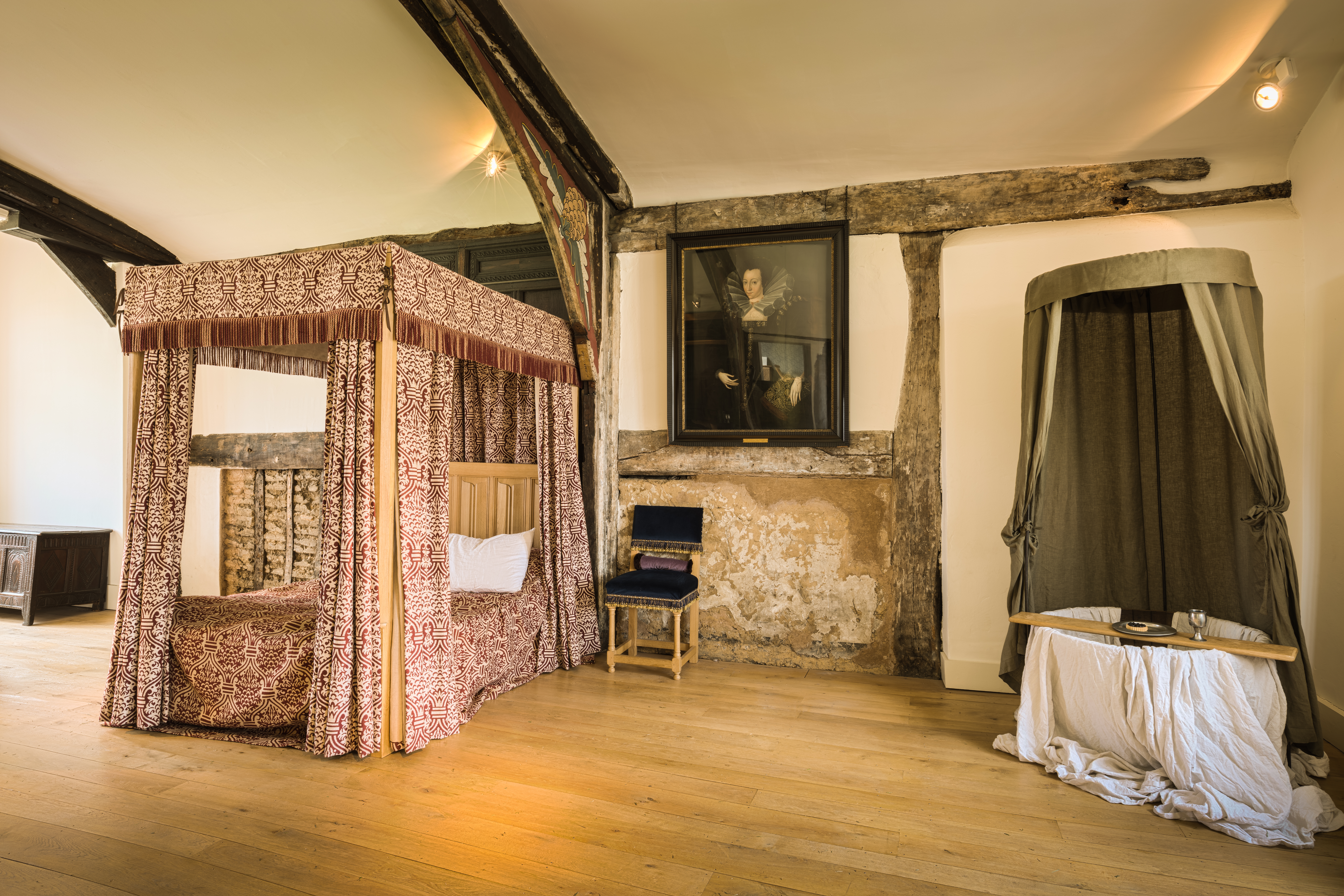
The Great Chamber

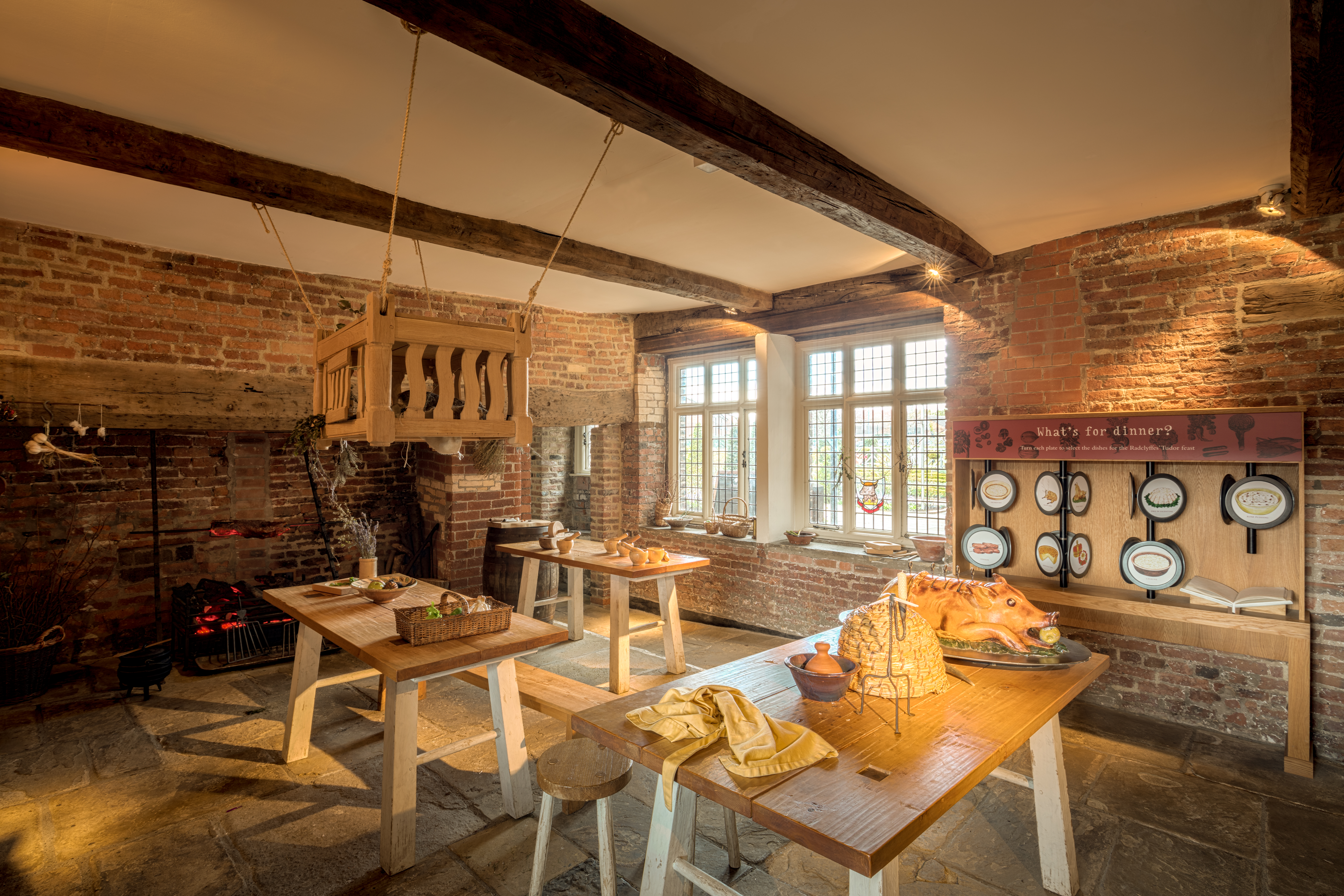
The Kitchen

== See also ==
- Grade I listed buildings in Greater Manchester
- Listed buildings in Salford, Greater Manchester
