= Guy Fawkes (novel) =

1840 novel by William Harrison Ainsworth

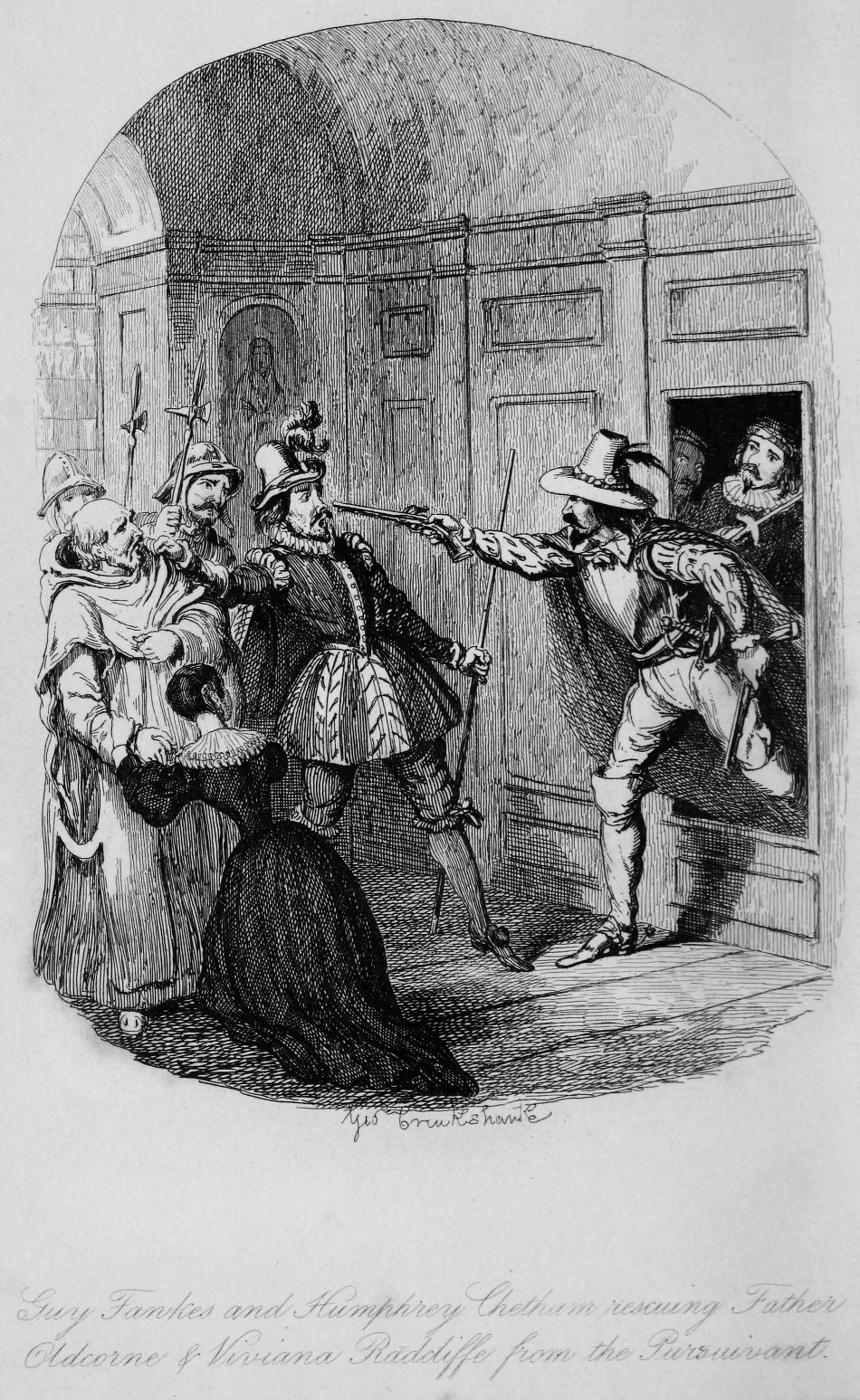
Frontispiece illustration by George Cruikshank to the 1841 first edition

The novel Guy Fawkes first appeared as a serial in Bentley's Miscellany, between January and November 1840. It was subsequently published as a three-volume set in July 1841, with illustrations by George Cruikshank. The first of William Harrison Ainsworth's seven "Lancashire novels", the story is based on the Gunpowder Plot of 1605, an unsuccessful attempt to blow up the Houses of Parliament. Ainsworth relied heavily on historical documents describing the trial and execution of the conspirators, of whom Fawkes was one, but he also embellished the known facts. He invented the character of Viviana Radcliffe, daughter of the prominent Radcliffe family of Ordsall Hall – who becomes Fawkes's wife – and introduced gothic and supernatural elements into the story, such as the ability of the alchemist, John Dee, to raise the spirits of the dead.

The novel was very popular, and marked the beginning of Ainsworth's 40-year career in historical romances, but it was not universally admired. Edgar Allan Poe described the style of writing as "turgid pretension".

== Background and publication ==
During 1840, Ainsworth simultaneously wrote The Tower of London and Guy Fawkes, both initially published as serials. The stories began their publication in January 1840; Guy Fawkes was published in instalments in Bentley's Miscellany until November 1840. Ainsworth serialised the story again in his own magazine, Ainsworth's Magazine, in 1849–50.

As well as the two serialisations, the story has been published as a novel on seven occasions. The first, produced by Richard Bentley, the owner of Bentley's Miscellany, appeared in July 1841, as a 3-volume set illustrated by George Cruikshank. Two American editions and a French edition were published in the same year. Routledge published three further editions, in 1842, 1857, and 1878.

== Plot summary ==
The story of Guy Fawkes starts in summer 1605, when a plot to blow up Parliament was underway. The first book of the story begins with the execution of Catholic priests in Manchester. During the execution, Elizabeth Orton madly raves before being chased by an officer overseeing the execution. To avoid capture, she leaps into the River Irwell. She is pulled up by Humphrey Chetham, a Protestant member of the nobility, and Guy Fawkes, a Catholic. After she is brought out of the water, she predicts that both men will be executed before she dies. The novel transitions to Lancashire and the Radcliffe family. William Radcliffe is a supporter of the plot, and his daughter, Viviana Radcliffe, is revealed to love both Chetham and Fawkes. Fawkes travels to John Dee, an alchemist, who is able to call forth the ghost of Orton. The ghost warns Fawkes again. This is not the only time Fawkes is warned, as he receives a vision from God that the plot will end in disaster. During this time, the Radcliffe family is exposed as hiding two priests, which provokes the destruction of the home by the British Army. Having lost their home, the conspirators in the plot travel to London.

In the second book, Fawkes and Viviana Radcliffe marry, and she tries to convince her new husband not to continue with the plot. Fawkes argues that he is bound to follow through with events. The book ends when the conspiracy to blow up Parliament fails on 5 November 1605 and Fawkes is arrested.

The third book deals with the trial of Fawkes and the other plotters. They are all held in the Tower of London, and Viviana, who is by then dying, convinces Fawkes to repent. Eventually, he does so as she dies, following which he is executed. The book ends with the execution of the last of the plotters, Father Garnet.

== Themes ==
Guy Fawkes, like The Tower of London, deals with British politics and history. The events of the novel deal with the execution of Catholic priests and the plot to destroy Parliament. Ainsworth also employs gothic elements such as Chat Moss, a bog near Manchester, to add a terrifying component to the novel. Another gothic element, a cave that was connected to pagan worship, is a setting early on in the book and represents a connection between historical events. The use of prophecy in the work is related to the act of necromancy, which distinguishes Ainsworth from earlier authors, who incorporated Catholic superstitions in their use of the gothic. Instead, Ainsworth has both Christianity and the supernatural as part of one world. This reflects a view that the contemporary rationalism is lacking the same character as the world had when both magic, religion, and science were within one system. The character John Dee represents this link, as he is an alchemist.

The alchemist John Dee tells Fawkes that the plot will not help the Catholic Church, and will only result in the death of the plotters. Fawkes's vision of St Winifred on his trip to her well, a Catholic shrine, also tells him that the plot will fail, because Heaven does not approve of it. Both sides are warning Fawkes about his doom, emphasising the novel's tragic and gothic themes.

In terms of Fawkes and the plotters' desires to restore Catholicism as the dominant religion in England, this issue came up again during the time surrounding 1840 as there were fears about such events happening after moves to repeal various legislation. Two laws from the late 17th century, Corporation (1661) and The Test (1673), were repealed in 1828 and allowed for Catholics to have more rights. The repeals and the Emancipation Act (1829) allowed for Irish Catholics to have more rights, which preceded a large Irish immigration into English cities. This also sparked anti-Catholic sentiment once again in England. In response, Ainsworth promoted the idea of toleration between the faiths.

Ainsworth uses his female characters in two ways, exemplified by the Cassandra-like Elizabeth Orton, who warns Fawkes of his future, and Viviana Radcliffe, a figure of feminine beauty that dies. Radcliffe is an ideal woman in a Victorian aesthetic sense. She is obedient to her father to the point of dying for his cause, in contrast to the independent females of Ainsworth's other novels. Radcliffe is a victim, able to see that the plot is doomed, but unable to escape because she is bonded by her vows of marriage. Of his major Catholic characters Ainsworth said:

In Viviana Radcliffe I have sought to portray the loyal and devout Catholic, such as I conceive the character to have existed at the period. In Catesby, the unscrupulous and ambitious plotter, masking his designs under the cloak of religion. In Garnet, the subtle, and yet sincere, Jesuit. And in Fawkes, the gloomy and superstitious enthusiast.

== Sources ==
The character of John Dee is based on a real individual, and Ainsworth uses Dee's book, Relations with Spirits, for information on the occult. The appearance of Saint Winifred is rooted in a legend from the North Wales area of Holywell. She was a virgin girl who rejected a prince and as a result was beheaded. She was brought back to life, and the spot where she had lost her head instantly became a fountain that could cure people.

The novel's background deals with the Gunpowder Plot, a major historical event in English history. However, there are also many theories and conspiracies that describe the basis of the plot. Public opinion afterward was manipulated to further anti-Catholic sentiment, and many of the details are unknown, especially of who warned the government that the plot was taking place a week before Fawkes was to blow up Parliament. Ainsworth says that Lord Monteagle addressed a letter to himself, to let others know of the plot, because Monteagle believed the destruction would damage the Catholic cause. Ainsworth relies heavily on the historical documents, including accounts of the trial and executions of the conspirators.

== Critical response ==
Guy Fawkes, along with The Tower of London, began Ainsworth's 40-year career in historical romances. It was a very popular work, but it was not universally admired. In 1841, Edgar Allan Poe wrote in a review of the work that it was "positively beneath criticism and beneath contempt". He went on to say: "The design of Mr. Ainsworth has been to fill, for a certain sum of money, a stipulated number of pages".

S. M. Ellis, in 1911, said that Guy Fawkes "had been a great financial success, and, it is said, Ainsworth received as much as £1,500 from it. The real reason for this success is not far to seek, for the work is one of the best of historical novels. It arrests attention by its continuity of interest. Incident follows incident, exciting escape upon terrible adventure; on and on – without pause or longueur – the dramatic narrative proceeds, until the inevitable tragic end is reached." In 1972, George Worth argued: "All is well during the first two of the three parts of Guy Fawkes ... But in the third section ... Ainsworth rather badly lets his audience down." Writing in 2003, Stephen Carver claimed that "Although critics are often scathing of this author, Guy Fawkes Book the Second is a reasonable history lesson". Ainsworth's novel transformed Fawkes into an "acceptable fictional character", and Fawkes subsequently began to appear in children's books and penny dreadfuls.
