= Weaste =

Coordinates: 53.483°N 2.293°W

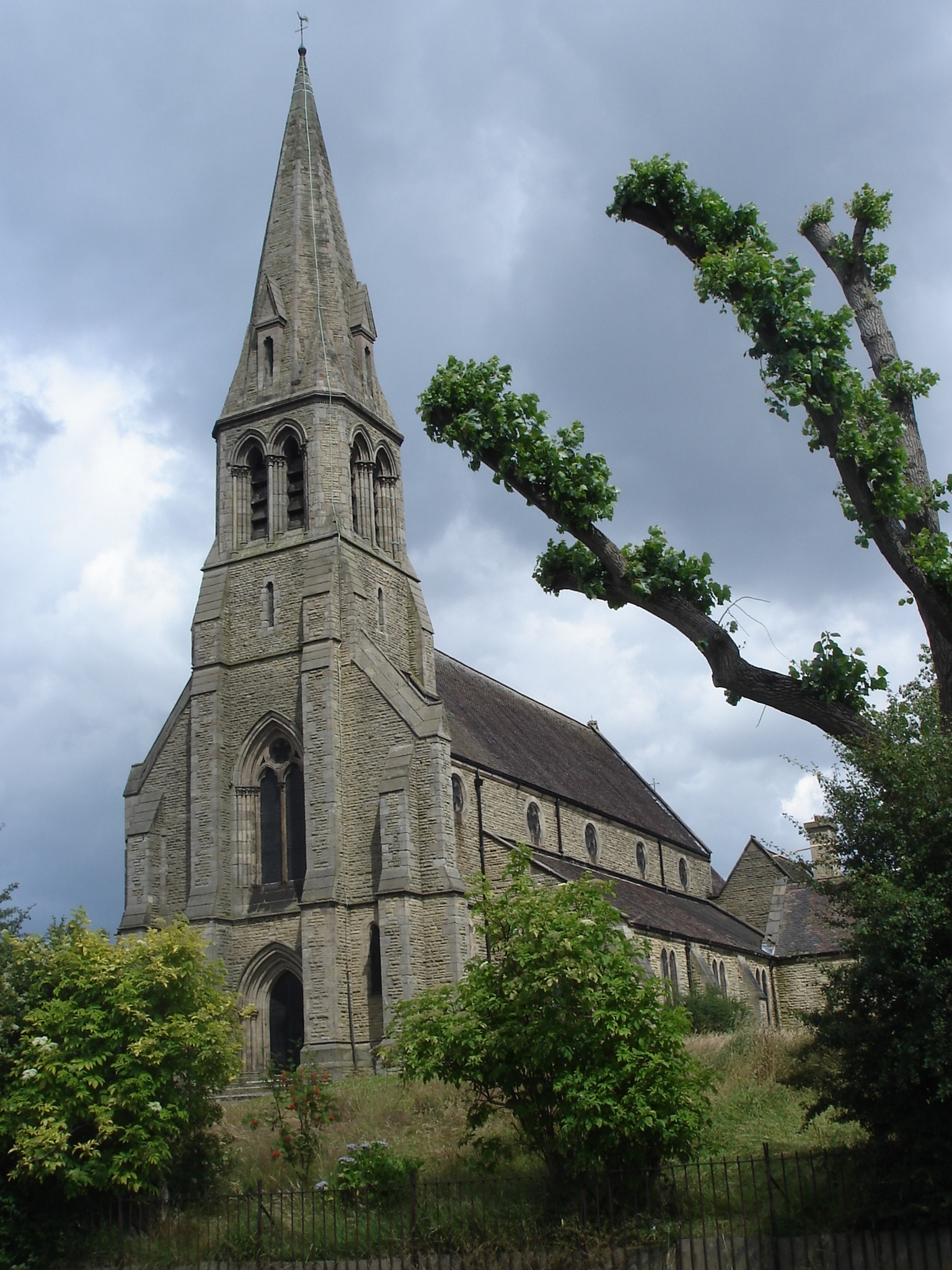
- St Luke's Church, a Grade II* listed building in Weaste

- Location within Greater Manchester
- Population: 12,616 Ward profile conducted by Salford City Council in 2014
- OS grid reference: SJ805985
- Metropolitan borough: Salford
- Metropolitan county: Greater Manchester
- Region: North West
- Country: England
- Sovereign state: United Kingdom
- Post town: SALFORD
- Postcode district: M5
- Dialling code: 0161
- Police: Greater Manchester
- Fire: Greater Manchester
- Ambulance: North West
- UK Parliament: Salford

Weaste (/wiːst/) is an inner-city suburb of Salford, Greater Manchester, England. It is bordered by the town of Eccles to the West and Seedley to the East. In 2014 Weaste and Seedley ward had a population of 12,616.

== History ==
The name either comes from the English word waste meaning "uncultivated land, common" in local dialect or from Old French waste meaning "common land, waste".

=== Textiles and the Industrial Revolution ===
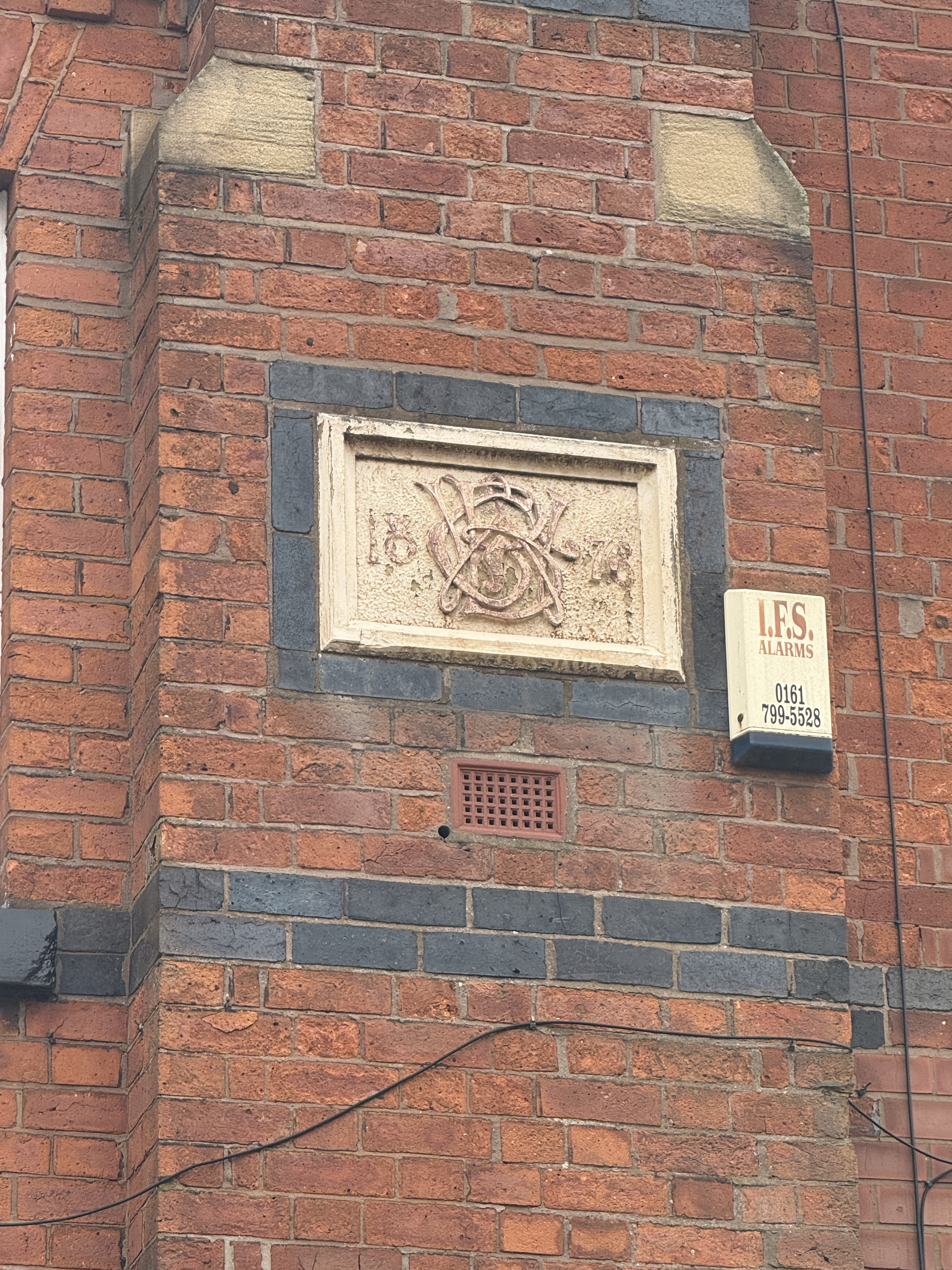
A datestone in Weaste on a house wall near where the Victoria Mills used to stand depicting the letters WBC (Winterbottom Bookcloth Company) and year 1876.

19th-century cotton firm Ermen & Engels—part-owned by the father of Friedrich Engels—established Victoria Mills, a factory making sewing threads, in 1837 near the now-closed Weaste railway station on the Liverpool and Manchester Railway line. Friedrich worked for the factory in its offices for a period of time starting in 1842.

Victoria Mills was later sold to Archibald Winterbottom in 1874 after two years of negotiations. He used the site to found Winterbottom Book Cloth Co Ltd. The company produced bookcloth—a material used for hardcover binding—and tracing cloth. The site was expanded in the following years by the addition of new buildings and a chimney which was amongst the tallest in Lancashire at the time. The company was immensely successful and saw Victoria Mills in Weaste become the top manufacturer of tracing cloth and bookcloth in the world.

It kept producing bookcloth until 1980. By 1982 a property developer had bought the remaining buildings and the site was turned into an industrial area.

=== Religion ===
In 1892 the All Souls Roman Catholic church was built on Bute street (later renamed to Kintyre Avenue) in Weaste next to the All Souls Primary School. In 1934 a new church building was opened in Weaste at the intersection of Liverpool Street and Weaste Lane to replace the church on Bute Street. The funeral of Albert Scanlon (one of the Busby Babes and survivor of the Munich air disaster) was held in this church in 2010. The church was demolished in 2011 and a residential development was built in its place.

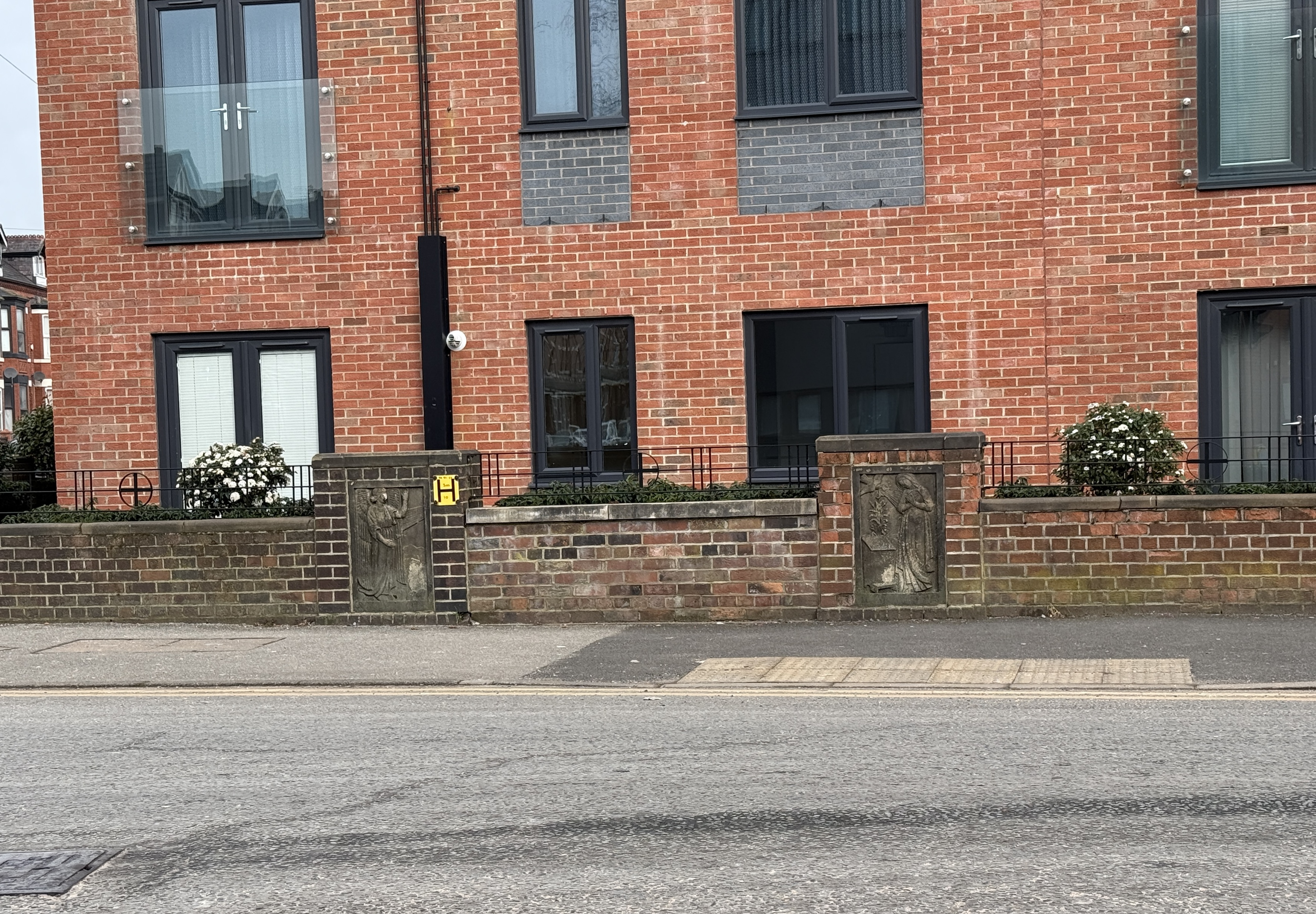
All Souls RC church's original garden wall with ornamental masonry was kept after its demolition and is now used by the residential development built in its place.

=== Education ===
The De La Salle College was a secondary school located near the intersection of Weaste Lane and Eccles Old Road. The school was established by the Roman Catholic parish of Salford which purchased the site containing a mansion called Hopefield in 1924. By 1926 a secondary school for boys had been established on the site and was being run by the De La Salle Brothers. The school merged with Pendleton College in 1997 and took its name. It was closed in 2012 and demolished in 2015 to make space for a residential development.

Its notable alumni included the Salfordians Terry Eagleton and Tony Wilson.

== Governance ==
Weaste was historically part of the County Borough of Salford in Lancashire. In 1974 it became part of the newly-incorporated metropolitan borough of the City of Salford which itself is within the metropolitan county of Greater Manchester.

The electoral ward of Weaste and Seedley is represented in Westminster by Rebecca Long-Bailey, MP for Salford as of February 2025.

As of February 2025, the ward is represented on Salford City Council by three Labour councillors: Philip Cusack, Alexis Shama, and Charlotte Youd.

== Landmarks ==
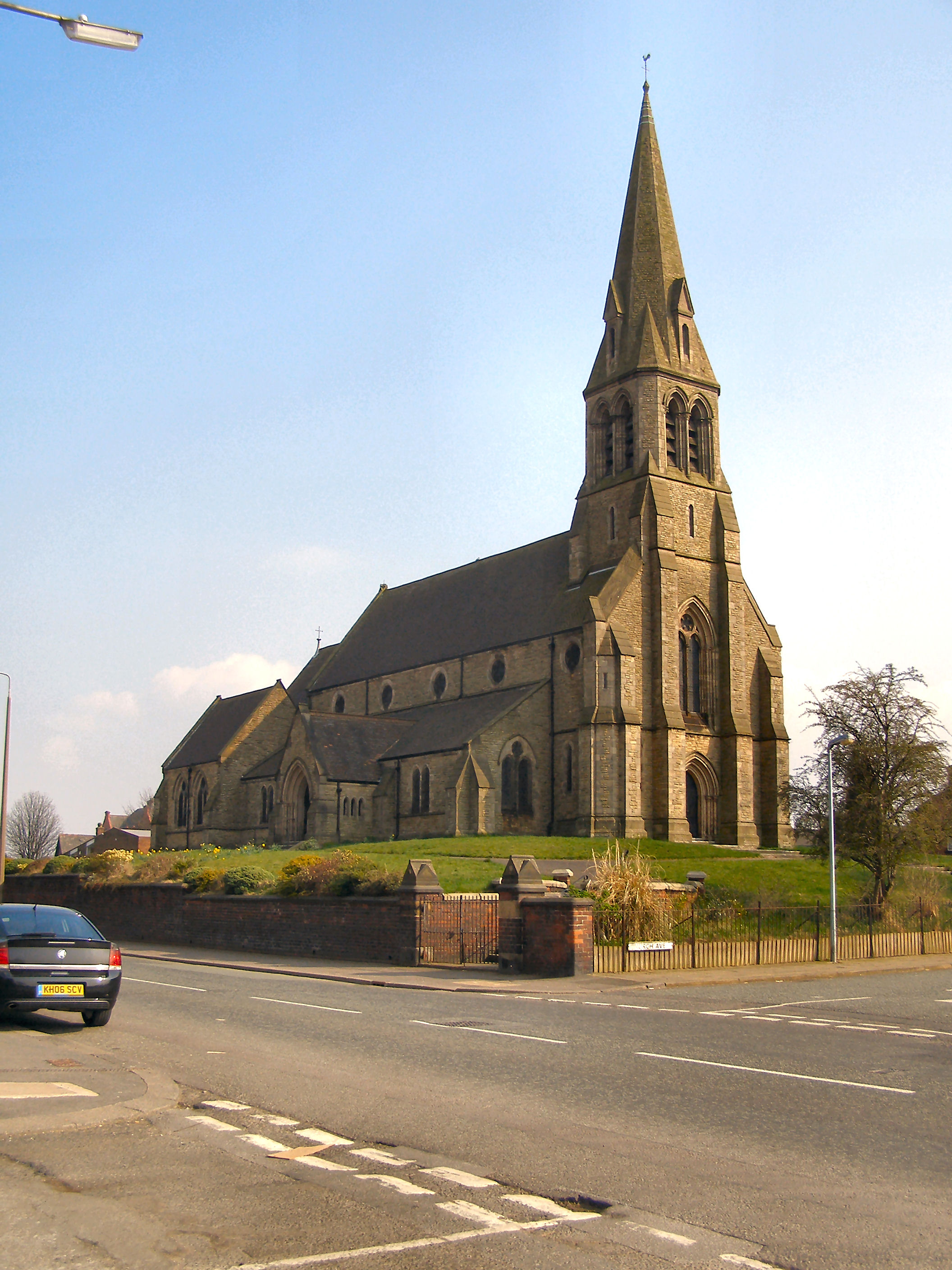
St Luke's Church, Weaste

St Luke's Church is a Grade II* listed building designed by George Gilbert Scott where Emily Pankhurst, the women's suffragette leader, was married.

Between 1901 and 2011, Salford Red Devils Rugby League club played their homes games at the Willows off Weaste Lane. In 2012 the club moved to the Salford City Stadium in Barton-upon-Irwell.

Weaste Cemetery was opened in 1857 as Salford's first public municipal cemetery and as of February 2025 remains one of four cemeteries in Salford. Musical conductor Sir Charles Hallé, 19th-century lifesaver Mark Addy, Eddie Colman—one of the Manchester United Busby Babes who died in the Munich air disaster—and Ferdinand Stanley, who rode in the Charge of the Light Brigade, are all buried in Weaste Cemetery.

== Transport ==
Weaste tram stop serves the area as part of the Manchester Metrolink tram system. It is on the Eccles line.

Weaste is not served by a train station since the closure of Weaste railway station in the 1940s.

The A57 (Eccles New Road) passes through Weaste, which lies close to the M602 motorway.

== Notable residents ==
Albert Finney, the BAFTA award-winning actor famous for films such as Tom Jones and Murder on the Orient Express grew up in Weaste on Gore Crescent. Mary Fauriel Lockett, pharmacologist, radiologist and missionary, was born in Weaste.

== See also ==
- Seedley
- Pendleton, Greater Manchester
- Eccles, Greater Manchester
- Listed buildings in Salford, Greater Manchester
