= Mary Fauriel Lockett =

English-born Australian pharmacologist (1911–1982)

Mary Fauriel Lockett FRCP FRACP
- Born: 17 March 1911; Weaste, Salford, Manchester, England
- Died: 5 January 1982 (aged 70); Nedlands, Perth, Western Australia, Australia
- Education: Cheltenham Ladies' College
- Alma mater: London School of Medicine for Women (BSc, MB); University of London (MD); Newnham College, Cambridge (PhD)
- Employer(s): Chelsea College of Science and Technology; Church Mission Society; University of Glasgow; University of Birmingham; University of Western Australia; Commonwealth Scientific and Industrial Research Organization (CSIRO)
- Organization: Royal College of Physicians

Mary Fauriel Lockett (17 March 1911 – 5 January 1982) was an English-born Australian pharmacologist, radiologist, missionary and educator. She was Head of the Department of Physiology and Pharmacology at Chelsea College of Science and Technology (1951–1962), taught at other British universities, and was the first female professor at the University of Western Australia. She identified a previously unknown steroid in cholesterol associated with cardiovascular disease.

== Biography ==
Lockett was born on 17 March 1911 in Weaste, Salford, Manchester, England. Her parents were vicar of Holy Innocents Church, Fallowfield, Harry Duncan Lockett and his wife Mary Lockett (née Hicks).

Lockett was educated at Cheltenham Ladies’ College in Cheltenham, Gloucestershire, then studied a bachelor's degrees in medicine and science and a doctorate in medicine at the London School of Medicine for Women and the University of London. After graduating as a Doctor of Medicine (MD) in 1936, she was admitted as a member of the Royal College of Physicians (RCP) in 1937.

From 1937, Lockett worked as a pathologist and radiologist for the Anglican Church Missionary Society (CMS) in Old Cairo, Egypt. She returned to England in 1940, suffering from dengue fever, amoebic dysentery and hypoplastic anaemia.

Lockett was awarded a Beit Memorial Fellowship for Medical Research, which enabled her to study a PhD in pharmacology at Newnham College, Cambridge, from 1944 to 1946. Her thesis was an account of two bases which were obtained from urine and which, when injected intravenously, raised the blood pressure of cats. Following her PhD, Lockett lectured at the University of Glasgow in Scotland. From 1951 to 1962, Lockett was Head of the Department of Physiology and Pharmacology at Chelsea College of Science and Technology in London. From 1962 to 1963 she was a research fellow at the University of Birmingham.

In 1963, Lockett emigrated to Australia and was appointed the Wellcome Foundation research professor of pharmacology at the University of Western Australia, becoming the first female professor at the institution. She secured funding from the National Health and Medical Research Council of Australia and the National Heart Foundation of Australia to study cardiology, nephrology, endocrinology and physiology. Her research included studies on diuretics and the role of the kidney in causing dropsy in heart disease. She identified a previously unknown steroid in cholesterol associated with cardiovascular disease. She collaborated with colleagues in the Commonwealth Scientific and Industrial Research Organization (CSIRO).

Lockett was elected a Fellow of the Royal Australian College of Physicians in 1973, but retired later that year due to ill health. She died on 5 January 1982 in Nedlands, Perth, Western Australia, Australia, aged 70.

Archives related to Lockett are held at the archives of the University of Western Australia.
