= Mark Addy (oarsman) =

Recipient of the Albert Medal

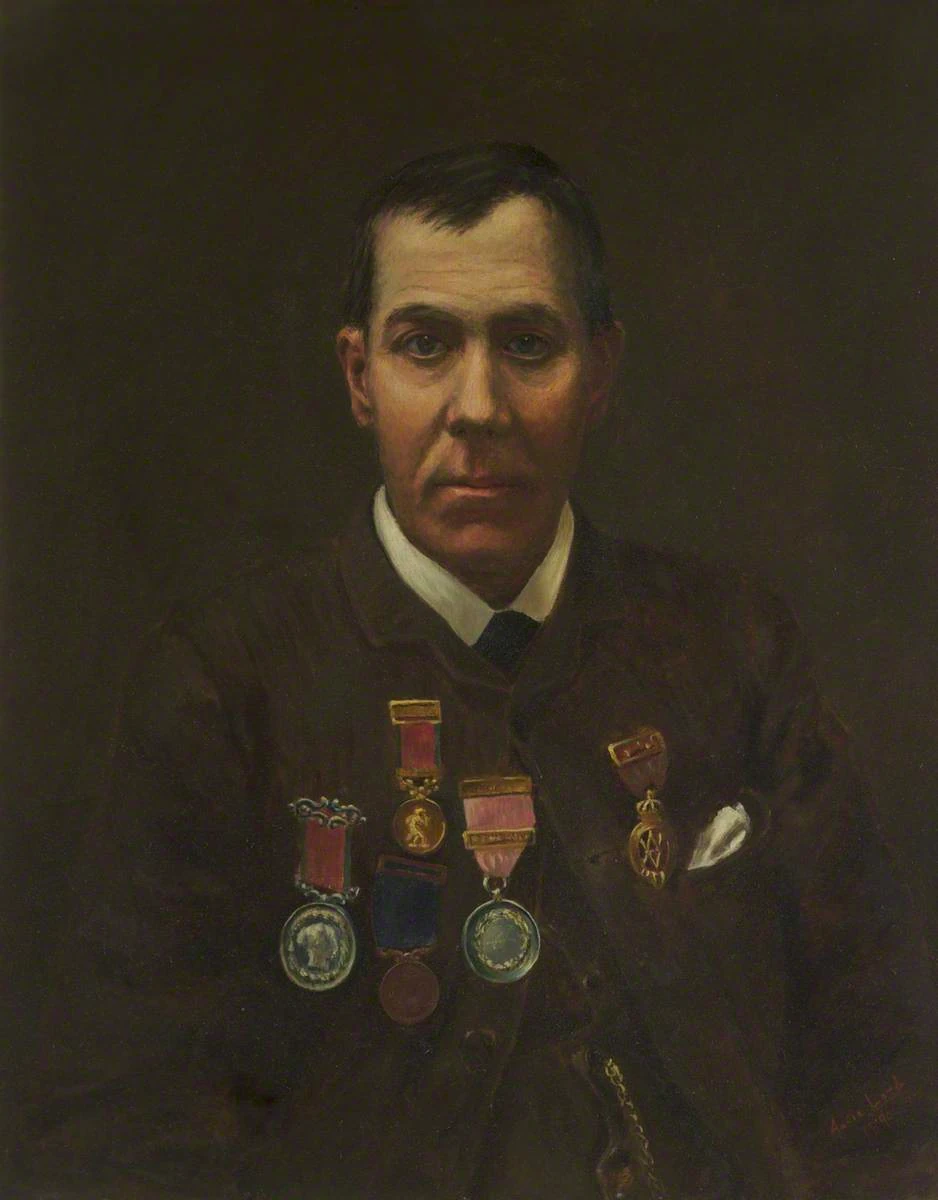
- Born: c. 1840; Manchester, Lancashire, England
- Died: 9 June 1890; Lancashire, England
- Resting place: Weaste Cemetery, Weaste, Salford, Lancashire, England
- Known for: Saving people from the River Irwell
- Spouse: Jane Laverock (m. 1860)
- Children: 4

Mark Anthony Addy AM (c. 1840 – 9 June 1890) was a publican and champion oarsman, from Manchester, England, who was awarded the Albert Medal (AM), and a number of other honours, for the rescue of over 50 people from the then highly-polluted River Irwell in the 19th century. The Albert Medal was later superseded by the George Cross as the highest civilian or non-combat gallantry award in the British honours system.

== Early life ==
Mark Addy was born around 1840 at 2 Stage Buildings, The Parsonage, an Italianate-style tenement on the banks of the River Irwell near Blackfriars Bridge in Manchester, Lancashire. His father was a boatman, who was born in County Clare, Ireland named Mark Antoni Addy (1801–1865), while his mother was from Suffolk named Elizabeth Brown. Addy was one of the younger children; he was his parents' eighth child. The others being Henry, Joseph (who died as a child), Richard, Julia, Mary, Catharine, and Joseph. Addy assisted his father with the family boat-hire business on the river. At the age of 13, Addy rescued one of his friends, John Booth, who had fallen into the Irwell, which ran along the side of his house. Although Addy was himself unable to swim he effected the rescue by wading out up to his chin and pulled the boy ashore. The same boy was rescued by Addy some time later, when he fell into a pool of deep water, but this time Addy floated out on a plank to rescue him.

== Later life ==
In his teens, Addy learned to swim at Greengate Public Baths in Salford, and over the next few years became an expert swimmer. He also became a proficient oarsman and, in addition to various successes at local regattas, he beat David Coombes (son of champion sculler, Robert Coombes) in the Thames Championship for £200, and Ted May (author of Ted May's Useful Little Book) over the same course for £100. He was the head of the famous "Colleen Bawn" crew, who were so named when the proprietor of Queen's Theatre in Manchester gave a prize, on condition that the winning crew became known by the name of his latest theatre production. After marrying Jane Laverock in 1860, Addy moved across the river to Ordsall in Salford and became the landlord of the Old Boathouse Inn in Everard Street off Ordsall Lane, due to its close proximity to the river. They had four children, Mary Jane (1861–1940), Joseph Henry (1863–1888), Elizabeth (1865–1911), and Ada (1871–1929) and for a brief period of time, he took in his brother's son, Mark Anthony (1856–1899). He continued to carry out a series of rescues. Although in Addy's youth the river was relatively clean, as the Industrial Revolution progressed it became more polluted, and when the Suez Canal was opened in 1869, the Irwell was jokingly renamed the "Sewage Canal". However, the increasingly poisonous condition of the river did not deter him from plunging in at a moment's notice:

On one occasion Addy was returning from a funeral in a new black suit, with a valuable gold watch in his pocket, when the cry went up "a child is in the river!" Mark rushed to the spot and "without divesting himself of a single garment" plunged in and rescued the child. As he stood dripping, before the crowd of excited onlookers, one said "Mark, tha has spoiled tha clothes." "What of that" came the answer "I reckon it will also have made a mess of my watch, but it does not matter, there was a life in the job at stake."

In 1872 or 1873, a drunken and mentally unstable woman threw herself in the river in an attempt at suicide. Due to her struggles to fight him off, Addy was almost drowned himself, but despite the cries of onlookers to leave her and save himself, he subdued her and brought her ashore.

On another occasion Addy was roused from his sleep by a boatman who informed him that a woman was drowning in the river. Rushing out in his night-clothes, he rowed out to the woman but was unable to get her into the boat as she weighed over 17 stones (238 lbs./108 kg), so, holding her head out of the water with one hand, he rowed the boat to the bank with the other.

== Awards and honours ==
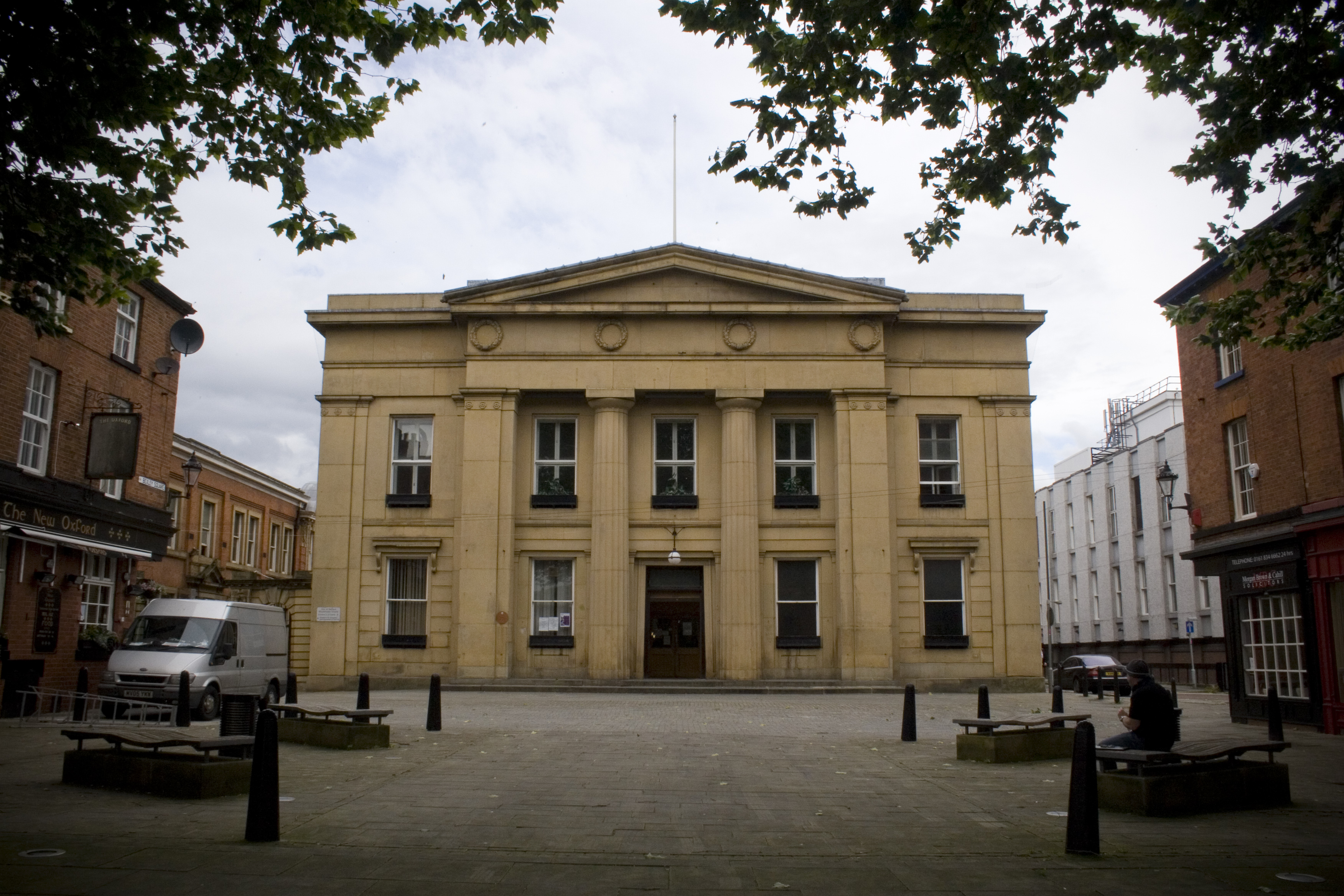
Salford Town Hall

In January 1878, before a large crowd of people at Salford Town Hall in Bexley Square, Addy was presented with a loyal address of appreciation by the Mayor of Salford and awarded with a purse of 200 guineas for his heroic deeds, by the people of Salford. Immediately after the ceremony Mr. James Smith, a member of the Humane Society for the Hundred of Salford presented an address and the Gold Medal of the Society to which the members of the nearby Nemesis Rowing Club added a gold clasp as a token of their appreciation. He was awarded a number of other medals including the Silver Medal of the Humane Society for the Hundred of Salford and the Bronze Medal of the Royal Humane Society.

In November 1878, Addy received the following letter from the Prime Minister Benjamin Disraeli:

10 Downing Street,

Whitehall,
6th November, 1878

Sir,

The attention of the Sovereign having been called to the repeated acts of heroism performed by you in saving, at the risk of your own life, those of many of her majesty's subjects from drowning in the River Irwell, I have the gratification to inform you that the Queen has been graciously pleased to confer on you, in recognition of your gallantry and daring, the honour and distinction of the Albert Medal of the first class. I have accordingly instructed the Secretary of State to take the necessary steps to give effect to her majesty's commands.

I have the honour to be your obedient servant,—

BEACONSFIELD

Formal notice of the award appeared in the London Gazette of 17 December 1878:

Whitehall, December 13, 1878.

THE Queen has been graciously pleased to confer the "Albert Medal of the First Class" on—

MARK ADDY, of Salford.

Statement of the case of MARK ADDY, to whom the Albert Medal of the First Class has been granted in recognition of his repeated acts of heroism in saving life from drowning in the River Irwell.

MARK ADDY, a well-known oarsman and sculler, has resided all his life on the banks of the polluted River Irwell; his father and brothers having followed the trade of Boat Builders.

During a period of about twenty-five years, he has, under circumstances of imminent peril, both from the violence of the river and the pestilential nature of its waters, saved no fewer than six-and-thirty lives, several of the cases having occurred subsequently to the date of the creation of the said Order.

For his heroic efforts and conspicuous gallantry, he has, at various times, received the following distinctions :—

The Bronze Medal of the Royal Humane Society.
The Silver Medal of the Salford Humane Society.
The Gold Medal of the Salford Humane Society.
An illuminated Address setting forth his Badges of Honour from the Salford Humane Society.

A purse of 200 guineas and an illuminated Address from the inhabitants of Salford.

He was presented with the Albert Medal, First Class, by the Mayor of Salford, Alderman Robinson, on behalf of Queen Victoria in the large assembly room of Salford Town Hall in Bexley Square in June 1879.

The medals awarded to Addy, now kept in the Salford Museum and Art Gallery (Peel Park Art Gallery), are as follows:

- Albert Medal, first class having the 1.373 inch crimson ribbon with four white stripes, with the following inscription on the back "Presented in the name of Her Majesty to Mark Addy of Salford for gallantry in saving six and thirty lives in the River Irwell"
- Royal Humane Society Bronze Medal for a successful rescue, with a blue ribbon, engraved on the edge "Mark Addy, December 1878"
- Hundred of Salford Humane Society Silver Medal engraved "for saving the life of Mary Barrett, 24th June 1872" with a pink ribbon with green edges and a gold bar of the "Nemesis Rowing Club"
- Hundred of Salford Humane Society Gold Medal with a pink ribbon with green edges and a gold bar engraved "Memorial Committee"
- Manchester and Salford Swimmers Silver Medal and Clasp with a blue ribbon

== Death ==
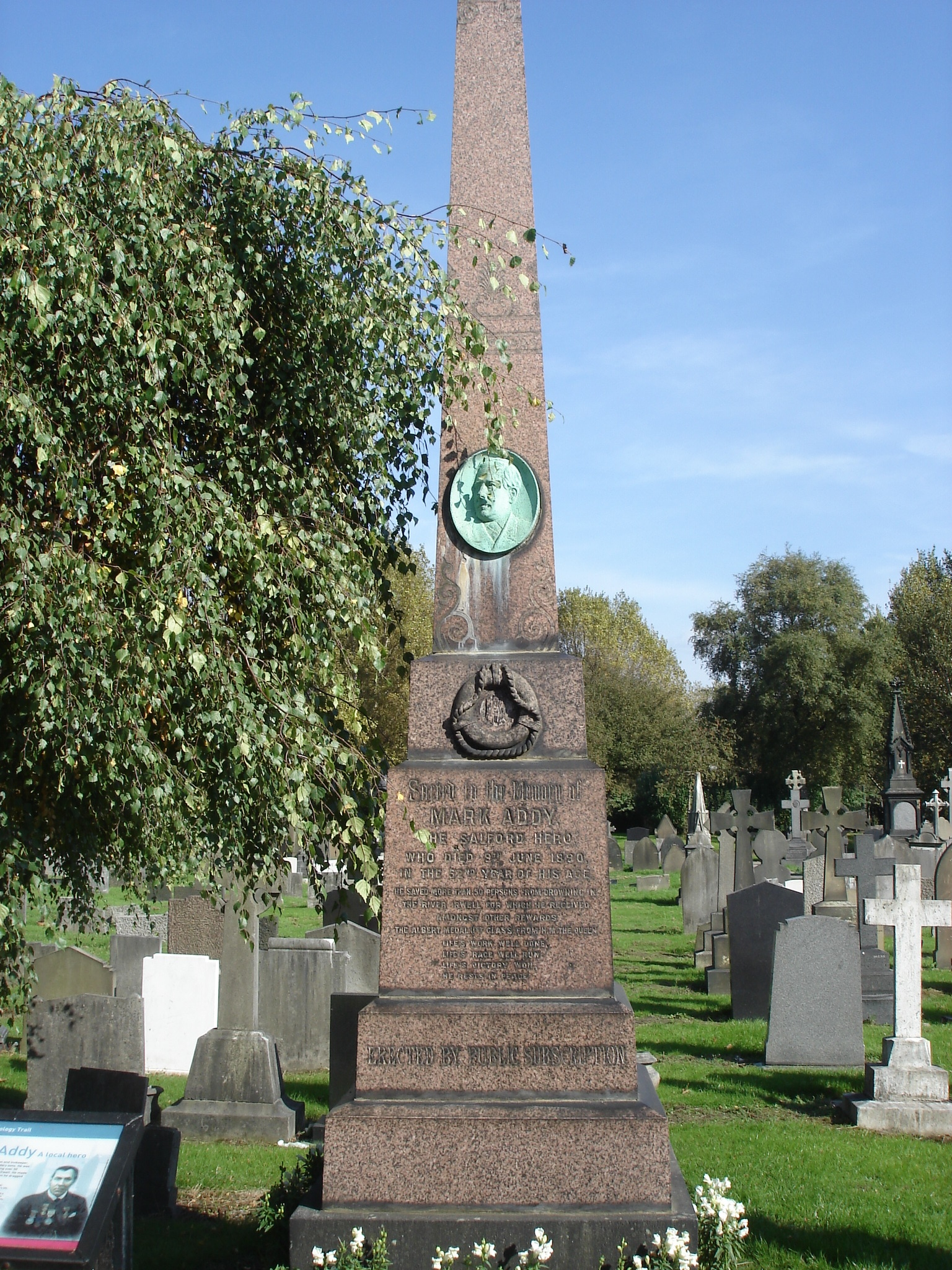
Mark Addy funerary monument, Weaste Cemetery

On Whit Monday, 1889 Addy was watching a procession of children, when he heard a cry that a boy had fallen in the river at the bottom of Factory Lane. He made his way to the place and jumped into a particularly sewage-laden stretch of water to save the boy. Although the rescue was successful, according to an 1890 obituary, "he laid the foundation of an illness that day which eventually gained the mastery of his powerful, well-knit frame" and he died of "consumption" (tuberculosis) on 9 June 1890 Some time before his death, Addy said:

Yes, it is true I have saved many lives, but the best work I ever did was saving that little lad on Whit Monday. I think more about that than all the rest. To see the joy of his brother and sister when I brought him out, to feel their grip around my legs, and to hear them thank me a hundred times, was more to me than all else besides; it was better than the big meeting, and the purse of gold given at the Town Hall

According to the National Probate Calendar, Addy left an estate valued at £819, 14s, 3d; a significant sum of money for a working class man at that time and equivalent to around £50,000 in modern terms.

== Memorials ==
Not long after his death it was decided that a memorial should be erected and, in May 1891, 1,000 people attended the unveiling of the monument in Weaste Cemetery, Weaste, Salford where he was buried. The monument consisted of a polished red granite obelisk rising from a stepped base. On the front was inscribed:

Sacred to the memory of Mark Addy, the Salford hero who died 9 June 1890 in the 52nd year of his age. He saved more than 50 persons from drowning in the River Irwell, for which he received amongst other rewards, the Albert Medal (1st class) from H.M. the Queen. Life's work well done, life's races well won. He rests in peace. Erected by public subscription.

Above the inscription was a carved lifebuoy and rope entwining his initials and, above that, an oval bronze plaque inscribed with the portrait head of Addy. On the base was another bronze plaque depicting incidents from his life. The monument still stands today and is a Grade II listed structure, although it is in poor condition, with one of the bronze plaques missing.

Because of the large number of subscriptions to the memorial fund a life-size oil portrait of him wearing his medals was commissioned and donated to the Peel Park Picture Gallery, now the Salford Museum and Art Gallery, and a swimming trophy for Salford boys to be presented at Regent Road Baths, the Mark Addy Silver Cup, was instigated.

Addy has also been commemorated in a number of other forms: At Woden Street, between Pomona Docks and Regent Road, close to the former location of the Boathouse Inn, is a bridge known locally as the "Mark Addy Footbridge". On the Salford bank of the River Irwell, on the site of the former New Bailey landing stage and the Nemesis Rowing Club, below Stanley Street, is a riverside public house named "The Mark Addy", built in 1981 and re-opened in 2009. However, the pub was badly damaged by Storm Eva in December 2015 and is unlikely to open again.
