= Salford Town Hall =

Municipal building in Salford, Greater Manchester, England

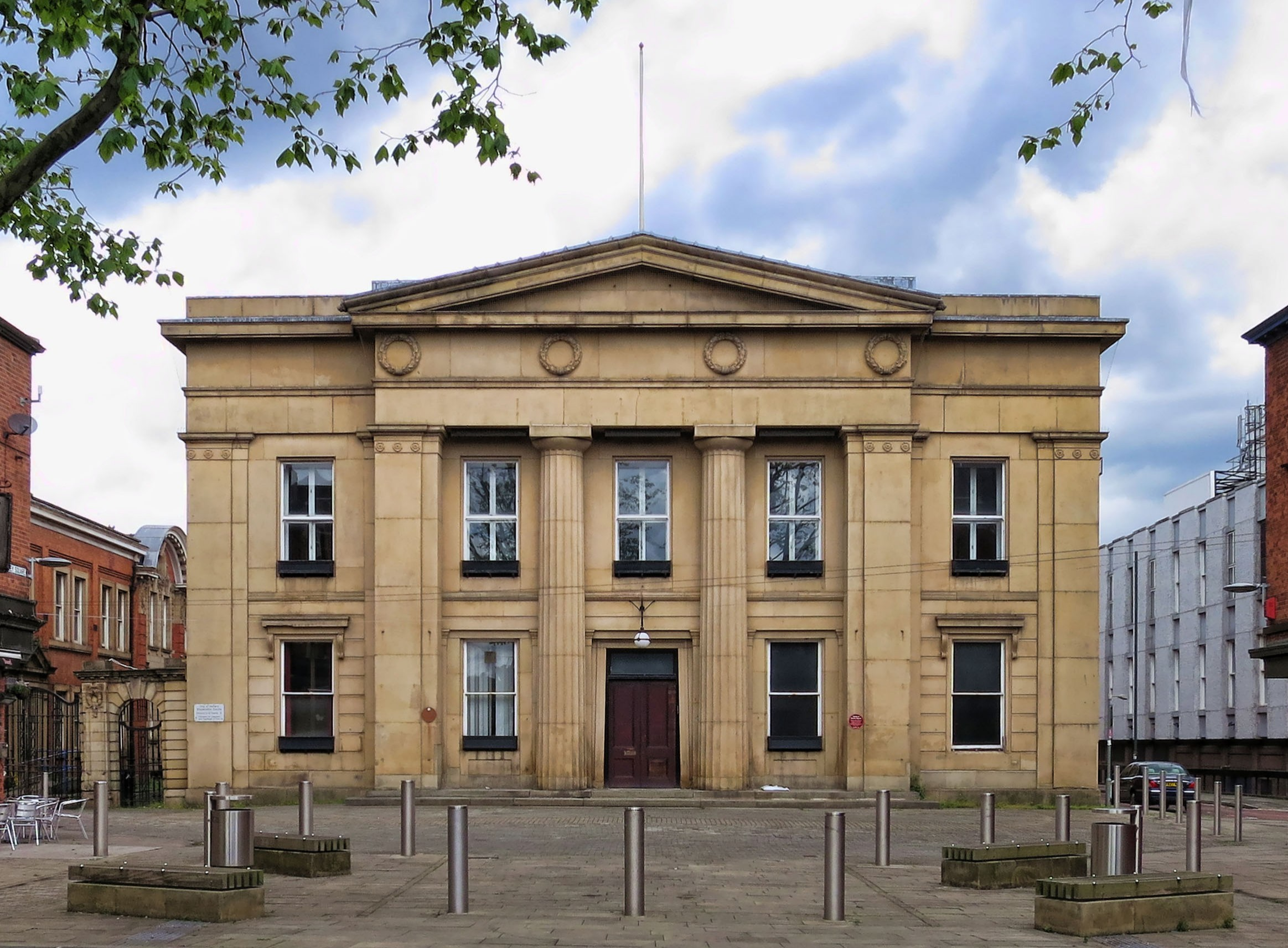
- Salford Town Hall

- Shown in Greater Manchester
- 53.4838°N 2.259°W
- Location: Salford

History
- Built: 1827

Site notes
- Architect: Richard Lane
- Architectural style: Neo-classical style

Listed Building – Grade II
- Designated: 31 January 1952
- Reference no.: 1386076

Salford Town Hall is the former town hall of Salford, Greater Manchester, England. It was the meeting place of the County Borough of Salford. Following the abolition of the county borough, it became Salford Magistrates' Court and continued to be used as such until 2011. The court was then merged with the court of Manchester to form the Manchester and Salford Magistrates' Court. The building is now in residential use and is a Grade II Listed Building being designated in January 1952.

== History ==
The foundation stone for the town hall was laid by Lord Bexley, Chancellor of the Duchy of Lancaster in August 1825. The square in which the building now stands was named after him. It was designed by Richard Lane in the Neo-classical style and completed in 1827. The building, which was originally constructed as a market hall, became the Salford's town hall in 1835 and, additionally, a courthouse in 1840. The building was expanded three times in the nineteenth century.

In January 1878 it was the place where local hero Mark Addy received several awards for his gallantry in saving people from drowning in the River Irwell. On 1 October 1931 it was the scene of the 'Battle of Bexley Square' where 10,000 protesters of the Salford Branch of the National Unemployed Workers' Movement clashed with police, an event which is commemorated with a plaque on the building. The novelist Walter Greenwood was present at the demonstration and a similar event is portrayed in his novel "Love on the Dole".

The building became the headquarters of the County Borough of Salford and continued to be called Salford Town Hall, notwithstanding that Salford was granted city status in 1926. It ceased to be the local seat of government when the county borough was abolished by the Local Government Act 1972 and Swinton and Pendlebury Town Hall became the meeting place for the enlarged local authority area, known as the City of Salford, in 1974.

Salford Town Hall was used as a court house until the last two court rooms closed in December 2011. It was subsequently sold to private developers, who completed converting the building into apartments in November 2015.

== Architecture ==
The building was the first architectural project by Richard Lane. Lane went on to design several further prominent buildings in what is now Greater Manchester, including the Friends Meeting House in Chorlton-on-Medlock and Chorlton Town Hall, both of which have similar designs to Salford Town Hall. The building is constructed in the Neo-classical style, with a minimalist entablature of the Doric Order. Only the front of the building is faced with stone; the sides are red brick.

== See also ==
- Salford Civic Centre
- Listed buildings in Salford, Greater Manchester
