= Salford =

City in Greater Manchester, England

- City
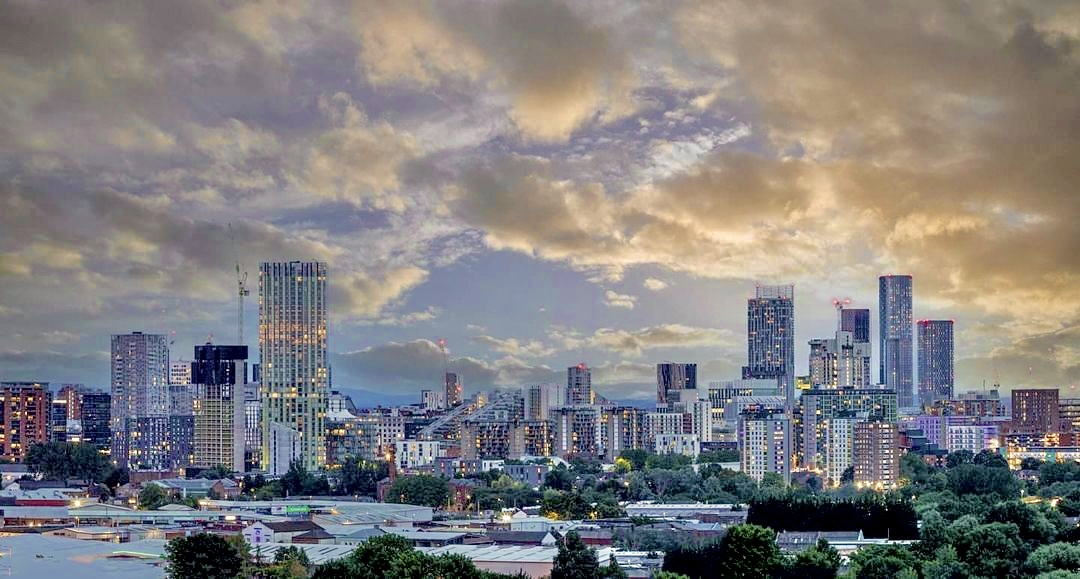
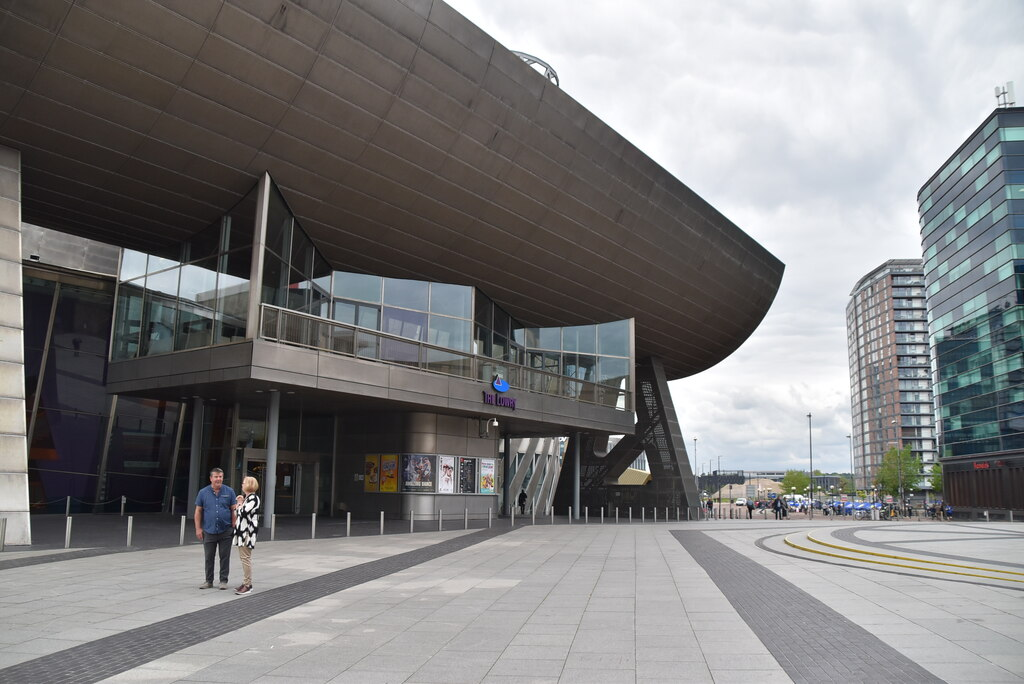
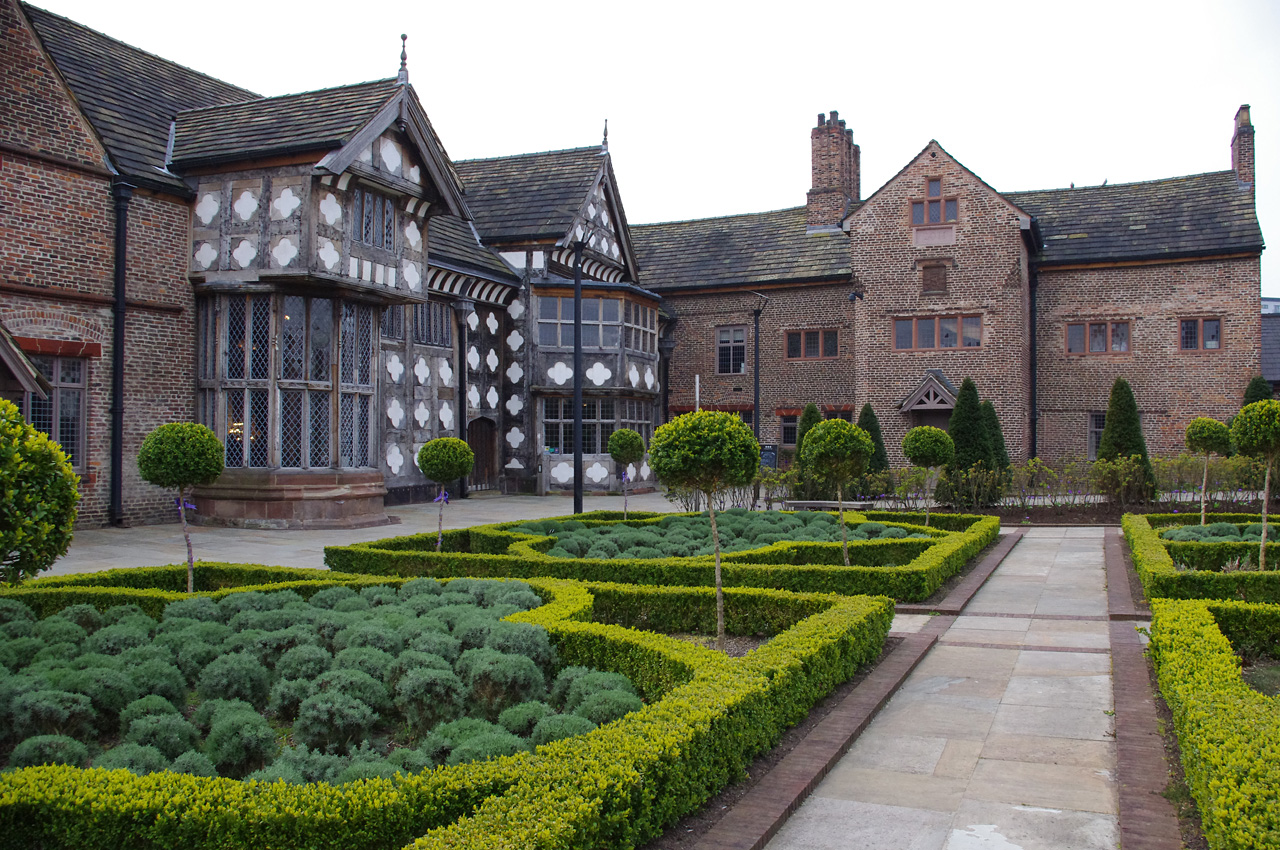
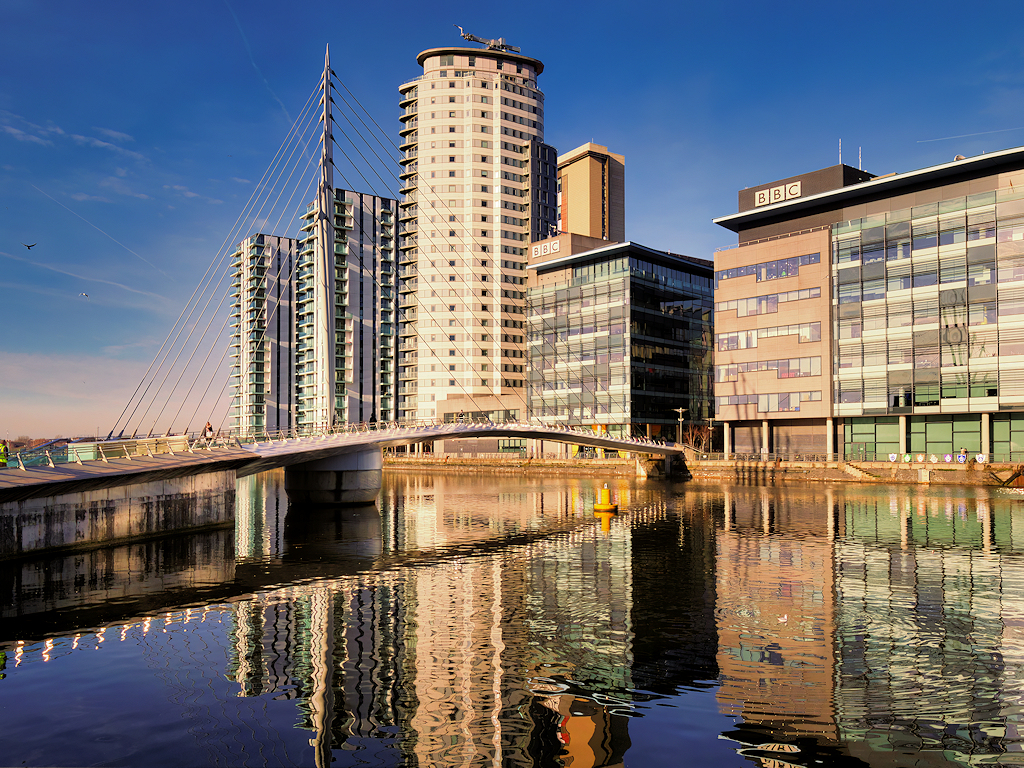
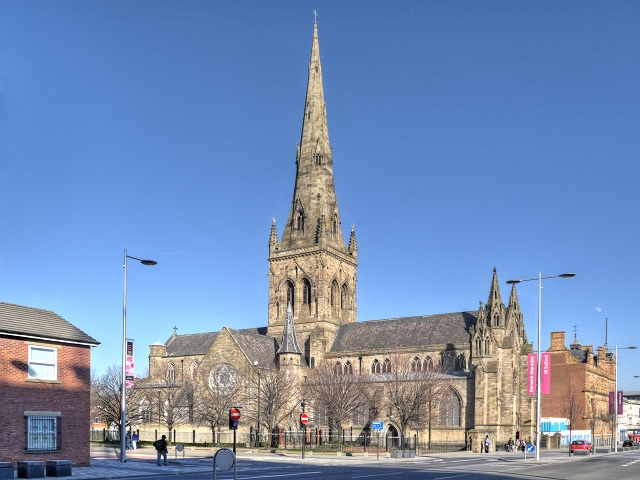
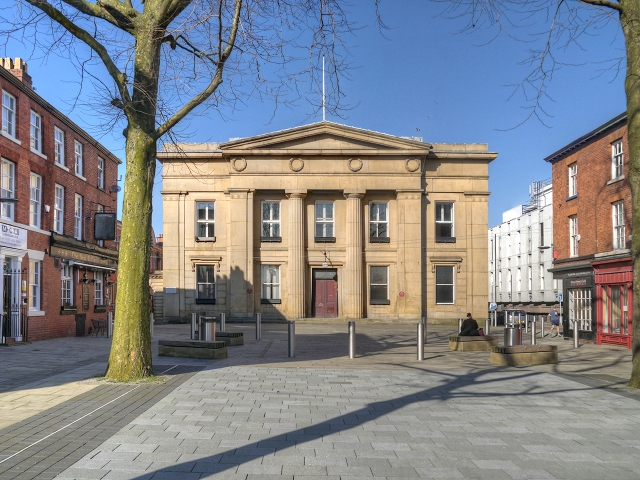
- Skyline of Salford and Manchester The Lowry Ordsall Hall MediaCityUK Cathedral Town Hall

- Location within Greater Manchester
- Area: 8.1 sq mi (21 km^{2})
- Population: 129,794 (2021 census)
  - Density: 8,981/sq mi (3,468/km^{2})
- Demonym: Salfordian
- OS grid reference: SJ805985
  - London: 164 mi (264 km) SE
- Metropolitan borough: Salford
- Metropolitan county: Greater Manchester
- Region: North West
- Country: England
- Sovereign state: United Kingdom
- City areas in the 2011 UK census: List: Broughton; Greengate; Irlams o' th' Height; Kersal; Ordsall; Pendleton; Salford Quays; Seedley; Weaste
- Post town: Salford
- Postcode district: M3, M5–M7, M50
- Dialling code: 0161
- Police: Greater Manchester
- Fire: Greater Manchester
- Ambulance: North West
- UK Parliament: Salford

Salford (/ˈsɒlfərd/ SOL-fərd) is a city in Greater Manchester, England, on the western bank of the River Irwell which forms its boundary with Manchester city centre. Landmarks include the former town hall, Salford Cathedral, Salford Lads' Club and St Philip's Church. In 2021 it had a population of 129,794. The demonym for people from Salford is Salfordian.

Salford is the main settlement of the wider City of Salford metropolitan borough, which incorporates Eccles, Pendlebury, Swinton and Walkden.

Salford was named in the Early Middle Ages, though evidence exists of settlement since Neolithic times. It was the seat of the large Hundred of Salford in the historic county of Lancashire and was granted a market charter in about 1230, which gave it primary cultural and commercial importance in the region. It was eventually overtaken by Manchester during the Industrial Revolution. The former County Borough of Salford was granted city status in 1926; the current wider borough was established in 1974.

The economy of the city in the 18th and 19th centuries was focused on a major factory district for cotton and silk spinning and weaving, and as a major inland port after the opening of Salford Docks in 1894. Industrial decline in the 20th century led to the city having run-down and antisocial areas. Salford has been subject to slum clearances and other regeneration programmes since the 1930s. From 2007, multiple media companies set up headquarters at the MediaCityUK development in Salford Quays, an area established in the 1980s on former dockland. Organisations in the city include the University of Salford, Salford City Football Club, Salford Red Devils, BBC North and ITV Granada.

== History ==
=== Toponymy ===
The name of Salford derives from Old English: Sealhford, meaning a ford by the willows (also known as sallows), in reference to the trees growing on the banks of the River Irwell. The ford was about where Victoria Bridge is today. Willow trees are still found in Lower Broughton. Salford appears in the pipe roll of 1169 as "Sauford" and in the Lancashire Inquisitions of 1226 as "Sainford".

=== Early history ===
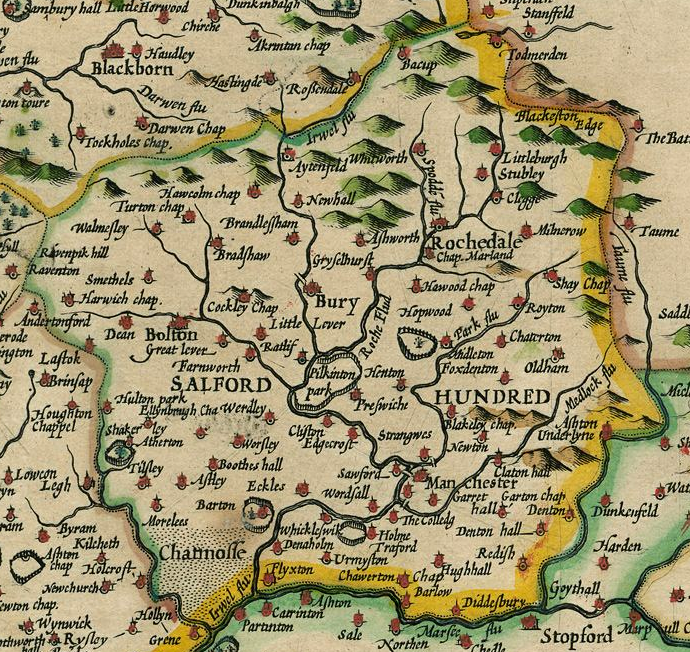
The Hundred of Salford was a Royal Manor of Anglo-Saxon origin centred on the demesne of Salford.

The earliest known evidence of human activity in what is now Salford is provided by the Neolithic flint arrow-heads and workings discovered on Kersal Moor and the River Irwell, suggesting that the area was inhabited 7–10,000 years ago. The raw material for such tools was scarce and unsuitable for working, and as a result they are not of the quality found elsewhere. Other finds include a Neolithic axe-hammer found near Mode Wheel, during the excavation of the Manchester Ship Canal in 1890, and a Bronze Age cremation urn during the construction of a road on the Broughton Hall estate in 1873.

The Brigantes were the major Celtic tribe in what is now Northern England. With a stronghold at the sandstone outcrop on which Manchester Cathedral now stands, opposite Salford's original centre, their territory extended across the fertile lowland by the River Irwell that is now Salford and Stretford. Following the Roman conquest of Britain, General Agricola ordered the construction of a Roman fort named Mamucium (Manchester) to protect the routes to Deva Victrix (Chester) and Eboracum (York) from the Brigantes. Salford was founded when the fort was completed in AD 79, and for over 300 years the Pax Romana brought peace to the area. Both the main Roman road to the north, from Mamucium to Ribchester, and a second road to the west, ran through what is now Salford, but few Roman artefacts have been found in the area. The withdrawal of the Romans in AD 410 left the inhabitants at the mercy of the Saxons. The Danes later conquered the area and absorbed what was left of the Brigantes.

=== Middle Ages ===
Angles settled in the region during the Early Middle Ages and gave the locality the name Sealhford, meaning "ford by the willows". According to the Anglo-Saxon Chronicle, Sealhford was part of the Kingdom of Northumbria until it was conquered in 923 by Edward the Elder.

Following the emergence of the united Kingdom of England, Salford became a caput baroniae or central manor within a broad rural area in part held by the Kings of England, including Edward the Confessor. The area between the rivers Mersey and Ribble was divided into six smaller districts, referred to as "wapentakes", or hundreds. The south east district became known as the Hundred of Salford, a division of land administered from Salford for military and judicial purposes. It contained nine large parishes, smaller parts of two others, and the township of Aspull in the parish of Wigan.

After the defeat of Harold II during the Norman conquest of England, William I granted the Hundred of Salford to Roger the Poitevin, and in the Domesday Book of 1086 the Hundred of Salford was recorded as covering an area of 350 square miles (906 km^{2}) with a population of 35,000. Poitevin created the subordinate Manor of Manchester out of the hundred, which has since in local government been separate from Salford. Poitevin forfeited the manor in 1102 when he was defeated in a failed rebellion attempt against Henry I. In around 1115, for their support during the rebellion, Henry I placed the Hundred of Salford under the control of the Earldom of Lancaster, and it is from this exchange that the Hundred of Salford became a royal manor. The lord of the manor was either the English monarch, or a feudal land owner who administered the manor for the king. During the reign of Henry II the royal manor of Salford passed to Ranulf de Gernon, 4th Earl of Chester.

Salford began to emerge as a small town early in the 13th century. In 1228, Henry III granted the caput of Salford the right to hold a market and an annual fair. The fairs were important to the town; a 17th-century order forced each burgess – a freeman of the borough – to attend, but the fairs were abolished during the 19th century. The Earls of Chester aided the development of the caput, and in 1230 Ranulf de Blondeville, 6th Earl of Chester made Salford a burgage, or free borough. The charter gave its burgesses certain commercial rights, privileges and advantages over traders living outside Salford; one of the 26 clauses of the charter stated that no one could work in the hundred of Salford unless they also lived in the borough. Salford's status as a burgage encouraged an influx of distinguished families, and by the Late Middle Ages Salford was "rich in its manor houses", with over 30 within a 5-mile (8 km) radius of Ordsall. These included Ordsall Hall (owned by the Radclyffe family) and Broughton Hall, owned by the Earls of Derby.

=== Early Modern period ===
During the Civil War of 1640–1649, Salford supported the Royalist cause, in contrast to Manchester just across the Irwell which declared in favour of the Parliamentarians. Royalist forces mounted a siege of Manchester across what is now the site of Victoria Bridge, which although short-lived, "did little to improve relations between the two towns". A century later, in 1745, Salford was staunchly in support of Bonnie Prince Charlie, in his attempt to seize the Throne of England. He entered the town at the head of his army and was blessed by the Reverend John Clayton before leaving "in high spirits" to march on London; he returned to Salford in defeat just nine days later.

Salford has a history of textile processing that pre-dates the Industrial Revolution, and as an old town had been developing for about 700 years. Before the introduction of cotton there was a considerable trade in woollen goods and fustians. Other cottage industries prevalent at this time included clogging, cobbling, weaving and brewing. The changes to textile manufacture during the Industrial Revolution had a profound effect on both on population and urbanisation, as well as the socioeconomic and cultural conditions of Salford.

=== Industrial Revolution ===
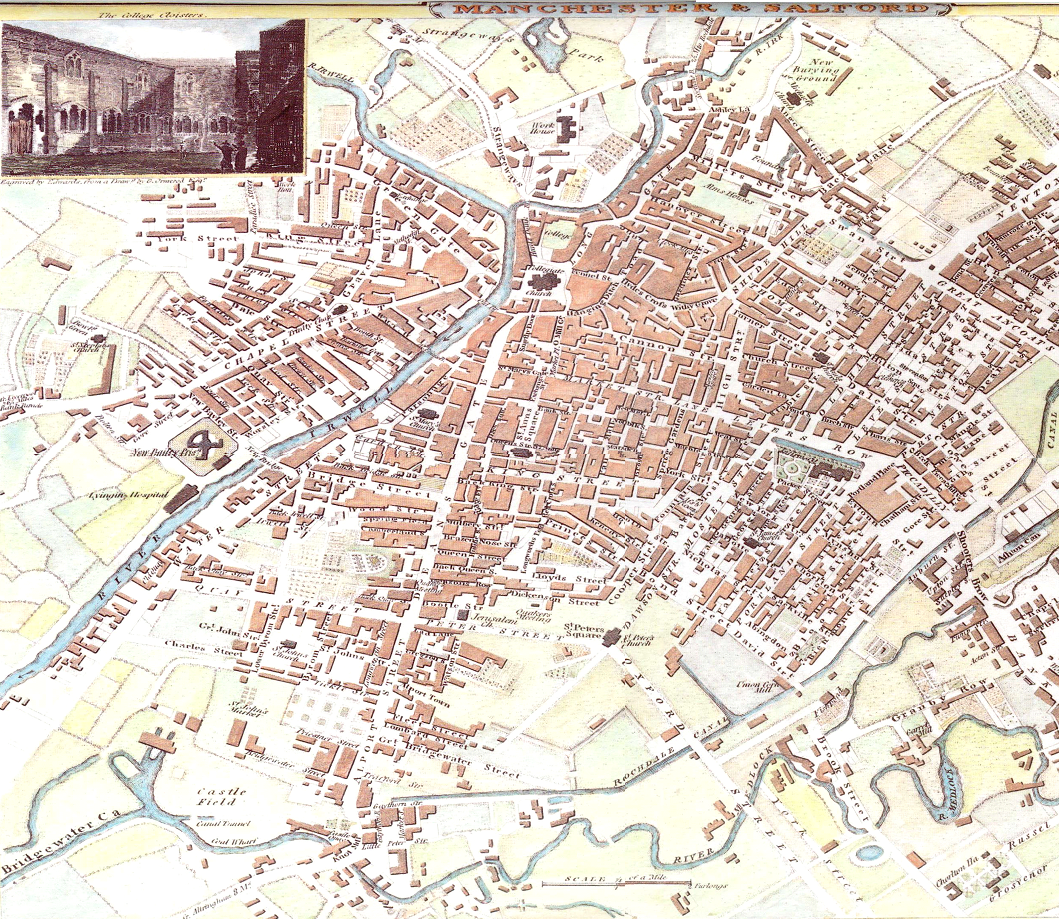
A map of Manchester and Salford in 1801

The well-established textile processing and trading infrastructure, and the ready supply of water from the River Irwell and its tributaries, attracted entrepreneurs who built cotton mills along the banks of the river in Pendleton and Ordsall. Although Salford followed a similar pattern of industrial development to Manchester, most businesses preferred to build their premises on the Manchester side of the Irwell, and consequently Salford did not develop as a commercial centre in the same way as its neighbour. Many of these earlier mills had been based on Arkwright-type designs. These relied on strong falls of water, but Salford is on a meander of the Irwell with only a slight gradient and thus mills tended to be built upstream, at Kersal and Pendleton. However, with the introduction of the steam engine in the late 18th century, merchants began to construct mills closer to the centres of Salford and Manchester, where supplies of labour and coal were more readily available (the first steam-powered mill was built in Manchester in 1780). One of the first factories to be built was Philip's and Lee's Twist Mill in Salford, completed in 1801, the second iron-framed multi-story building to be erected in Britain. The large Salford Engine Twist Company mill was built to the west of Salford, between Chapel Street and the Irwell, and in 1806 was the first large cotton mill to use gas lighting. Many engineering companies were established in this area, including Samuel Ellis and Company at the Irwell Foundry. However, it was outnumbered by the numerous smaller factories and mills throughout the area, including Nathan Gough's steam-driven mule spinning mill, near Oldfield Road, where a serious accident occurred on 13 October 1824 (see illustration).

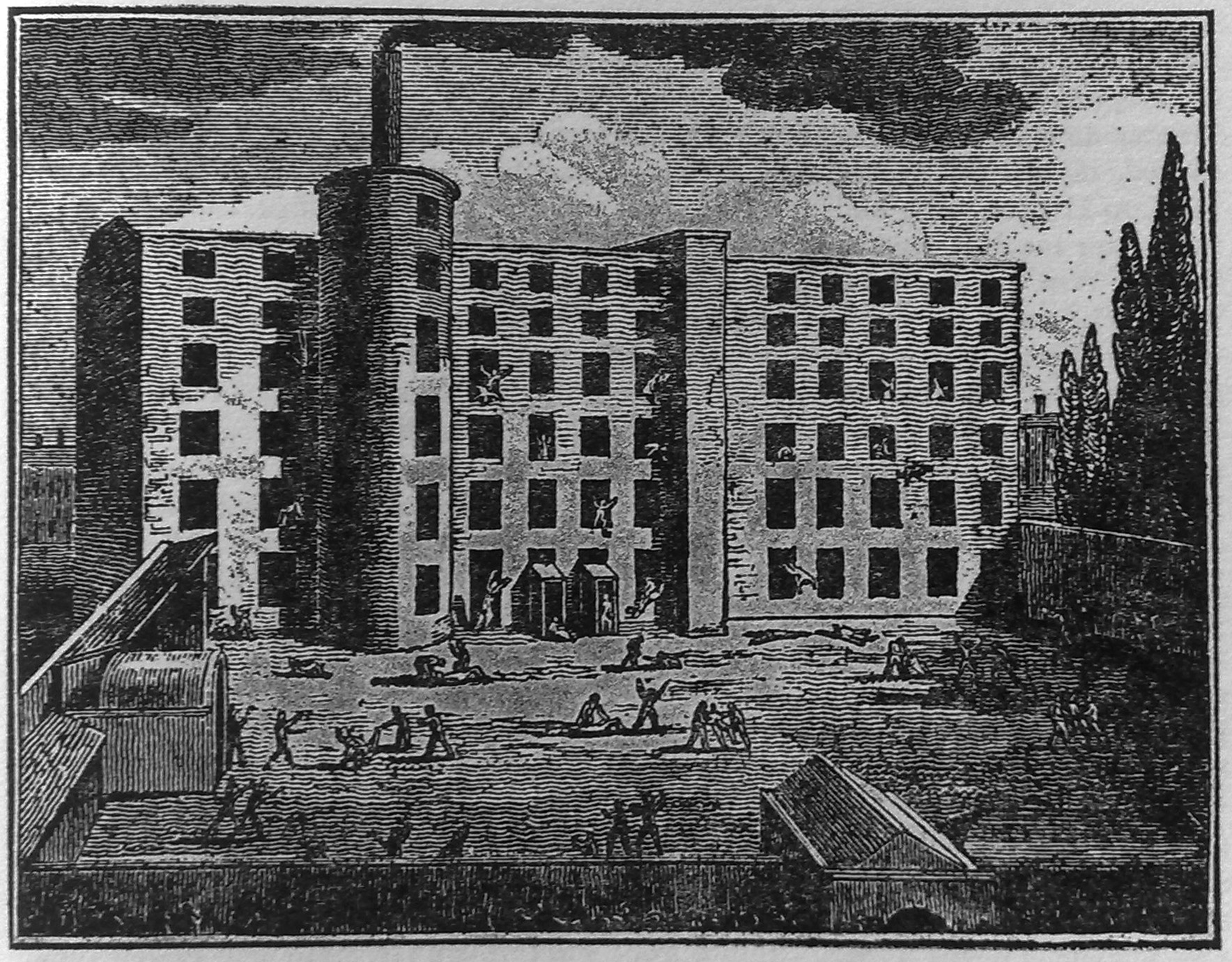
A woodcut illustrating a serious incident at Nathan Gough's spinning mill in Salford, 1824

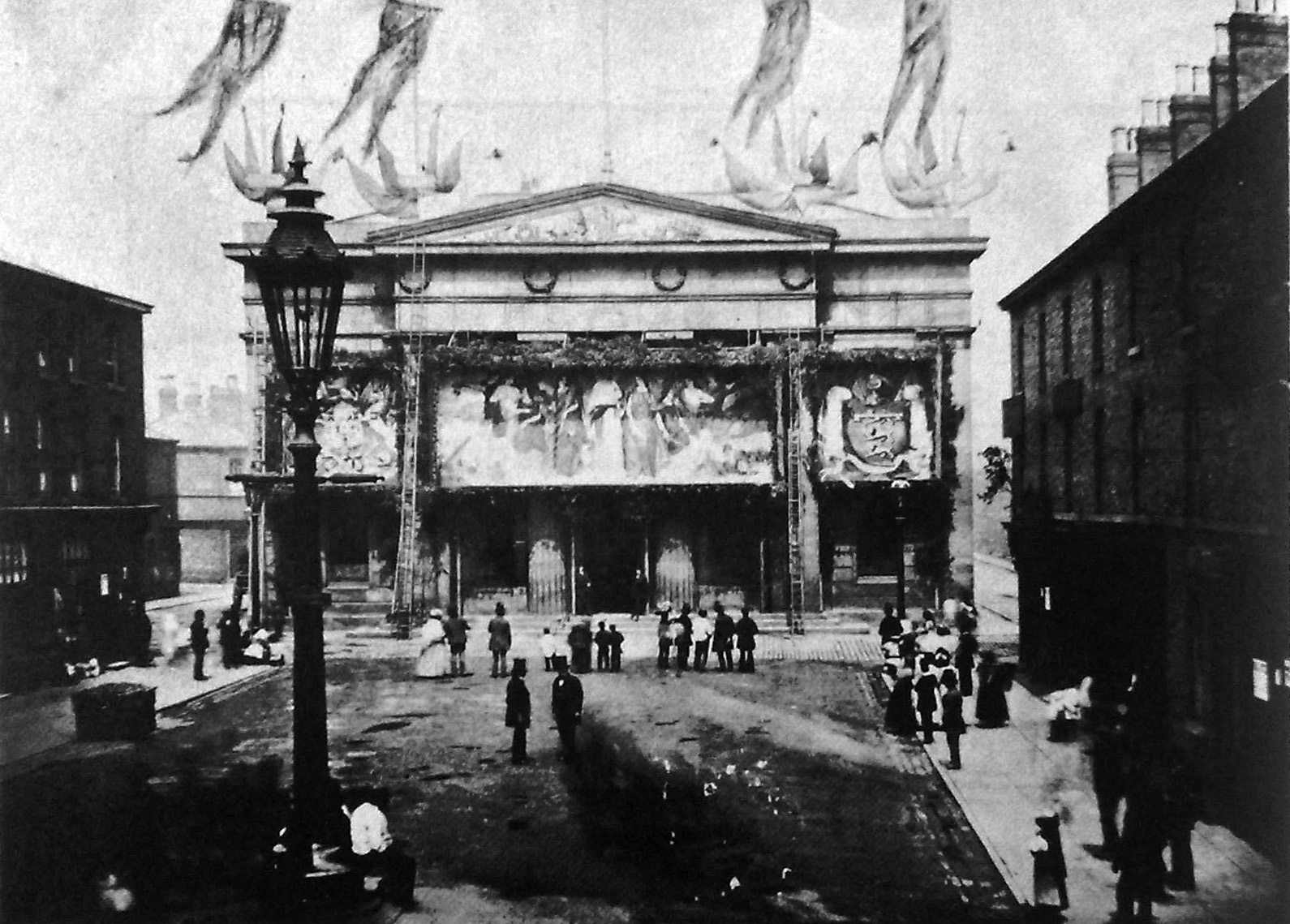
The earliest known photograph of Salford, taken at the end of the Crimean War in May 1856

Canal building provided a further stimulus for Salford's industrial development. The opening of the Bridgewater Canal in 1761 improved the transport of fuel and raw materials, reducing the price of coal by about 50%. The later Manchester, Bolton & Bury Canal (which terminated at Salford) brought more cheap coal from pits at Pendleton, Agecroft Colliery and beyond. By 1818 Manchester, Salford and Eccles had about 80 mills, but it was the completion of the Manchester Ship Canal in 1894 which triggered Salford's development as a major inland port. Salford Docks, a major dockland on the Ship Canal 35 miles (56 km) east of the Irish Sea, brought employment to over 3,000 labourers. By 1914 the Port of Manchester, most of whose docks were in Salford, had become one of the largest port authorities in the world, handling 5% of the UK's imports and 4.4% of its exports. Commodities handled included cotton, grain, wool, textile machinery and steam locomotives.

For centuries, textiles and related trades were the main source of employment in the town. Bleaching was a widely distributed finishing trade in Salford, carried over from the earlier woollen industry. In the 18th century, before the introduction of chemical bleaching, bleaching fields were commonplace, some very close to the town. In 1773 there were 25 bleachers around Salford, most to the west of the township. Printing was another source of trade; the earliest recorded in the region was a calique printer in the Manchester Parish Register of 1763. These industries became more important as Salford faced increasing competition from the nearby towns of Bolton and Oldham. As its cotton spinning industries faltered its economy turned increasingly to other textiles and to the finishing trades, including rexine and silk dyeing, and fulling and bleaching, at a string of works in Salford.

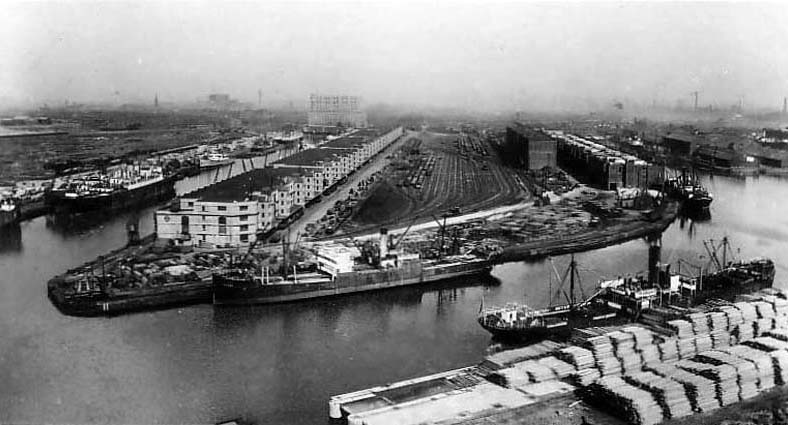
The opening of the Salford Docks turned Salford into a major inland port along the ocean-going Manchester Ship Canal. This site is now occupied by The Lowry.

Both Karl Marx and Friedrich Engels spent time in Salford, studying the plight of the British working class. In The Condition of the Working Class in England in 1844, Engels described Salford as "really one large working-class quarter ... [a] very unhealthy, dirty and dilapidated district which, while other industries were almost always textile related is situated opposite the 'Old Church' of Manchester".

The effect on Salford of the Industrial Revolution has been described as "phenomenal". The area expanded from a small market town into a major industrial metropolis; factories replaced cottage industries, and the population rose from 12,000 in 1812 to 70,244 within 30 years. By the end of the 19th century it had increased to 220,000. Large-scale building of low quality Victorian terraced housing did not stop overcrowding, which itself led to chronic social deprivation. The density of housing was as high as 80 homes per acre. Private roads were built for the use of the middle classes moving to the outskirts of Salford. The entrances to such roads, which included Elleray Road in Irlams o' th' Height, were often gated, and patrolled.

==== Inventions ====
Salford is credited as the birthplace of the bush roller chain. Hans Renold, a Swiss-born engineer, came to Salford in the late 19th century. In 1879 he purchased a small textile-chain making business in Ordsall from James Slater and founded the Hans Renold Company, what is now Renold, a firm which still produces chains. Renold invented the bush roller chain shortly after and began producing it. Used on early automobiles and trucks, it is still the type of chain most commonly used for transmission of mechanical power from bicycles and motorbikes to industrial and agricultural machinery such as rollercoasters and escalators.

=== Post-industrial decline ===
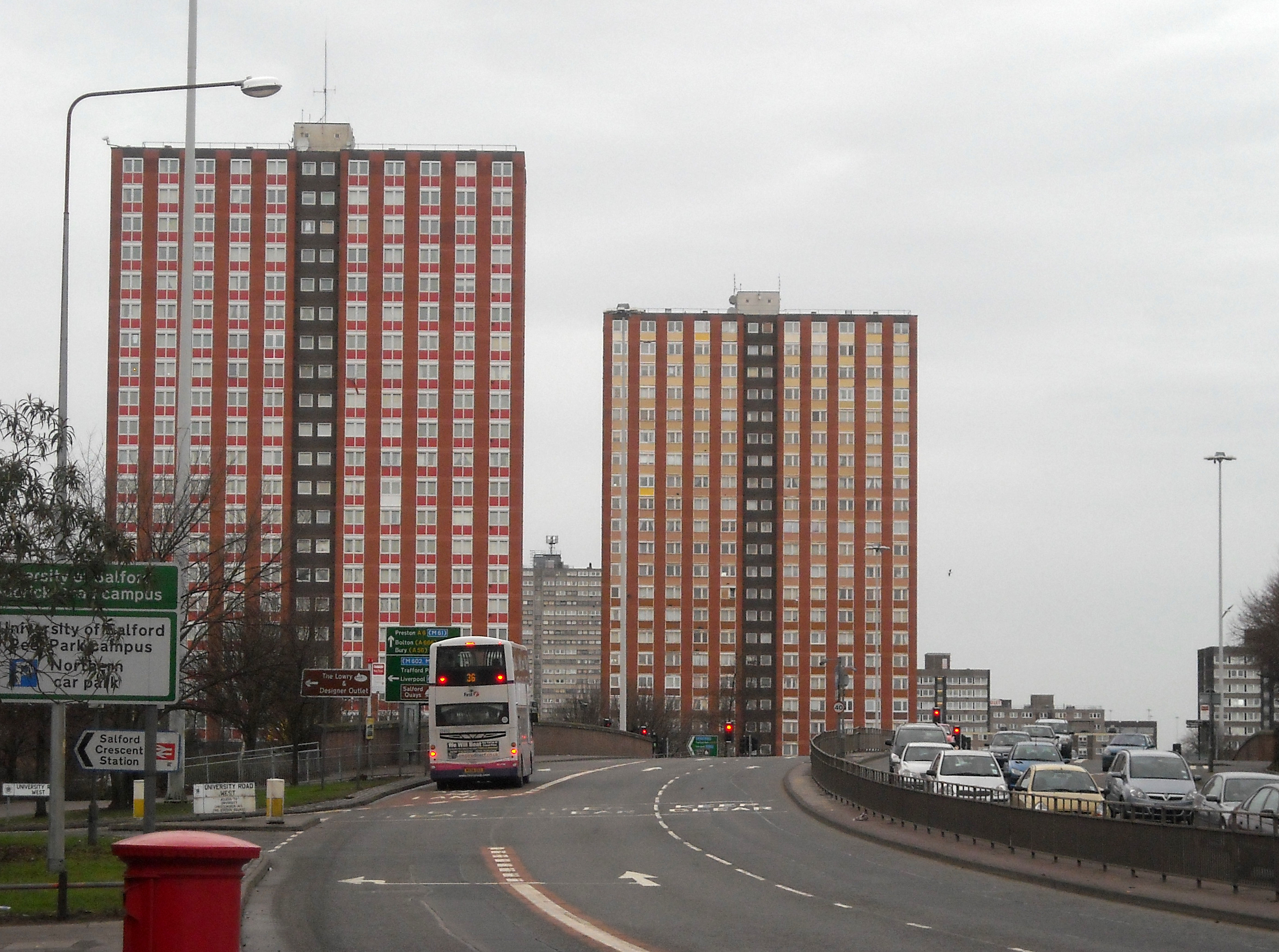
Following the demise of local manufacturing industries, a 1960s regeneration project saw the construction of over 30 tower blocks in the city, replacing many of Salford's former Victorian slums.

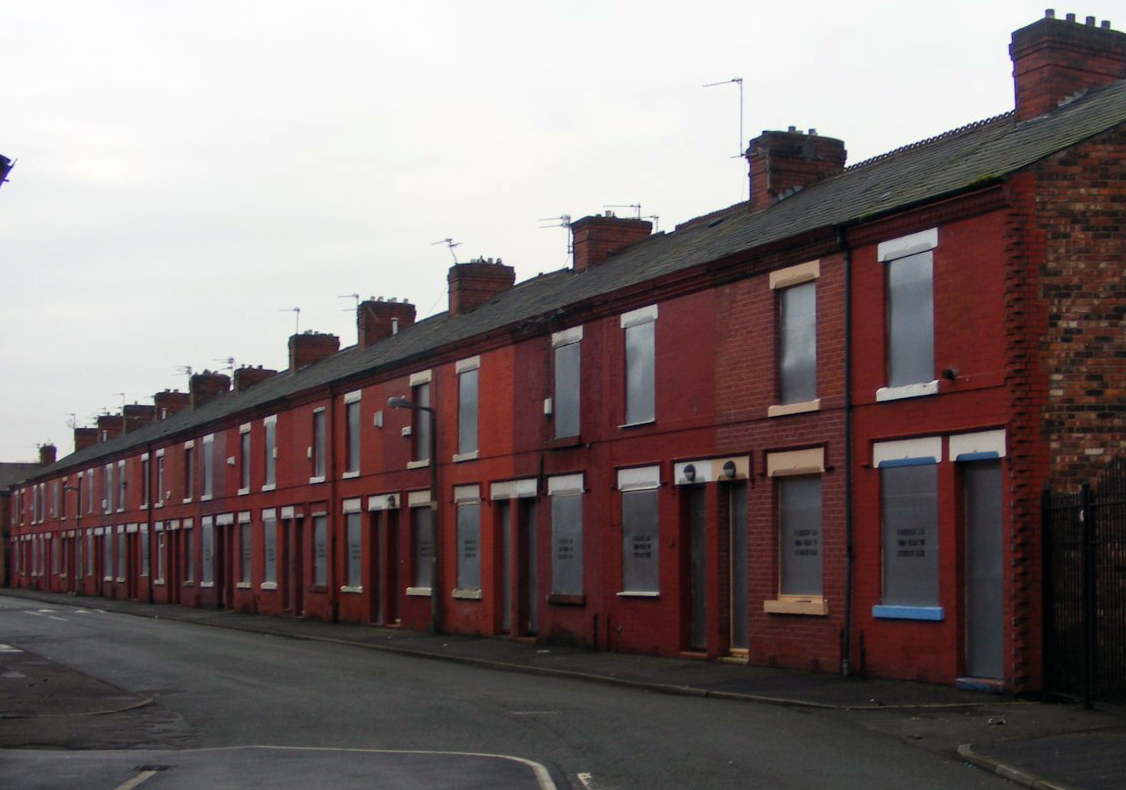
The Housing Market Renewal Initiative identified Salford as having areas with terraced housing unsuited to modern needs.

During the early 20th century, improvements in regional transport infrastructure precipitated the decline of Salford's existing industries, including those at the Salford Docks. Increased foreign competition began to undermine the competitiveness of local textile processing businesses. Life in Salford during the early 20th century was described by Robert Roberts, in his study The Classic Slum. Rising unemployment during the Great Depression of the 1920s and 1930s, and a significant economic decline in the decades following the Second World War contributed toward a fall in Salford's population.

By 1939 local coal mining had almost stopped, and, by 1971, cotton spinning had ceased completely. Between 1921 and 1939, the population of Salford decreased by 29%, from 234,045 to 166,386, far greater than the rate of decline within the whole of North West England.

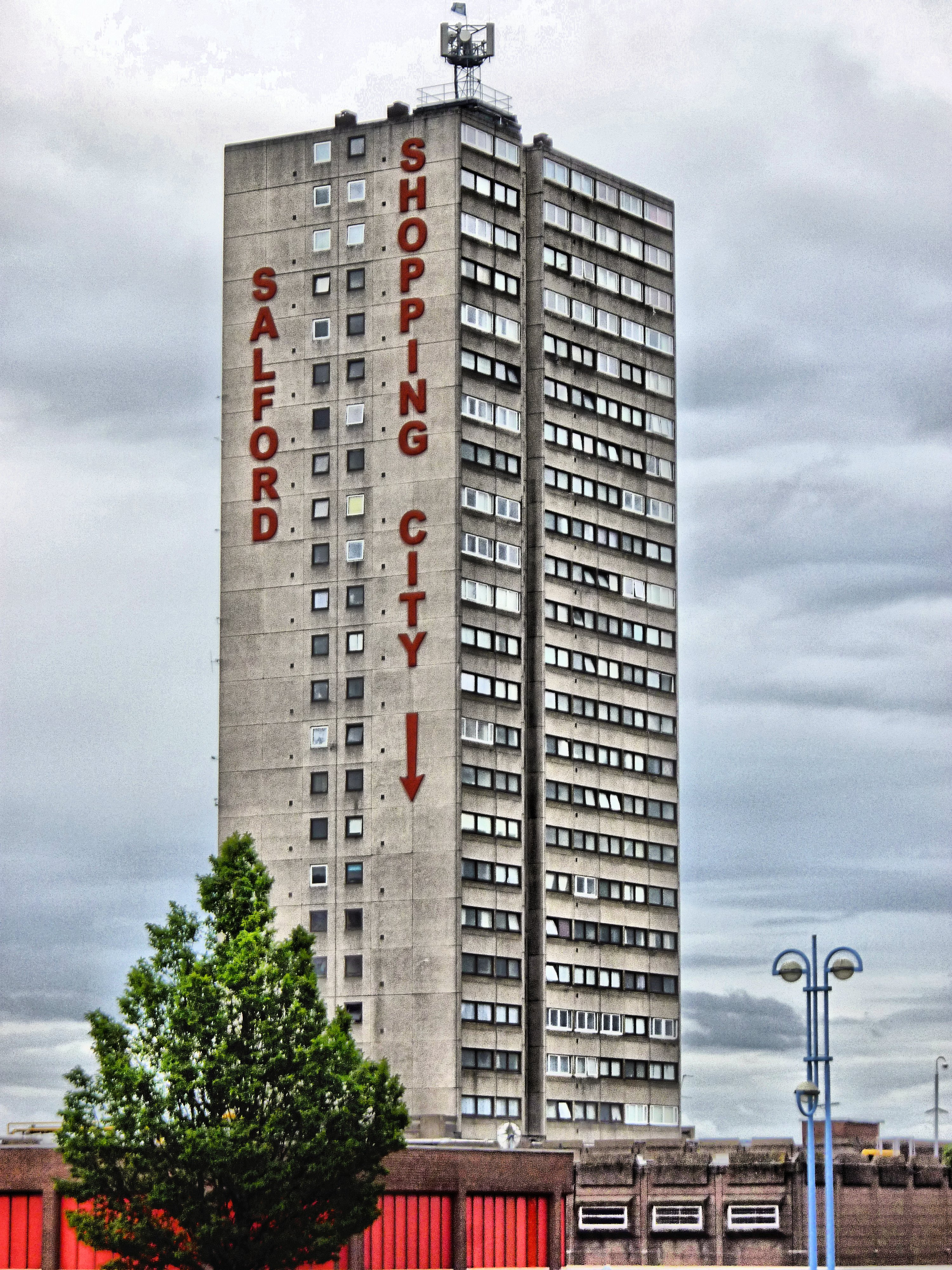
Salford Precinct was opened in the 1970s.

A survey in 1931 concluded that parts of Salford contained some of the worst slums in the country. Many houses were infested by rats and lacked elementary amenities. Inspectors found that of 950 houses surveyed, 257 were in a state of bad repair with leaking roofs, broken flooring and rotten woodwork. The inspectors were "struck by the courage and perseverance with which the greater number of tenants kept their houses clean and respectable under most adverse conditions". By 1933, slum clearance projects were under way, and by the end of 1956 over a thousand families had been rehoused in overspill estates at Little Hulton. These clearances have, for some, changed the character of the area to such an extent that "observers in search of the typical Salford may have to look in Eccles and Swinton, for much of the community and townscape ... has gone from Salford, replaced by tall blocks of flats". Large areas of the city were redeveloped in the 1960s and 1970s, with Victorian era terraced housing estates that inspired painter L. S. Lowry and soap opera Coronation Street giving way to concrete tower blocks and austere architecture. Salford Quays became the site of the second British multiplex when Cannon opened their cinema there in December 1986.

Despite extensive redevelopment, throughout the 1980s and 1990s the area experienced high levels of deprivation and unemployment, particularly during the recessions of the early years of both decades. This social deprivation was a major factor in the increased levels of gang crime linked to illegal narcotics, firearms and robberies. This was comparable to the similar issues faced in parts of neighbouring Manchester including Moss Side, as well as areas of the more distant neighbouring city of Liverpool.

Organised crime in Salford, particularly in Ordsall and Pendleton, "began to have a disturbing effect on grass roots democracy. Both the Liberal Democrats and the Conservatives announced they would not contest certain Salford wards" because they regarded them as "unsafe" and would put their "party workers at risk". Salford's social amenities and the night-time economy folded amid criminal "intimidation", "drug use, fights and demands for money". In early 2005, the government of Latvia appealed to the European Union to advise people against travelling to Salford after a Latvian man was stabbed in the head in Lower Broughton. However, a crackdown by Greater Manchester Police coupled with investment in, and structural changes to the housing stock, began changing Salford's fortunes; population decline has slowed, and Salford's city councillors have insisted it is a safe place to visit. In August 2005, a survey by Channel 4 television rated the city as the 9th worst place to live in the United Kingdom, based on criteria of crime, education, environment, lifestyle and employment.

=== Regeneration ===
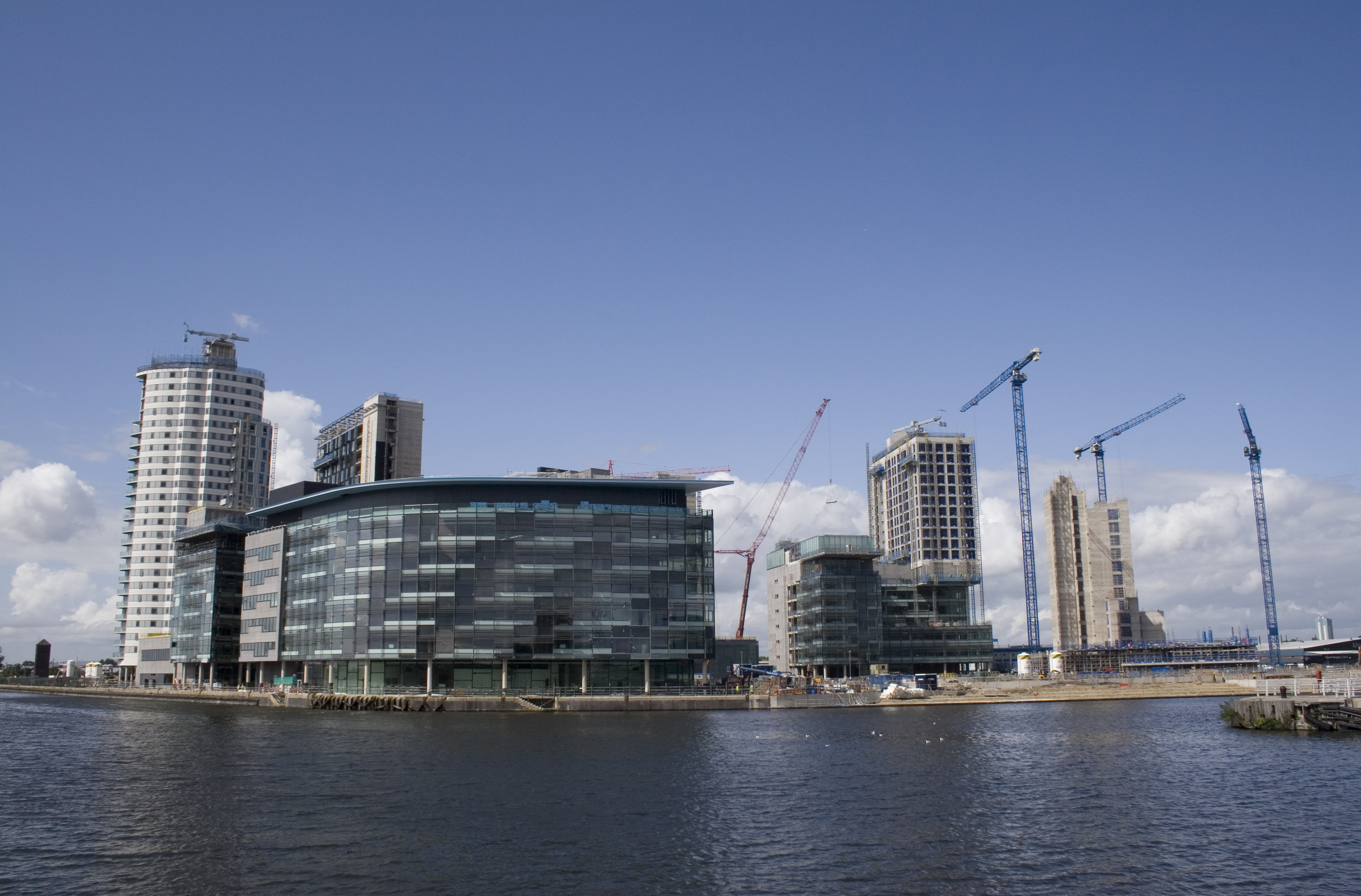
MediaCityUK. Urban renewal in Salford has been focused around Salford Quays.

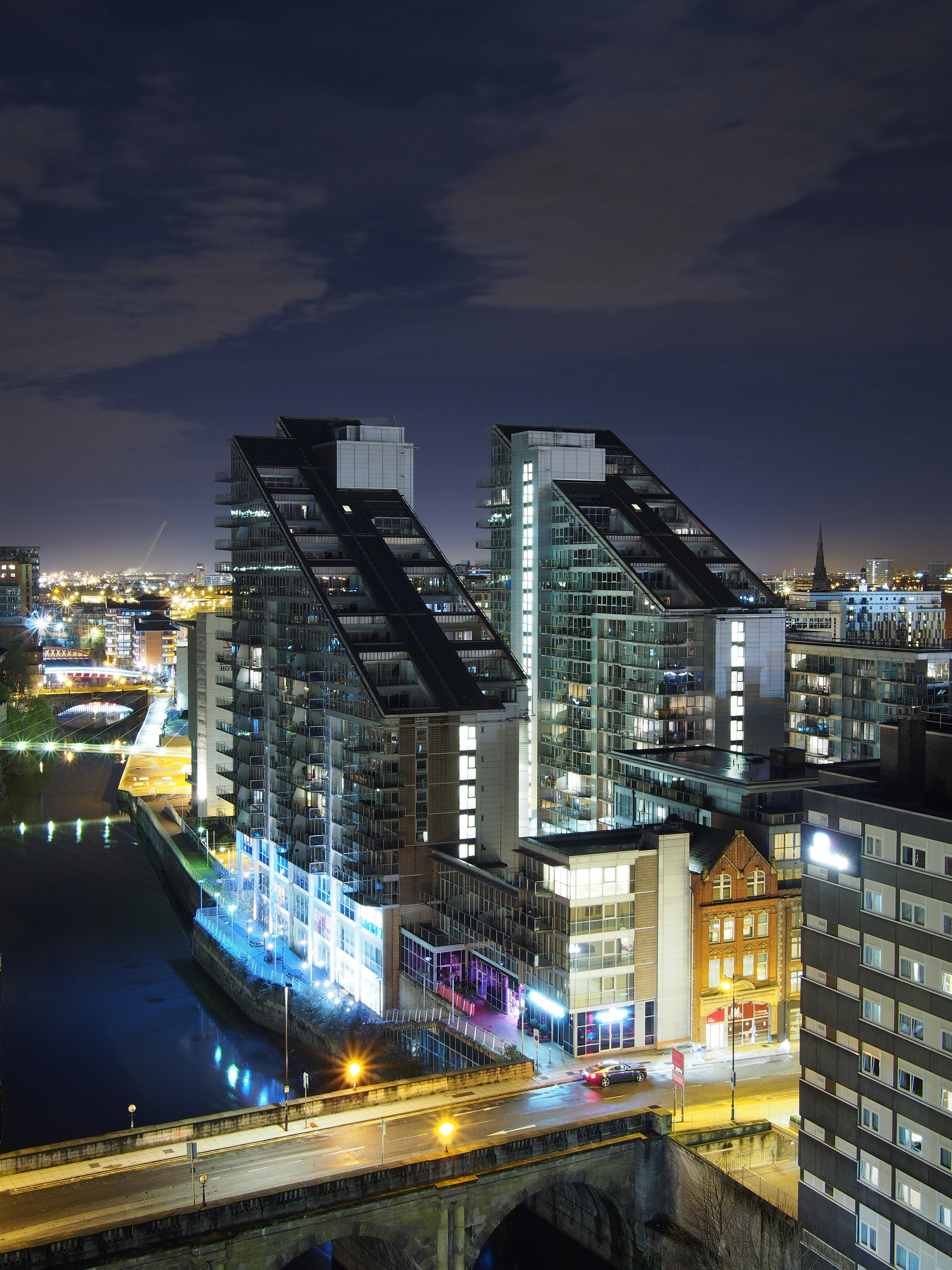
Developments in the East of Salford, on the banks of the River Irwell

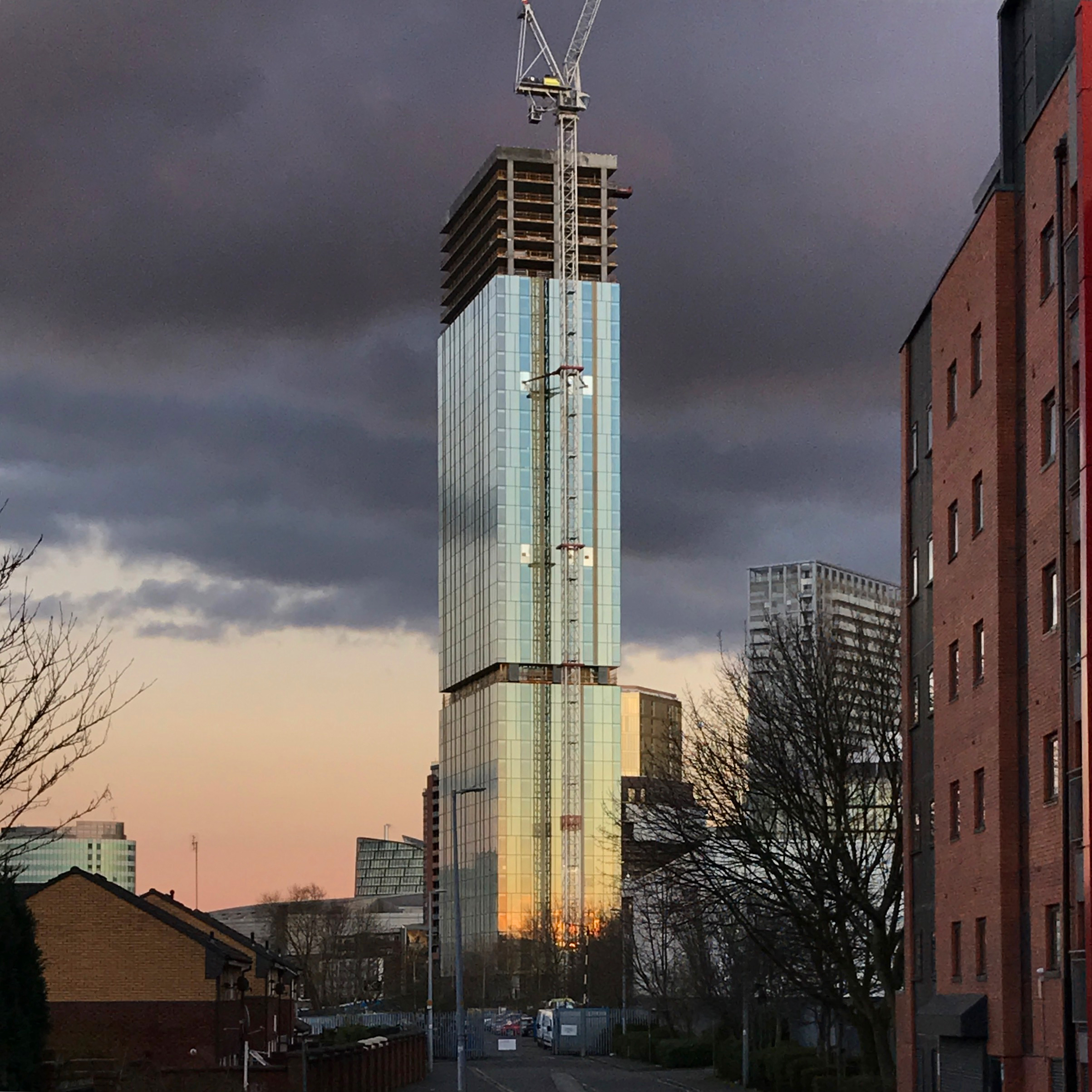
Exchange Court, the second tallest building in Salford

Salford has suffered from high levels of unemployment, housing, and social problems since around the 1960s, although there are regeneration schemes to reverse its fortunes. Many of the high-rise housing blocks from the 1960s and 1970s were demolished during the 1990s, "a sign that the great social engineering schemes (from that period) had failed". However, the high-rises that remain are a striking feature of Salford's landscape. Work was scheduled to begin on the £180 million redevelopment of the Greengate area of Salford in January 2007. The plans include the construction of what will be the two tallest tower blocks in Salford. Plans also include a five-star hotel, a new public square and park, restaurants, cafes and 403 apartments. Work is ongoing to regenerate the area known as Middlewood Locks, with the restored Salford terminus of the Manchester, Bolton and Bury Canal forming the centrepiece of a brand new residential development. As part of the Pathfinder initiative, Salford was identified in 2002 as one of nine areas in specific need of investment for new homes. Between 2003 and 2006 £115M was invested in the Manchester and City of Salford housing markets, £44M of which was invested in central Salford. Rows of terraces in neighbourhoods such as Seedley and Langworthy – once used for the title sequence of Coronation Street – are being compulsorily purchased, demolished and replaced by "modern sustainable accommodation". Other schemes such as the Charlestown and Lower Kersal New deal for Communities have concentrated on renovating existing terraced housing stock by block improvement and alleygating, as well as demolishing unsuitable properties and building new facilities, in consultation with the local community.

Salford now has many tourist attractions, such as Ordsall Hall, the Bridgewater Canal and the Lowry Centre, an award-winning theatre and art gallery complex, consisting of two theatres and three art galleries. The centre is named after the artist L. S. Lowry, who attended Salford School of Art and lived in nearby Pendlebury for 40 years. Many of his paintings of Salford and Manchester mill scenes, populated with small matchstick-like figures, are on display.

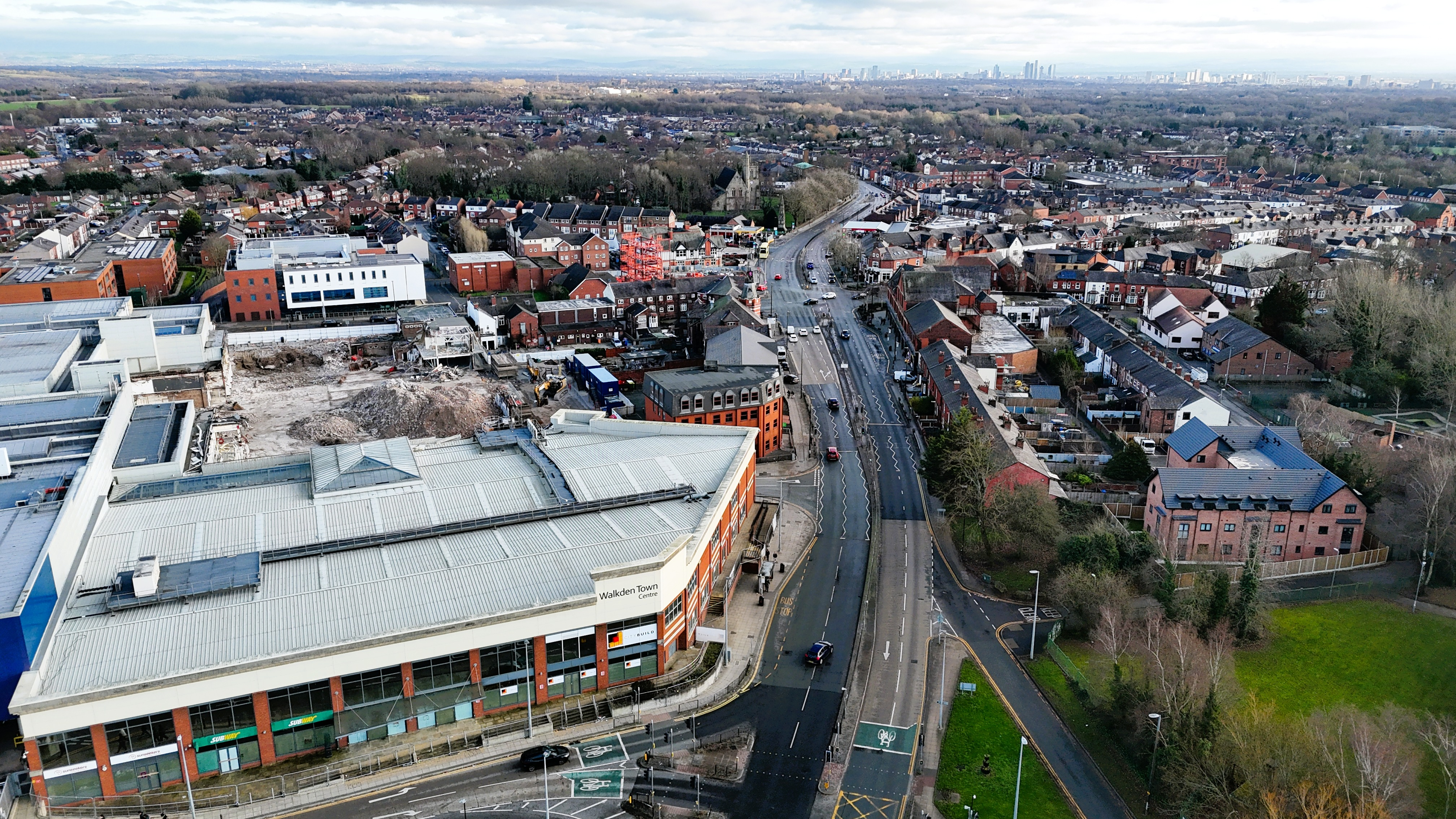
Walkden Town Centre is currently undergoing major regeneration.

A notable regeneration project is MediaCityUK, located at Salford Quays. The development houses BBC departments including CBBC, BBC Sport and BBC Radio 5 Live which moved in 2011 and BBC Breakfast, which moved from London in spring 2012.

In recent years, various large residential schemes have been built in Salford. A notable development, the £700m Middlewood Locks began construction in 2016.

A major £16m regeneration of Walkden Town Centre, which is one of seven designated main town centres in the City of Salford, commenced in 2025. The work is due to be finished in November 2026, and the new centre is expected to welcome a number of new retailers in the 'high street style' development.

== Governance ==
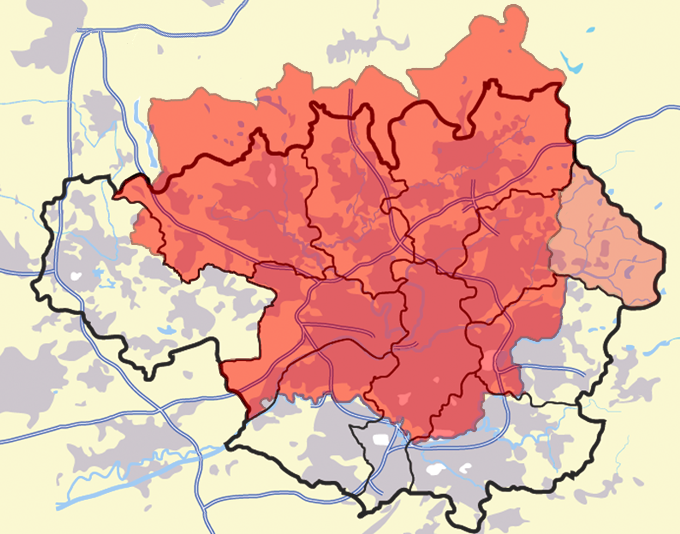
The former Salford Hundred area mapped over Greater Manchester

Salford was anciently part of the Manchester parish of the Salford Hundred, an area much larger than the present-day city of Salford, within the historic county boundaries of Lancashire. A stroke of a Norman baron's pen is said to have divorced Manchester and Salford, although it was not Salford that became separated from Manchester, but Manchester, with its humbler line of lords, that was separated from Salford. Salford received its town charter from Ranulf de Blondeville, 6th Earl of Chester, then Lord of the manor, in 1230. From then until 1791, when police commissioners were appointed, it was governed by a reeve, a medieval administrator and law enforcement official. It was not recognised as a borough in the Municipal Corporations Act 1835, but was granted borough status in 1844; the new Salford borough was made up of the township of Salford and part of Broughton. The remainder of Broughton, the township of Pendleton, and a small part of Pendlebury were added in 1853.

When the administrative county of Lancashire was created by the Local Government Act 1888, Salford was elevated to become the County Borough of Salford and was, in modern terms, a unitary authority area exempt from the administration of Lancashire County Council. Following a campaign supported by William Joynson-Hicks, Home Secretary and Member of Parliament (MP) for a neighbouring constituency of Manchester, city status was granted to the county borough by letters patent dated 21 April 1926. This was in spite of the opposition of civil servants in the Home Office who dismissed the borough as "merely a scratch collection of 240,000 people cut off from Manchester by the river". In 1961, a small part of the Municipal Borough of Eccles was added to the city, and in 1966, Salford was twinned with Clermont-Ferrand in France.

In 1974 the City and County Borough of Salford was abolished under the Local Government Act 1972, and was replaced by the metropolitan borough of City of Salford, a local government district of the new metropolitan county of Greater Manchester, with triple the territory of the former City of Salford, taking in neighbouring Eccles, Swinton and Pendlebury, and Worsley and Irlam. Both Salford and the wider City of Salford are unparished areas.

=== Parliamentary representation ===
Salford is represented by the Member of Parliament (MP) for the Salford constituency, which was (re)created in 2023 and first used in the 2024 general election. Its MP is Rebecca Long-Bailey, who has served as a Labour Party MP in Salford since 2015.

Salford was enfranchised as a parliamentary borough by the Reform Act 1832, returning a single Member of Parliament (MP). It has been subject to numerous constituency changes throughout history. From 1868 it returned two MPs to the House of Commons until the Redistribution of Seats Act 1885, when the constituency was split into three single-member divisions: Salford North, Salford South and Salford West. Boundaries changed again under the provisions of the Representation of the People Act 1948 when the constituencies were reorganised into Salford East and Salford West. From 1997, Salford lay within a reconstituted Salford parliamentary constituency. From the general election of 2010, Salford (excluding Broughton and Kersal) was part of the new constituency of Salford and Eccles until it was replaced again with the Salford constituency by the 2023 review of Westminster constituencies.

== Geography ==
At 53°28′59″N 2°17′35″W (53.483°, −2.2931°), and 205 miles (330 km) northwest of central London, Salford stands about 177 feet (54 m) above sea level, on relatively flat ground to the west of a meander of the River Irwell – the city's main topographical feature. In 1904, Salford was recorded as "within a great loop of the River Irwell ... roughly three-quarters of a mile from north to south and one mile from east to west". Salford is contiguous with Manchester, and has been described "in participation of its trade, and for all other practical purposes, an integral part of it; presents a near resemblance to it in streets and edifices; contains several public buildings and a great public park, which belong fully more to Manchester than to itself". Greengate, the original centre of Salford, is located at a fording point on the river opposite Manchester Cathedral. In 1969 Nikolaus Pevsner wrote:

That [neighbouring] Stretford and Salford are not administratively one with Manchester is one of the most curious anomalies of England.

— Nikolaus Pevsner, Lancashire, The Industrial and Commercial South, 1969

Salford

Climate chart (precipitation, max. and min. temperature)
J	F	M	A	M	J	J	A	S	O	N	D
70 6 1	50 7 1	60 9 3	50 12 4	60 15 7	70 18 10	70 20 12	80 20 12	70 17 10	80 14 8	80 9 4	80 7 2
- █ Average max. and min. temperatures in °C
- █ Precipitation totals in mm
- Source: Records and averages, Yahoo! Weather, 2008, archived from the original on 11 September 2005
Imperial conversion
J	F	M	A	M	J	J	A	S	O	N	D
2.8 43 34	2 45 34	2.4 48 37	2 54 39	2.4 59 45	2.8 64 50	2.8 68 54	3.1 68 54	2.8 63 50	3.1 57 46	3.1 48 39	3.1 45 36
- █ Average max. and min. temperatures in °F
- █ Precipitation totals in inches

The Irwell, sourced at Cliviger in Lancashire, flows from the north and for a distance forms the statutory boundary between Salford and Manchester. Flooding has historically been a problem and the Irwell has seen much modification along its course in Salford with some bends being removed, channelisation, and the construction of levees and bank reinforcements. Salford has expanded along the river valley to the north and south and on to higher ground on the valley sides at Irlams o' th' Height and Higher Broughton. Unconsolidated glacial deposits along the riverbank at Broughton have caused several landslides along the riverbank. The City Engineer's Department of the City of Salford recorded one such incident near Great Clowes Street in February 1882, and others in 1886, 1887 and 1888. In 1892 the road was propped with timber supports. The tram service along the road was discontinued in 1925, and the road closed to mechanically propelled vehicles in January 1926. Further slips saw the road closed completely in July 1933, and although no substantial movements have been recorded since 1948 slow subsidence around the Cliff continues to this day.

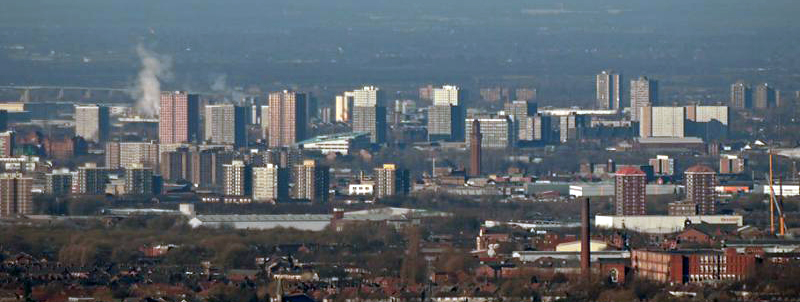
Salford's cityscape from Hartshead Pike

Salford's built environment is made up of a range of building stock. Some inner-city areas are noted for chronic urban decay. Salford's housing stock is characterised by an oversupply of older, smaller terraced housing and flatted accommodation that declined in value during the late 20th century. As demand fell, it left many owners in negative equity and often without the means to maintain their homes in reasonable condition. As a result, much of the built environment is poor.

Land use in Salford is overwhelmingly urban, with a number of green spaces. The largest is Kersal Dale country park, which covers about 32 hectares (0.32 km^{2}). Others include Kersal Moor in Higher Kersal, The Meadow, Peel Park and the adjacent David Lewis Recreation Ground close to the University of Salford, and Albert Park and Clowes Park in Broughton. The territory of Salford is contiguous with other towns on all sides, and as defined by the Office for National Statistics forms the sixth-largest settlement in the Greater Manchester Urban Area, the United Kingdom's second-largest conurbation. The M602 motorway enters Salford from Eccles to the west. The A580 "East Lancashire Road" terminates at Salford, entering the area from Pendlebury.

=== City centre ===
Salford is polycentric (has more than one centre). The main city centre could be considered to be located around Bexley Square near where the town hall and cathedral are located. However, its main shopping centres are Salford Shopping Centre in Pendleton and Salford Quays. As the city has expanded and incorporated Eccles, Walkden, Swinton and Pendlebury, there are now retail and economic centres belonging to these towns.

== Demography ==
Salford compared in the 2001 census
Demographic	Salford	City of Salford	England
Total population	72,750	210,145	49,138,831
White	93.9%	96.1%	91%
Asian	1.9%	1.4%	4.6%
Black	1.2%	1.2%	2.3%

As of the 2001 UK census, Salford had a population of 72,750. The 2001 population density was 9,151 per mi^{2} (3,533 per km^{2}), with a 100 to 98.4 female-to-male ratio. Of those over 16 years age, 44.0% were single (never married) and 36.7% married. Salford's 32,576 households included 44.1% one-person, 22.0% married couples living together, 7.6% were co-habiting couples, and 13.3% single parents with their children. Of those aged 16–74, 37.3% had no academic qualifications, similar to that of 35.5% in all of the City of Salford but significantly higher than 28.9% in all of England. 15.9% of Salford's residents aged 16–74 had an educational qualification such as first degree, higher degree, qualified teacher status, qualified medical doctor, qualified dentist, qualified nurse, midwife, health visitor, etc. compared to 20% nationwide.

As a result of 19th-century industrialisation, Salford has had "a special place in the history of the British working class"; together with Manchester it had the world's "first fully formed industrial working class". Salford has not, in general, attracted the same minority ethnic and cosmopolitan communities as in other parts of Greater Manchester, although it did attract significant numbers of Irish in the mid-19th century. Many migrated to Salford because of the Great Hunger in Ireland combined with Salford's reputation as a hub for employment in its factories and docks. In 1848, Salford Roman Catholic Cathedral opened, reflecting the large Irish-born community in Salford at that time.

In the decades following the Second World War, Salford experienced significant population decline, as residents followed employment opportunities to other locations in Greater Manchester, taking advantage of a greater choice in the type and location of housing.

Year	1901	1911	1921	1931	1939	1951	1961	1971	1981	1991	2001
Population	162,452	172,998	234,045	223,438	166,386	178,194	155,090	131,006	98,343	79,755	72,750
County Borough 1901–1971 • Urban Subdivision 1981–2001

In 2011, Salford had a population of 103,886, which is about the same size as Rochdale. The population increased from 72,750 in the previous census, mainly due to boundary changes.

Salford compared 2011
Demographic	Salford USD	Salford Borough
White British	77.3%	84.4%
Asian	5.5%	4.1%
Black	4.6%	2.8%

In 2011, 22.7% of the population in the Salford USD (urban subdivision) were non-white British, compared with 15.6% for the surrounding borough. The USD had a slightly larger percentage of Asian and black people. Salford has become a lot more ethnically diverse since the previous census, mostly due to boundary changes, but also due to the relocation of many BBC departments from London between 2011 and 2012. This has created many jobs and encouraged migration to the area, which was previously very deprived since the loss of many traditional industries in the 20th century.

According to the 2001 UK census, the industry of employment of Salford's residents aged 16–74 was 18.0% retail and wholesale, 14.4% property and business services, 12.3% manufacturing, 11.7% health and social work, 8.6% education, 7.3% transport and communications, 6.8% hotels and restaurants, 5.8% construction, 4.4% finance, 4.2% public administration, 0.6% energy and water supply, 0.3% agriculture, 0.1% mining, and 5.7% other. Compared with national figures, Salford had a relatively low percentage of residents working in agriculture. The census recorded the economic activity of residents aged 16–74, 4.4% students were with jobs, 9.1% students without jobs, 6.3% looking after home or family, 11.2% permanently sick or disabled, and 4.8% economically inactive for other reasons. The proportion of students economically active in Salford was higher than the City of Salford and England averages (3.0% and 2.6% respectively); the same is true for economically inactive students (5.1% in City of Salford and 4.7% in England). The rest of the figures were roughly inline with national trends.

== Landmarks ==
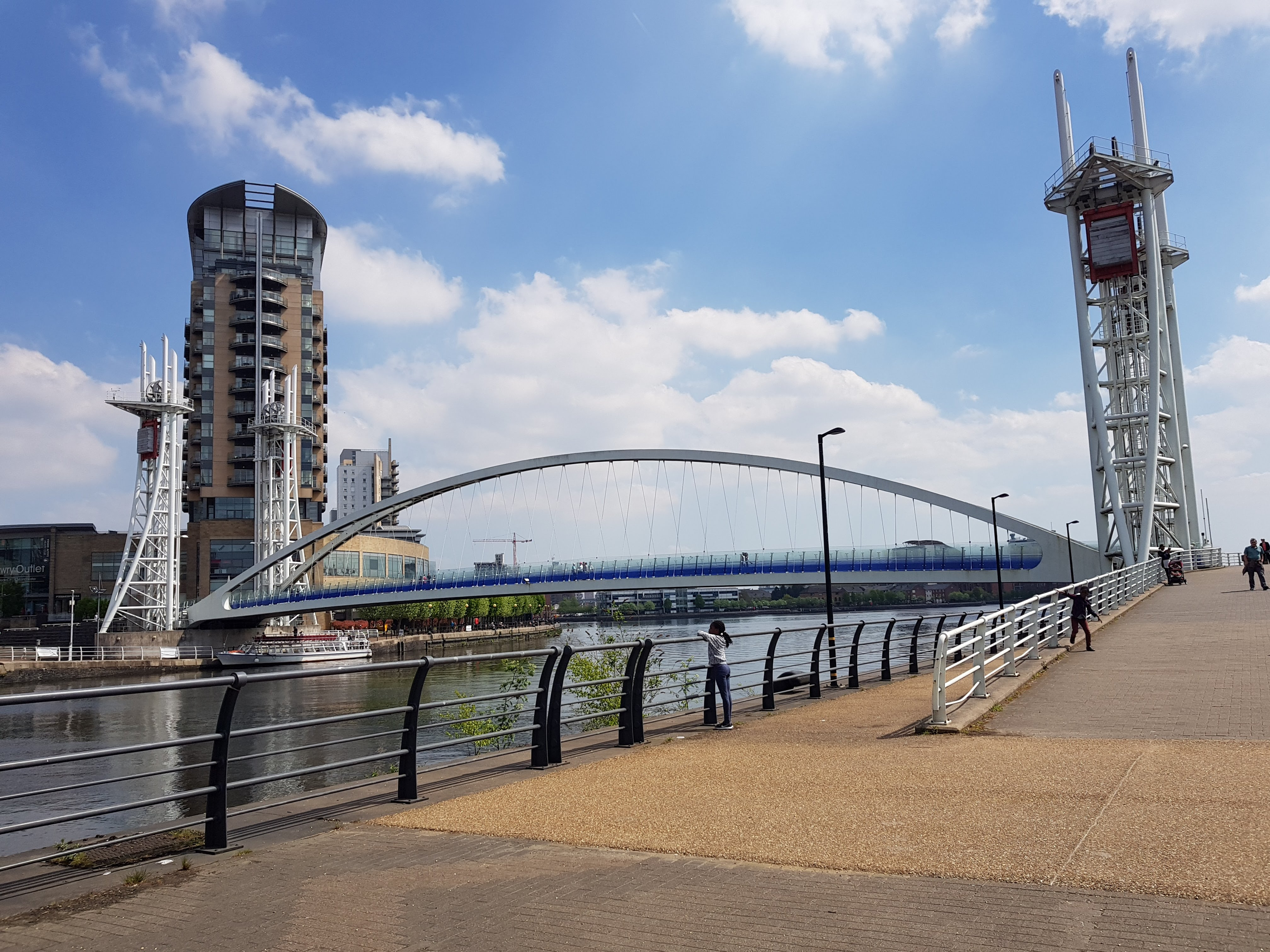
Millennium Footbridge

Salford has a series of bridges over the Manchester Ship Canal and onto the River Irwell, including the grade II listed Blackfriars Bridge, completed in 1820. The settlement is dominated by the several railway viaducts built in the 19th century.

Another grade II* listed building, Salford Cathedral, is a decorated neo-Gothic Roman Catholic church built between 1844 and 1848. Salford (Old) Town Hall, situated in Bexley Square off Chapel Street, is a Neo-classical brick building dressed in stone, designed by Richard Lane. Closer to Manchester, the tower of the Church of the Sacred Trinity dates from 1635, the main building from 1752. It was restored between 1871 and 1874. Public swimming baths were provided, on Blackfriars Road. Now in commercial use, the two-storey building was constructed in about 1890 from brick, with terracotta dressings and a part-glazed roof.

The University of Salford campus, visible partly from the Crescent, contains a number of interesting buildings including the Royal Art Gallery and the Peel Building.

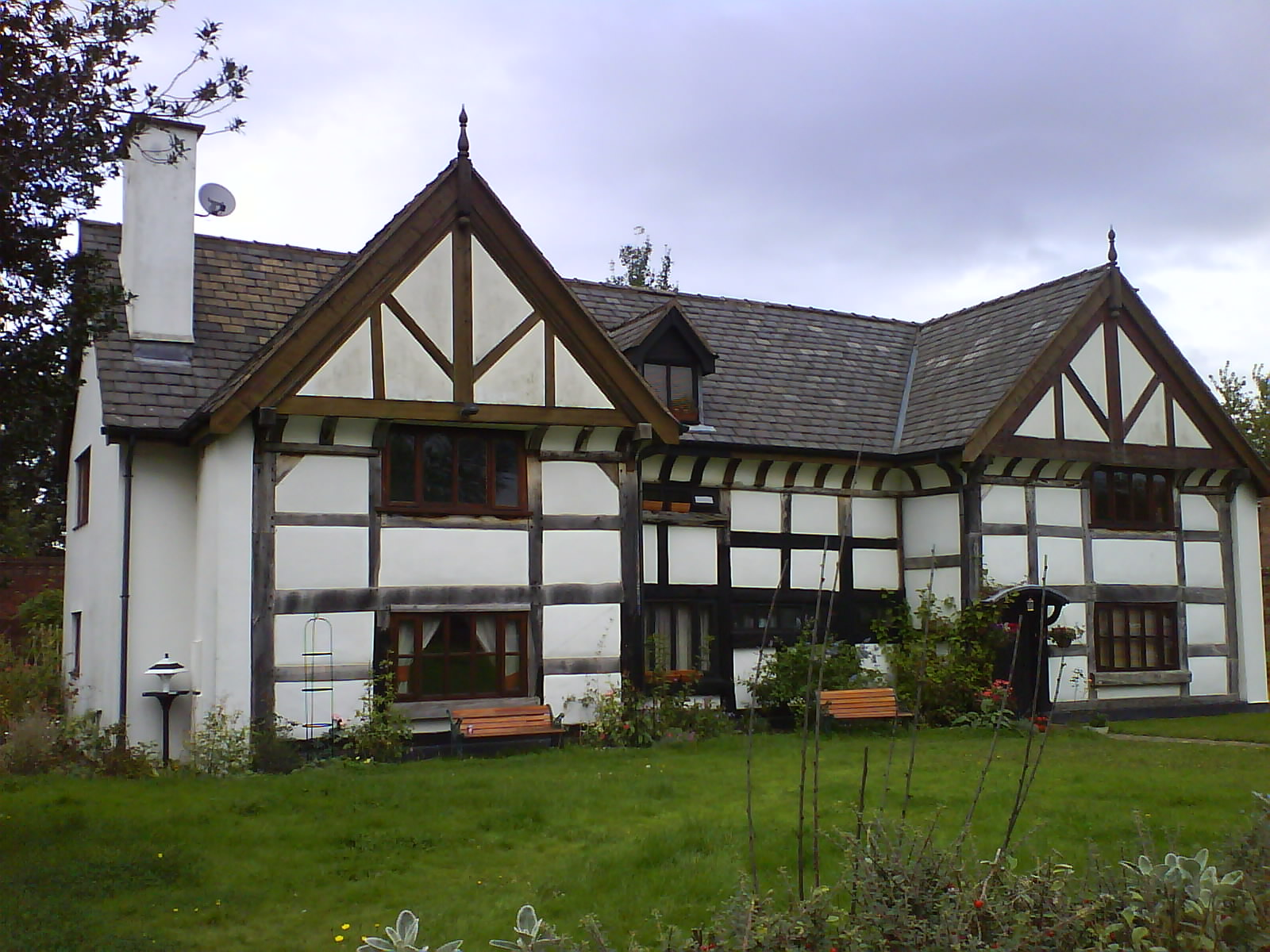
Kersal Cell

Kersal Cell is a grade II* listed 16th-century timber-framed manor house, currently in use as a private residence. One of Salford's oldest buildings is the grade I listed Ordsall Hall, a Tudor mansion and former stately home in nearby Ordsall. It dates back over 750 years, although the oldest surviving parts of the present hall were built in the 15th century.

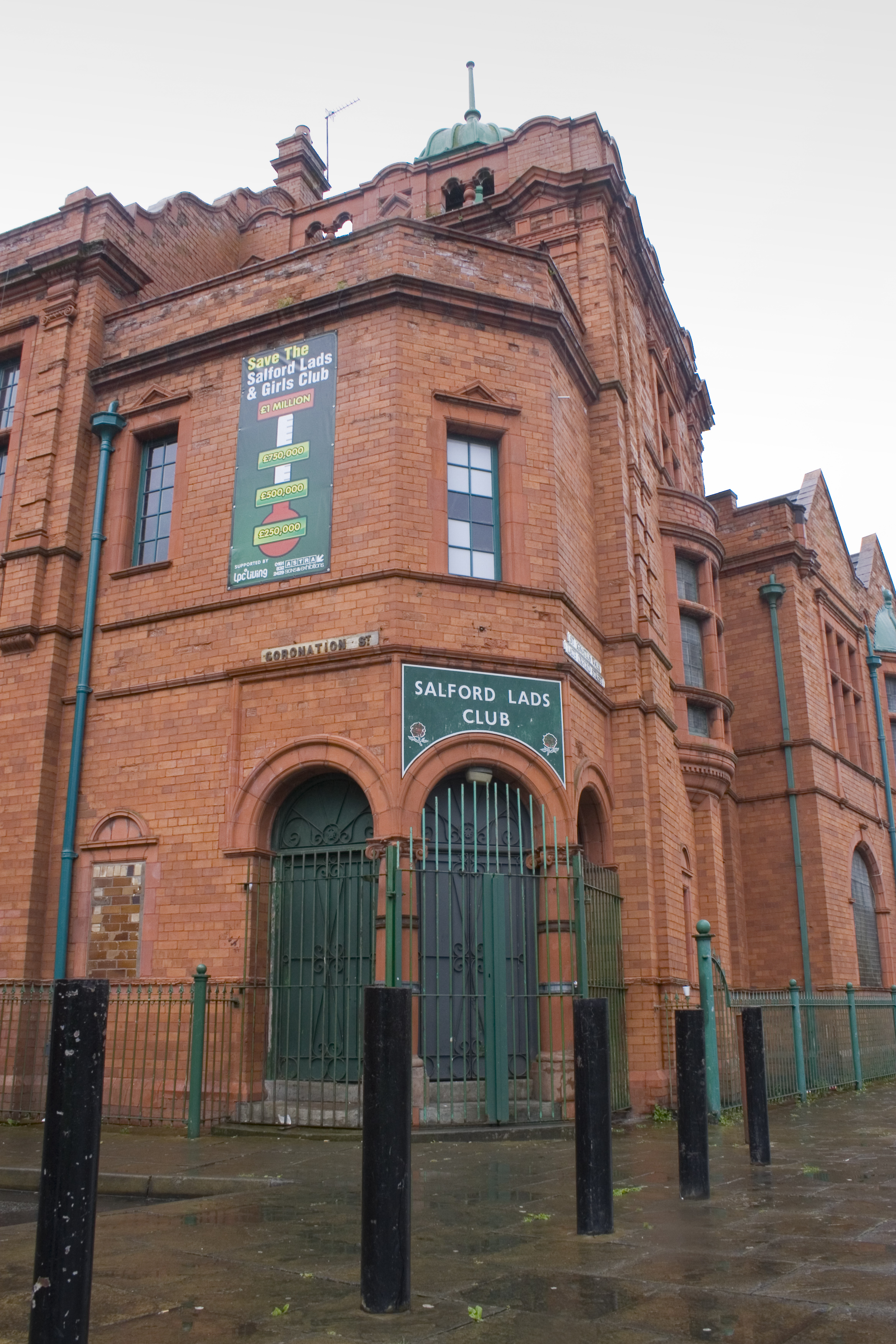
Salford Lads' Club, on the corner of St. Ignatius Walk and Coronation Street, Ordsall

Salford Lads' Club is a recreational club established in 1903 and located in Ordsall. It is a listed building and gained international fame in 1986 when the pop band The Smiths posed in front of it for the inside cover of their album The Queen Is Dead. A report by English Heritage said "The building is thought to be the most complete example of this rare form of social provision to survive in England." In 2007 the Manchester Evening News reported that the club was third in a nationwide hunt to find the most iconic buildings in the country.

== Transport ==
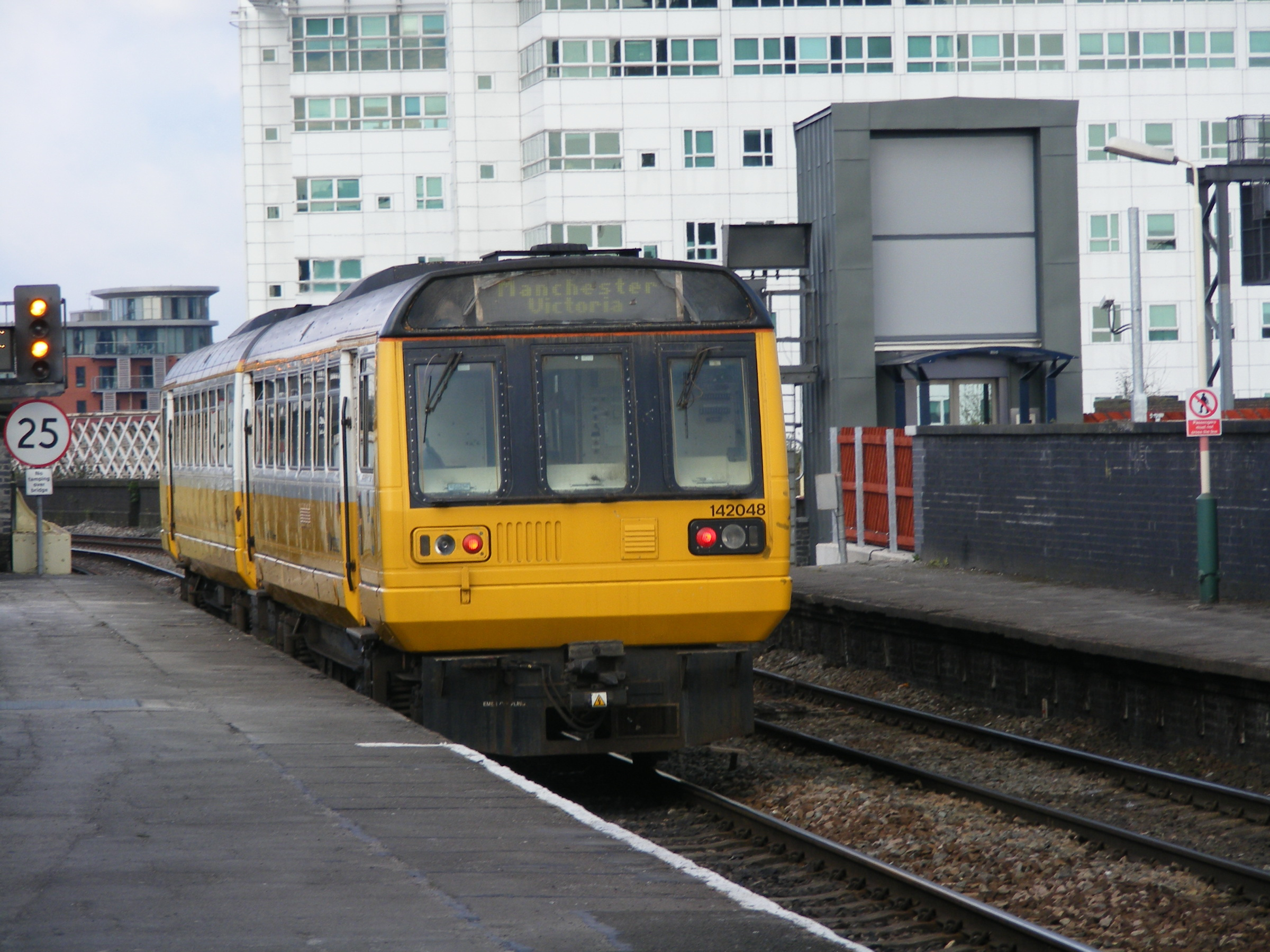
A British Rail Class 142 train departing from Salford Central railway station

One of the earliest transport schemes in Salford was constructed by the Salford to Wigan turnpike trust, by an act of Parliament, the Lancashire Roads Act 1753 (26 Geo. 2. c. 63). Turnpike roads had a huge impact on the nature of business transport around the region. Packhorses were superseded by wagons, and merchants would no longer accompany their caravans to markets and fairs, instead sending agents with samples, and dispatching the goods at a later date. However, road transport was not without its problems, and in 1808 the Manchester, Bolton and Bury Canal was connected to the River Irwell. In the main a coal-carrying canal, it provided a valuable boost to the economies of Salford and Manchester, with a large number of wharves at its terminus in Salford. Sixteen years later John Greenwood started the first horse-drawn bus operation from Pendleton to Market Street, Manchester.

The Liverpool & Manchester Railway – the world's first steam driven inter-city passenger railway – opened through Salford on 15 September 1830. The railway was primarily built to provide faster transport of materials and goods between the Port of Liverpool and mills in Manchester and surrounding towns, and stopped along the route at Ordsall Lane railway station. Almost eight years later the Manchester and Bolton Railway was opened, terminating at Salford Central railway station.

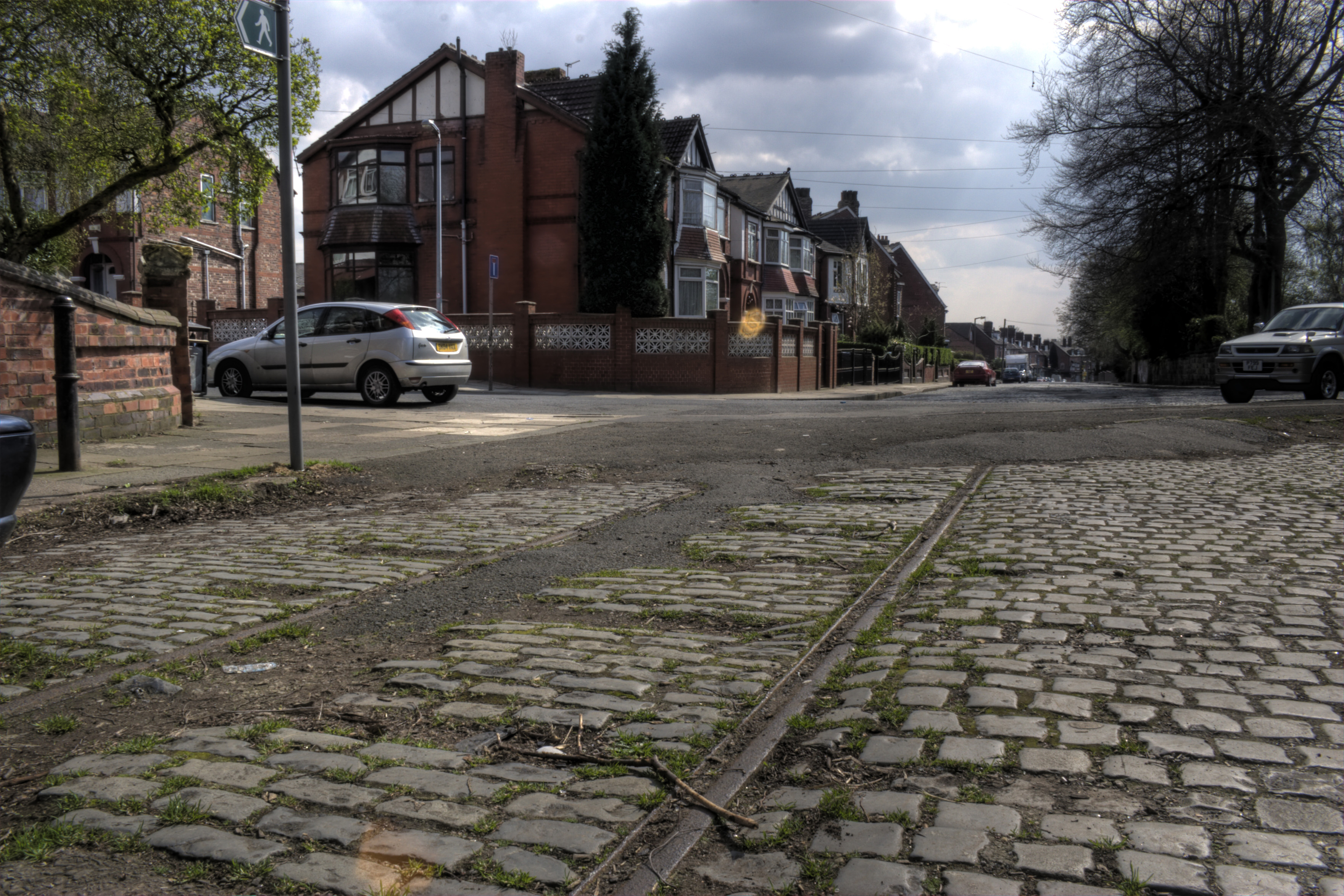
Tram lines still visible in Broughton.

By 1801 the population of both Manchester and Salford was about 94,000. By 1861 this had risen to about 460,000, and so in the same year John Greenwood Jr. made an application to Salford Borough Council and to the Pendleton Turnpike Trust, to build a tramway from Pendleton to Albert Bridge in Salford. The system was innovative in that the rails were designed to be 'flush' with the road surface, with a third central rail to accommodate a perambulator wheel attached to the front axle of the omnibus. Approval was granted and work commenced immediately, with the horse-pulled tramway finished in September 1861. It remained in use for a further eleven years when the condition of the track had deteriorated such that the council ordered it removed. The Tramways Act 1870 (33 & 34 Vict. c. 78) allowed councils to construct their own tramways, and on 17 May 1877 the 'Manchester and Salford Tramways' opened for business. The network of lines was largely complete by September 1880, the company changed its name to the Manchester Carriage & Tramways Company, and the system reached its peak in the 1890s. A steam tramway was opened on 12 April 1883 from Bury to Higher Broughton. The vehicles provoked letters of complaints from residents about the associated noise, dirt, and grease, and by 1888 the route was eventually curtailed to Besses o' th' Barn.

Electric trams were a common sight in early 20th century Salford, and had from 1901 replaced the earlier horse-drawn vehicles. A network of lines crossed the region, with coordinated services running through Salford, Manchester and the surrounding areas. Many served the new suburban housing and industrial developments built at the time, but in 1947 they were withdrawn in favour of more practical services – buses. The city is served by a complex road infrastructure, with connections from the M602 motorway to several major motorways, and A-roads including the A57 Regent Road and the A6042 Trinity Way. Salford City Council has also created both advisory and mandatory cycle lanes across the city.

Public transport in Salford is now co-ordinated by Transport for Greater Manchester (TfGM), a combined authority area-wide public body with direct operational responsibilities such as supporting (and in some cases running) local bus services, and managing integrated ticketing in Greater Manchester. Salford City Council is responsible for the administration and maintenance of public roads and footpaths throughout the city. The city is served by two railway stations, Salford Central and Salford Crescent. Most train services are provided by Northern Trains, although Salford Crescent is also served by TransPennine Express. Buses run to destinations throughout Salford, the City of Salford, across Greater Manchester and further afield: Pendleton is served by a route to Preston and Blackpool.

The Eccles line of the Manchester Metrolink runs through Salford, with stations at Exchange Quay, Salford Quays, Anchorage, Harbour City, Broadway, Langworthy, Weaste and more recently MediaCityUK. The line was opened in two stages, in 1999 and 2000, as Phase 2 of the system's development.

Since 2020, electric scooters have been available for public hire in central Salford, Salford Quays, Ordsall, Pendleton and at the University of Salford. The e-scooter hire service is operated by shared micromobility company Lime.

== Education ==
=== University and museum ===
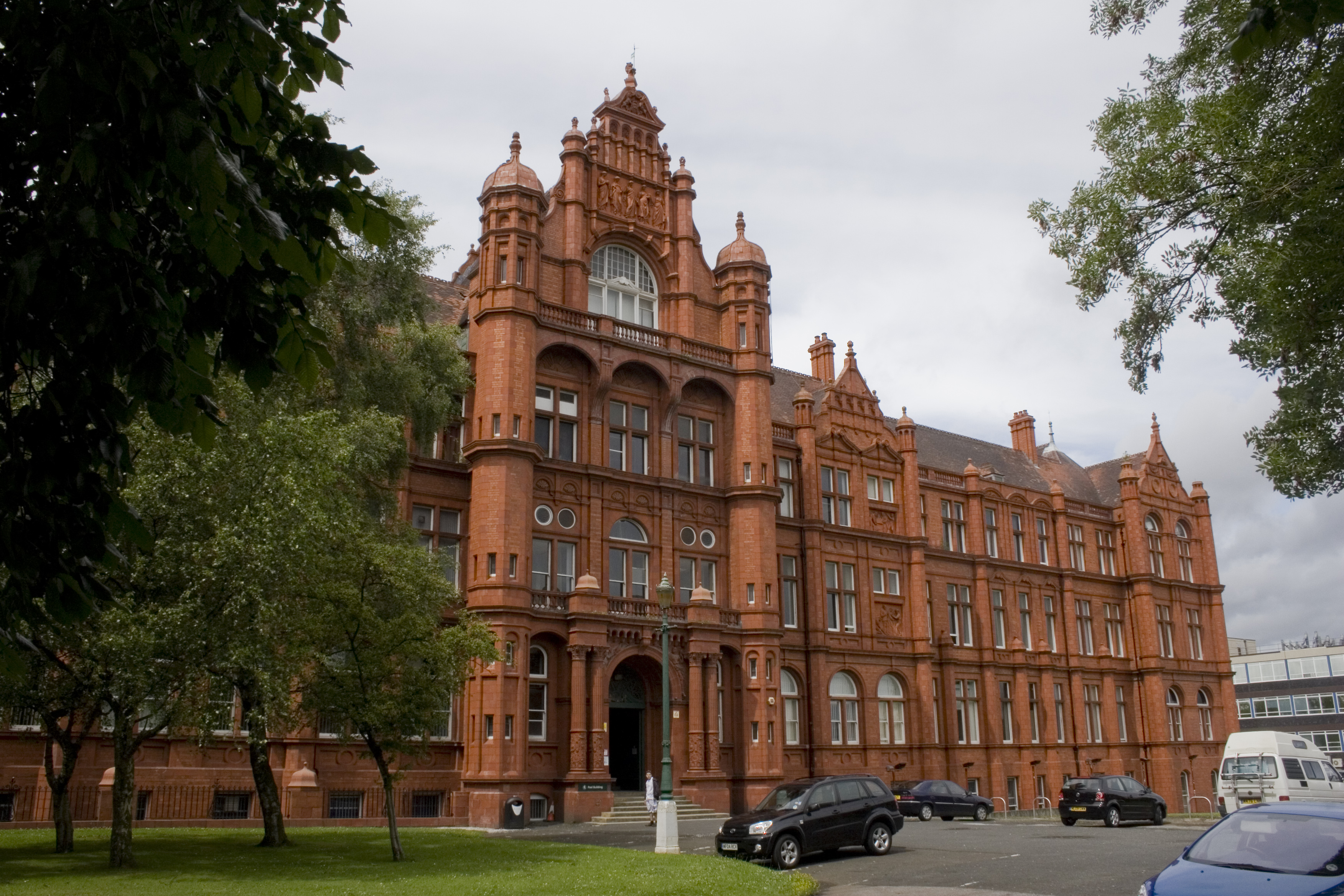
Established in 1967, the University of Salford is one of four universities in Greater Manchester. It has some 19,000 students.

The University of Salford, a plate glass university, is one of four in Greater Manchester. It has its origins in the former Royal Technical College, which was granted the status of a College of Advanced Technology (CAT), on 2 November 1956. In November 1963 the Robbins Report recommended that the CATs should become technological universities; and on 4 April 1967 a charter was established creating the University of Salford. The university is undergoing £150M of redevelopment through investment in new facilities, including a £10M law school and a £22M building for health and social care, which were opened in 2006.

The University of Salford has over 19,000 students, and was ranked 81st in the UK by The Times newspaper. In 2007, the university received nearly 17,000 applications for 3,660 places, and the drop-out rate from the university was 25%. Of the students graduating, 50% gained first class or 2:1 degrees, below the national average of about 55%. The level of student satisfaction in the 2009 survey ranged from 62% to 94%, depending on subject.

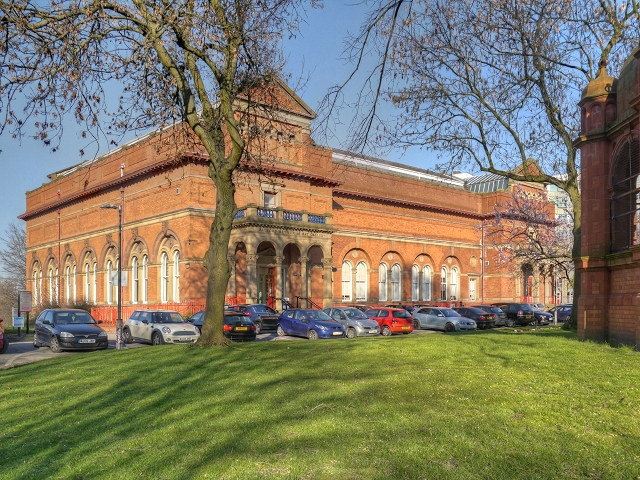
Salford Museum and Art Gallery

Salford developed several civic institutions; in 1806, Chapel Street became the first street in the world to be lit by gas (supplied by Phillips and Lee's cotton mill). Salford Museum and Art Gallery opened in November 1850, under the terms of the Museums Act 1845, as the Royal Museum and Public Library. It was built on the site of Lark Hill estate and Mansion, which was purchased by public subscription. The estate around the building was named Peel Park after Robert Peel who contributed to the subscription fund. The library was said to be the first unconditionally free public library in the country, preceding the Public Libraries Act 1850.

=== Schools and colleges ===
Despite the rapid progress made during the Industrial Revolution, by 1851 education in Salford was judged "inadequate to the wants of the population", and for those children who did get schooling "order and cleanliness were little regarded ... [they] were for the most part crowded in close and dirty rooms".

Salford has thirty-two primary schools, and five secondary schools. Further education is provided by Salford City College, which was created in January 2009 by a merger of Pendleton College, Eccles College and Salford College.

== Religion ==
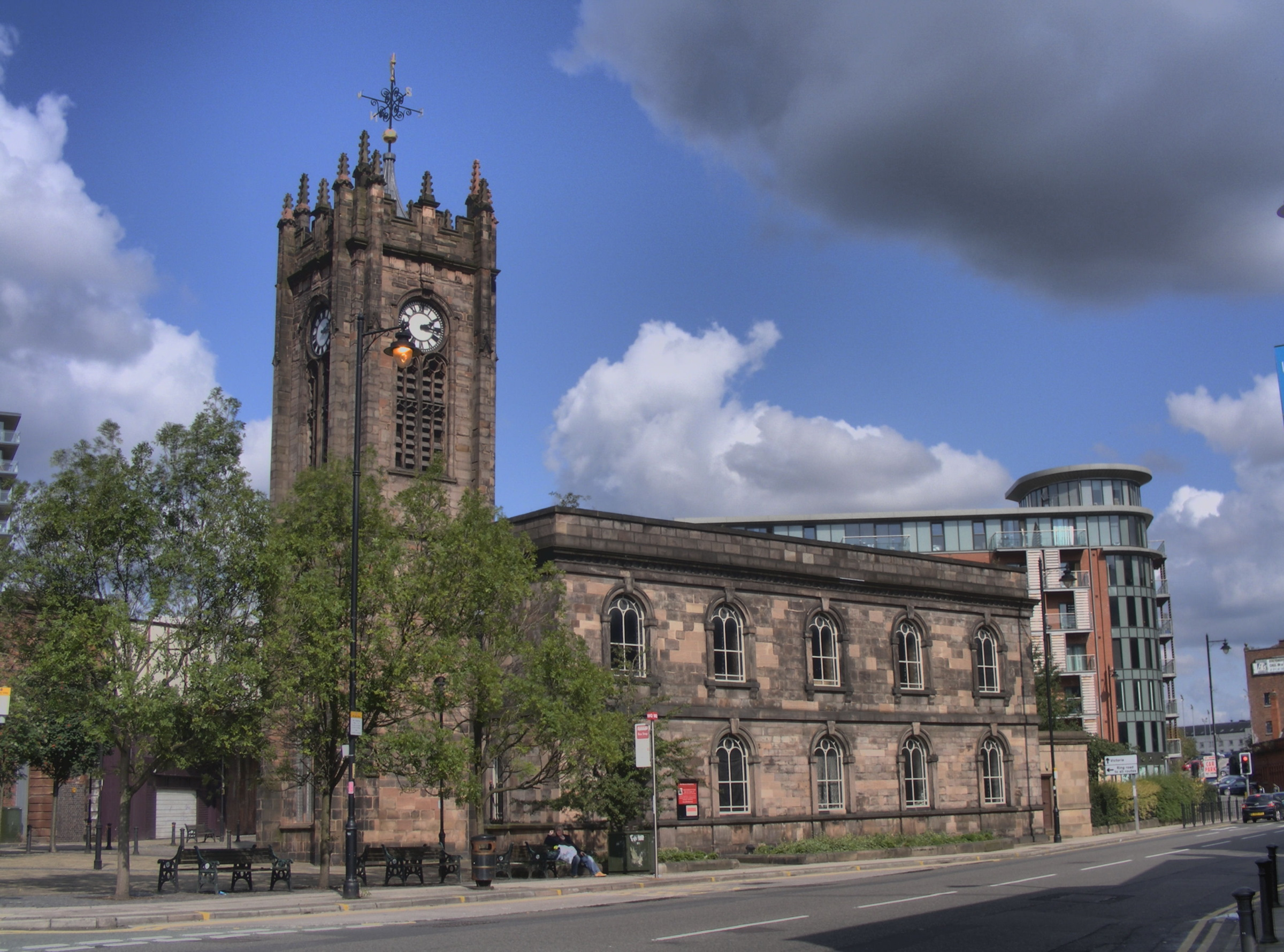
The Church of the Sacred Trinity is a grade II* listed building.

From the formation of the Hundred of Salford, the entire area was within the Diocese of Lichfield. This diocese was divided in 1541, upon the creation of the See of Chester.

Early worship took place at the parish church of Manchester, however a small chantry chapel existed in 1368 on the only bridge linking the two settlements. In the 16th century, it was converted into a dungeon, and was later demolished in 1779. In 1634–35, Humphrey Booth, a wealthy local merchant, opened a chapel of ease, which a year later was consecrated as the Chapel of Sacred Trinity (the parish of Sacred Trinity was created in 1650). John Wesley preached in the building, before his break with the Anglican Church. However, upon his return in 1747, he preached in the open, at Salford Cross. The chapel was rebuilt in about 1752–53, although the tower probably belonged to the original building. It was restored in 1871–74 by the architect J. P. Holden and a chapel was added to the south-east in 1934. It is now a grade II* listed building.

Salford Cathedral is one of the largest Catholic cathedrals in Northern England. It was built between 1844 and 1848, and was listed as a grade II* building in 1980. It is at the centre of the Roman Catholic Diocese of Salford, which was founded in 1850 as one of the first post-Reformation Catholic dioceses in Britain. Its current boundaries encompass Manchester and a large part of North West England. The Bishop of Salford's official residence is at Wardley Hall.

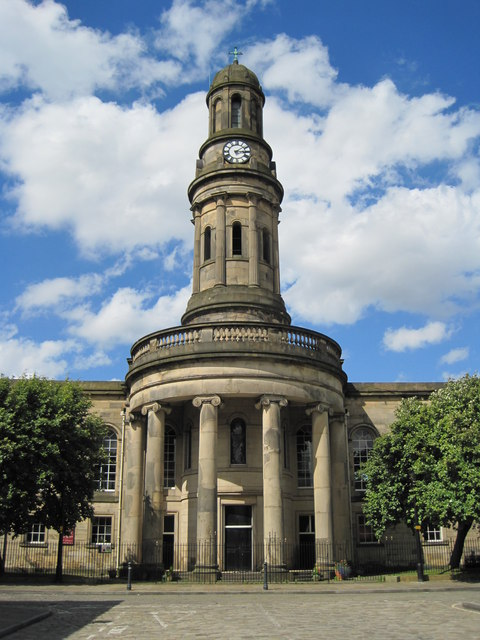
St Philip with St Stephen Church

Salford Deanery is in the Salford Archdeaconry of the Church of England. The sixteen churches in the deanery include the Parish Church of Saint Paul the Apostle in Paddington, St. Thomas' in Pendleton, St Philip with St Stephen near the town hall and St Clement's in Ordsall.

The Greek Orthodox Church of the Annunciation, Manchester was founded in 1861, in Broughton. It was established by the local Greek immigrant community, who had arrived in the area soon after the Greek War of Independence in the early 19th century. It replaced an earlier place of worship on Cheetham Hill Road, and an earlier chapel on Wellington Street. It is the oldest purpose-built Orthodox church in the country.

== Sports ==
Salford has a notable history in sports, which includes hosting some of the events in the 2002 Commonwealth Games: rugby league, speedway, and horse racing. Salford had a venue for horse racing since the 17th century; the earliest record of racing at Kersal Moor dates from 1687.

Salford Red Devils is the city's rugby league club and has been based in Salford since 1873. They participate in the Super League. Salford now play all home games at the AJ Bell Stadium. Junior rugby league is also played within Salford's boundaries, with Langworthy Reds, Folly Lane and Salford City Roosters amongst other clubs providing playing personnel to the senior club.

The Premiership side Sale Sharks play their home games at the AJ Bell Stadium since the start of the 2012–13 season

Salford Quays has been used as a major international triathlon site, but a 2009 aquathlon was cancelled because of a lack of competitors.

During the early part of the 20th century motorcycle speedway was staged at Albion Stadium.

Until Salford City's promotion to the Football League in 2019, Salford was one of the largest settlements in the UK without a league football team;. In the formative years of the sport the region's football heartland was in eastern part of Greater Manchester, with few teams to the west. Salford City are Salford's only representatives in the Football League, playing in League Two, the fourth tier of English football, as of the 2024-25 season.

== Culture ==
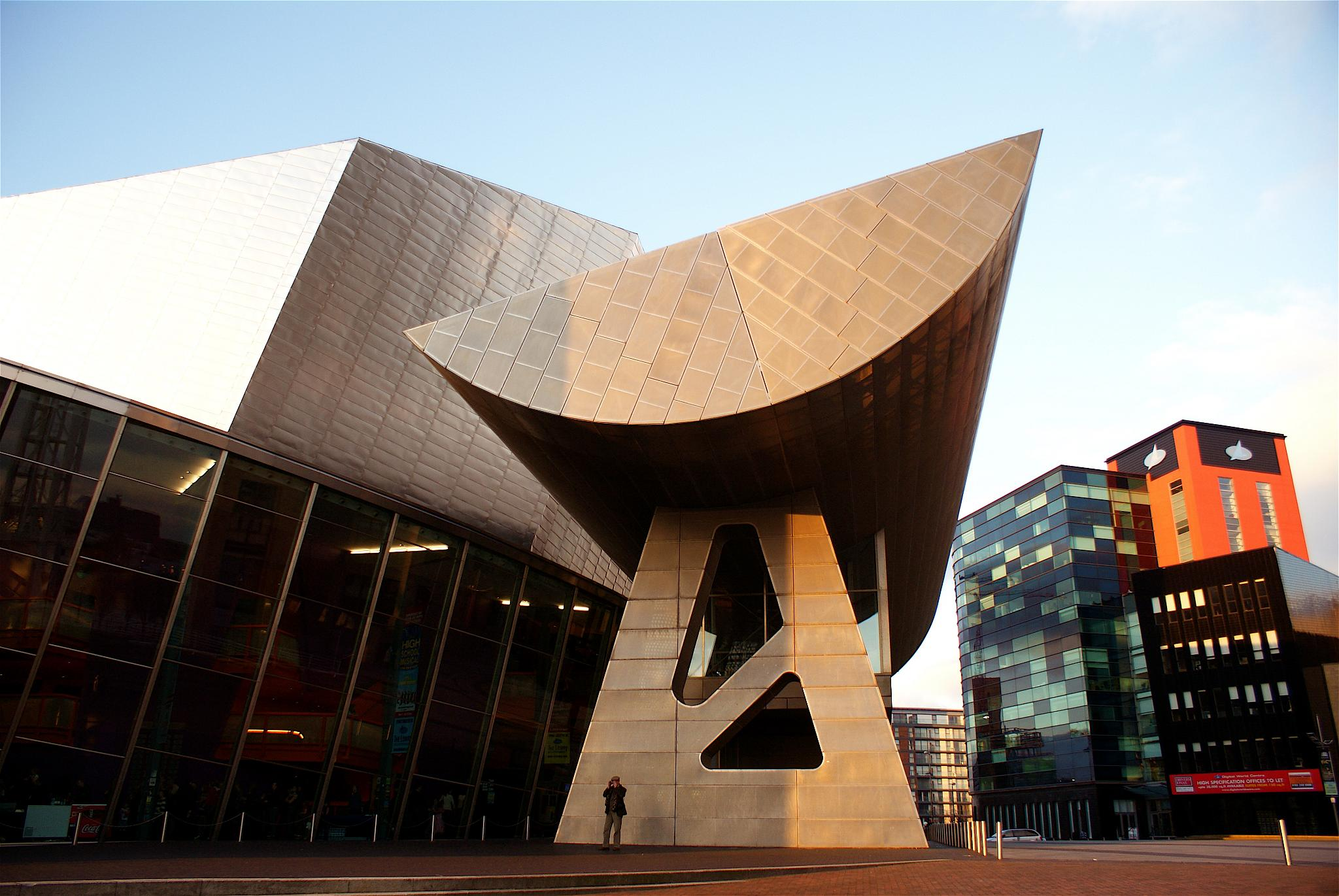
The Lowry is a combined theatre and gallery complex situated in Salford Quays, named after the painter L. S. Lowry.

Harold Brighouse's play Hobson's Choice takes place in the Salford of 1880, and the 1954 film version was shot in the town. Walter Greenwood's 1933 novel Love on the Dole was set in a fictional area known as Hanky Park, said in the novel to be near Salford, but in reality based on Salford itself. A more modern fictional setting influenced by the area is Coronation Street's Weatherfield. The Salford of the 1970s was the setting for the BAFTA award winning East is East. Salford was featured in the second series of the Channel 4 programme The Secret Millionaire, screened in 2007. Salford is also home to the theatre venue Studio Salford.

The folk song "Dirty Old Town", written by native Ewan MacColl, is the origin of Salford's nickname. Local band Doves released a song on their 2005 album Some Cities called "Shadows of Salford". One of the most famous photographs of band The Smiths shows them standing outside the Salford Lads Club, and was featured in the artwork for their album The Queen Is Dead. In 2010, The Cold One Hundred, an English indie rock band formed in Salford. The videos for the Timbaland song "The Way I Are", and the Justin Timberlake song "Lovestoned" were filmed in Salford.

== Public services ==
Under the requirements of the Municipal Corporations Act, 1835, the County Borough of Salford was obliged to appoint a Watch Committee to establish a police force and appoint a chief constable. On 1 June 1968 the Manchester and Salford city constabularies formed the Manchester and Salford Police. Since 1974, Home Office policing in Salford has been provided by the Greater Manchester Police. The force's "(F) Division" has its headquarters for policing the City of Salford at Swinton, with further police stations in Little Hulton, Higher Broughton and Salford. The Statutory emergency fire and rescue service is provided by the Greater Manchester Fire and Rescue Service, whose headquarters are on Bolton Road in nearby Pendlebury.

Salford Royal Hospital dated back to 1830 and was extended in 1911. It was closed and converted into flats. The modern Salford Royal, at Hope, near the boundary with Eccles, was opened in 1882 as the Salford Union Infirmary. Later renamed Hope Hospital and then again as Salford Royal, it is a large NHS hospital administrated by Salford Royal NHS Foundation Trust. In a 2006–07 review of all 394 NHS Trusts in England by the Healthcare Commission, Salford Royal was one of 19 to be rated excellent in its quality of services and its use of resources. The North West Ambulance Service provides emergency patient transport. Other forms of health care are provided for locally by several small clinics and surgeries.

Waste management is co-ordinated by the local authority via the Greater Manchester Waste Disposal Authority. Salford's distribution network operator for electricity is United Utilities; there are no power stations in the city. United Utilities also manages Salford's drinking and waste water.

== Notable people ==
People from Salford are called Salfordians, the city has been the birthplace to notable people of national and international acclaim. Joy Division were an English rock band formed in Salford in 1976. The group consisted of vocalist Ian Curtis, guitarist/keyboardist Bernard Sumner, bassist Peter Hook and drummer Stephen Morris which later reformed as New Order in wake of Curtis' death in 1980.

Amongst other notable persons of historic significance with a connection to Salford are Emmeline Pankhurst, one of the founders of the British suffragette movement, who lived in Salford, and the scientist James Prescott Joule, who was born and raised in Salford. The novelist Walter Greenwood (Love on the Dole) and the dramatist Shelagh Delaney (A Taste of Honey) were both born in, and wrote about, Salford.

Folk singer-songwriter and communist activist Ewan MacColl, one of the instigators of the 1960s folk revival in England, was born in Salford. He is known for writing such songs as "The First Time Ever I Saw Your Face" and "Dirty Old Town", the latter of which is about Salford. Singer-songwriter Graham Nash of the Hollies and later Crosby, Stills, and Nash grew up in Salford. Salford is also the hometown of the band Happy Mondays and punk poet John Cooper Clarke. Composer Sir Peter Maxwell Davies, who was appointed Master of the Queen's Music in 2004, was born in Salford.

Notable Salfordian sportspeople include former England football international and Manchester United F.C. midfielder Paul Scholes, who with several celebrity team mates from his Manchester United playing days bought Salford F.C. Another notable resident of Salford is Eddie Colman, the youngest of the Manchester United players to die in the Munich air disaster of 6 February 1958, when only 21. Born at Archie Street in November 1936, he lived in the area all his life and is buried at Weaste Cemetery. His former home was demolished in the early 1970s. Geoff Bent, another Manchester United player who died at Munich, was born in Salford. Other sporting Salfordians include Olympic javelin thrower Shelley Holroyd, English former snooker player Mick Price, who was born in the area, and Great Britain and England rugby league international and former Warrington Wolves front-rower Adrian Morley (later with the Salford Red Devils.) Snooker player and TV commentator John Virgo was born and grew up in Salford.

Actors Albert Finney and Robert Powell were both born and raised in Salford. Journalist Alistair Cooke who wrote and broadcast "Letter from America" for decades on the BBC was born in Salford. UFC martial artist Tom Aspinall was also born in Salford.

== See also ==
- Listed buildings in Salford, Greater Manchester
