= Phil Jones (journalist) =

British sports reporter and presenter (born 1965)

Phil Jones (born 13 February 1965) is a sports reporter and presenter, known for his work with BBC Sport and CNN. He is a university lecturer at University Academy 92 in Greater Manchester, covering journalism and media.

== Education ==
Jones obtained the NCTJ qualification in journalism from Richmond College in Sheffield in 1985. He was previously at De La Salle College, in his home town of Salford, where he was Student Council President and Editor of the college magazine.

== Journalism ==
Jones began his career in print and radio journalism. He largely covered sport for the Salford-based David Burke Press Agency, supplying material to the Manchester Evening News, Sunday Express and Piccadilly Radio, among others. He passed the NCTJ proficiency test while working for the agency.

== Broadcasting ==
Jones was the BBC's athletics reporter for some 15 years, and part of the BBC athletics team that was awarded a BAFTA for coverage of the 2009 World Championships in Berlin. He worked trackside at the London 2012 Olympics, interviewing such athletes as Usain Bolt, Mo Farah, Jessica Ennis-Hill and Greg Rutherford.

After taking a break from TV work late in 2017, Jones returned to the BBC's coverage of athletics with 'legends' features on Linford Christie, Sally Gunnell and Jonathan Edwards during the Doha World Championships output in 2019. In August 2020, Jones featured in a BBC2 documentary "Jonathan Edwards: One Giant Leap" about the triple jumper's 25-year-old world record.

Jones reported on four Summer Olympic Games for the BBC, along with four Commonwealth Games, six World Athletics Championships and all the BBC’s domestic athletics output, including the London Marathon and the Great North Run. Jones presented Grandstand several times in 2004 before its long run ended. He covered Wimbledon for more than two decades. In 2017 Jones reported from Wimbledon for the 15th year in his second spell with BBC Sport, although he first worked on the Championships as a BBC reporter in 1994 before moving to work in the United States that same year. Thereafter, he covered Wimbledon for American networks CNN and TNT until returning to the UK in 2002. Jones presented for almost eight years from September 1994 for CNN International, hosting its flagship World Sport show almost two-thousand times and co-hosting CNN's coverage of the Atlanta 1996 Olympics, Salt Lake City 2002 Winter Olympics, the FIFA World Cup in France in 1998 and both Euro 96 and Euro 2000 football tournaments. He also presented CNN's weekly golf show for two years, reported from the Masters Tournament and co-hosted the US PGA Championship for network channel CNNSi in 2001.

== Personal life ==
Jones is a member of the LGBT+ community, one of few male reporters to have worked in sports broadcasting to come out as gay/bi-sexual. "Casual homophobia is all too prevalent in and around sport and I endured it in silence for many years," said Jones after publicly coming out in 2009. "Only by coming out and being true to myself did I believe I could tackle ridiculous comments and prejudice with honesty and integrity." In later years, Jones was quoted as saying: "Casual homophobia — homophobia of any kind — in the work place is something BBC Sport has failed to properly address. The wider sports world is no better. It saddens me that we appear years away from a sporting environment in which, say, a current Premier League footballer might feel comfortable enough to come out as gay or bi. I would dearly love to be proved wrong."

== Recognition ==
Jones was one or three nominees for the 2006 Television Sports Award in the Sports News Reporter category.
