= Eccles College =

Coordinates: 53.4957°N 2.3379°W

Eccles Sixth Form College

Location
- Chatsworth Road; Salford, Greater Manchester, M30 9FJ; England

Information
- Type: Further Education
- Established: 1972
- Local authority: Salford
- Principal: Rebecca Parks
- Gender: Mixed
- Age: 16 Years Old+
- Website: salfordcc.ac.uk

Eccles Sixth Form College is a further education college in Eccles, Greater Manchester, England. It was opened in 1972.

The site provides a range of Vocational courses, across a variety of specialisms. Students are also able to retake their GCSEs at the college. Eccles Sixth Form College has an average pass rate that is above the national average.

== Merger ==
The merger of Eccles College, Salford College and Pendleton College took place on 1 January 2009, forming the new Salford City College Group.
