= Salford City College =

Coordinates: 53.493°N 2.304°W

Location
- Dronfield Road; Salford, Greater Manchester, M6 7FR; England

Information
- Type: Further Education, Higher Education
- Established: 2009
- Local authority: Salford
- Gender: Mixed
- Age: 16 Years Old+
- Telephone: 0161 631 5000
- Website: http://www.salfordcc.ac.uk/

Salford City College is a further education college in Salford, Greater Manchester. It offers A-levels, T-Levels, Vocational and Adult courses. It is a family of colleges consisting of Pendleton College, Eccles College, Future Skills, City Skills and Worsley College which merged in 2009.
