= Pendleton College =

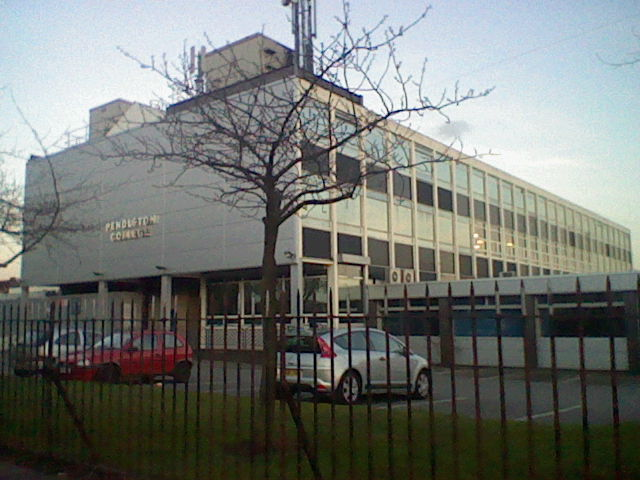

Location
- Dronfield Road, Pendleton; Salford, Greater Manchester, M6 7FR; England; 53.4952°N 2.3033°W

Information
- Type: Sixth form college
- Established: 1973
- Closed: 2009
- Local authority: Salford City Council
- Department for Education URN: 130509 Tables
- Ofsted: Reports
- Head of College: Sosa Pragsi
- Age range: 16–18
- Website: www.pendcoll.ac.uk (inactive)

Pendleton College was a sixth form college in Pendleton, Salford, Greater Manchester, England. It was established in 1973 and merged with Salford College and Eccles College to form Salford City College in 2009.

== History ==
The college was established in 1973 from the sixth forms of the Salford Grammar School for Boys (whose buildings were re-used for Buile Hill High School) and Pendleton High School for Girls. In 1997, Pendleton combined with the close-by De La Salle Sixth Form College (a former direct grant grammar school). People from all over the Salford and Manchester area attend the college. Over the years, it has received a number of national awards for academic achievement. In September 2007, the 260-seat Eccleston Theatre was named after Salford's Christopher Eccleston. It received A-level results similar to Eccles College.

== Campuses ==
It had three campuses:

- Sitec Centre — Netherland Street, Weaste; near the start of the M602, between Eccles New Road (A57) and Broadway (A5186).
- Pendleton Centre – Dronfield Road.
- De La Salle Centre – Weaste Lane (B5228); near the junction with Eccles Old Road (A576). A former grammar school, this campus closed at the end of the 2011/2012 academic year and the buildings were demolished in late 2013.

=== 2009 merger ===
On 1 January 2009, it merged with Salford College and Eccles College to form Salford City College.

== Prime Minister's Global Fellowship ==
The school had its first two students attain places on the prestigious Prime Minister's Global Fellowship programme in 2009.

== Notable former pupils ==
=== Pendleton College, Salford ===
- Tom Glynn-Carney, actor, King Aegon Targaryen in House of the Dragon and starred as Shane in The Ferryman at the Royal Court Theatre, the Gielgud Theatre and on Broadway at the Bernard B. Jacobs Theatre. Tom was the winner of the Evening Standard Theatre Awards 'Best Newcomer' in the West End and the Drama Desk Award for 'Best Featured Actor' on Broadway for his role in The Ferryman.
- Michelle Keegan, actress, starred in Coronation Street as Tina, Fool Me Once, as Maya & Brassic as Erin.
- Catherine Tyldesley, actress, starred in Coronation Street as Eva, Scallywagga as Sarah, Scarborough as Sarah and Lilies as Iris. She has recently starred as Blanche in the UK Tour of Bonnie & Clyde.
- Faye Brookes, actress, starred in Coronation Street as Kate Connor, winning the Best Newcomer Award at the 2017 NTAs. She has also appeared in multiple stage shows such as West End production of Grease (musical) as Frenchy, UK Tours of Chicago as Rosie, Shrek the Musical as Fiona, Legally Blonde as Elle Woods and Strictly Ballroom as Fran. She was also a Finalist in Dancing on Ice in 2021.
- Mollie Gallagher, actress, stars as Nina in Coronation Street. Won 'Best Serial Drama Performance' at the 2021 NTAs for the role.
- Max Parker (actor), actor, starred in Emmerdale as Luke, Vampire Academy as Mikhail, Blood, Sex & Royalty as King Henry and Casualty as Base.
- Chris Johnson, actor and CBBC presenter
- Maiya Quansah-Breed, actress, original Catherine Parr in Six and went on to appear in the UK Tour, West End and Feature film productions. Also appeared in Diana as Diana and the Hope Mill Theatre productions of Rent as Mimi and Head Over Heels as Philoclear.
- Melissa James, actress, starred as Satine in the West End production of Moulin Rouge and appeared in UK Tours of The Bodyguard, Cats, RSC productions of West Side Story and The Magician's Elephant and as Louise in the Royal Exchange Theatre production of Gypsy. She has also appeared in the TV Series of The Castaways on Paramount+, Coronation Street, The Diplomat, The Wheel of Time and Holby City.
- Benjamin Yates, actor, appeared in West End productions of Jersey Boys as Tommy, Cats as Mungojerrie (also on UK & European Tour), School of Rock as Doug/Mr Spencer and UK Tours of The Wizard of Oz as Scarecrow, Wonderland, Grease as Sonny and the World Arena tour of Jesus Christ Superstar.
- Joe Gill, played Finn in Emmerdale and in the UK tours of By The Waters of Liverpool and Harry and The Full Monty as Lomper.
- Amelia Atherton, actress, appeared in the UK tour of Waitress.
- Olivia Brereton, actress, appeared as Christine in the West End and UK Tours of The Phantom of the Opera and in the UK & International Tour of Les Misérables.
- Sam Lathwood, actor, appeared in the West End productions of Matilda, Mary Poppins, Charlie and the Chocolate Factory, A Christmas Carol, and UK tours of Hairspray, Matilda and Elf and an international tour of Mary Poppins'
- Ren Harvieu, singer.
- Reuben Johnson, actor & writer, appeared as Sean in Prisoners' Wives and Pikeman William Stout in Doctor Who. He wrote, directed and starred in the play Territory which also became a feature film.
- David Atkins, actor, appeared in Hollyoaks as Rob, Doctors as Tyler and Doctor Who as Rob. He recently appeared in Passenger as Nina's Husband.
- Scott Paige, actor, appeared in West End productions of The Great British Bake Off Musical as Jim, Nativity! The Musical as My Poppy/My Rye, Made in Dagenham and in the UK tours of I Should Be So Lucky as Michael, The Addams Family as Fester andChitty Chitty Bang Bang as Goran.
- Rachel Moran, actress, appeared in West End productions of Matilda, Bugsy Malone, Just for One Day, & Juliet, A Christmas Carol, Groundhog Day and Jesus Christ Superstar.
- Jordan James Bridge, dancer/choreographer.
- Jo Foster, actor, starred in West End productions of & Juliet as May and Just for One Day as Bernie.
- Lucca Chadwick-Patel, actor, starred in West End production of Mean Girls as Kevin G, and was in the West End production of Mamma Mia as Eddie and the UK tour of My Beautiful Laundrette as Omar.
- Liam Ainsworth, actor, appeared as Simon in Emmerdale and also in In The Dark and Beowulf: Return to the Shieldlands amongst others.
- Andrew Patrick-Walker, actor, appeared in the West End, Manchester and international productions of Bat Out Of Hell and multiple productions around the UK.
- Rebecca Gilliand, actress, appeared in West End production of Wicked as understudy Elphaba (and played the role multiple times). Also in the world premiere production and Cast Recording of The Clockmaker's Daughter.
- Scott Bruton, singer/actor, appeared in the 4th series of The X Factor finishing 10th and the West End & UK Tour productions of Dreamboats and Petticoats.
- Gabriella Stylianou-Burns, actress, appearing the West End production of Six as multiple roles. She previously appeared in the West End production of The Great British Bake Off Musical.
- Harriet Caplan-Dean, actress, appeared in the UK Tour and West End productions of Six as 'superswing'. Previously performed in the UK Tours of Chitty Chitty Bang Bang and Oliver.
- Liam Gartland, Theatrical Producer
- Abey Bradbury, writer/actor, writer and star of JULIE: The Musical.
- Dylan Morris, actress, appeared in Coronation Street as Lucy and Emmerdale as Tia.
- Rowan Robinson, actress, star of Passenger as Katie and in the Royal Exchange Theatre production of A Taste of Honey as Jo.

=== De La Salle College, Salford ===
- Sir Ben Kingsley, actor, Oscar, BAFTA, Grammy and Golden Globe winner. Recipient of a star on the Hollywood Walk of Fame. After an illustrious stage career, her went on to star in films such as Gandhi as Mahatma Gandhi, Schindler's List as Itzhak Stern, Bugsy as Meyer Lansky, Sexy Beast as Don Logan, Hugo as Georges Méliès, Iron Man 3 as Trevor Slattery/The Mandarin alongside many others.
- Tony Wilson, founder of Factory Records
- Benedict Wong, actor, 'Wong' in Doctor Strange, Avengers: Infinity War, Avengers: Endgame, Shang-Chi and the Legend of the Ten Rings, Spider-Man: No Way Home and Doctor Strange in the Multiverse of Madness
- Anthony John Abbott, Governor of Montserrat from 1997 to 2001
- Laurie Cassidy, footballer
- Barry Cockcroft, Chief Dental Officer for England at the Department of Health since 2006
- Kevin Cummins, photographer (particularly of musicians)
- Fred Done, founder of Betfred in 1967, now based in Birchwood
- Steve Drath, co-founder of Priority Records
- Terry Eagleton, literary theorist, John Edward Taylor Professor of English Literature at the University of Manchester from 2006 to 2008
- Peter Eckersley, Head of Drama in 1960s and 1970s at Granada Television, former husband of Anne Reid
- John Golland, composer and musician
- Francois Gordon, British ambassador to Algeria from 1996 to 1999
- Mick Groves, singer and guitarist with the Spinners folk group
- Terry Hall, ventriloquist with Lenny the Lion
- Frank Hayes, cricketer, played for Lancashire and England from 1970 to 1984
- Phil Jones, sports journalist
- Ged Keegan, footballer
- Walter Kershaw, Rochdale muralist
- Michael McDonagh, music artist manager (Ralph McTell and others), photographer and video producer/director (Daniel O'Donnell and others)
- Simon McDonald, Baron McDonald of Salford, head of the Diplomatic Service from 2015 to 2020, ambassador to Germany 2010 to 2015, ambassador to Israel from 2003 to 2006; married to the daughter of Patrick Wright, Baron Wright of Richmond
- Edward Nally, Chairman of the Governors of Pendleton College from 2000 to 2007
- Tony Neary, rugby union player
- John Pyle, Professor of Physical Chemistry since 2007 at the University of Cambridge, and Director since 1992 of the Centre for Atmospheric Science
