= Temko =

Temko is a surname. Notable people with the surname include:

- Allan Temko (1924–2006), American architectural critic and writer
- Florence Temko (1921–2009), British origami artist
- Ned Temko (born 1952), American journalist and newspaper editor

== See also ==
- Tomko
