= David F. Kessler =

British publisher and author

David Francis Kessler
- Born: 6 June 1906; Pretoria, South Africa
- Died: 24 November 1999 (aged 93); Stoke Hammond, Buckinghamshire, England, U.K.
- Education: Leighton Park School University of Cambridge
- Occupations: Publisher, author
- Spouse: Matilda Kessler
- Children: 1 son, 3 daughters
- Parent: Leopold Kessler

David Francis Kessler, (Note: His surname has also been spelled Koesler.) OBE, (6 June 1906 - 24 November 1999) was a British publisher and author. He was the managing director of The Jewish Chronicle.

== Early life ==
David Kessler was born on 6 June 1906 in Pretoria, South Africa. His father, Leopold Kessler, was a friend of Theodor Herzl, an early proponent of Zionism, and a shareholder of The Jewish Chronicle.

Kessler was educated at Leighton Park School in Reading before graduating from the University of Cambridge, where he earned a bachelor's degree in law and economics.

== Career ==
Kessler began his career by working for Antonin Besse, an oil and shipping businessman with ties to the Royal Dutch Shell in Aden, Yemen. He subsequently worked for the Palestine Potash Company, later known as the Dead Sea Works, in Jerusalem.

Kessler became the managing director of The Jewish Chronicle in London in 1935. In 1946, he dismissed the editor, Ivan Greenberg, who was deemed too divisive. Instead, he appointed John Maurice Shaftesley, who remained in the post until 1958, when he hired William Frankel.

Kessler wrote two books. He was a founding member of the Minority Rights Group. He served as the chairman of the Falasha Welfare Association and the Wiener Library in London. He was awarded the OBE in the 1996 New Year Honours "for services to the Jewish Chronicle and to the Jewish community".

== Personal life and death ==
Kessler and his wife Matilda had a son, and three daughters. They resided in Stoke Hammond, Buckinghamshire, England, where he died on 24 November 1999.

== Works ==
- Kessler, David (1996). The Falashas: A Short History of the Ethiopian Jews. London: Frank Cass. ISBN 9780714646466. OCLC 33078505.
- Kessler, David (1996). The Rothschilds and Disraeli in Buckinghamshire. Aylesbury, Buckinghamshire, U.K.: Rothschild Waddesdon. ISBN 9780952780908. OCLC 54503723.
