= Salford Grammar School =

Location
- Leaf Square (1914–1955); Eccles Old Road (1956–1973); Salford, Greater Manchester; England; 53.4933°N 2.3043°W

Information
- Type: Grammar school
- Motto: "Audendum dextra"
- Established: 1904
- Closed: 1973
- Local authority: Salford City Council
- Gender: Boys
- Age: 11 to 18
- Enrolment: 500
- Houses: Gloucester, Lancaster, Warwick, York
- Colours: Green, gold

Salford Grammar School was a grammar school for boys in Salford, founded in 1904. From 1969, it was known as Salford Grammar Technical School. It was disestablished in 1973, with the coming of comprehensive education.

== History ==
The school was established in December 1903 and opened in 1904 as the Salford Municipal Secondary School for Boys, in the buildings of the Salford Royal Technical Institute (SRTI), now the University of Salford. In its early years, the principal of the SRTI, Herbert B. Knowles, was also the school's headmaster. In 1909, the two were separated, with Knowles continuing as head of the school only. He remained in post until 1913.

In July 1914, the school moved into a new building in Leaf Square, but only a few weeks later the First World War broke out and that building was requisitioned as a military hospital. The school did not return there until March 1920.

The school was renamed as Salford Grammar School in 1932, when it took in the boys of the Central Higher Grade Scholarship School and the pupil teachers from the Pupil Teachers Centre on Victor Street.

In September 1939, the Second World War broke out, and the fear of air raids from Germany led to the school being evacuated to Lancaster, where it shared the buildings and sports fields of the Lancaster Royal Grammar School. However, it returned to Salford when the air raids failed to happen.

In 1945, the headmaster of the school, C. J. Gill, joined HM Inspectorate of Schools and later rose to become Chief Inspector of Teacher Training.

After the war, in the late 1940s, Brian Simon taught at the school for three years. He was struck by the success of the small number of boys who passed an exam to transfer from a secondary modern school and later made much of this in his arguments for comprehensive education.

In 1937, the Salford Education Committee had bought a house on Eccles Old Road called Claremont, formerly the residence of Sir Arthur Percival Heywood, which had large grounds. New school buildings were begun on the Claremont site in 1953, with the main entrance on Chasely Road, and on 12 January 1956 the school moved into them. The new building was officially opened by the Mayor of Salford on 21 March 1956. Demolition of the old school building at Leaf Square began in 1964, and in 1955 the new Salford College of Technology opened on that site.

In the 1950s and 1960s there was a strong tradition of drama in the school, and the school library was well supplied with newly published plays. Notable old boys from the period include Les Blair and Mike Leigh, who worked together on the film Bleak Moments (1971), and the actor Albert Finney.

On 1 September 1969, Salford Grammar School merged with the adjoining Salford Technical High School to form Salford Grammar Technical School on the Claremont site. The new Technical School building became the home of the sixth form, while the lower forms were taught in the older grammar school range.

== Character ==
In 1969, the school was still in many ways modelled on an English public school. There were prefects and a house system, with four houses called Gloucester, Lancaster, Warwick, and York. Some schoolmasters wore academic caps and gowns. There was a school uniform, consisting of a green blazer with the school badge and motto ("Audendum dextra") on the breast pocket, worn with grey trousers, a green and gold striped tie, and a green cap. Boys were also expected to carry a black leather briefcase to school.

== Headmasters ==
- 1903–1913: Herbert Bottomley Knowles
- 1927–1941: Herbert Ben Winfield
- 1927–1941: Josiah G. Altham
- 1942—1945: Cyril James Gill
- 1945–1963: Eric G. Simm

== End of the school ==
In 1973, a system of comprehensive education was adopted in Salford. Salford Grammar Technical School and Pendleton High School for Girls were closed, and two new schools replaced them, Pendleton College (now Salford City College), and Buile Hill High School (now Buile Hill Academy). Special arrangements were needed for charitable trusts connected with the grammar school, which were ultimately wound up. In 2008, the funds in the Frank Rivett Memorial Prize Fund were transferred to the charity Forever Manchester which "supports community activity across Greater Manchester". In 2008, the grammar school building opened in 1956 was demolished.

Five boxes of school records are held by the University of Salford for the period 1903 to 1972, including report books, pupil admission registers, staff registers, Headmaster's reports, and prospectuses.

In 1978, Albert Finney and Harold Riley established an art prize in memory of Eric Simm, headmaster when they were boys at the school.

== Notable former pupils ==
- Les Blair (born 1941), film and theatre director
- John Caine FRSA, author
- Neville Chamberlain (1939–2018), Bishop of Brechin
- Paul Driver (born 1954), former music critic of the Sunday Times
- Albert Finney (1936–2019), actor
- Michael Fidler (1916–1989), Conservative politician and President of the Board of Deputies of British Jews
- David Glencross, Chief executive of the Independent Television Commission
- Sir Sidney Hamburger (1914–2001), Chairman, North Western Regional Health Authority
- Barry Hartle (born 1939), professional soccer player
- Norman Haycocks, Professor of Education at the University of Nottingham from 1946 to 1973
- Mark Hendrick (born 1958), Labour politician
- D. G. Hessayon (born 1928), gardening author
- Peter Hook (born 1956), musician
- Sir Ralph Kohn (1927–2016), pharmacist
- Mike Leigh (born 1943), film director
- Harvey Lisberg (born 1940), talent manager and impresario
- Michael McKinnell (1935–2020), architect
- John Pitt-Brooke, Director-General Secretariat at the Ministry of Defence
- James Porter CBE, Director General of the Commonwealth Institute from 1978 to 1991
- Tom Price (1902–1973), Labour politician
- David Quinn (born 1959), artist
- Harold Riley (1934–2023), artist
- John Maurice Shaftesley (1901–1981), journalist
- Richard Austin Spencer (1892–1956), Conservative politician
- Bernard Sumner (born 1956), musician with Joy Division and New Order
- Lister Tonge (born 1951), clergyman
- Leslie Wagner (born 1943), economist, Vice-Chancellor of Leeds Metropolitan University and the University of North London
- Jim Wallwork (1919–2013), first Allied soldier on French soil on 6 June 1944
- Graham Ward (born 1955), Regius Professor of Divinity at the University of Oxford
- Peter Boyle (born 1954), journalist (ret). Sunday Times Football Editor, Daily Express Asst Sports Editor.
- Graham Nash, musician. Member of the 'Hollies', 'Crosby, Stills and Nash'
