= Leopold Kessler =

Leopold Kessler may refer to:

- Leopold Kessler (Zionist) (1864-1944)
- Leopold Kessler (artist)
