= Barry Hartle =

English footballer (1939–2025)

Personal information
- Full name: Barry Hartle
- Date of birth: 8 August 1939
- Place of birth: Salford, Greater Manchester, England
- Date of death: 29 January 2025 (aged 85)
- Height: 5 ft 8 1/2 in (1.74 m)
- Positions: Outside left; inside left

Senior career*
Years	Team	Apps	(Gls)
1956–1960	Watford	45	(8)
1960–1966	Sheffield United	101	(16)
1966–1967	Carlisle United		
1967–1970	Stockport County		
1970–1971	Oldham Athletic		
1971–1972	Southport		
1972–1974	Macclesfield Town	75	(6)
1974–1975	Buxton		
1975–1976	Witton Albion		
1977	Hyde United	3	(0)
- * Club domestic league appearances and goals

Barry Hartle (8 August 1939 – 29 January 2025) was an English footballer who played as an inside or outside left. Born in Salford, Greater Manchester he made over 300 appearances in the Football League between 1956 and 1971 before dropping into non-league football.

== Career ==
Hartle was spotted by Watford while playing in a local park as a schoolboy at Salford Grammar School and agreed terms as a junior in 1956. Making his league debut two years later in December 1958, Hartle became a key member of Watford's first-team squad, and was part of their side that won promotion from Division Four during their 1959–60 season.

Having impressed in the lower divisions, Hartle was signed by Division Two side Sheffield United for £2,750 in June 1960, but only made three competitive appearances during his first season with the Blades. However, following United's promotion to Division One Hartle began to feature more regularly, although still primarily used when other teammates were unavailable. It wasn't until the 1964–65 season that Hartle established himself in the first-team, playing in all but three of United's competitive fixtures that season.

A year later however, Hartle was sold to Carlisle United in July 1966 for £14,900, representing a large profit on Sheffield United's initial investment. Hartle only remained at Carlisle for just over a season, joining Stockport County in September 1967. From there Hartle moved to Oldham Athletic in June 1970 before, after making just over 300 career league appearances, dropping into Division Four when he signed for Southport in July 1971. His career winding down, Hartle went on to play for Macclesfield Town, Buxton, Witton Albion and Hyde United before retiring in 1977.

== Personal life and death ==
Born in Salford, Greater Manchester, Hartle attended Salford Grammar School. After his retirement from football, Hartle was employed as a postman and then later as a taxi driver. He died on 29 January 2025, at the age of 85.
