= Ivan Greenberg =

English journalist and editor (1896–1966)

- Born: Ivan Marion Greenberg; 8 December 1896; London, England
- Died: 11 March 1966 (aged 69); London, England
- Occupation: Journalist
- Parent(s): L. J. Greenberg; Marion Gates

Ivan Marion Greenberg (8 December 1896 – 11 March 1966) was an English journalist. He served as the editor of The Jewish Chronicle from 1935 to 1946. He was a Revisionist Zionist.

== Early life ==
Ivan Greenberg was born in 1896 in London. His father, L. J. Greenberg, was the editor of The Jewish Chronicle and close to Theodor Herzl; his mother was Marion Gates. During World War I, he served in the Royal Artillery.

== Journalistic career ==
Greenberg worked as a journalist in South Africa and Australasia. He became editorial assistant at The Jewish Chronicle in 1925. He served as its editor from 1935 to 1946, when he was fired by the managing director David F. Kessler. Under his editorial leadership, The JC took a decidedly Zionist stance. Kessler dismissed him on the grounds that he was too divisive, and he was succeeded by John Maurice Shaftesley.

== Political activism ==
Greenberg was a proponent of Vladimir Jabotinsky's Revisionist Zionism. Additionally, he routinely criticised Britain's foreign policy towards Palestine. During the Second World War, he called for European Jews to be allowed to emigrate to Palestine, and he became associated with the Committee for a Jewish Army.

Greenberg translated The Revolt by Menachem Begin into English.

== Death ==
Greenberg died on 11 March 1966 in London.
