= Judah Middleman =

Rabbi Judah Middleman

Personal life
- Born: 1797 or 1798 Lemberg, Galicia, Habsburg Empire
- Died: 1 June 1865 (aged 66–68) United States
- Buried: Machpelah Cemetery, Queens

Religious life
- Religion: Judaism

Judah Benjamin Middleman (Hebrew: יהודה יודל מידדעלמאן, romanized: Yehuda Yudel Middelman; 1797 or 1798 – 1 June 1865) was a Galician-born English and American rabbi and writer.

== Biography ==
Middleman was a native of Lemberg, later settling in Warsaw and then London. There he wrote Netivot Emet, a work written in defense of the traditions of the Talmud against the attacks, in Old Paths, of Alexander McCaul. Only the first part of the Netivot Emet was published, in 1847, along with an English translation by Hebraist Marcus Heinrich Bresslau under the title Paths of Truth; being a Defence of the Talmudical Traditions against the attacks in the "Old Paths," by the Rev. Dr. McCaul.

From England he immigrated to New York in 1848. He was a founder of the city's Beth Hamedrash in 1852, and supplemented his income before Passover as the congregation's matzah baker. After a disagreement with the synagogue's rabbi over the hiring of a shoḥet, Middleman and his followers split from the Beth Hamedrash to form the Kalvarier Synagogue at 15 Pike Street.

== Bibliography ==
- ספר נתיבות אמת: העומד למגן בעד חכמי התלמוד, להראות העמים והשרים, כי ישרים דבריהם, ולא עולתה בם, וכל מהרסיהם לא יצלו להפיל מהתלמוד צרור ארצה, והוא נגד החבור נתיבות עולם, אשר חברו הדאקטר מ׳קאָל להרוס יסודי התלמוד אשר בית ישראל נשען עליהם [Paths of Truth; being a Defence of the Talmudical Traditions against the attacks in the "Old Paths," by the Rev. Dr. McCaul] (in Hebrew and English). Vol. 1. Translated by Bresslau, M. H. London: Sherwood, Gilbert, and Piper. 1847. OCLC 234086189.
