= Abraham Benisch =

English Hebraist, editor, and journalist

- Born: 1811; Drosau, Kingdom of Bohemia
- Died: 31 July 1878 (aged 66–67); Hornsey, London, United Kingdom

Abraham Benisch (Yiddish: אברהם בעניש; 1811 – 31 July 1878, London) was an English Hebraist, editor, and journalist. He wrote numerous works in the domain of Judaism, Biblical studies, biography, and travel, and during a period of nearly forty years contributed weekly articles to the pages of the Jewish Chronicle.

== Biography ==
Benisch was born to Jewish parents at Drosau, Bohemia, in 1811.

He studied surgery in Prague about 1836—while a commentary on Ezekiel which he had written was being published—with a view to preparing himself for a journey to Palestine. Together with his close friends and fellow students Albert Löwy and Moritz Steinschneider, he founded in 1838 the proto-Zionist secret society "Die Einheit". For some years he studied medicine at the University of Vienna, but abandoned the study before proceeding to a degree. He left Austria in 1841 to settle in England, where he devoted himself to Jewish journalism and literature.

His Hebrew learning and his actively displayed devotion to Judaism secured for him a high reputation among the Jews in England. In 1854 he became editor of the Jewish Chronicle, which position he held till 1869, resuming the editorship again from 1875 till the year of his death. His editorial influence was exerted in favor of a moderate orthodoxy. He made quite a feature of the correspondence columns of the paper. Benisch took an active part in communal affairs, and helped to found several learned societies, including the Biblical Institute and its allies, the Syro-Egyptian and the Biblical Chronological Societies. These three were afterward fused into the Society of Biblical Archaeology. He zealously promoted the formation of the Society of Hebrew Literature in 1870, and of the Anglo-Jewish Association in 1871.

Benisch died at Hornsey on 31 July 1878. He left the copyright of the Jewish Chronicle to the Anglo-Jewish Association, which, shortly after his death, sold it to Israel Davis and Sydney Montagu Samuel.

== Partial bibliography ==
- Benisch, A. (1847). Two Lectures on the Life and Writings of Maimonides. London: Wertheim.
- Jewish School and Family Bible. Vol. 1–4. Translated by Benisch, A. London: James Darling and Longman & Co. 1851–1861.
- Benisch, A. (1852). Elementary Hebrew Grammar.
- Benisch, A., ed. (1853). Scripture History. Simply Arranged for the Use of Jewish Children. London: Sophia Joel.
- Petachia of Ratisbon (1856). Travels of Rabbi Petachia of Ratisbon (PDF). Translated by Benisch, A. London: Messrs. Trubner & Co. Archived from the original on 5 October 2018.
- Benisch, A. (1858). The Principal Charges of Dr. M'Caul's Old Paths, as Stated by Mr. Newdegate in the House of Commons, Considered & Answered. London: The Jewish Chronicle.
- Benisch, A. (1863). Bishop Colenso's Objections to the Historical Character of the Pentateuch and the Book of Joshua. London: The Jewish Chronicle.
- The Pentateuch, and the Haftaroth. Vol. 1–5. Translated by Benisch, A. (2nd ed.). Rödelheim: J. Lehrberger & Comp. 1864.
- Benisch, A. (1874). Judaism Surveyed; Being a Sketch of the Rise and Development of Judaism, from Moses to our Days, in a Series of Five Lectures. Longmans, Green & Co.
- Benisch, A. (1878). Judaïsme et Christianisme. Translated by Weill, Alexandre. Paris: E. Dentu Libraire-Éditeur.

Media offices
Preceded by M. H. Bresslau	Editor of The Jewish Chronicle; 12 January 1855 – 2 April 1869	Succeeded by Michael Henry
Preceded by Michael Henry	Editor of The Jewish Chronicle; 18 June 1875 – 21 July 1878	Succeeded by Asher Isaac Myers
