= Sidney Montagu =

Sidney Montagu may refer to:

- Sidney Montagu (MP, died 1644), English member of parliament (MP)
- Sidney Wortley Montagu (1650–1727), British coal-owner and MP
- Sidney Montagu, 11th Duke of Manchester (1929–1985), British hereditary peer

== See also ==
- Sydney Montagu Samuel (1848–1884), English journalist, librettist, financier, and communal worker
