= Jacob de Haas =

British-born Jewish journalist and Zionist leader

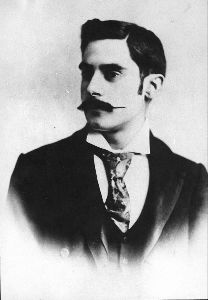
- Born: Jacob de Haas; 13 August 1872; London, England
- Died: 21 March 1937 (aged 64); Mount Sinai Hospital, New York, United States
- Resting place: Beth Olam Cemetery
- Occupations: Journalist, Writer
- Known for: Secretary of the First Zionist Congress
- Spouse: Lillian Eisenberg (m. 1872–1937)
- Children: 2

Signature
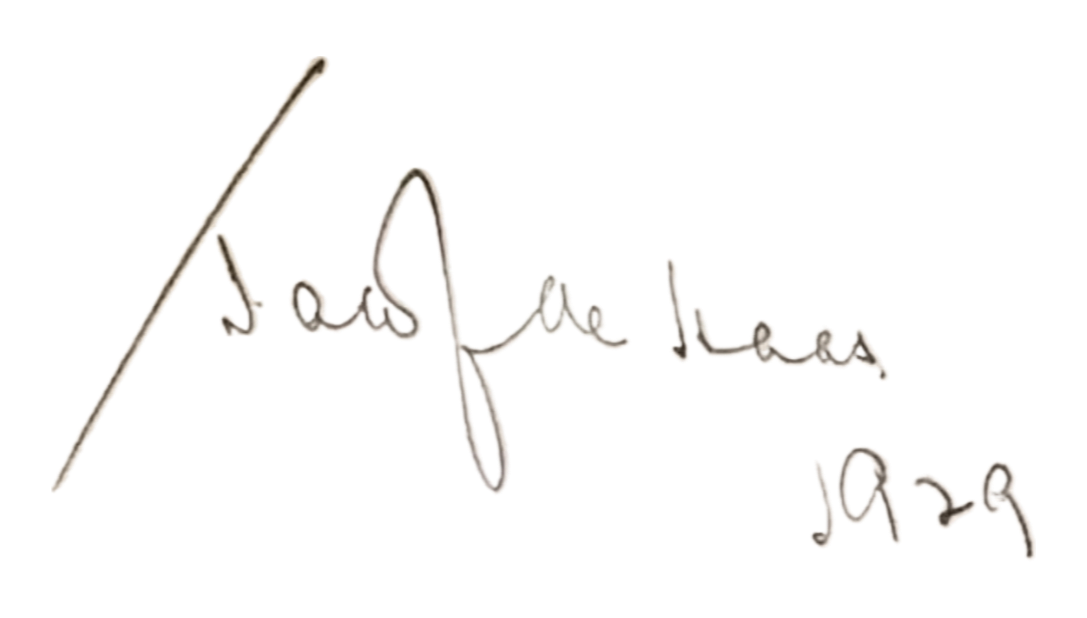

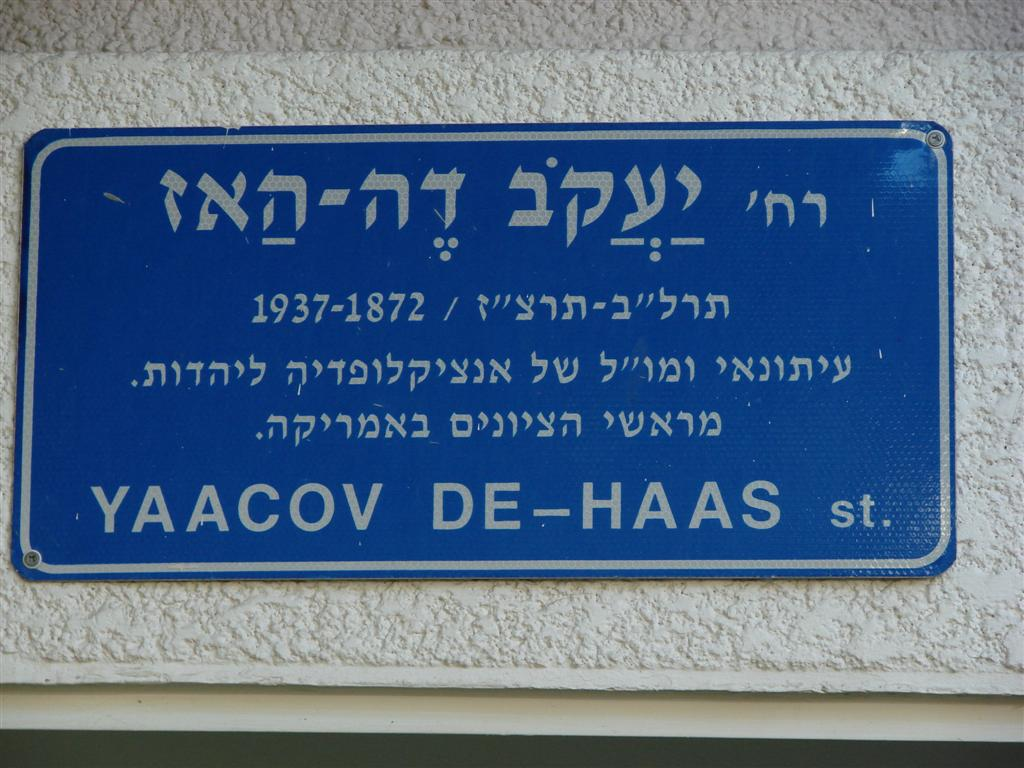
Street sign with his name in Tel Aviv

Jacob de Haas (13 August 1872 – 21 March 1937) was a British-born Jewish journalist and an early leader of the Zionist movement in the United States and England.

De Haas, who at one time served as secretary to Dr. Theodor Herzl, introduced him to the English public. He later wrote Herzl's biography and was widely regarded as an authority on Zionism. He was the secretary of the First Zionist Congress. When England recognized the Zionist movement in 1917 and declared its support for a Jewish state in Palestine, he described it as “a great day in the history of the world.”

== Biography ==
Jacob De Haas was born on 13 August 1872 in London to Dutch Jewish parents Aron and Anna Haarbleek de Haas. He was educated at English and German colleges.

De Haas began his career in journalism as a writer and reporter. Between 1896 and 1900 he edited The Jewish World and subsequently held positions with the Daily Chronicle, Daily News, and Pall Mall Gazette. He also served as a Vienna correspondent for Die Welt, the Zionist weekly founded by Theodor Herzl.

In 1896, he became the first member of Hovevei Zion to encourage the movement to adopt the political Zionist program of Theodor Herzl. At the Third Zionist Congress in 1899, he and L. J. Greenberg were elected as members of the Zionist Organization's Propaganda Committee.

He moved to the United States in 1902. Theodor Herzl had suggested to Richard Gottheil that he hire de Haas as the new secretary of the Federation of American Zionists (FAZ) to replace Stephen Samuel Wise. De Haas assumed the leadership of the fragmented American Zionist movement. One of his best known relationships was his friendship with Louis Brandeis.

In 1927, he published a two-volume biography of Theodor Herzl and was regarded as the most exhaustive study of Theodor Herzl published to that date. Charles Willis Thompson of The New York Times praised the "vigorous and animated biography".

In 1934, he published Palestine: The Last Two Thousand Years. It was highly praised by the Jewish Telegraphic Agency: "This book should prove to be the definite history of Palestine. It should take its place alongside of those authoritative texts which serve as standard books of reference."

In his later years, he moved away from the "general Zionists" to align himself with the Revisionist Zionism movement of Ze'ev Jabotinsky. He served as the movement's representative in the United States.

== Personal life ==
He married Lillian Eisenberg in 1905. They had a son and daughter. He belonged to Congregation Shearith Israel, an Orthodox congregation.

=== Death ===
De Haas died at Mount Sinai Hospital in New York City on 21 March 1937 after a lengthy illness. In accordance with his expressed wishes, a simple funeral service was held at his home at 50 Morningside Dr in Morningside Heights. He was buried at Beth Olam Cemetery in the Cypress Hills section of East New York in Brooklyn.

Rabbi and Zionist leader Stephen Samuel Wise paid tribute to De Haas in a statement, writing that he “won for himself a place of honor and distinction in Zionist history” and that he was one of the “devoted furtherers and upbuilders” of the Zionist movement.

13 years after his death, he was commemorated in Tel Aviv at a ceremony organized by the world executive of Herut. At the gathering, officials announced plans to construct an assembly hall in Israel that would bear his name. They also reported that a group of American Jews had formed to raise funds in support of the project.

== Selected bibliography ==
- Editor of "The Jewish World" (1892–1900), London
- Editor of "The Jewish Advocate" (1908–1918), Boston
- Author of "Theodor Herzl, a biographical study", New York City, 1927. (2 volumes)
- Editor of The Encyclopedia of Jewish Knowledge (1934), New York City and London
- Author of History of Palestine: The Last Two Thousand Years (1934), in New York City
