= The Jewish Chronicle =

London-based Jewish weekly newspaper

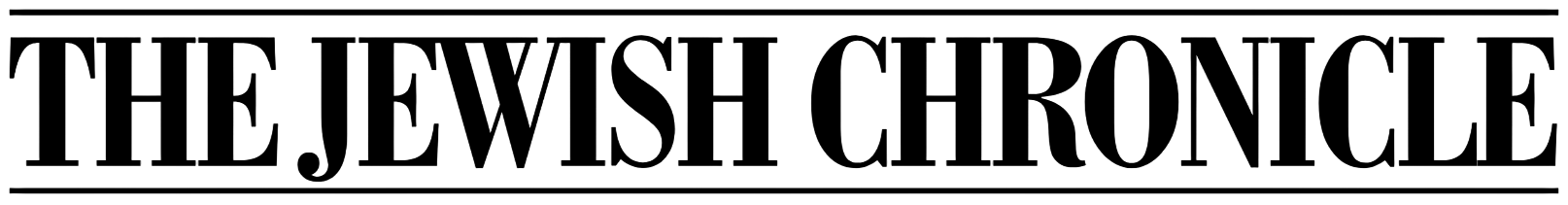

- Front page of The Jewish Chronicle on July 24, 2026
- Type: Weekly newspaper
- Format: Tabloid
- Editor: Daniel Schwammenthal
- Founded: 1841
- Language: English
- Headquarters: London
- Country: England
- Circulation: 10,082 (as of 2024)
- ISSN: 0021-633X
- Website: thejc.com

The Jewish Chronicle (The JC) is a London-based Jewish weekly newspaper. Founded in 1841, it is the oldest continuously published Jewish newspaper in the world. Its editor (since January 2025) is Daniel Schwammenthal.

The newspaper is published every Friday except on Jewish holidays, providing news, opinion pieces, social, cultural and sports reports, as well as editorials and readers' letters.

The average weekly circulation in 2024 was 10,082, of which 4,442 were free copies, down from 32,875 in 2008. In February 2020, it announced plans to merge with the Jewish News but, in April 2020, entered voluntary liquidation and was acquired from the liquidators by a private consortium of political insiders, broadcasters and bankers. The paper's political stance under editor Jake Wallis Simons subsequently moved to the right.

In 2024, The Guardian reported that some of the newspaper's prominent journalists had quit the newspaper due to its purportedly unknown ownership arrangements and publication of fabricated stories.

== History ==
=== 19th century ===
The Jewish Chronicle first appeared on 12 November 1841. Its first editors were David Meldola and Moses Angel. It was issued as a weekly until May 1842, when it was suspended. From October 1844, it resumed as a fortnightly, with Joseph Mitchell as its editor. In 1847, it became again a weekly newspaper. A. Benisch, who became the proprietor and editor in 1855, bequeathed the paper to the Anglo-Jewish Association in 1878, who sold it to its new editor and anti-Zionist Asher I. Myers, Sydney M. Samuel and Israel David.

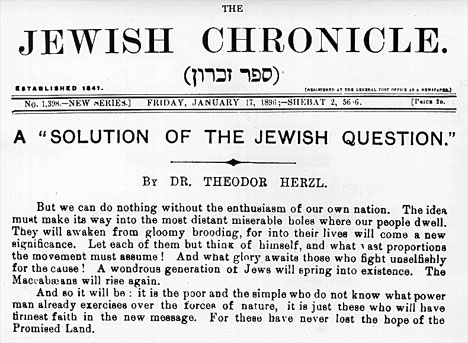
Front page, 17 January 1896, showing article by Theodor Herzl

In 1881, the leaders of the Jewish community in London were being criticised for not campaigning against the pogroms that were taking place in the Russian Empire. Under the leadership of Francis Henry Goldsmid, the pogroms were not mentioned by the newspaper and it was only after the feminist Louisa Goldsmid gave her support following calls to arms by an anonymous writer named "Juriscontalus" and Asher Myers of The Jewish Chronicle that action was taken. Public meetings were then held across the country and Jewish and Christian leaders in Britain spoke out against the atrocities.

=== 20th century ===
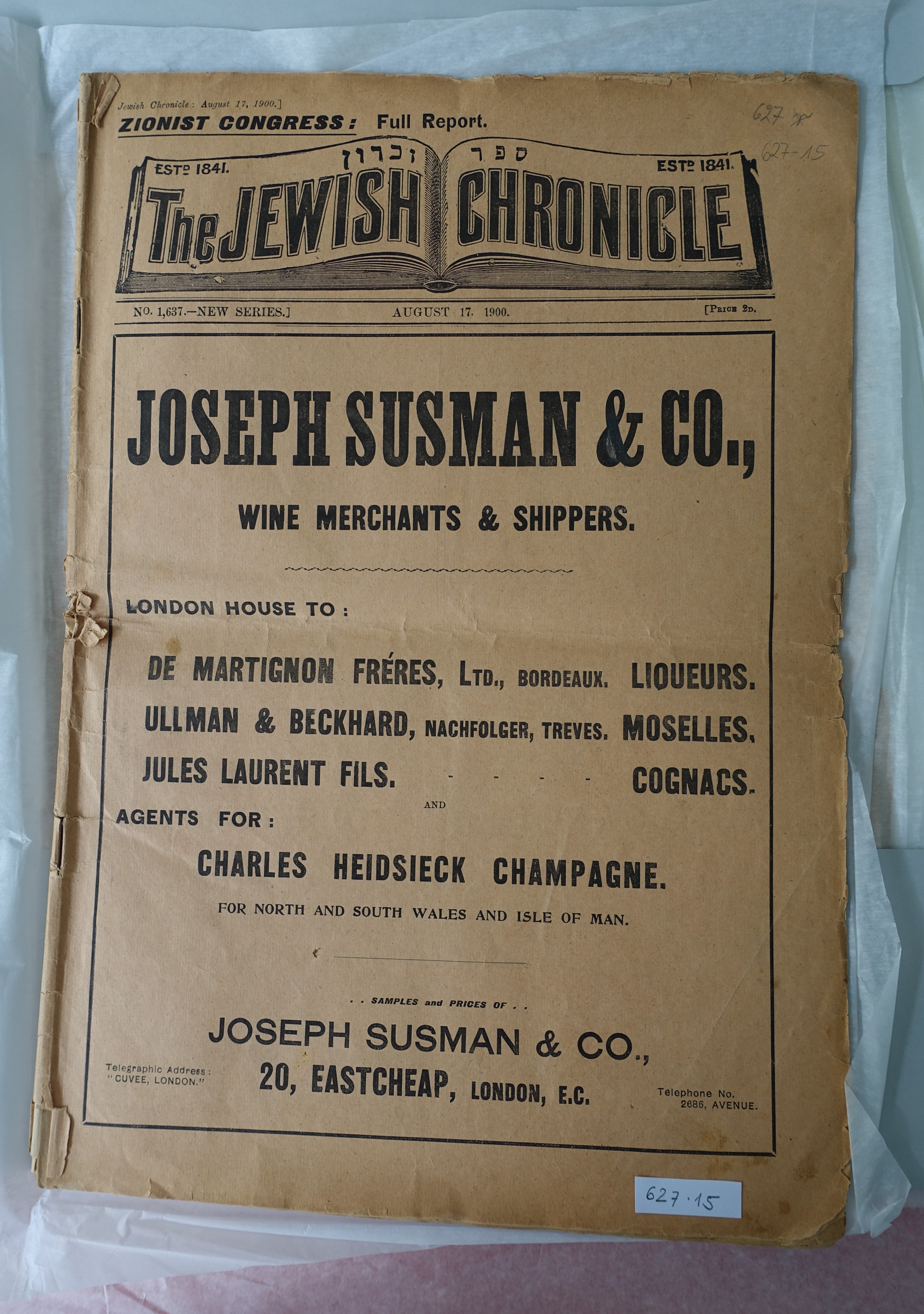
The Jewish Chronicle, 17 August 1900, Zionist Congress: Full Report. No. 1. In the collection of the Jewish Museum of Switzerland.

In December 1906, L. J. Greenberg, a successful advertising agent and English Zionist leader, contacted the Dutch banker Jacobus Kann with the object of buying The Jewish Chronicle to promote Zionism. The same month, Greenberg, together with David Wolffsohn, Joseph Cowen, Jacobus H. Kahn, and Leopold Kessler, bought the shares. Greenberg himself became its editor.

At the time, The Jewish Chronicle gained a near monopoly in the Jewish press, taking over its principal competitors, The Hebrew Observer and The Jewish World. Only in October 1919 did The JC get a strong opposing voice from The Jewish Guardian, the paper of the League of British Jews, which counterbalanced the Zionist views of The JC, until it disappeared in 1931. After Greenberg died the same year, The JC remained moderately pro-Zionist under the leadership of Leopold Kessler.

The weekly newspaper The Jewish World was taken over in 1913. It published articles by various Zionist leaders, as well as early non-Jewish pro-Zionists. In 1934, it was merged with The Jewish Chronicle. After 1948, the paper maintained a pro-Israel attitude.

In the late 1930s, David F. Kessler became managing director to assist his chairman father Leopold Kessler, a moderate Zionist and an associate of Theodor Herzl, known as the father of the State of Israel. After service as a soldier in World War II during which his father had died, Kessler found that the editor, Ivan Greenberg, had taken a right-wing Zionist position highly critical of moderate Zionists and the British policy in Palestine. Kessler, after a struggle with the newspaper's board, sacked Greenberg and installed a moderate editor.

In 1949 the paper, and its wire service, Jewish Chronicle's Feature and News Service (JCFNS; JCNS from 1958), moved to new premises at 32 Furnival St, London EC4. Its editor at the time was J. M. Shaftesley and David F. Kessler (here spelled Koesler) was managing director of The Jewish Chronicle Ltd. By the early 1960s, the Kessler family owned 80% of the newspaper's shares. To safeguard the newspaper's future, Kessler created a foundation ownership structure loosely modelled on the Scott Trust, owners of The Guardian. Kessler was chairman for nearly 30 years, until his death in 1999.

Joseph Finklestone wrote for the paper from 1946 to 1992 in roles including sports editor, chief sub-editor, home news editor, assistant editor, foreign editor, and diplomatic editor.

Geoffrey Paul (né Goldstein) was editor between 1977 and 1990.

=== 21st century ===
Editors of The Jewish Chronicle have included Ned Temko, 1990 to 2005, Jeff Barak (managing editor, 2006), who returned to Israel, and David Rowan, 2006 to 2008, who joined The Observer. Stephen Pollard became editor in November 2008 and editor-at-large in December 2021. He was succeeded as editor by Jake Wallis Simons.

In 2018, the newspaper made a loss of about £1.1 million, following a loss of £460,000 in the previous year. After a number of years of declining circulation and a pension deficit, the reserves of its owners since 1984, the charity The Kessler Foundation, had been exhausted and they planned to introduce revenue and cost measures to reduce losses. According to the editor, the paper had been facing the "real threat" of having to close and the Press Gazette reported its situation as "facing a grave closure threat". Jonathan Goldstein, chairman of the Jewish Leadership Council, organised a consortium of 20 individuals, families and charitable trusts to make donations to The Kessler Foundation to enable its continued support of the newspaper. Alan Jacobs, founder of Jacobs Capital, became the new chairman.

In February 2020, The Jewish Chronicle and Jewish News announced plans to merge, subject to raising the necessary finance to support the merger. Combined, they printed more than 40,000 copies weekly.

On 8 April 2020, The Jewish Chronicle went into liquidation, and both papers announced their intentions to close, due to the COVID lockdown. In April 2020, when the Chronicle faced closure due to financial problems during the Covid pandemic, threats to the paper's survival were met by sadness and some jubilation, with journalists Jonathan Freedland and Hadley Freeman expressing sorrow, and some Labour supporters welcoming its demise.

The Kessler Trust launched a bid to buy the two papers, giving editorial control to the senior staff of the News. However, a £2.5 million counter-offer, supported by the editor, was accepted by the liquidators and trust in what The Guardian described as a brief but messy takeover bid. The consortium was led by Robbie Gibb and included John Woodcock, broadcasters Jonathan Sacerdoti and John Ware and Jonathan Kandel, former Charity Commission chairman William Shawcross, Rabbi Jonathan Hughes, Investec's corporate and institutional banking chief operating officer Robert Swerling, managing partner at EMK Capital Mark Joseph, and Tom Boltman, head of strategic initiatives at Kovrr, with support from anonymous philanthropists.

The consortium said it was running the paper as a community asset, not for profit, and that it would set up a trust to ensure its editorial independence. The News was then taken out of liquidation. However, the identity of other backers in the consortium was unknown, which is highly unusual for a significant UK newspaper. Ware told The Times in September 2024, "I, and some others, repeatedly asked to be told who the new funders were. We were told that wouldn't be possible. I was assured that they were politically mainstream and I trusted those assurances because I trusted who gave them. I didn't want the paper to fold so I allowed my name to be used, having been told it would help. I had zero managerial, financial or editorial influence, control or input, nor ever have had. It was just a name." Due to concerns over the publication's new editorial line under Wallis Simons, Ware stopped writing for The Jewish Chronicle in February 2024, defecting to the Jewish News. Former Chronicle journalist Lee Harpin said in September 2024 that after the takeover he was told the new owners wanted more views "well to the right of the Tory party".

Some sources suggested that the funding may have come from a right-wing American billionaire, Paul Singer, known as a "longtime supporter of hawkish pro-Israel causes", the Likud party, and Benjamin Netanyahu. However, Singer's hedge-fund company has denied the claim. There were also concerns about the potential conflict of interest for Gibb, who sat on the BBC's editorial standards committee while the JC editor had been critical of the BBC's coverage of the Israel-Gaza conflict.

On 15 March 2024, The Jewish Chronicle announced ownership of the paper would transfer to a newly created charitable trust. In September 2024, its editor told The Guardian the ownership transfer had taken place in July 2024, but The Guardian could find no evidence of the transfer in Companies House records, and the Charity Commission said that it had no record of an application from The Jewish Chronicle. However Jonathan Kandel, a former tax lawyer apparently now associated with investment company Starwood Capital Group, was listed at Companies House as a person with significant control, replacing Jonathan Kandel, and a director of Jewish Chronicle Media.

==== Elon Perry controversy ====
In September 2024, The Jewish Chronicle removed several articles from its website that had been criticised by Israeli media as fabrications. The nine reports were written by Elon Perry, a freelancer with no apparent track record as a journalist who had provided a questionable résumé. It was later found out that Elon Perry's real name was Eli Yifrach. One of his articles claimed Israel had intelligence that Hamas leader Yahya Sinwar was planning to smuggle Israeli hostages to Iran and accompany them there. This echoed a talking point previously raised by Israeli Prime Minister Benjamin Netanyahu, and was seen by commentators in Israel as an attempt to drum up support for Netanyahu's unpopular stance in hostage negotiations at the time. IDF spokesperson Daniel Hagari said he was unaware of any intelligence about Sinwar intending to flee to Iran with hostages. A similarly fabricated story about Hamas hostages had earlier been published by German tabloid Bild, which led Israeli security service Shin Bet to launch an investigation and arrest Netanyahu's spokesman, Eli Feldstein, in what became known as the 2024 Israeli secret document leak scandal.

On 15 September 2024, four prominent long-time columnists, David Aaronovitch, David Baddiel, Jonathan Freedland and Hadley Freeman, resigned from the newspaper due to their view that it was making political rather than journalistic judgements, and because of the recent fabricated stories. Sunday Times journalist Josh Glancy had resigned with similar concerns in 2023. Long-serving The Jewish Chronicle journalist Jonathan Freedland wrote that the "latest scandal brings great disgrace on the paper".

==== Coverage of antisemitism during the Gaza war ====
Neve Gordon—in an examination of the appearances of the word 'antisemitism' before and after October 7, 2023 in The Jewish Chronicle, the oldest Jewish newspaper—argues that "the data reveals that TJC has been exaggerating and instrumentalising a Zionist notion of antisemitism to foment moral panic, mobilising the language of trauma and injury to continuously reassert a notion of Jewish victimhood" in support of a "justificatory framework that operates by claiming injury and then using the alleged injury to set in motion a series of oppressive actions against individuals, groups and institutions."

== Editorial positions ==
Under the ownership of Asher Myers and Israel Davis, from 1878, the paper was hostile to Zionism, in line with the official positions of the religious and lay leaders of the community. After Leopold Greenberg had taken over the paper in 1906, it became strongly Zionist, and it was made into "a firm and influential champion of Zionism".

The JC supported the 1917 Balfour Declaration, the publication of which was postponed for a week in order to allow The Jewish Chronicle to publish its opinion in time. After the Declaration was issued, however, the paper became critical of Chaim Weizmann. Greenberg was discontented with the too vague definition of the Zionist goals and wanted him to state clearly that Palestine must be politically Jewish. He wanted to define the "National Home" as a Jewish Commonwealth. Although JC's support of Zionism somewhat decreased after Greenberg's death, it has consistently devoted considerable space to Israel and Zionism.

Under Leopold Greenberg, The Jewish Chronicle was hostile to the Reform and Liberal movements in Britain. Over the years, attention shifted from Orthodoxy in Anglo-Jewry to developments in Progressive Judaism, while becoming more critical of the Orthodox position on halakhic issues.

In 2009, responding to the issue of bias, then-editor Stephen Pollard said "But don't forget who our readership is. They are interested in getting the news about Israel. It's not a biased view. We are presenting one aspect of all the news that is going on. Nobody gets all their news from The JC; we're a complementary news source." In 2014, he apologised on behalf of the paper for running an advertisement by the Disasters Emergency Committee appealing for funds for humanitarian relief for Gaza. He said that he and the paper did not support the appeal and were "entirely supportive" of Operation Protective Edge. He disputed the reported number of civilian casualties and asserted that many were terrorists.

In June 2019, Pollard said, "I think in the last few years there's certainly been a huge need for the journalism that The JC does in especially looking at the anti-Semitism in the Labour party and elsewhere" and "there's such a huge need for our proper crusading independent journalism". Kessler Foundation chair Clive Wolman said: "In the end, we and the JC Trust decided that our primary consideration had to be to preserve the editorial independence of The JC, particularly at a time when its journalists are playing such an important role in exposing antisemitism in British politics." In July 2019, Pollard said that the Jewish community wants "to see [the current Labour Party leadership] removed from any significant role in public life."

In 2024, an unnamed consortium member characterised The Jewish Chronicle's editorial position on Israel as "my country, right or wrong", describing its editor, Wallis Simons, as "behaving like a political activist, not a journalist".

== Reception ==
In September 2014, The Jewish Chronicle published an editorial alleging the Royal Institute of British Architects (RIBA) voted for a ban on Israelis joining the International Union of Architects (IUA) and was in effect a "ban on Jews" and thus antisemitic. The RIBA motion had called for the suspension of the Israeli Association of United Architects over the building of illegal settlements in Palestine. Following a complaint to the Press Complaints Commission, the Chronicle published a letter of response from David Mond, in which he accused the paper of inspiring "its readers to see antisemitism in every critic" of Israel.

In August 2015, dozens of prominent Jewish activists including Miriam Margolyes, Ilan Pappe and Michael Rosen signed an open letter censuring the newspaper for what they accused of being "McCarthyite" "character assassination" of Jeremy Corbyn after the paper published "seven key questions" for Corbyn, including on his ties to Holocaust deniers, featuring his referral of the Hamas and Hezbollah to as "friends".

In December 2019, The Jewish Chronicle published an article by Melanie Phillips, asserting that Islamophobia was a bogus term to provide cover for antisemites. The Board of Deputies of British Jews described its publication as an "error". Editor Stephen Pollard acknowledged that "A number of people within the Jewish community, and friends of the community, have expressed their dismay – and anger – at its content."

When The Jewish Chronicle faced closure due to financial problems in April 2020, former ANC politician and anti-apartheid activist Andrew Feinstein alleged: "The Jewish Chronicle's equating of antisemitism with criticism of Israel has put back the struggle against real AS & all racism by years." Meanwhile, the freelance journalist Mira Bar-Hillel rejoiced at the paper's potential closure as "the best news of the day", accusing it of being a "pathetic rag".

In July 2021, a letter was sent to the British press regulatory body IPSO requesting a standards investigation into The Jewish Chronicle due to what the signatories believed to be "systemic" failings. The nine signatories were mostly linked to the Labour party and had complaints about factually inaccurate reporting upheld by the regulator between 2018 and 2021 or, in three instances, had been libelled by the paper. The complainants alleged that the paper's editorial standards were "shockingly low" and stated that "unless standards there improve there will be more victims, while readers will continue to be misled."

Writing in the Byline Times, Brian Cathcart, Professor of Journalism at Kingston University, argued that IPSO had failed to act on "the collapse of journalism standards at The Jewish Chronicle", which he stated had "been found by the IPSO itself to have breached its code of practice 28 times." He suggested IPSO's failure to act was in part due to the regulator's unwillingness to attract accusations of attempting to silence the paper from the Conservative Party, who benefitted politically from the debate around antisemitism in the Labour Party, in which the paper was a prominent player. He also identified The Jewish Chronicle's owner Robbie Gibb as an obstacle to an IPSO investigation into standards at the paper.

In 2021, members of the Wikipedia community debated The Jewish Chronicle's coverage of left-wing and Muslim groups. It was categorized as a generally reliable source despite concerns about bias.

== Lawsuits and rulings ==
In 1968, The Jewish Chronicle published an article by Labour MP Maurice Edelman saying that another Labour MP, Christopher Mayhew, had made antisemitic comments on a television programme. Mayhew sued for libel, arguing that his comments were anti-Zionist, but not antisemitic. He dropped the case after receiving a public apology from both Edelman and the newspaper in the High Court. A complaint by Mayhew to the Press Council in April 1971, about the editing of a published letter to the editor, was denied.

In 2009, an activist for the International Solidarity Movement (an organisation which campaigns for Palestinian rights) accepted £30,000 damages and an apology from the paper over a letter it had published claiming that he had harboured two suicide bombers.

In August 2017, The Jewish Chronicle published an adjudication by the Independent Press Standards Organisation (IPSO) as a result of a court report that the newspaper had published. The regulator considered the article had breached clause 9 of the Editors' Code of Practice, which relates to the reporting of crime. IPSO ruled that the JC had published details of the family members of the defendant without valid justification.

In August 2019, the British charity Palestinian Relief and Development Fund (Interpal) received an apology, damages of £50,000 and legal costs after The Jewish Chronicle published "false and defamatory allegations", implying that it had links to terrorist activity. On 23 August, the paper published a full apology, together with an article by Ibrahim Hewitt, chair of trustees of Interpal.

In November 2019, The Jewish Chronicle published a ruling by IPSO that it had breached the Editors' Code of Practice in relation to claims in four articles about a Labour Party member published in early 2019. IPSO also expressed significant concerns about the newspaper's failure to answer IPSO's questions and said it considered that the publication's conduct during the investigation was not appropriate. In February 2020, The Jewish Chronicle acknowledged that they had made untrue allegations, for which they apologised, and agreed to pay damages and legal costs.

In September 2020, The Jewish Chronicle published an apology to a councillor about whom the newspaper had printed numerous allegations. The newspaper asserted that the councillor was involved in inviting an activist, who it deemed to be antisemitic, to a Labour Party event; that the councillor ignored "antisemitic statements" made by a fellow activist; and that the councillor had "launched a vicious protest against Luciana Berger in terms suggestive of antisemitism" and had tried to "improperly interfere with a democratic vote at a regional Labour Party meeting". In addition to the apology, The Jewish Chronicle, its editor Stephen Pollard, and senior reporter Lee Harpin paid substantial libel damages and the legal costs.

In March 2021, The Jewish Chronicle printed an article about political activist and journalist Marc Wadsworth which stated that he was involved in a "conspiracy to intimidate, threaten or harass Jewish activists into silence" in an online meeting of the Labour in Exile Network. In reality Wadsworth had not attended the meeting, had issued no such threats and was not a member of the Labour in Exile Network. The newspaper admitted the story was false in all respects, issued an apology, and agreed to pay substantial damages and legal costs. The presiding judge stated "This was a serious mistake for the Jewish Chronicle to have made." Following the libel verdict, the Morning Star printed an extract from Wadsworth's statement, in which he said he was "deeply distressed that The Jewish Chronicle did not check its facts or contact me before its article was written."

In August 2021 The Telegraph said that eight complaints to IPSO about the paper had been upheld, two were not upheld, and two were resolved through mediation in the preceding three years, while Brian Cathcart, for the Byline Times, said the paper had 33 breaches of the Editors Code within a similar timeframe.

In November 2022 The Jewish Chronicle published an opinion column by Zoe Strimpel that included a statement that "the Islamic Republic [of Iran] has repeatedly vowed to wipe Israel and Jews off the face of the Earth". In April 2023 IPSO ruled that this was inaccurate, and hence breached Clause 1 of the Editors' Code of Practice. IPSO ordered The JC to publish a correction, equal in prominence to the original column.

In April 2023, IPSO upheld a complaint on behalf of Rabbi Yisroel Dovid Weiss about whom The Jewish Chronicle twice (online and in print) wrote a claim of Holocaust denial. The claim had initially been made by Associated Press but was retracted in 2007. The Jewish Chronicle knew this in advance of publication. IPSO upheld complaints under Accuracy Clause 1; they considered the newspaper's behaviour "unacceptable" and reported their "significant concerns" to IPSO's Standards department.

IPSO's 2023 annual statement recorded that The Jewish Chronicle had the second equal most breaches of its Editors' Code by all newspapers that year, with four breaches, one less than The Daily Telegraph.

== Chief editors ==
- Rabbi David Mendola and Moses Angel (co-founders and editor 1841–1844)
- Joseph Mitchell (1844–1854)
- Marcus Hyman Bresslau (1854–1855)
- Abraham Benisch (1855–1869)
- Michael Henry (1869–1875)
- Abraham Benisch (1875–1878)
- Asher Isaac Myers (1878–1902)
- Morris Duparc (1902–1907)
- Leopold Greenberg (1907–1931)
- Jack Rich (1931–1935)
- Ivan Greenberg (1935–1946)
- John Maurice Shaftesley (1946–1958)
- William Frankel (1958–1977)
- Geoffrey Paul (1977–1990)
- Ned Temko (1990–2005)
- David Rowan (2006–2008)
- Jeff Barak (managing editor) (2007–2008)
- Stephen Pollard (2008– 2021; editor-at-large 2021– January 2025)
- Jake Wallis Simons (2021– January 2025)
- Daniel Schwammenthal (from January 2025)

== See also ==
- Hamodia
- Jewish Tribune (UK)
- Jewish News

== Bibliography ==
- Cesarani, David (1994). The Jewish Chronicle and Anglo Jewry. Cambridge: Cambridge University Press. ISBN 0-521-43434-3.
