= Hirsch Edelmann =

Russian Jewish author and editor

- Born: 1805; Swislocz, Russian Empire
- Died: 20 November 1858 (aged 52–53); Berlin, Prussia

"Hemdah genuzah", Königsberg, 1856

Hirsch Edelmann (1805 – 20 November 1858) was a Russian Jewish author and editor.

Born in Swislocz, in the Russian Empire (present-day Belarus), he was the son of a rabbinical scholar, and received a good Talmudical education, which he later supplemented by acquainting himself thoroughly with ancient and modern Hebrew literature. In 1839 Edelmann published his first work, "Haggahot u-Bi'urim," notes and commentaries to the "Me'irat 'Enayim" of Nathanson and Etlinger, Wilna, 1839. Five years later he published "'Alim le-Mibḥan," specimens or extracts from his work on difficult passages of the Haggadah in the Talmudim and Midrashim, with an appendix, "Megillat Sefer," on Purim and the Megillah, Danzig, 1844. The following year he published in Königsberg (where, as at Danzig, he had charge of a printing establishment) two critical editions of the Haggadah for Passover, with introductions, annotations, etc. The same year he published, also in Königsberg, the "Siddur Hegyon Leb," which is commonly known as "Landshuth's Prayer-Book." To this work Edelmann also contributed glossaries, emendations, and notes.

Edelmann spent about ten years in England, and was one of the first competent scholars to examine the manuscripts and rare printed books of the Oppenheim collection in the Bodleian Library, Oxford, and to give the outside world some knowledge of their contents. In this work he was assisted by Leopold Dukes; and they jointly edited and published "Ginze Oxford" (with an English translation by Marcus Heymann Breslau, London, 1851).

To this period of Edelmann's activity belong also:

- "Derek Ṭobim," ethical wills of Judah ibn Tibbon and Maimonides, also ancient Arabic and Greek proverbs rendered into Hebrew, with English translation by Bresslau, London, 1852
- "Dibre Ḥefeẓ," extracts from various unprinted works, London, 1853
- "Tehillah la-Yesharim," poem by Moses Ḥayyim Luzzatto from an Oxford manuscript, with preface by Edelmann, London, 1854
- "Ḥemdah Genuzah," unedited manuscripts by early rabbinical authorities, with a literary-historical introduction, Königsberg, 1856.

Edelmann also brought out a valuable critical new edition of Ishtori Haparchi's "Kaftor u-Feraḥ," Berlin, 1851, and wrote "Gedullat Sha'ul," a biography of Rabbi Saul Wahl, the alleged one-day King of Poland, with an appendix, "Nir le-Dawid ule-Zar'o," the genealogy of Denis M. Samuel of London, a descendant of that rabbi, London, 1854.

In 1852 Edelmann settled in Berlin. For three months before his death he was in the insane department of the Charité hospital of that city.
