= Miroslav Toman Sr. =

Czech politician (1935–2023)

Member of the Czech National Council
- In office 7 June 1981 – 22 May 1986

Member of the Federal Assembly of Czechoslovakia
- In office 24 May 1986 – 5 June 1990

Minister of Agriculture of the Czech Socialist Republic
- In office 1981–1983
- Preceded by: Miroslav Petřík
- Succeeded by: Vladislav Třeška

Minister of Agriculture and Food of Czechoslovakia
- In office 1983–1988
- Preceded by: Josef Nágr
- Succeeded by: Jaromír Algayer

Personal details
- Born: Miroslav Toman; 28 May 1935 Strážov, Czechoslovakia
- Died: 21 July 2023 (aged 88) Klatovy District, Czech Republic
- Party: KSČ (until 1990)
- Education: Czech University of Agriculture in Prague; Higher School of Politics
- Occupation: Businessman

Miroslav Toman Sr. (28 May 1935 – 21 July 2023) was a Czech businessman and politician. A member of the Communist Party of Czechoslovakia, he served in the Czech National Council from 1981 to 1986 and the Federal Assembly from 1986 to 1990. He served as Minister of Agriculture of the Czech Socialist Republic from 1981 to 1983 and was Minister of Agriculture and Food of Czechoslovakia from 1983 to 1988.

Toman died in a traffic collision in the Klatovy District on 21 July 2023, at the age of 88.
