= Strážov (Klatovy District) =

- Town
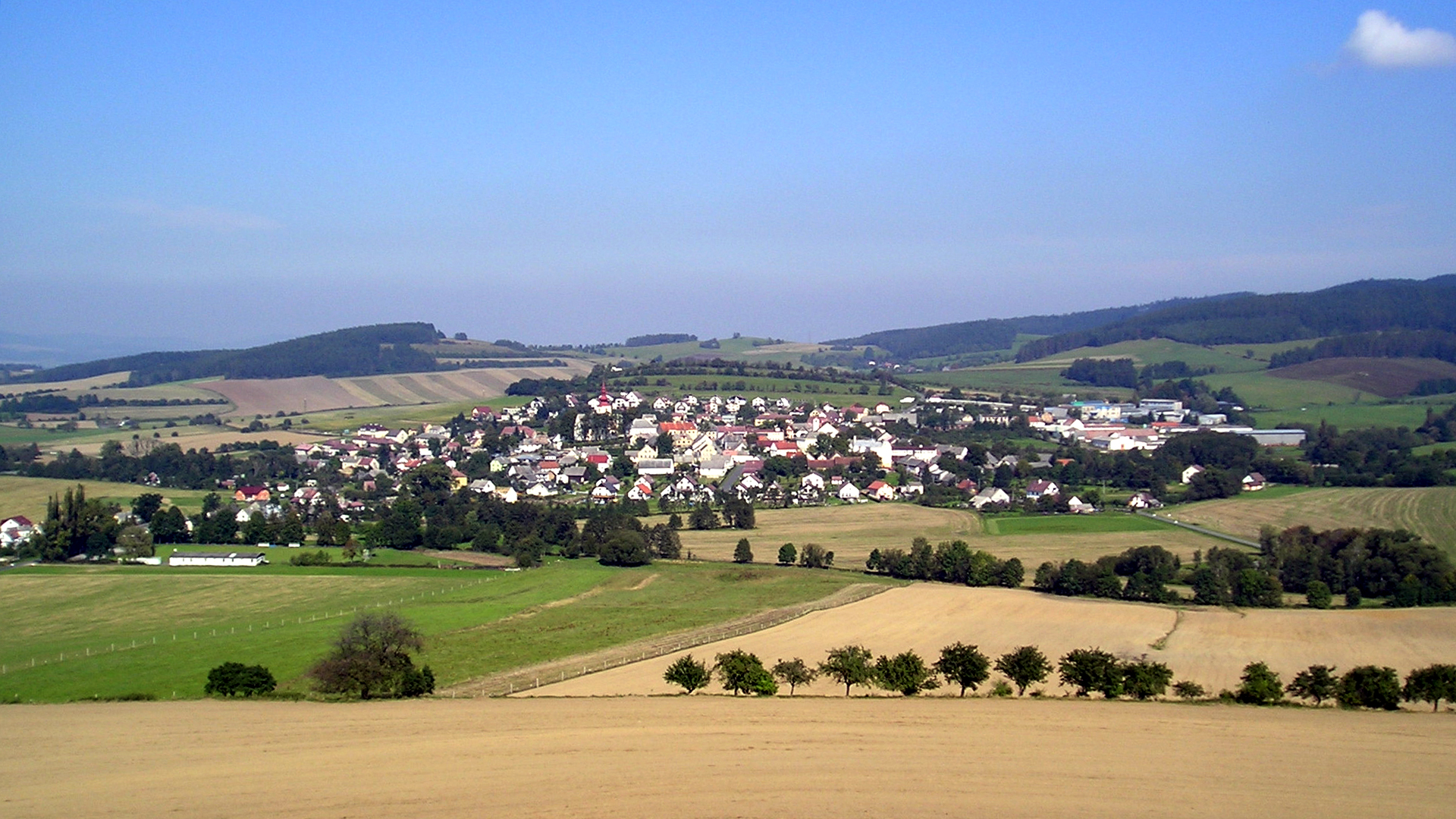
- Panorama of the town

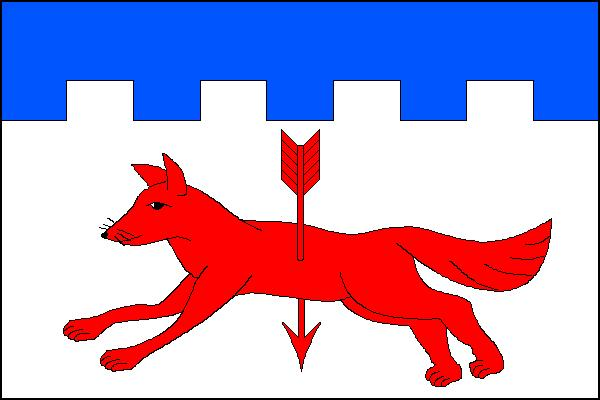
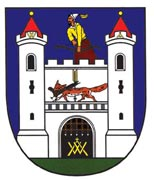
- Flag Coat of arms

- Location in the Czech Republic
- Coordinates: 49°18′4″N 13°14′52″E
- Country: Czech Republic
- Region: Plzeň
- District: Klatovy
- First mentioned: 1352

Government
  - Mayor: Josef Rousek

Area
  - Total: 35.71 km^{2} (13.79 sq mi)
- Elevation: 482 m (1,581 ft)

Population (2026-01-01)
  - Total: 1,374
  - Density: 38.48/km^{2} (99.65/sq mi)
- Time zone: UTC+1 (CET)
  - Summer (DST): UTC+2 (CEST)
- Postal codes: 339 01, 340 21
- Website: mesto.strazov.cz

Strážov (Czech pronunciation: [ˈstraːʒof]; German: Drosau) is a town in Klatovy District in the Plzeň Region of the Czech Republic. It has about 1,400 inhabitants. The historic town centre is well preserved and is protected as an urban monument zone.

== Administrative division ==
Strážov consists of 16 municipal parts (in brackets population according to the 2021 census):

- Strážov (892)
- Božtěšice (24)
- Brtí (45)
- České Hamry (7)
- Horní Němčice (22)
- Javoříčko (6)
- Kněžice (10)
- Krotějov (26)
- Lehom (17)
- Lukavice (52)
- Mladotice (1)
- Opálka (81)
- Rovná (13)
- Splž (15)
- Viteň (72)
- Zahorčice (60)

== Etymology ==
The name of the town is derived from the Czech word stráž (i.e. 'guard') and refers to its original purpose when there was a guarding point of a trade route from Zwiesel to Bohemia.

== Geography ==
Strážov is located about 11 kilometres (7 mi) south of Klatovy and 49 km (30 mi) south of Plzeň. It lies in the Bohemian Forest Foothills. The highest point is at 875 m (2,871 ft) above sea level. The Jelenka Stream flows through the territory.

== History ==
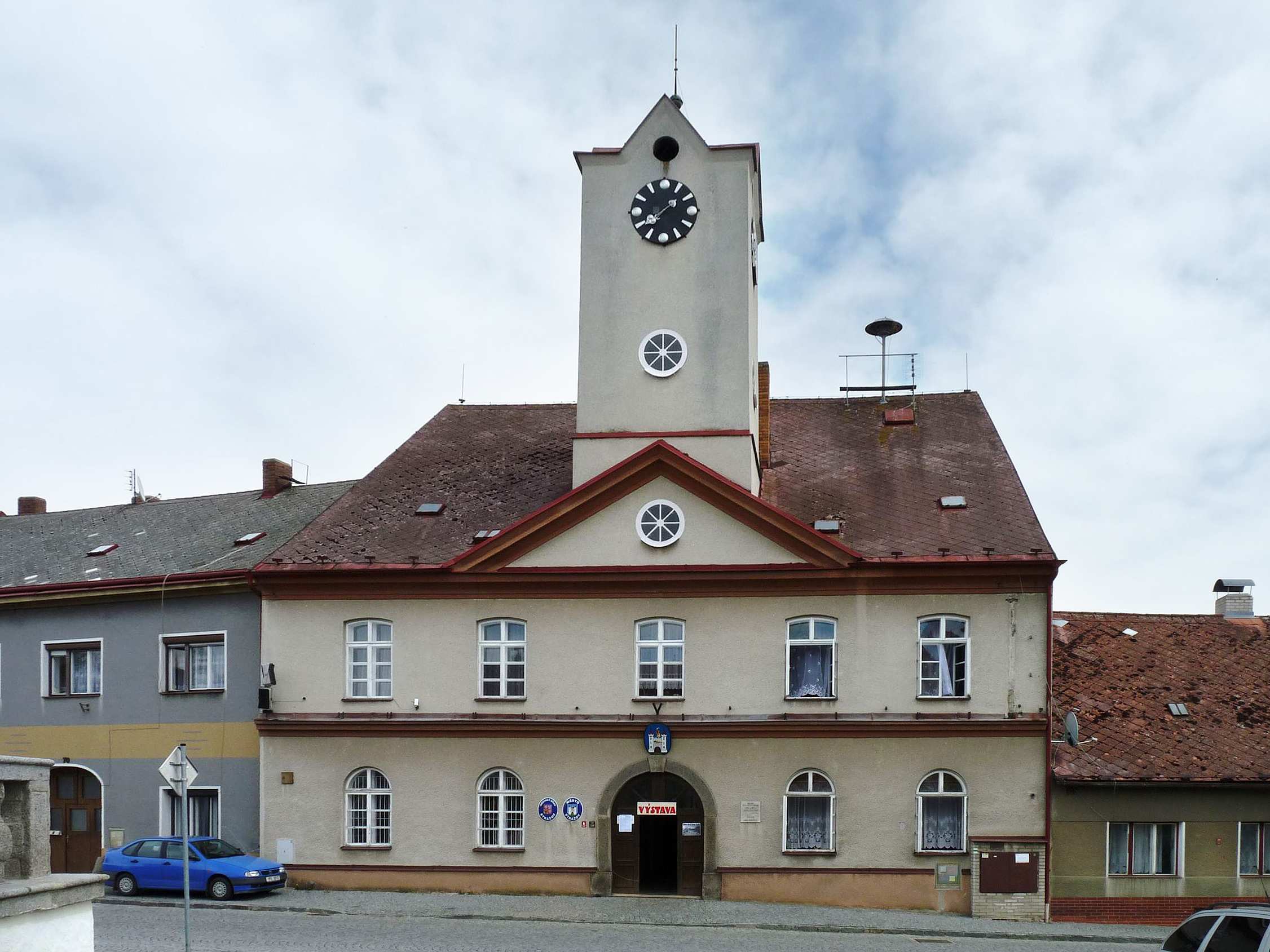
Town hall

The first written mention of Strážov is from 1352. The settlement was probably founded in the middle of the 13th century. Silver and lead began to be mined in the 15th century.

King Louis II of Hungary granted Strážov's town privileges on 24 July 1524, and the right to the fortifications and the coat of arms a year later. Soon after, the mines were depleted. The town was burned during the Thirty Years' War (in 1641) by the Swedish army. Strážov was recovering slowly. The stimulus for its development was mainly the production of lace (first mentioned in 1725) and the establishment of a leather factory.

== Demographics ==
Historical population

Year	Pop.	±%
1869	3,596	—
1880	3,588	−0.2%
1890	3,317	−7.6%
1900	3,225	−2.8%
1910	3,339	+3.5%

Year	Pop.	±%
1921	3,297	−1.3%
1930	2,940	−10.8%
1950	1,838	−37.5%
1961	1,818	−1.1%
1970	1,620	−10.9%

Year	Pop.	±%
1980	1,494	−7.8%
1991	1,343	−10.1%
2001	1,336	−0.5%
2011	1,307	−2.2%
2021	1,343	+2.8%

Source: Censuses

== Transport ==
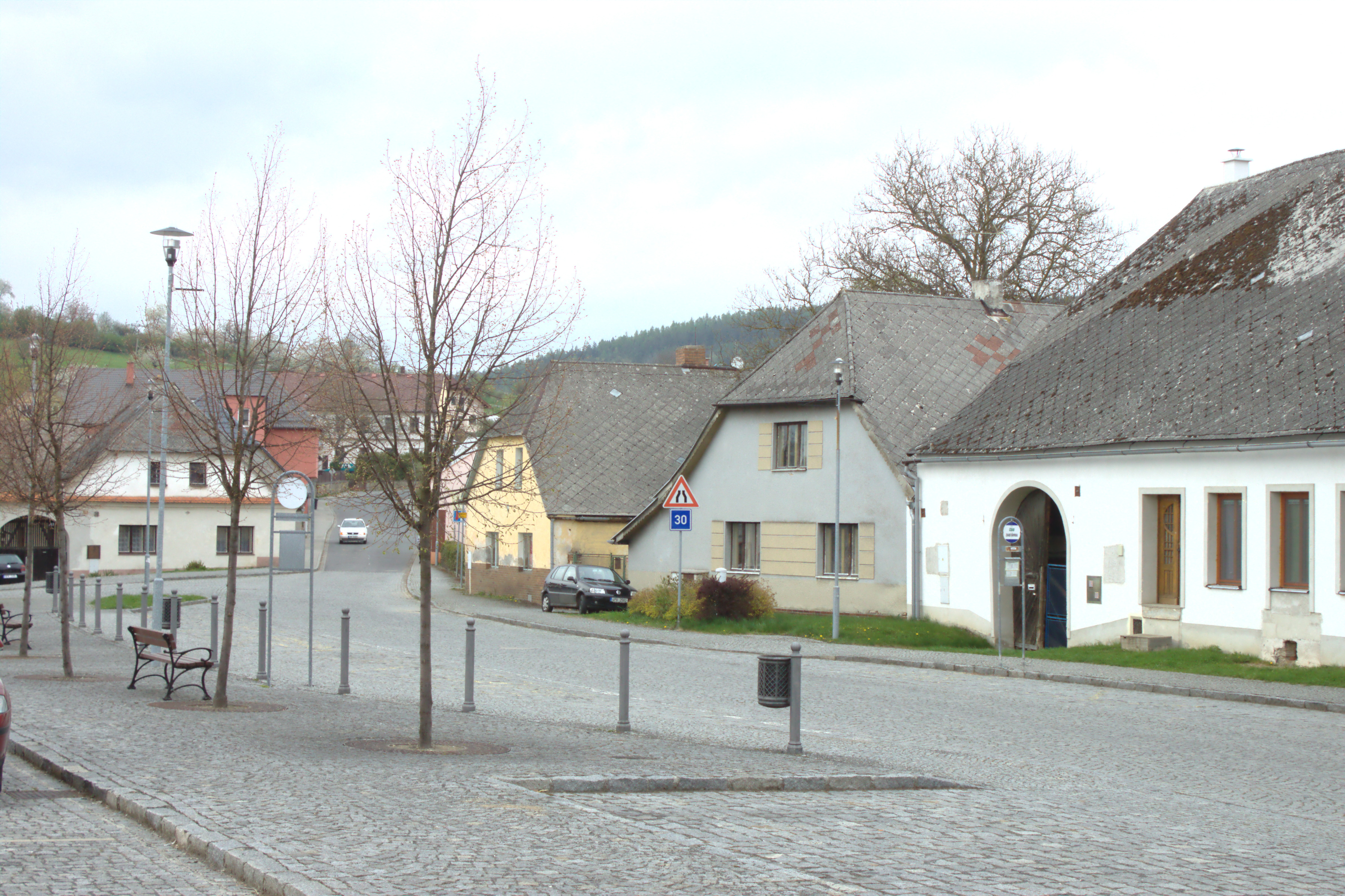
Town square

The railway line Klatovy–Horažďovice briefly crosses the municipal territory, but there is no train station.

== Sights ==
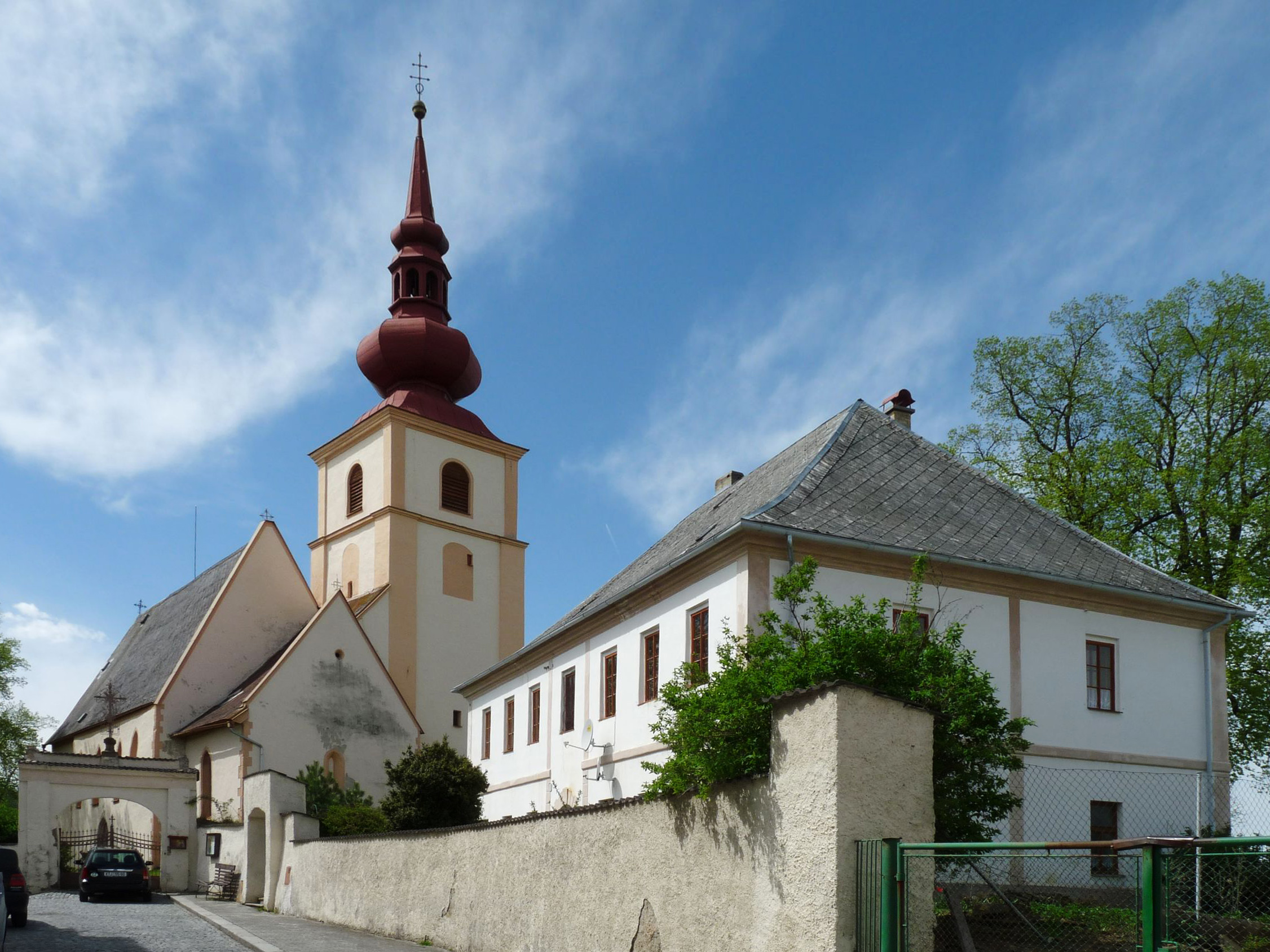
Church of Saint George and the rectory

The historic town centre is protected as an urban monument zone, because it has retained the distinctive character of a foothill town with several valuable buildings in both folk and urban architecture.

The main landmark of the town is the Church of Saint George. First documented in 1384, it was built in the early Gothic style in the 13th century. Modifications were made in the 19th century.

The Opálka Castle is located in the village of Opálka. It was a small medieval Gothic castle (sometimes referred to as a fortress) from the 14th century, rebuilt in the Renaissance style in the mid-16th century. In the mid-18th century, during the Baroque period, it was extended. The Chapel of Saint Anne in the area dates from the first half of the 19th century. Today, the castle is in poor condition and is being repaired.

== Notable people ==
- Abraham Benisch (1811–1878), Hebraist and journalist
- Miroslav Toman Sr. (1935–2023), politician
