= John Caine (playwright) =

British writer

John Caine (born in Salford, Lancashire, England) is an author and playwright who was appointed MBE in 1987 for his services to theatre.

== Biography ==
Caine was educated at Salford Grammar School.

After national service as Lieutenant in Malaya, Caine returned to Manchester where he became writer-in-residence and then Chairman of Trustees of the Salford Playhouse before moving to London.

His first novel A Nest of Singing Birds was awarded the prestigious Litchfield Prize. He has written plays for stage, radio and television, including Mister Lowry staged by the Bristol Old Vic and On the Knocker, a play for radio and winner of an LBC Radio Drama Award.

A journalist and broadcaster, Caine writes for national newspapers, and broadcasts regularly as London correspondent for the Canadian Broadcasting Corporation, Radio Canada.

He is a Fellow of the Royal Society of Arts, and lives in London with his second wife, Carole. He has two children from his first marriage to Irene, Jonathan (b. 1962), who is a music manager and Naomi (b. 1964) who is a freelance writer and journalist.

He also has done commentary for BBC.
