= Asher Isaac Myers =

English journalist and managing editor

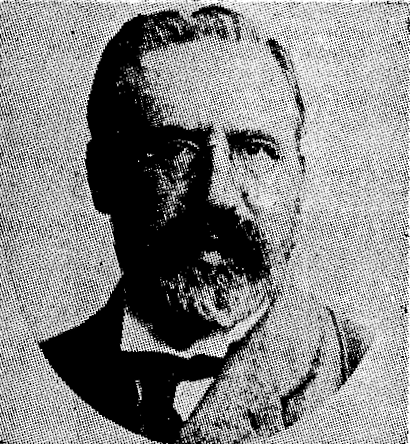
- Born: 4 March 1848; London, United Kingdom
- Died: 11 May 1902 (aged 54); Hampstead, London, United Kingdom
- Resting place: Willesden Jewish Cemetery
- Spouse(s): Alice Cohen (m. 1878; died 1891) Elizabeth Cohen (m. 1894)

Asher Isaac Myers (4 March 1848 – 11 May 1902) was an English journalist and managing editor of The Jewish Chronicle from 1878 until his death.

== Biography ==
Myers was born in London to Caroline (née Aarons) and Isaac Michael Myers, who worked as a synagogue official and bookseller.

After an early training in the clothing business, Myers became in 1868 joint proprietor of The Jewish Record. He left this in the following year to assist Michael Henry with The Jewish Chronicle. In 1874, he published The Jewish Directory, which listed Jewish institutions from across the country along with the individuals associated with them.

On Henry's death he became business manager under Abraham Benisch, who took great interest in his training. Benisch, at his death in 1878, left Myers a part-proprietorship of the paper, and he became joint owner with Israel Davis and Sydney M. Samuel. From that time onward he was acting editor.

Myers was an assistant secretary of the Jewish Board of Guardians, and was also treasurer of the Jewish Workingmen's Club, which he helped to found in 1872. He belonged to several of the committees of the Anglo-Jewish Historical Exhibition, 1887, and was for some years treasurer of the Maccabæans. His house was a centre of Jewish intellectual life in London. Israel Zangwill introduced him to Theodor Herzl in November 1891, and the two remained friends, though Myers remained opposed to Zionism.

Media offices
Preceded by Abraham Benisch	Editor of The Jewish Chronicle; 1878–1902	Succeeded by L. J. Greenberg
