= The Jewish Advocate =

Weekly newspaper

- Type: Weekly newspaper
- Owner: Grand Rabbi Y. A. Korff
- Publisher: Jewish Advocate Publishing Corp
- Editor: Gabe Kahn
- Founded: 1902
- Ceased publication: September 25, 2020
- Language: English
- Headquarters: 15 School Street, Boston, Massachusetts 02108
- Circulation: 40,000 (as of 2019)
- ISSN: 1077-2995
- Website: The Jewish Advocate

The Jewish Advocate was a weekly Jewish newspaper serving Greater Boston and the New England area. It was established in 1902 and, with 118 years of publication, was the oldest continuously-circulated English-language Jewish newspaper in the United States until it suspended publication on September 25, 2020. Before May 28, 1909, it was briefly known as The Jewish Home Journal and then as The Boston Advocate.

== History ==
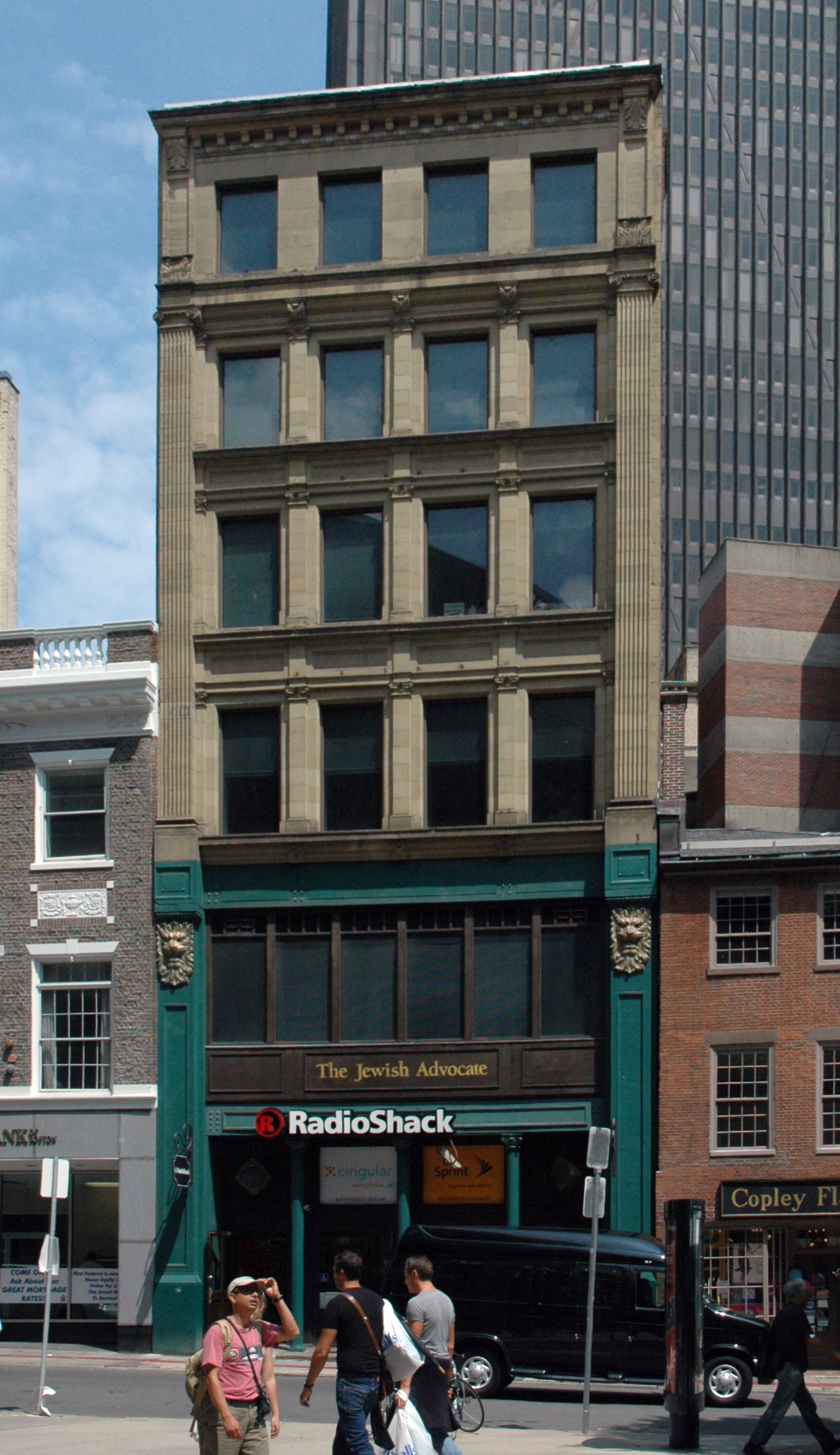
Offices of The Jewish Advocate, 15 School St, Boston, 2007.

The Jewish Advocate was founded in 1902 by Theodor Herzl, a journalist who is considered to be the founder of modern political Zionism. Shortly after founding newspapers in Vienna and Basel, Herzl sent his executive secretary, Jacob de Haas, to Boston to create The Jewish Advocate for the purposes of "inculcat[ing] Judaism into the community and progress[ing] the cause of the re-establishment of the Jewish faith and a Jewish state." Before May 28, 1909, the newspaper was briefly known as The Jewish Home Journal and then as The Boston Advocate. In 1917, when De Haas took the position of executive director of the Zionist Organization of America, he transferred leadership of the newspaper to Alexander Brin.

The newspaper operated out of the former Boston Post building in downtown Boston where the office remains located. The Jewish Advocate remains an active 501(c)3 not-for-profit organization.

In the September 25, 2020 issue, The Jewish Advocate announced it would be "going on hiatus" (but keep the organization and website active), citing decreasing advertising revenue which had "virtually disappeared" due to the COVID-19 pandemic and lagging support from communal organizations and the federation. In the announcement, they also said they were developing plans to launch a digital version of the publication, and left open the possibility of resuming publication. The newspaper also reached an agreement with NewsBank to add the complete archives of The Jewish Advocate to their digital catalogue and make it available to the public through The Jewish Advocate website.

== Publishers of The Jewish Advocate ==
- Jacob de Haas (1902–1917)
- Alexander Brin (1917–1980)
- Joseph G. Brin (co-publisher, 1917–1952)
- Joseph G. Weisberg (1980–1984)
- Bernard J. Hyatt (1984–1990)
- Grand Rabbi Y. A. Korff (1990-2020)

== A selection of historic front pages of The Jewish Advocate ==
Issue of July 9, 1909 honoring Theodor Herzl

Issue of February 9, 1912 on the Jewish Settlement of Boston

Issue of January 31, 1933 reporting Hitler named Chancellor of Germany

Issue of May 20, 1948 reporting on the founding of The State of Israel

Issue of March 19, 1953 reporting on German ratification of the Israel pact and payment of reparations

A recent front page
