= L. J. Greenberg =

British journalist (1861–1931)

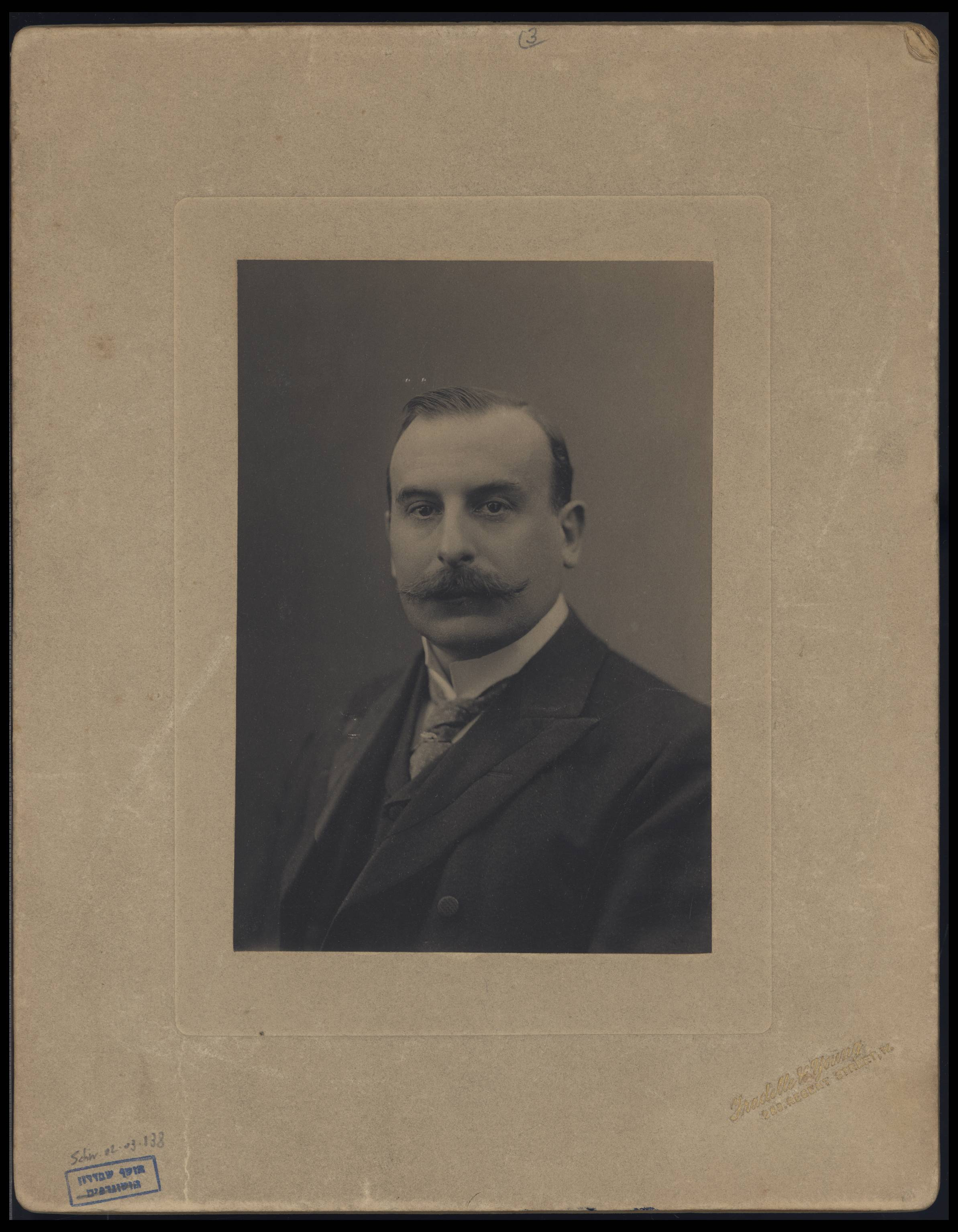
- Born: 1861; Birmingham, U.K.
- Died: 1931 (aged 69–70)
- Resting place: Kibbutz Degania, Israel
- Occupation: Journalist
- Children: Ivan Greenberg

L. J. Greenberg, born Leopold Jacob Greenberg (1861–1931), was a British journalist. He had become an energetic promoter of Zionism in England by the Third Zionist Congress in 1899, at which he and Jacob de Haas were elected as members of the ZO's Propaganda Committee. His frequent dialectical debates were conducted as editor of The Jewish Chronicle, the leading paper in Britain for the Jewish community. Greenberg called for decency and humanity towards World Jewry.

== Early Zionism ==
He was born in Birmingham in 1861, the son of Simeon Greenberg, a successful jewellery manufacturer. He was educated in London, at a private Jewish school in Maida Vale, then at University College School. Greenberg made friends with many political figures in Great Britain at the turn of the twentieth century. This enabled him to partly fulfill the wishes and dreams of Theodor Herzl, whom he invited to his home in London. His primary aim was to gain Zionism acceptance by British Jews; in 1900, 99% of the community were indifferent to the idea. But Greenberg, who had edited a monthly magazine in the 1890s called Young Israel, disseminated the philosophy.

== The Jewish Chronicle ==
Greenberg stressed the need for a platform. So, when he heard that The Jewish Chronicle was being sold, he proposed to Herzl that the World Zionist Organization acquire the weekly. However, when the proposal was put before the 1903 congress, it was rejected, so the idea lapsed. Then, in 1904, Greenberg decided to float a company to finance the purchase. He found four Jewish backers, including Leopold Kessler, a mining engineer who had recently returned from South Africa with considerable substance. Greenberg became the Chronicle's editor in 1907, a position he held the rest of his life. Greenberg became the new proprietor and editor. He remained a friend and powerful ally of Dr Moses Gaster, known as the haham, or Chief Rabbi of Sephardic Jews in Britain. But in 1914, his closest associate was Joseph Cowen, a manufacturer of shirts, and president of English Zionist Federation (EZF). But Greenberg was an essentially conservative English figure, who rejected the wider radicalism latterly associated during the war with Zionism. Their group was known as the 'London Politicals'. Greenberg remained instrumental in manipulating and 'fixing' contacts. They expressed a desire to preserve the cultural and spiritual heritage of the religion, the synagogues and the Torah. To radicals it was an impassive agenda; but their resistance to the spread of nationalistic ideals would lead to the war against Fascism. On 14 August 1914, The Jewish Chronicle published Greenberg's faute de mieux "England has been all she could be to the Jews; the Jews will be all they can be to England." Israel Zangwill, Head of ITO (International Territorialist Organization), also feared Russian Pogroms and the treatment meted out to the 'vile Jew'. Greenberg concurred that the British government had a duty to pressurize the Tsarist regime to desist from the murder of civilians. But the government's immediate concerns prevented intervention on behalf of Austro-Jews or Russian Jews: intellectual opposition continued.

== Political persuasion ==
The lawyer Greenberg chose to draw up the Articles of Association of The Jewish Chronicle was a Liberal Member of Parliament (MP) by the name of David Lloyd George. They had established a good relationship long before he became prime minister.

Another close acquaintance of his and Liberal Unionist MP was Joseph Chamberlain. Chamberlain later rose to become Secretary for the Colonies in 1902, and Greenberg felt he could approach him with the request that he give the Jewish people a homeland, somewhere in the British Empire, preferably in what is now Israel. But that territory was a Turkish province, so Chamberlain was unable to help. But he did offer the Jewish people Sinai in 1901, as that was distinct from Egypt. The heat and lack of water made it impractical to support a large population, so the offer fell through. Then, in 1903, Chamberlain offered Greenberg the colony of Uganda as a Jewish home. That had a better climate, but the Russian Zionists all rejected it saying with great force, "Israel or nothing" at the 1904 World Jewish Congress in Basel. The Western concept of Zionism, headed by Herzl, was foreign to Russian Jewry.

== First World War ==
After Herzl's death, the Zionist movement languished, with only a small bureau of Herzl's followers remaining in Vienna. On the other side of the English Channel, Greenberg edited The Jewish Chronicle and took vital steps to secure its future as the sole voice of the British Jewish community, assisted by Jacobus Kann, Joseph Cowen, and Leopold Kessler.

Prior to 1914, The Jewish Chronicle had been unrestrained in its criticism of the Russian Empire, because of the ill-treatment the Jews had endured. Greenberg even expressed the view in an editorial that Britain should join Austria and Germany in a war against Russia. But once Germany violated Belgian neutrality, Greenberg had to abandon Russian Jewry, and claimed that Britain should join Russia in a war against Austria/Germany. The Jewish Chronicle placed a placard outside its London offices reiterating that "England has been all she could be to the Jews; the Jews will be all they can to England." In a similar vein, on 4 September 1914, the newspaper argued "From the Russian people Jews have never experienced anything but the deepest sympathy, and with the Russian people they have ever felt on mutually agreeable terms." Early in 1915, Greenberg and Zangwill lobbied the Foreign Office vigorously opposing Weizmann's World View of a Zionist homeland. More for the fears of failure, and bourgeois retrenchment they calculated the friction with Arab tensions would produce years of conflict. Greenberg disliked the communality of global Judaism. "The Zionist Organization was foreign and was almost entirely controlled from alien-enemy countries." Greenberg expressed the fears of the middle-classes of the destructive influence of militarism. The path according to Greenberg was construed to be assimilationist.

In 1916, America remained neutral. Britain was virtually exhausted. A new front had to be opened. The Allies first decided to attack Turkey, but that operation was a disaster. Then the British decided they would invade the Turkish colonies and promise the Arabs home rule. Col. T. E. Lawrence played a key part and the British used Egypt as their base to invade Iraq, Syria and Palestine, Palestine being put in the trusted hands of General Edmund Allenby. Still the Americans were neutral. While in Russia, there had been a revolution that had removed the hated Czar and seen Lenin and his Bolsheviks take control. American opinion turned against Britain, and the Americans were even considering entering the war on the side of Germany.

At this point, Weizmann made an interesting discovery: he found it was possible to extract acetate, needed to produce dynamite, from chestnuts. As the British war effort was almost at a standstill for the lack of acetate, Weizmann's discovery assumed capital importance. The Prime Minister, David Lloyd George, is said to have offered Weizmann anything to show his gratitude. According to legend, Weizmann is said to have replied: "All I want is a homeland for my people". Greenberg, at the same time, was asked: "What can we do to bring American opinion back to supporting Britain?". Greenberg answered: "Give the Jewish people the homeland they have been dreaming of for 2,000 years!". They also asked Greenberg what to do to win back Russian opinion and got the same reply.

Greenberg was present at an important meeting with Sir Mark Sykes on Sunday 28 January 1917, when the government unequivocally backed military action. Just as Allenby's army set out from Cairo to conquer Palestine, the British Government issued a statement by the Foreign Secretary, Arthur Balfour, offering a Jewish national home in Palestine. After the Balfour Declaration of 1917, Greenberg still kept on sniping at Weizmann, writing, for example, that Weizmann should have demanded "a Jewish state" rather than a mere "national home" and complaining that Palestine meant "both sides of the Jordan river". That row only ended when Greenberg died in 1931. Greenberg did not live to see the declaration of independent Israel. Greenberg had long subscribed to the intellectual Zionist Theory that Jews were naturally homeless people, perpetually in search of salvation. This came in the form of Britain's promise of assistance, but anti-Zionist moderates suffered from the different parameters to the revolutionaries. Lucien Wolf and the Conjoint Committee had tried to limit damage to their cause, but a statement in The Times of 24 May 1917 revealed the extent of the split in Jewry about Zionist ambitions. Lord Walter Rothschild and Zionist leader, Chaim Weizmann quickly issued rebuttals, that did harm to The Jewish Chronicle's claim to be a voice for Anglo-Jewry. Greenberg remained a moderating influence, but the Great War changed forever relations within British Jewry. Jibes that he was adopting an English-style manifesto commitment were designs upon integrity. The public debate amongst obsessive secrecy crystallized nationalism, militarism, and the launch of a regiment abroad.

== Delayed burial ==
Greenberg had expressed the wish that he should be cremated and his remains buried, without any religious ceremony, near Mount Scopus in Palestine. The casket containing his ashes arrived in Haifa in November 1931, but the Orthodox rabbinate in Jerusalem insisted that since Jewish law prohibits cremation, it could not be buried in consecrated ground. Letters flew back and forth between London and Palestine as his son Ivan tried to resolve the impasse. In January 1932, Joe Linton, one of Weizmann's aides, suggested burying the casket in Herbert Bentwich's private garden near Mount Scopus. This would have been a nice irony since the two men had loathed one another. In any event, this solution was over-ruled by the rabbinate. By May 1932, the casket was still in the customs office in Haifa, and officials threatened to throw it out if something was not done about it. Eventually, through the combined efforts of Moshe Sharett (later Foreign Minister and Prime Minister of Israel) and Chaim Arlosoroff, both high-ranking officials in the Jewish Agency, a resting place for Greenberg's remains was found at Kibbutz Degania by the shore of the Sea of Galilee.

== Bibliography ==
=== Manuscripts ===
- Leonard Stein Papers, New Bodleian Library, Oxford University
- Lucien Wolf Papers, Yivo Institute, New York City and Central Zionist Archive, Israel
- Israel Zangwill Papers, Central Zionist Archive, Israel

=== Newspapers ===
- The Jewish Chronicle, British Newspaper Archive

=== Books ===
- Cesarani, David (1994). The Jewish Chronicle and Anglo-Jewry 1841–1991. Cambridge: Cambridge University Press. ISBN 0-521-43434-3.
- Weizmann, Chaim (1949). Trial and Error, the Autobiography of Chaim Weizmann. First edition. New York: Harper and Brothers. ASIN B000P3VU1A. OCLC 512638.

Media offices
Preceded by Asher Myers	Editor of The Jewish Chronicle; 1907–1931	Succeeded by William Frankel
