= Ralph Kohn =

British medical scientist (1927–2016)

Sir Ralph Kohn FRS, FMedSci, FBPhS
- Born: 9 December 1927; Leipzig, Saxony, Germany
- Died: 11 November 2016 (aged 88); London, England, United Kingdom
- Resting place: Willesden United Synagogue Cemetery
- Education: University of Manchester (PhD)
- Children: 3 daughters
- Website: www.ralphkohn.com

Sir Ralph Kohn (9 December 1927 – 11 November 2016) was a British medical scientist, recipient of the Queen's Award for Export Achievement for his work in the pharmaceutical industry.

== Early life ==
Ralph Kohn was born in Leipzig on 9 December 1927 into a family of Orthodox Jews. His father, Marcus Kohn, ran a successful textile business, and the family occupied a large, comfortable house in the city centre.

In 1933, Marcus Kohn, alarmed at the rise of Nazi anti-Semitism, moved his family to Amsterdam. They remained there for seven years until 14 May 1940, the day the Germans entered the city, when they fled the city on the Bodegraven - the last boat to leave Amsterdam - only a few hours before German troops reached the city. They arrived in Liverpool after a traumatic and uncomfortable seven days at sea, destitute and unable to speak English, with only the clothes they were wearing.

They settled in Salford, where Kohn's father set to work to build a new textiles business.

== Education ==
Kohn attended Salford Grammar School. A star pupil, he wanted to study medicine, but almost all of the places in medical school were reserved for ex-servicemen. Instead, excited by the new drug developments of the 1940s and early 1950s, he decided to read Pharmacology, for which he won a scholarship to the University of Manchester. After receiving the degrees of BSc and MSc, he stayed on to take a PhD.

== Career and research ==
After completing his PhD, Kohn pursued post-doctoral studies in Rome, at the Istituto Superior di Sanita. There, he undertook three years of research into diabetes with the Nobel prizewinner Sir Ernst Chain, the co-discoverer of penicillin, and Professor Daniel Bovet, who would win the 1957 Nobel Prize in Physiology or Medicine. He published several joint papers with both men, then spent a further year as a post-doctoral fellow at the Albert Einstein College of Medicine in New York with the pharmacologist Alfred Gilman.

In 1958, Kohn returned to Britain to take up a position as head of exploratory pharmacology in the research and development division of Smith, Kline & French. He was instrumental in brokering Smith Kline's involvement in the development of phenothiazines (used in various antipsychotic and antihistamine drugs), and in cephalosporin antibiotics. After seven years, he became managing director of Robopharm, a company active in biological products, where he stayed for five years.

In 1969, Kohn set up his own company, Advisory Service (Clinical and General), the first independent research company in Britain to specialise in the clinical assessment of new drugs. Its launch was an important development for the pharmaceutical industry, since the unbiased nature of its research meant that its drug assessments would be carried out to the highest standards and could be relied on without question by the most stringent regulatory authorities, including the UK's Medicines Control Agency and the USA's Food and Drug Administration.

The company flourished, and in 1990 Kohn received the Queen's Award for Export Achievement.

== Music and art ==
Throughout his time as a scientist and businessman, Kohn pursued a parallel passion for music. He had begun his musical studies in Amsterdam with the violin, trained by a member of the Concertgebouw Orchestra.

In Rome he switched to singing, training as a bel canto baritone under Manlio Marcantoni, who introduced him to the great operatic tenor Beniamino Gigli.

In New York, Kohn continued his training under Charles Wadsworth, then in London under Helen Isepp, Otakar Kraus and Derek Hammond-Stroud.

"I didn't know if I was good enough to get to the top of the tree in music," Kohn once said. "I thought that medicine looked like a safer bet." Although he never went professional, Kohn made a public debut at the Wigmore Hall in his late thirties. Subsequently he gave performances in other major concert venues.

He recorded 18 CDs, mostly of lieder, including song cycles by Schubert, Schumann, Beethoven and Mahler, as well as Italian Baroque love songs, and arias from cantatas by Kohn's beloved J.S. Bach, accompanied by leading British pianists such as Graham Johnson and Roger Vignoles. He also made orchestral recordings with the English Chamber Orchestra.

Kohn took an active role in musical administration, initiating the Wigmore Hall International Song Competition and serving on the board of curators of the Bach-Archiv in Leipzig.

== Awards and honours ==
Kohn was a fellow of the Royal Society of Medicine and of the Academy of Medical Sciences, an honorary fellow of the British Pharmacological Society and of the Royal College of Physicians, and an honorary doctor of Science of the University of Buckingham. In 2006 he was elected an honorary fellow of the Royal Society. In November 2008, he delivered the Bynum Tudor Lecture at Kellogg College, Oxford.

He was a fellow of the Royal Academy of Music, and an honorary doctor of Music of the Universities of Manchester and London. He was a trustee of the Wigmore Hall and honorary trustee of the Monteverdi Choir and Orchestra. In 2011 he was awarded the Medal of Honour of the City of Leipzig for his contribution to promoting Bach scholarship and performance, and in 2014 the Order of Merit of the Federal Republic of Germany.

He was knighted in the 2010 New Year Honours for services to science, music and charity.

== Personal life ==
Kohn married Zahava Kanarek in 1963 in Amsterdam. She was a survivor of the Bergen-Belsen concentration camp, and, in later years, talked of her family's experiences of the Holocaust to school children around the United Kingdom to promote tolerance and understanding. The couple had three daughters: Hephzibah, Michelle, and Maxine.

Kohn's Jewish heritage was important to him, he put on tefillin daily and until the end of his life he made a point of meeting an eminent London rabbi twice a week to study the Talmud.

In 2004, he was a guest on Sue Lawley's BBC Radio 4 radio programme, Desert Island Discs.

In 2015, Kohn published a memoir, Recital of a Lifetime; the book came with a CD of his favourite recordings.

Kohn died at his home in London on 11 November 2016, aged 88.
