= Leopold Kessler (artist) =

Leopold Kessler (Artist) - (1976) modern artist born in Munich. In his artworks he is exploring limit between public and private space. He is making small interventions in space. They are sometimes hard to notice but very accurate and site-specific. He lives and works in Vienna

== Early life ==
In 2003 he graduated Academy of Fine Arts in Munich and in 2004 Academy of Fine Arts in Vienna.

== Art ==
Solo exhibitions

2008

Motorenhalle - Zentrum f. zeitgenössische Kunst, Dresden

Malmö Konsthall, Malmö

2007

Red Sea Star, Lombard Freid Projects, New York City
Perforation Kal. 10mm, Secession, Wien
Galerie Andreas Huber, Wien

2006

Graz, Neue Galerie am Landesmuseum Joanneum
Interventionen 02-05, Galerie der Stadt Schwaz, Schwaz

2005

transportable works, Lombard Freid Projects, New York City
O, kunstbuero, Vienna

2004

untitled, Thomas K. Lang Gallery, Webster University, Vienna

2003

synchronization, offspace, Vienna
privatisiert, Galerie Corentin Hamel, Paris

Group exhibitions

2008

Biennale Cuvee, OK Center, Linz
FIKTION. NARRATION. STRUKTUR (cur. by Andreas Huber ), Artnews Projects Berlin
Moralische Fantasien - Kunst und Klima, (cur. by Dorothee Messmer u. Raimar Stange), Kunstmuseum Thurgau
The New World, (cur. by Vlado Velkov), Artnews Projects Berlin

2007

Sharjah Biennale 8, Sharjah, Vereinigte Arabische Emirate

2006

Interventions 2002–2005, Galerie der Stadt Schwaz, Schwaz, Austria

One Second, One Year, Palais de Tokyo, Paris
on mobility, Trafo, Budapest und de Appel, Amsterdam
Österreichisches Kulturinstitut, Prag

2005

Transportable Works, Lombard Freid Projects, New York "O," Galerie Kunstbuero, Vienna, Austria
A Migration of Energies, Part I: Clouding Europe, Galerie Nadine Gandy, Bratislava
lives&works in Vienna, Kunsthalle, Vienna
Galerie Claus Andersen, Copenhagen
OKAY/O.K., Swiss Institute, New York City
Don't interrupt your activities, Royal College, London
update, Künstlerhaus, Vienna

2004

Untitled, Thomas K. Lang Gallery, Webster University, Vienna, Austria
Manifesta 05, San Sebastian
Beuys don't cry, Galleria Zero, Milan
Personne n'est innocent..., Confort Moderne, Poitier
Niemandsland, Künstlerhaus, Vienna

2003

Synchronization, Offspace, Vienna, Austria
Privatisiert, Galerie Corentin Hamel, Paris, France
klimatisch im hoch, Galerie Lisi Hämmerle, Bregenz
VV2, Biennale di Venezia, Venice
critique is not enough, Shedhalle, Zürich

2002

Parlez-vous francais, Galerie Hohenlohe&Kalb, Vienna
facing 2, Galerie der Stadt Wels, Wels
haunted by detail, Stichting de Appel, Amsterdam
interim platform, Galerie Kerstin Engholm, Vienna
big torino, Biennale internazionale arte giovane, Turin

2001

responsible transformation, Cittadellarte, Biella
video etc., Passagengalerie, Vienna
