= The Jewish World (London) =

London-based Jewish weekly newspaper

The Jewish World was an English-language Jewish weekly newspaper published in London during 1873–1934. It was founded in February 1873 by journalist and communal worker George Lewis Lyon (1828–1904), but it passed to other hands several years before his death. For some period of time it published a Yiddish supplement. In 1913, it was taken over by The Jewish Chronicle and merged with it in 1934.
