= Ned Temko =

American journalist and newspaper editor

Edward James Temko (born November 1952) is an American journalist and newspaper editor who has worked much of his life in London in the United Kingdom. He has also been based in cities such as Lisbon, Brussels, Beirut, Moscow, Jerusalem, and Johannesburg. His articles appeared mainly in The Observer newspaper and focused on political and social issues. He previously wrote for The Guardian and was, until 2005, editor of the Jewish Chronicle. He is a correspondent for The Christian Science Monitor. Temko is a regular panelist on the BBC World programme Dateline London and BBC TV's Question Time. Temko has a regular column for the Monitor called "Patterns" based on Joseph C. Harsch's "Patterns of Diplomacy" column, in which Temko tracks trends in human connection.

== Personal life ==
Temko was born into a Jewish family in Washington, D.C. but currently resides with his family in London.

Media offices
Preceded by Geoffrey Paul	Editor of The Jewish Chronicle; 1990–2005	Succeeded by David Rowan
