= James Darling (publisher) =

Scottish bookseller, publisher and bibliographer (1797–1862)

- Born: James Darling; 1797; Edinburgh, Scotland
- Died: 1862 (aged 64–65); Kentish Town, London, England
- Resting place: Highgate Cemetery (west side)
- Occupations: Bookseller, publisher, bibliographer
- Known for: Founder of the Clerical Library; author of *Bibliotheca Clericalis* and *Cyclopædia Bibliographica*

James Darling (1797–1862) was a Scottish bookseller, publisher and bibliographer.

== Life ==
He was born in Edinburgh in 1797, and in 1809 was apprenticed to the publisher Adam Black. Having completed his term he came to London in 1818 and entered the establishment of Ogle, Duncan, & Cochran, 295 High Holborn, who carried on a trade in theological books. He remained with them until 1825, when he started in business on his own account at Little Queen Street, Lincoln's Inn Fields.

For many years he was a member of the Scottish presbyterian church, and was one of the friends of the Rev. Edward Irving; subsequently he joined the Church of England. Acting on a suggestion of several clergymen, he in 1839 began a library for the use of theological students. It was at first named the Clerical Library and afterwards the Metropolitan Library. Every subscriber of one guinea was to have the privilege of borrowing from the library any volume he pleased, and subscribers were also entitled to make use of the reading-room as a kind of club, with papers, reviews, and magazines being supplied. The Clerical Library was not successful as a business, and Darling returned to work as a bookseller.

Darling died at his residence, Fortess Terrace West, Kentish Town, London, on 2 March 1862 and was buried on the western side of Highgate Cemetery.

== Works ==
Darling compiled in 1843 the ‘Bibliotheca Clericalis, or the Catalogue of the Books in the Clerical Library and Reading Rooms, 21, 22, and 23 Little Queen Street, Lincoln's Inn Fields,’ a volume of 316 pages, giving an abstract of the contents of all the major works. In 1851 he brought out the first part of the ‘Cyclopædia Bibliographica, or Library Manual of Theological and General Literature: Authors,’ a rival to the works of Robert Watt and William Thomas Lowndes. The first part, ‘Authors,’ was completed in 1854. It contains the names of notable theological authors, gives a short biographical or descriptive notice of their writings, and then an analysis of each volume. The second volume appeared in 1859. It contained ‘Subjects,’ and gave an account of works bearing on the scriptures, a list of commentators on every book, and a list of all the sermons on every verse of the Bible. Darling had then an assistant in his son. A promised third volume of ‘General Subjects in Theology’ was never published. Another work bearing his name is ‘Catalogue of Books belonging to Sir William Heathcote at Hursley Park, 1834,’ lithographed in imitation of manuscript.
