= Marcus Hyman Bresslau =

British newspaper editor

- Born: 1807 or 1808; Breslau, Kingdom of Prussia
- Died: 14 May 1864; London, England

Marcus Hyman Bresslau (Note: Yiddish: מרדכי במ״ה חיים ברעסלוי; also known as Marcus Heinrich Bresslau, Marcus Heymann Bresslau, Mordechai Chaim Bresslau, etc.) (1807/8 – 14 May 1864) was a Prussian-born English Hebraist, editor, author, and journalist.

== Biography ==
He was born to Gutel and Ḥayyim Bresslau in Breslau, Germany, and moved to London as a youth. He received a traditional Jewish education, and at some point became influenced by the ideas of the Haskalah. For a time, he taught Hebrew at the Westminster Jews' Free School, and worked as baal keriah at the Western Synagogue, at which he occasionally delivered sermons.

He then became connected with the Hebrew Review, which ran under the editorship of Morris J. Raphall from 1834 to 1836. He became editor of the Jewish Chronicle in October 1844, when the periodical was revived by Joseph Mitchell. As editor, he advocated for popular education, for a more effective system of Jewish communal poor relief, and for certain changes to Orthodox liturgy and ritual. He resigned in October 1850 after disputes with Mitchell, but on the latter's suicide in June 1854, he re-assumed the editorship and became sole proprietor, though he sold it a few months later. Some years later, he tried to revive the Hebrew Review, but failed, and he then retired from active work.

Bresslau was the author of a Hebrew grammar and dictionary. From the German, he translated devotional exercises for women, and copied various Hebrew manuscripts in the collection at Oxford. He helped to translate into English the two volumes of "Miscellanea" from the Bodleian, edited by Hirsch Edelmann. Bresslau also publicly criticised the London Society for Promoting Christianity Among the Jews, and wrote of the denial of Jews' rights in England.

Bresslau declined numerous offers of employment within the Jewish community, and he lived his later years dependent on charity. A public subscription and testimonial were presented him during this time, in recognition of a thirty-year literary activity.

== Partial bibliography ==
- Devotions for the Daughters of Israel; A Collection of Concise Prayers for Jewish Females, for Week Day, Sabbath, New Moons, Festivals, and Fasts. London: I. Vallentine. 1852.
- English and Hebrew Dictionary. London: John Weale. 1854.
- A Compendious Hebrew Grammar. London: John Weale. 1855.
- "The Sabbaths of the Lord"; Being Sabbath Meditations of the Pentateuch and Haphtorahs, Each Medidation Concluding with an Appropriate Prayer. London: s.n. 1858.

== Notes ==
Media offices
Preceded by Joseph Mitchell	Editor of The Jewish Chronicle; October 1844 – c. October 1850	Succeeded by Joseph Mitchell
Preceded by Joseph Mitchell	Editor of The Jewish Chronicle; June 1854 – February 1855	Succeeded by Abraham Benisch
