= Tomko =

Tomko is a surname. Notable people with the surname include:

- Al Tomko (1931–2009), Canadian wrestler and wrestling promoter
- Brett Tomko (born 1973), American baseball player
- Dewey Tomko (born 1946), American poker player
- Jozef Tomko (1924–2022), Slovak Catholic cardinal
- Sara Tomko, American actress
- Travis Tomko (born 1976), American wrestler
