= Sydney Montagu Samuel =

English writer

- Born: 21 June 1848; East London, United Kingdom
- Died: 21 June 1882 (aged 34); Fulham, Middlesex, United Kingdom
- Education: University College, London

Sydney Montagu Samuel (21 June 1848 – 21 June 1884) was an English journalist, librettist, financier, and communal worker.

== Biography ==
Samuel was born in East London to Jewish parents Eliza (c. 1828–1895) and Moss S. Samuel (c. 1820–1877), a Birmingham-born jeweller and cigar dealer. His maternal uncle was Samuel Montagu, 1st Baron Swaythling, and he was a first cousin of Louis, Henrietta, Lily, and Edwin Montagu, and of Stuart and Herbert Samuel.

Samuel was a broker of the city of London, and was engaged in the banking establishment of his relatives, Samuel Montagu & Co. He contributed poetry and articles on financial matters to the Examiner and other publications, and wrote for the Times an annual financial survey.

He became honorary secretary to the Jewish Board of Guardians in 1878, and wrote its annual reports from 1878 to 1882. He held a similar office in the Jewish Association for the Diffusion of Religious Knowledge, and assisted in establishing the Jewish Working Men's Club. He and Israel Davis jointly purchased the Jewish Chronicle from the Anglo-Jewish Association, to which it had been left by Abraham Benisch on his death in 1878, and appointed as editor Asher Myers. In 1879 he travelled to the Holy Land, Egypt, and elsewhere in the Near East, where he investigated the condition of the local Jewish communities. The result was embodied in his Jewish Life in the East (1881).

As a playwright, Samuel wrote the English libretto of Victorien Sardou's Piccolino, produced in 1879 at Her Majesty's Theatre, London, by the Carl Rosa Opera Company, and at the Gaiety Theatre in Dublin. In collaboration with James Donzel, he translated Victor Hugo's La lyre et la harpe into English verse for a cantata by Camille Saint-Saëns, produced at the Birmingham Musical Festival in 1879. A comedietta by him and Henrietta Cowen entitled A Quiet Pipe was produced at the Folly Theatre in 1880. The play involved in its plot "the repugnance of a bride to her husband's pipe, the deceit which became necessary for him to secure his smoke, and the consequent misunderstandings and explanations." He also worked with William Black to dramatise the latter's novel Sunrise, under the title Nathalushka.

Overwork took a toll on his health, and he was admitted to the Munster House Lunatic Asylum in Fulham, Middlesex, on 17 November 1882. He died there in 1884, on his 34th birthday.

== Bibliography ==
- Hugo, Victor (1879). La lyre et la harpe [The Lyre and the Harp]. Translated by Samuel, Sydney M.; Donzel, James. Paris: Durand, Schoenewek & Cie. Music by Camille Saint-Saëns.
- Sardou, Victorien; Nuitter, Charles-Louis-Étienne (1879). Piccolino. Translated by Samuel, Sydney M.
- Samuel, Sydney M.; Cowen, Henrietta (1880). A Quiet Pipe: An Original Domestic Scene. London: P. Vallentine.
- Samuel, Sydney M. (1881). Jewish Life in the East. London: C. K. Paul & Co.
