= Leopold Kessler (Zionist) =

Engineer, newspaper publisher and Zionist (1864–1944)

- Leopold Kessler in Africa, May 1892
- Born: 4 February 1864; Gliwice, Prussia (now Poland)
- Died: 3 January 1944 (aged 79); New York City, New York, United States
- Education: Freiberg University of Mining and Technology
- Occupations: Engineer, publisher
- Children: David F. Kessler
- Parent(s): Jacob Kessler; Johanna Feig

Leopold Kessler (4 February 1864 – 3 January 1944) was an engineer, newspaper publisher and Zionist. He was instrumental in building many of the institutions that supported the establishment of Israel as a Jewish state.

== Early life ==
Leopold Kessler was born on 4 February 1864, into a family that had been settled for some 250 years in Gliwice, Upper Silesia: then part of Prussia, now part of Poland. He was the youngest of five children of Jacob Kessler and Johanna Feig. His maternal grandfather was Jacob Feig, one of the first Jews permitted to settle in nearby Tarnowitz.

Kessler studied at the Mining Academy in Freiberg and joined the German Student Corps' Teutonia chapter. However, he left because of anti-Semitism and because he did not agree with his fellow members' drinking and brawling. He spent a year at the Royal School of Mines in Berlin before returning to Freiberg to complete his studies. Afterward, he left Germany, because he no longer wanted to live in a country where Jews were treated as second-class citizens.

Kessler became a mining engineer in Rhodesia before going in 1896 to the Transvaal to become general manager of a mine.

== Introduction to Zionism ==
Kessler wrote in his unfinished autobiography that when he read the booklet "The Jewish State" by Theodor Herzl, he felt he had discovered the solution to the problems that had troubled him in his student days. From then on, he declared himself to be a Zionist and became one of the earliest Zionist pioneers in South Africa. In 1899, he became president of the Transvaal Zionist Association and went to Basel, Switzerland, for the first time. He caused a stir at the Third Zionist Congress, where Jews from all over the world had rallied to Herzl’s call. Kessler was "greeted with enthusiastic applause" after presenting practical ideas for the Congress's Finance Commission, and was elected a member of the Greater Actions Committee.

In 1900, he made an exploratory trip to Palestine, where he stayed for several months, looking at the geographical, agricultural, and political conditions of the area. He prepared a detailed report for Herzl on the prospects of discovering natural resources such as coal and oil. He suggested publishing an Arabic newspaper and argued that Herzl should petition the Turks to remove the obstacles preventing Jewish immigration to Palestine. Kessler declared that "optimism, Jewish energy, endurance and intellect, combined with a steady immigration into the country, would lead to the factual recognition of the historical claims of the Jews to Palestine". Herzl, however, was of the opinion that mass migration should only occur once a charter had been agreed upon.

Kessler settled in London and attended the Fifth Zionist Congress in 1901. There, he was appointed secretary and became a member of the Colonization Commission. By this time, Herzl regarded Kessler as a friend and counsellor. When Herzl outlined his plan for obtaining a charter from the Turkish sultan, which required the financial and moral support of Cecil Rhodes of South Africa, Kessler offered to secure that support. However, Rhodes died soon afterward, in March 1902.

== El Arish proposal ==
The El Arish team.

In October 1902, Herzl met with the British colonial secretary, Joseph Chamberlain, and England tentatively offered El Arish in the Sinai Peninsula for Jewish colonisation. This would lead, years later, to the Balfour Declaration. During the negotiations, Herzl had Kessler in mind to participate in the expedition. Oskar Marmorek, an Austro-Hungarian Zionist, appealed to Kessler: "I know of no-one who could equal you and your knowledge for our expedition. It is therefore your duty, as a loyal comrade, to make the almost impossible, possible."

Herzl received a document about El Arish from the British foreign secretary, Henry Petty-Fitzmaurice, and noted in his diary that it suggested Marmorek, an architect; Kessler, an engineer; and Otto Warburg, an agricultural expert, for the expedition. Petty-Fitzmaurice wrote that in Kessler, he saw a "coolness and calmness" he admired, and that "because of his composure, I like Kessler very well as the leader" of the expedition. Herzl instructed Kessler to return with a report on the feasibility of settling El Arish. With that report, he hoped to obtain the charter.

In a letter dated 28 January 1902 Herzl authorised Kessler’s leadership of the expedition and laid out his role and responsibilities. Other members of the expedition included Selig Soskin, an agricultural expert, and Hillel Yaffe, a physician to the Jewish colonies in Palestine. Kessler had become friendly with these men during his visit to Palestine in 1900. Also on the team were Marmorek; Albert Goldsmid, a colonel who had taken over Baron Maurice de Hirsch’s Jewish colonies in Argentina in 1892–93; Emile Laurent, a professor at the Agricultural Institute at Gembloux; H. Stephens, an engineer, to investigate water problems; and a representative of the Egyptian government. Kessler himself was chief of the expedition, treasurer, and geological expert.

The team toured the area from 11 February to 25 March 1903. The report signed by Kessler and the other members concluded that the project depended on water supply and, therefore, that the Egyptian government should give permission to divert some water from the Nile. The Egyptian government, calculating that the plan would require five times the amount of water Stephens had estimated, turned down the proposal. Kessler, in a supplementary report, stressed that colonisation could be carried out without Nile waters (by damming wadis, sinking wells, etc.), and Stephens reiterated his calculations with fresh evidence, but permission was once more refused. Kessler and Goldsmid then pursued futile political discussions with Egypt.

== Uganda proposal ==
After the El Arish plan failed, the British government offered Uganda for Jewish colonisation. There was enthusiasm for the proposal at the Sixth Zionist Congress, which voted by a large margin to set up a commission to investigate the possibilities of the territory. Kessler led the nine elected members of the commission, including Warburg, Joseph Cowen, L.J. Greenberg, and Chaim Weizmann. On 27 September 1903 he wrote to Herzl that he considered it almost "hopeless to attempt to establish a purely European colony in the heart of Africa".

Kessler’s correspondence with Herzl and Warburg shows that Kessler was convinced that without Jewish enthusiasm, it would be impossible to establish a Jewish state in East Africa. For that reason, he argued that the project should be handed over to the Jewish Colonisation Association (founded by Maurice de Hirsch), whilst the Zionist Organisation should concentrate only on Palestine.

Herzl’s death and the heated debate about Uganda delayed the departure of the expedition until December 1904. As Kessler had predicted, the report was discouraging, and the 7th Zionist Congress in 1905 turned down any colonisation site but Palestine.

== English Zionist Federation ==
At the Ninth Zionist Congress in 1909, Weizmann and others attempted to depose David Wolffsohn as president of the Zionist Organization. Kessler thanked Wolffsohn for his dedication and proposed a vote of confidence in him. The opposition promptly brought forward a motion of censure, but Kessler’s proposal was accepted by an overwhelming majority.

In 1910, the English Zionist Federation (EZF) was leaderless and on the verge of disintegration. In February 1912, Kessler became its president because he was not personally involved in the controversies surrounding its leadership. He opened the EZF's conference on 1 June 1913 by welcoming the appointment of a new chief rabbi, Joseph Hertz, an old friend of Kessler's from South Africa. At the request of Kessler and other delegates, Cowen accepted the presidency. Kessler remained on the executive committee. On 11 February 1917 Weizmann was elected president of the EZF, and Cowen joined Kessler on the executive committee.

In 1918, the EZF published a 20-page brochure, "History and Development of Jewish Colonisation in Palestine", written by Kessler. He wrote that a Jewish Palestine with a population drawn from all countries would be "the ideal which all nations profess to have made their own".

== Other activities ==
When L.J. Greenberg decided, with some friends, to acquire The Jewish Chronicle, Kessler provided most of the funding. The acquisition changed the direction of the newspaper, which had been anti-Zionist but became very supportive of the cause. Kessler became director and later chairman of the board. The newspaper's support for Zionism was helpful in the 1917 battle to obtain the Balfour Declaration.

Kessler was present at the birth of the Jewish National Fund and became its chairman. He was elected to the board of the Jewish Colonial Trust, which became Bank Leumi, as early as 1903, and remained a member of its directorate for almost 20 years.

== Final years and legacy ==
At the end of his life, Kessler lived in New York City. He died on 3 January 1944 without seeing the realisation of his life's work; Israel was established just over four years after his death.

Despite the influence Kessler had on the creation of the modern state of Israel, no street in Israel bears his name. However, a girls' school built in 1969 in Lod was named in his honour.

== Bibliography ==
=== Sources ===
- Zionist Central Archives, Jerusalem

=== Bibliography ===
- Kessler, Leopold. An Incomplete Autobiography. unpublished.
- Sokolow, N. (1919). History of Zionism. Vol. 2 vols. London.
- Sachar, Howard M. (1976). A History of Israel: From the Rise of Zionism to Our Time.
- Lageur, Walter. A History of Zionism.
