= Harold Riley (artist) =

Salford artist (1934–2023)

Harold Riley DL
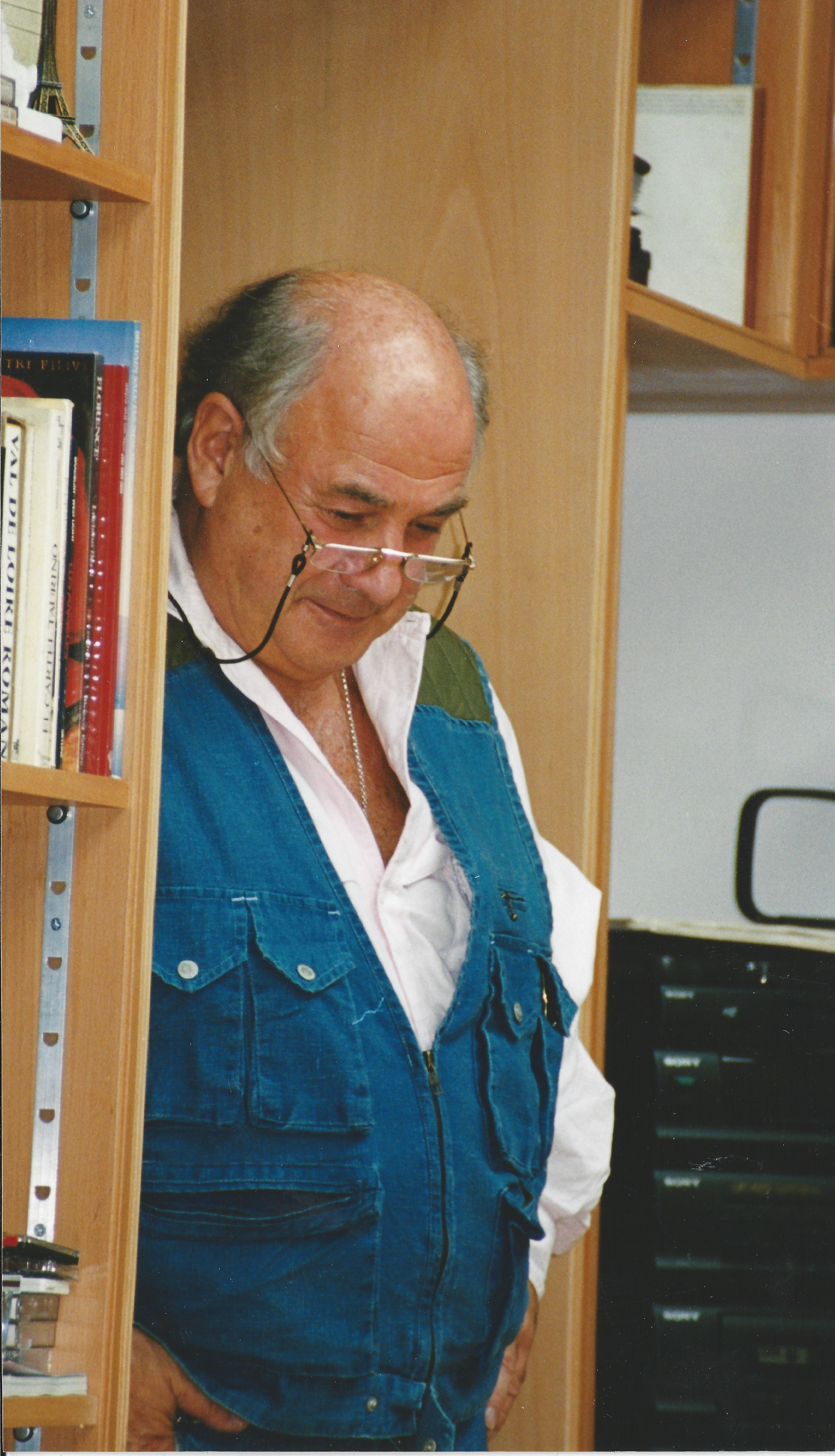
- Riley in 2010
- Born: Harold Francis Riley; 21 December 1934; Salford, Lancashire
- Died: 18 April 2023 (aged 88)
- Occupation: Artist
- Spouse(s): Hannelore (died 1973) Ashraf (m. 1976)
- Children: 2

Harold Francis Riley, DL (21 December 1934 – 18 April 2023) was an English artist. He sold his first painting to the Salford Museum and Art Gallery when he was 11.

== Biography ==
Riley was educated at Salford Grammar School, from where in 1951 he won a scholarship to the Slade School of Fine Art, University College London. After a one-year postgraduate course at the Slade, he won a travel scholarship to Italy, followed by a British Council Scholarship to study in Spain, and went on to study in Florence and Spain. He completed his National Service as an officer in 1957.

In 1960 Riley returned to Salford, where he continued to live and work until his death in 2023. He believed his main work was to document the city and his life-cycle in Salford in paintings, drawings and photographs. His deep affection for his home town cemented a friendship with L. S. Lowry, which began when Riley was a student.

Riley was awarded honorary doctorates by the universities of Salford, Manchester, London and Florence. Riley's commissioned painted portraits include Prince Philip, Duke of Edinburgh, Prince Alexander of Yugoslavia, Princess Alice, Duchess of Gloucester, Pope John XXIII, Pope Paul VI, Pope John Paul II, former U.S. Ambassador to Great Britain Elliot Richardson, United States presidents John F. Kennedy and Gerald Ford, and Nelson Mandela.

Riley was famous worldwide for his sporting pictures, particularly of golf and football. His golf images are in private and public collections throughout the world. His football paintings have centred largely on his links with Manchester United, with whom he played as a junior before going to university. The club has an extensive collection of his work, but the majority remains in his archive.

Thanks to Salford City Council, an archive and studio have been created for him in a conservation area around the old fire station on the Crescent in Salford. Here Riley continued to work and his drawings, paintings and photographs of the city are housed here, as well as his extensive collection of sports studies. A charitable trust, the Riley Educational Foundation, has been set up to look after his life's work.

In 2016 he published a limited-edition book on his friendship with Nelson Mandela. The book took six years to complete and each copy was priced at £17,500. Proceeds from the sale went to the Riley Educational Foundation, a charity that supports art in the north-west of England.

== Personal life ==
Riley was married twice. His first wife Hannelore died in 1974. They had one daughter, Kate, born in 1969. He married his second wife, Ashraf, in 1976 and their daughter Sara was born in 1977. The couple had three grandchildren.

Riley served as a Deputy Lieutenant of Greater Manchester from 1984 until his death. He received the Freedom of the City of Salford on 15 November 2017.

Riley died on 18 April 2023, at the age of 88.
