= William Frankel =

Editor of British weekly newspaper The Jewish Chronicle (1958 - 1977)

William Frankel (3 February 1917 – 18 April 2008) was the editor of the British weekly newspaper The Jewish Chronicle from 1958 until 1977. He wrote the books Friday Nights (1973), Israel Observed (1980), Survey of Jewish Affairs (1982–1992), and Tea With Einstein and Other Memories (2006).

== Early life ==
Frankel was born in London, the son of Isaac Frankel, an Orthodox Jew, the beadle of the Artillery Lane synagogue in Spitalfields, and a stallholder in Petticoat Lane. He attended the Davenant Foundation School, at that time located in the East End; the Regent Street Polytechnic; then the University of London, graduating with honours in law.

== Career ==
He read for the bar, becoming a barrister in 1944 as a member of the Middle Temple. He also became general secretary of the Mizrachi Organisation of Great Britain and Ireland, a religious Zionist group. He joined The Jewish Chronicle as general manager in 1955. In 1967, he was interviewed by Bernard Braden about contemporary controversies in the press and the future of the Middle East. In 1968–69, he was visiting professor at the Jewish Theological Seminary in New York City. He acted as special adviser to The Times on Jewish and Israeli affairs, and held a number of public or honorary posts, including president of the Mental Health Review appeals tribunal (1978–89), chairman of the Social Security Appeal Tribunal (1979–89); an executive of the Wiener library, the Holocaust archives based in London; president of the New Israel Fund since 1997; and was awarded an honorary fellowship of Girton College, Cambridge.

== Notes ==
Media offices
Preceded by L. J. Greenberg	Editor of The Jewish Chronicle; 1958–1977	Succeeded by Geoffrey Paul
