= John Maurice Shaftesley =

English journalist & writer (1901–1981)

John Maurice Shaftesley OBE

Editor, The Jewish Chronicle
- In office 1946–1958

Personal details
- Born: 1901
- Died: 1981 (aged 79–80)
- Occupation: Journalist, writer

John Maurice Shaftesley OBE (1901–1981) was an English journalist and writer, and editor of The Jewish Chronicle from 1946 to 1958.

Educated at Salford Grammar School, he soon began a career in journalism. He was appointed Officer of the Order of the British Empire (OBE) in 1956.

He was the uncle of American volcanologist David Richardson.
