= Buile Hill Academy =

Secondary School

Location
- Chaseley Road; Pendleton; Salford, Greater Manchester, M6 8RD; England; 53.4933°N 2.3043°W

Information
- Type: Academy
- Motto: "Outcomes Focused, Child Centred "
- Established: 1973
- Local authority: Salford City Council
- Trust: Northern Education Trust
- Department for Education URN: 150868 Tables
- Ofsted: Reports
- Principal: James Haslam (Principal)
- Gender: Coeducational
- Age: 11 to 16
- Enrollment: 901
- Capacity: 900
- Colours: red, grey, black
- Website: https://bua.northerneducationtrust.org/

Buile Hill Academy (formerly Buile Hill High School then Buile Hill Visual Arts College) is a coeducational state-funded secondary school for 11-16 year olds in Pendleton, Salford, England. It opened in 1973 on the site of Salford Grammar School, and is designated a specialist school for visual arts. The school became an academy in 2016, and was taken over by the Northern Education Trust in 2024.

The school is located off Eccles Old Road, between Buile Hill Park and Pendleton Sixth Form College.

== History ==
The site was occupied by the former Salford Grammar School from 1956 until its closure in 1973. Buile Hill High School, a new 11 to 16 comprehensive school, was opened on part of the site in the same year. The grammar school's sixth form, along with that of Pendleton High School for Girls, was transferred to nearby Pendleton College. The school continued to share a playing field with Pendleton College, across the field to the north. The school buildings are over 100 years old in some parts. The acting headteacher of the grammar school at the time of its closure, Robert Blackmore, became Buile Hill's first head, and remained in the position until 1982.

In 1976, two boys aged 15 and 16 set fires in the school, causing damages costing £30,000 (equivalent to £238,286 in 2024) and destroying rare books in the library. A new art block was opened in 1989 by artist Harold Riley, a former Salford Grammar School pupil, to replace an ageing block at the school that had once been part of Pendleton High School for Girls. In 1995 the school received funding from the Foundation for Sport and the Arts to equip its new drama studio.

In 2001, Windsor Community High School was closed and its pupils transferred to Buile Hill and Hope high schools, resulting in an expansion of the school.

In 2002 staff at the school worked towards raising the £50,000 needed to apply to the Department for Education to become a specialist arts school. Buile Hill held a Valentine's Day ball featuring Coronation Street actors, and considered selling a painting by L.S. Lowry owned by the school. The school received an Artsmark Gold Award in May 2006 and was renamed Buile Hill Visual Arts College. It is one of the few schools in the Salford area with a fully working theatre and performance space.

In the summer of 2006, the headteacher Gena Merrett left and was replaced by a new 'super head', Phil Fitzpatrick. Fitzpatrick was contracted for two years with an above-average annual salary of £100,000 to improve the school's results and prepare for the move into its new buildings in 2008. However, Fitzpatrick failed to achieve the results that the council had been looking for, and in 2007 he left by mutual agreement after just two terms.

In 2007 the school's results on the standard measure (% of pupils reaching 5 GCSEs at grades A*-C) jumped from 26% to 52%. The school underwent an Ofsted inspection in October 2007 which described it as satisfactory overall with elements of good.

The school was rebuilt on the adjacent field and completed in 2008. The original buildings from 1956 were demolished in the process. The new buildings were funded through a Private Finance Initiative. In 2010 the school was issued with an ultimatum by the council to either improve standards or face closure or conversion to a privately backed academy.

Buile Hill Visual Arts College was previously a community school administered by Salford City Council. In August 2016, it was converted to an academy school and renamed Buile Hill Academy. The school was run by Consilium Academies, a multi-academy trust, until it was taken over by the Northern Education Trust (NET) on 31 August 2024.

=== Former headteachers and principals ===
==== Buile Hill High School ====
- Robert Graham Blackmore (1973 school opening – July 1982)
- David Shapcott (period including 1986)
- John Baird (period including 1988 – 1999)
- Gena Merrett (2003 or earlier – summer 2006)

==== Buile Hill Visual Arts College ====
- Phil Fitzpatrick (September 2006 – February 2007)
- Jane Bailey (acting head; February 2007 – summer 2007)
- Wyn O'Neill (September 2007 – 2010 or later)
- James Inman (period including 2012 – 2018)

==== Buile Hill Academy ====
- James Inman
- Jon Marsh (2020 or earlier – 2021)
- David Lancaster (2021 – February 2023)
- Richard Reeve (interim head; December 2023 – March 2024)
- Martin Knowles (since May 2024-4 April 2025)

•James Haslam (since 4 April 2025-)

== Performance ==
At its latest Ofsted inspection in June 2022, it received the rating 'requires improvement'. In 2023 only 20% of students achieved grade 5 or above in English and maths GCSEs, compared to the England average of 45%. In 2018 it was also rated 'requires improvement'.

== Indecency case ==
In March 2014, Edward Beetham, a former head of year and humanities teacher at the school, pleaded guilty to indecency with an 11-year-old pupil in the early 1990s. He was spared jail, but was subjected to a two-year community order, with a requirement to attend a sex offenders' programme. His defence barrister, Stuart Duke, told Manchester Crown Court: "He has lost his good character. He has gone from being a genteel, retired schoolteacher playing petanque to somebody who will be monitored by the authorities – it has been absolutely devastating for this to come back and haunt him." When sentencing, Judge Patrick Field QC, told Beetham: "You developed and encouraged a relationship with (the victim) – this appears to me, at least in part, grooming behaviour, enabling you to lure him into your bedroom where you invited an undoubtedly bewildered child to beat you for your own sexual gratification."

== Notable former pupils ==
- Wes Butters – TV and radio presenter
- Michael Appleton – Professional football manager and former footballer
- Mark Hendrick – Labour politician
