= BBC Birmingham =

Regional arm of the BBC

Coordinates: 52°28′34.42″N 1°54′15.32″W

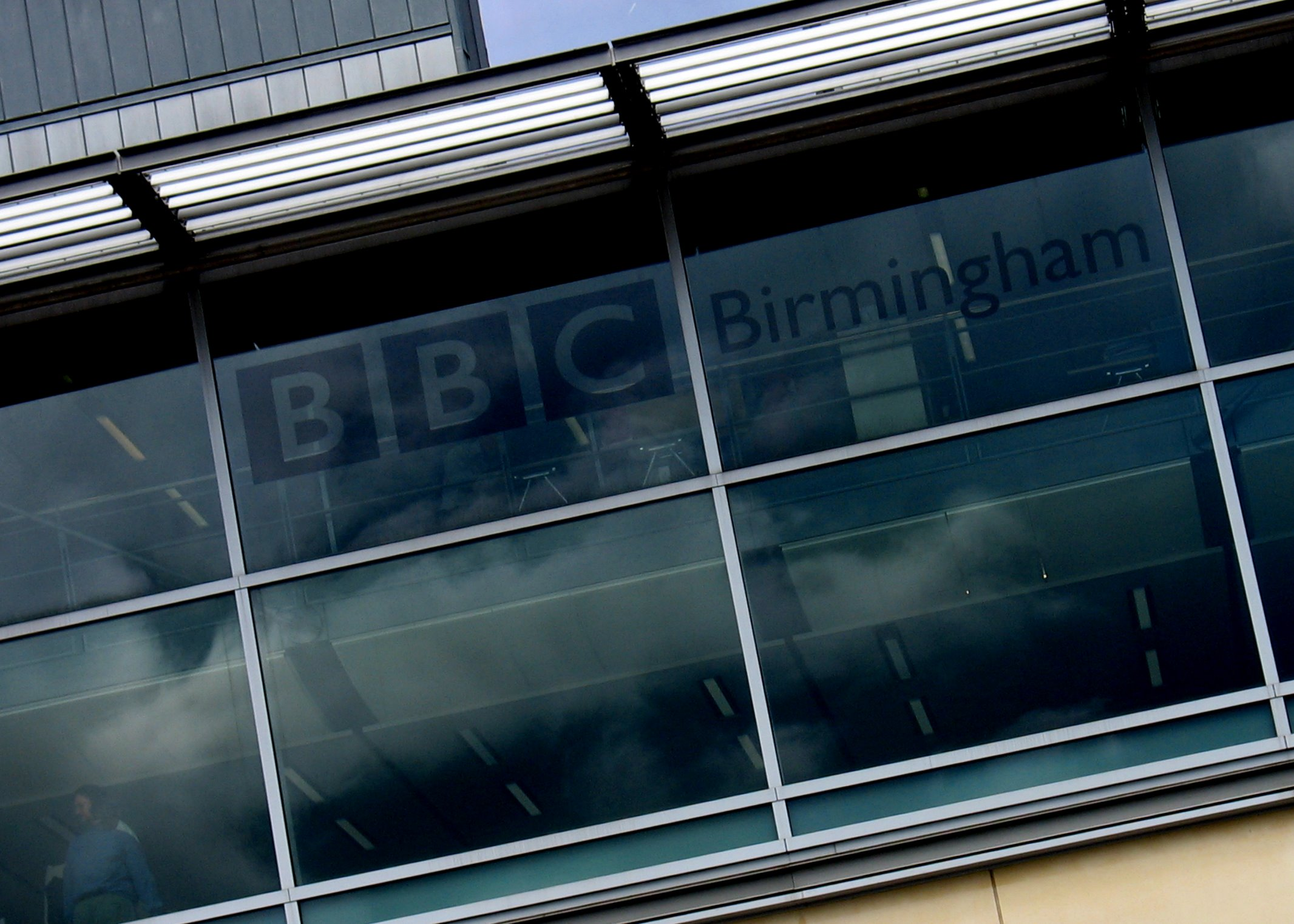
BBC Birmingham

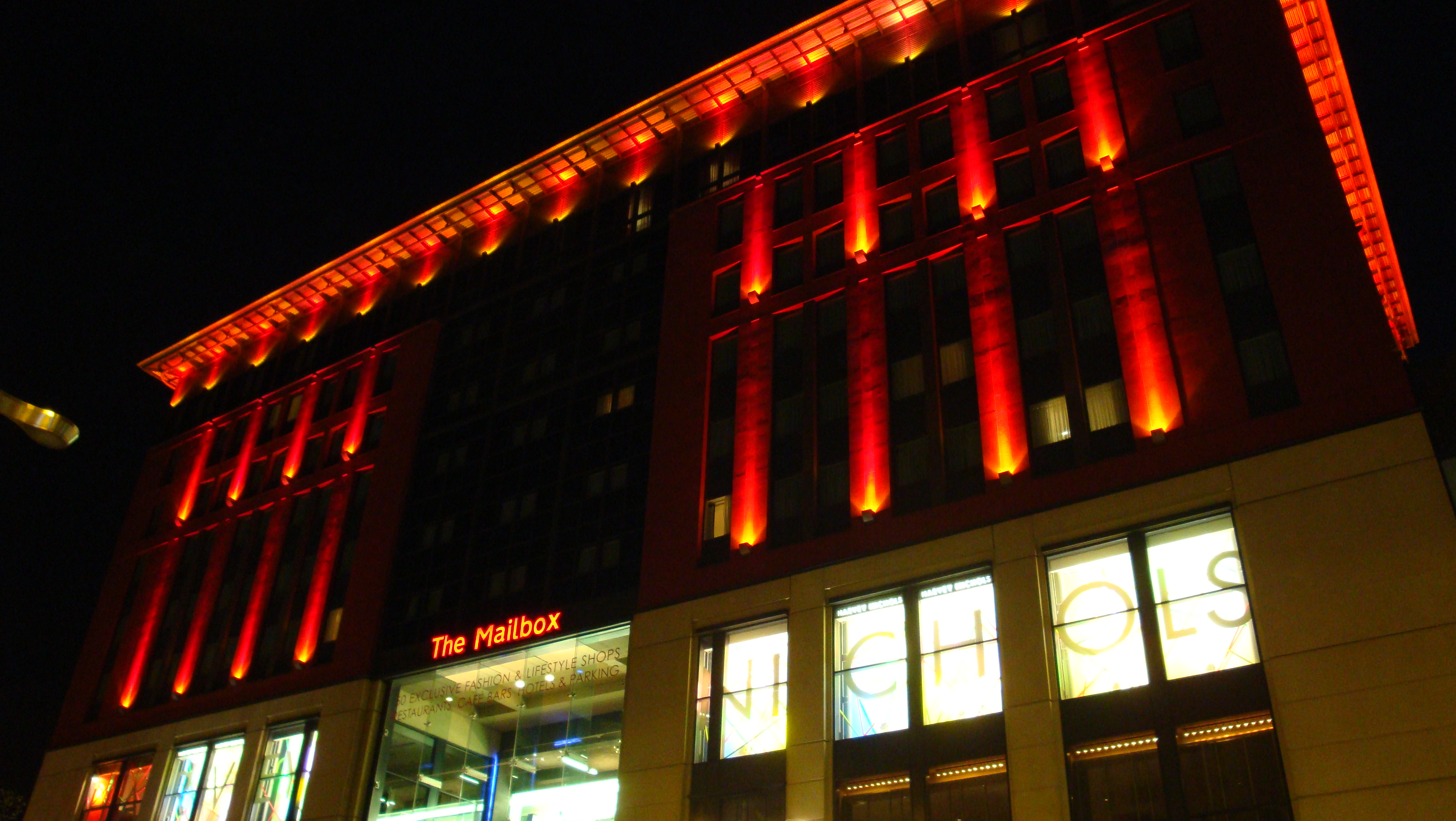
The Mailbox at night, current home to BBC Birmingham

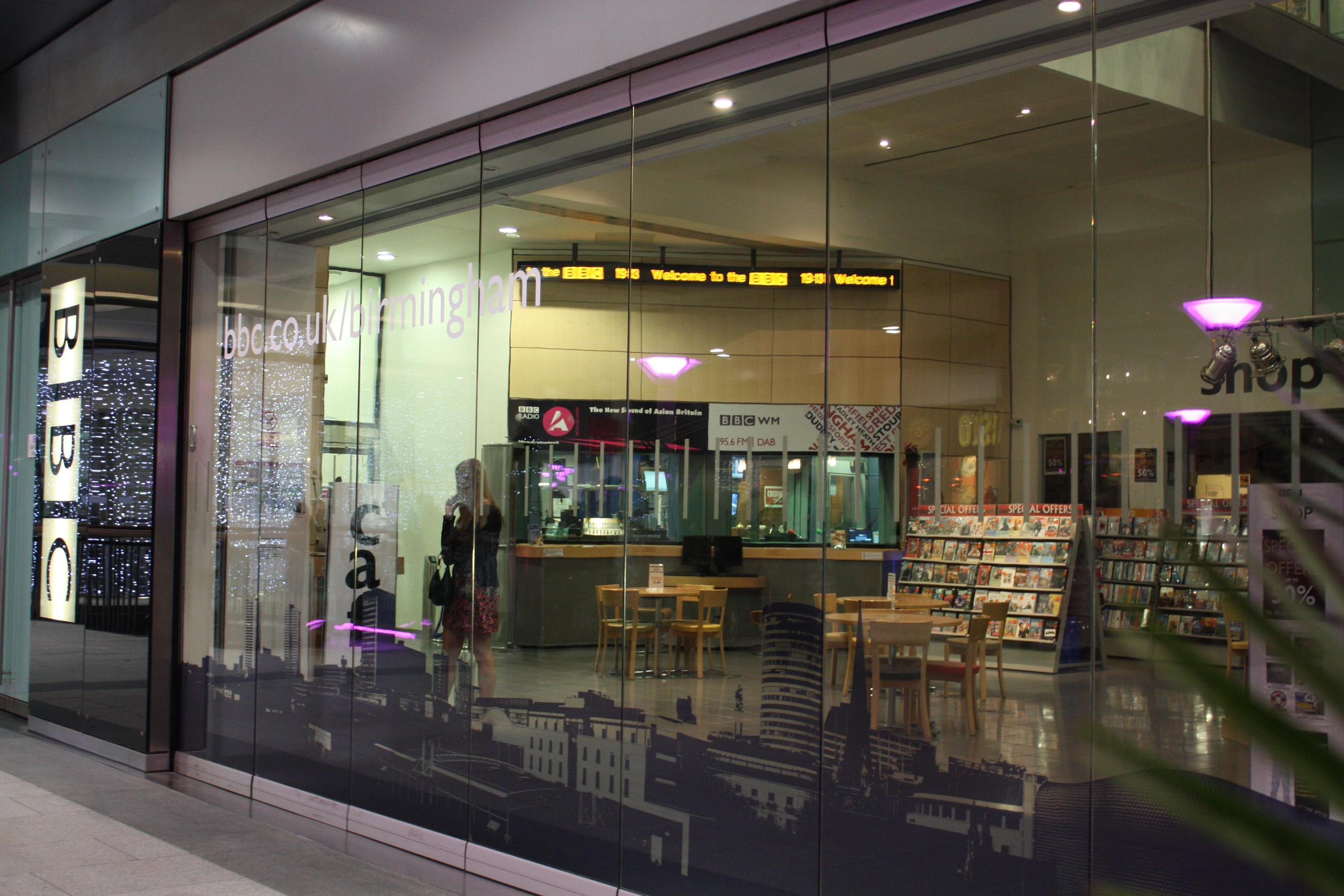
The BBC Birmingham public space on Level 3 of the Mailbox

BBC Birmingham is one of the oldest regional arms of the BBC, located in Birmingham. It was the first region outside London to start broadcasting both the corporation's radio (in 1922) and television (in 1949) transmissions, the latter from the Sutton Coldfield television transmitter.

From 1971 BBC Birmingham was based at the Pebble Mill Studios, replacing studios on Broad Street, but in 2004 moved to the Mailbox facility in the city centre. Pebble Mill has been demolished to make way for a dental hospital and school of dentistry, which opened in 2016.

BBC Birmingham is not to be confused with BBC Midlands, which is also based at the Mailbox. While BBC Birmingham is the name of the Network Productions Centre in Birmingham making network programmes for television and radio, BBC Midlands is the regional operation providing news, current affairs and other regional programmes.

Some departments within BBC Birmingham, such as factual programming, have been subject to review as part of a wider restructuring process. Much of the factual department, making programmes such as Countryfile, has been moved to either Bristol, Salford or other BBC offices.

== Buildings ==
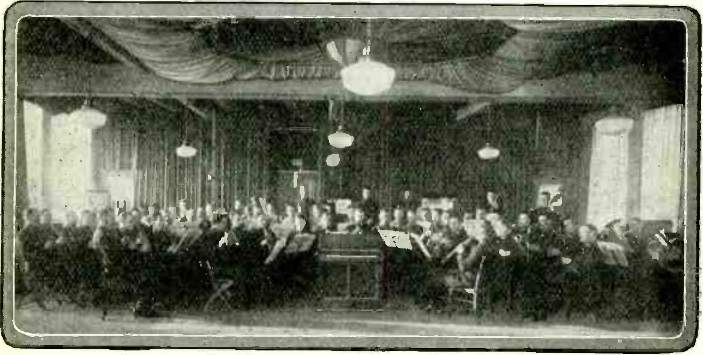
The BBC's radio studio in Birmingham, from the BBC Hand Book 1928, which described it as "Europe's largest studio"

The British Broadcasting Company's (Note: the British Broadcasting Company became the British Broadcasting Corporation on 1 January 1927) first Birmingham radio station, 51T, initially broadcast from temporary premises at Witton in November 1922, before moving the following year to a former cinema on New Street. The transmitter was located at Birmingham City Council's Summer Lane electricity generating station.

In 1926, they moved to a custom-built, two-storey studio building in Broad Street, which was opened on 20 January. The main studio, at 45 by 50 feet (14 by 15 m), was then the largest in the country.

Subsequently, several converted buildings across the city were used for the BBC's operations in Birmingham. At some point after the Second World War the BBC took over the headquarters of the Birmingham Royal Institution for the Blind, a very large collection of buildings in Carpenter Road, Edgbaston. Here in the 1950s were several radio studios, the largest of which was used by the Midlands Light Orchestra for rehearsals and live broadcasts.

In 1957 BBC TV was established in Birmingham for the first time taking over the MLO's studio and installing the necessary lighting on builders' scaffolding. By gutting an ex-London redundant BBC TV outside broadcast unit ("Scanner") the necessary three cameras (RCA 3 inch image orthicons) were salvaged. The associated camera control units, sound and vision production/mixer desk and seating were all very precariously held together with Dexion angle and old packing cases. A smaller room alongside was used for early evening local news broadcasts by dragging a camera in from the main studio. Acoustic treatment was achieved using old egg trays glued to the walls. It was all "make do and mend" and breakdowns were frequent.

In 1959 a new purpose built news studio equipped with latest "miniature" Vidicon cameras was established in Broad Street in an old building backing on to Gas Street Basin. This building was already the main "switching centre" for the national network for radio and TV. Carpenter Road was also the base for BBC Midlands TV outside broadcasts with MCR10 – an articulated mobile control unit – equipped with Marconi Mk1 3 inch image orthicon cameras. It was also the base for the necessary VHF/UHF "Links Unit" to get the outside broadcast pictures and sound back into the national network – in the Midlands area usually via the main TV transmitter mast at Sutton Coldfield. In 1959 the BBC acquired the Victorian-era Delicia cinema at Gosta Green and this was completely internally altered to become a fully equipped TV studio and TV film unit with canteens, offices, green room and editing suite.

Network television was based at Gosta Green just north of the city centre. Regional television and some radio production were in Broad Street. Other radio studios were located at Broadcasting House in Carpenter Road, Edgbaston, and at the Walker Hall in Ampton Road, Edgbaston. The Carpenter Road site also housed the administrative offices.

All these departments, together with a new local radio station, were unified on the Pebble Mill site in a phased move during 1970–71. The new complex, known as the Broadcasting Centre, was the BBC's first building designed for both television and radio studios, and housed the corporation's largest TV studio outside London at the time.

When Pebble Mill closed in 2004, BBC Birmingham moved to the Mailbox building in the city centre, and to the BBC Drama Village in the Selly Oak district.

It was announced in August 2022 that BBC Birmingham will leave The Mailbox for the new creative quarter in Digbeth from 2026. The new broadcast centre will occupy the former Typhoo Tea factory. By then, in adjacent studios, the BBC show MasterChef will already have taken up residence. The move coincides with the BBC's lease at The Mailbox coming to an end.

== Notable historical BBC Birmingham productions ==
=== Drama ===
In the 1970s and 1980s, BBC Birmingham was home to the English Regions Drama Department, established in 1971, and headed by the senior BBC producer David Rose. Its remit was to produce programmes set in various regions of England in order to provide balance to the output from London.

Among the department's perhaps best known productions are Boys from the Blackstuff (1982); Play for Today – The Fishing Party; contributions to Thirty-Minute Theatre; and a series of plays by new writers, called Second City Firsts, produced by Peter Ansorge and Tara Prem, which aired on BBC2. The unit also produced the first BBC Television drama with a predominantly black and Asian cast, Empire Road (1978–79) also on BBC2. The long-running Sunday evening series The Brothers (1972–79), which starred Jean Anderson, was also a fixture at the studios.

=== Pebble Mill at One ===
BBC Birmingham used the main foyer of its Pebble Mill building for the early afternoon television magazine programme Pebble Mill at One, which ran from 1972 until 1986 and raised the profile of the studios to something of a national institution. The idea to use the foyer came about because of a lack of other studio space. It was one of the few daytime magazine programmes at the time, and quickly became popular. The Pebble Mill format returned in 1988 as Daytime Live, renamed Scene Today and finally Pebble Mill.

There was a Pebble Mill spin-off during the 1970s, when BBC 1 rested its main Saturday chat show, Parkinson. BBC Birmingham was commissioned to produce a late night replacement. The result was Saturday Night at the Mill with Kenny Ball and his Jazzmen as the regular house band, who also performed the show's signature tune. The programme was directed and produced by Roy Norton and Roy Ronnie.

In 1981, an early evening version of a 1960s hit show on BBC1, called Six Five Special, re-surfaced during the Mill's summer break, presented by Donny MacLeod and Marian Foster, and occupying the slot vacated by Nationwide.

=== Programmes for Asian viewers ===
During the early '60s, BBC Birmingham pioneered television programmes, for the Asian community. These were presented and produced by Mahendra Kaul and directed by Ashok Rampal, and broadcast on Sunday mornings on the sole BBC Television channel at the time. The programme, Apna Hi Ghar Samajhiye ("Make Yourself At Home") aired on Sundays at 9.00am for half an hour.

=== Hosted programmes ===
The Birmingham studios also occasionally accommodated productions usually based in London when regular studio space was unavailable, for example the children's programmes Play School and Jackanory, and the current affairs programme Nationwide during the power cuts of 1972 when the Lime Grove studios in London were in darkness.

Some nationally popular programmes were hosted by BBC Birmingham and recorded at the Pebble Mill Studios which included the children's programme The Basil Brush Show.

=== Other programmes ===
A popular BBC2 programme from Birmingham for much of the 1970s to 1990s was snooker programme Pot Black, generally shown most Fridays throughout the year at 9 pm.

Well-known BBC programmes based in Birmingham included the drama series Dalziel and Pascoe, Dangerfield, All Creatures Great and Small, Howards' Way, This Life, daytime soap opera Doctors, anthology series The Afternoon Play and daytime property show To Buy or Not to Buy. Quiz shows including Telly Addicts were recorded at Pebble Mill. Gardening programme Gardener's World, cooking show Hairy Bikers, factual series Coast the countryside and environmental series Countryfile and viewer feedback show Points of View were also all based here, until moving to BBC Bristol and BBC Northern Ireland, respectively. The original series of Top Gear was also produced by BBC Birmingham as was some content of the astronomy-based programme The Sky at Night, while the rest is produced in Selsey.

== Current BBC Birmingham productions ==
BBC Birmingham output has steadily diminished over time as production has moved elsewhere with the closure of Pebble Mill and the development of other BBC sites. Doctors was produced at the BBC Drama Village in Selly Oak, but was cancelled in 2024, and The Archers is produced for BBC Radio 4. For afternoon broadcast after Doctors, Father Brown and Shakespeare & Hathaway: Private Investigators are current BBC Birmingham productions whereas The Afternoon Play, Land Girls, WPC 56, and The Coroner are former productions. The closure of the Factual Unit in 2012 meant no factual programmes outside of regional output are produced in Birmingham.

The Midlands contributes the highest portion of the BBC's revenue through licence fees (£942 million) yet has the second lowest amount of BBC spending in the region, after Northern Ireland. This equates to "91% of Midland BBC licence fees spent elsewhere".

== Regional output ==
As with all other BBC regions, BBC Birmingham is responsible for providing local radio services and the regional television news broadcasts on BBC One during the times when all regions opt out of the network feed to provide their own local news programming, which in the BBC Birmingham area is called Midlands Today.

BBC Midlands Today is broadcast from in the Mailbox in Birmingham, and is the regional news for:

- Herefordshire
- Worcestershire
- Warwickshire
- West Midlands
- Shropshire
- Staffordshire
- Northern Oxfordshire
- Northern Gloucestershire

BBC Radio WM also broadcasts from the Mailbox studios; it provides local radio to Birmingham, West Midlands, the Black Country, and southern Staffordshire.

== See also ==
- BBC Asian Network
- Sue Beardsmore
- Ashley Blake
- Carl Chinn
- Sonia Deol
- Ed Doolan
- David Gregory-Kumar
- Kay Alexander
- Nick Owen
- Shefali Oza
- Satnam Rana
- Suzanne Virdee
- Adil Ray
- Peter Sissons
- Adam Yosef
- Michael Buerk
