= Birmingham Studios =

There are, or have been, several studios in the city of Birmingham, England that could be described as Birmingham Studios.

== Television ==
=== BBC ===
- Pebble Mill Studios in Edgbaston Location of BBC Birmingham and BBC West Midlands from 1971 and 2004.
- The Mailbox Location of BBC Birmingham and BBC West Midlands since 2004.
- BBC Drama Village in Selly Oak BBC Drama Studios.

=== ITV ===
- Alpha Studios, shared by ATV Midlands and ABC Weekend TV from 1956 to 1970.
- Central House, previously ATV Centre, used by ATV and later Central from 1970 to 1997.
- Gas Street Studios, used by Central (Now ITV Central) since 1997, also used by CITV between 1998 and 2004.

== Radio ==
- The Mailbox, BBC Radio WM and BBC Asian Network.
- Nine Brindleyplace, Hits Radio Birmingham and Hits Radio Coventry & Warwickshire
- One The Square, Capital Birmingham and Heart West Midlands
