= Miriam O'Reilly =

Irish television presenter

- Born: 16 February 1957 (age 69); Balbriggan, County Dublin, Ireland
- Occupations: Television and radio presenter
- Employer: BBC
- Political party: Labour Party

Miriam O'Reilly (born 16 February 1957 in Balbriggan, County Dublin) is an Irish television presenter. Until 2009, she was a presenter on the BBC One rural affairs show Countryfile.

== Early life ==
The daughter of an Irish farmer who came to England in the 1950s, O'Reilly left school aged seventeen, keen to be a journalist.

== Journalism and broadcasting career ==
She applied for newspaper apprenticeships while working several jobs, including work on the children's television programme Tiswas. She then worked for the BBC on the Radio 4 programmes Farming Today, Costing the Earth and Woman's Hour. She also worked as a television presenter on Countryfile until 2009. During her time at the BBC, O'Reilly won the Foreign Press, Royal Television Society and British Environment Media awards. O'Reilly was also well known as a co-presenter on the BBC's Midlands Today programme, alongside longtime regulars Kay Alexander and Sue Beardsmore.

After she was dropped from Countryfile in 2009, she successfully sued the BBC for age discrimination, saying at the start of her court case that she could no longer watch the programme after being axed from it, as it was too emotionally painful. During the hearing, former BBC One Controller Jay Hunt (ten years O'Reilly's junior) was called as a witness, with O'Reilly accusing her of ageism and sexism, and claiming that she "hated women." In January 2011, the day after Hunt began working at Channel 4, O'Reilly's claims for age discrimination and victimisation were upheld.

In February 2011, O'Reilly presented a show about ageism on ITV1 called Too Old For TV?, as part of the Tonight television series. In March 2011, as part of its coverage of International Women's Day, The Guardian newspaper included O'Reilly in its list of the "Top 100 Most Inspirational Women" in the world saying, "The landmark judgement will change the way the BBC, and inevitably other broadcasters, operate." Some time after the case, O'Reilly spoke about how dozens of older BBC women presenters had their careers saved as a result of her legal action. O'Reilly was also included in an exhibition at BBC Television Centre of women who had made a significant contribution towards equality at the Corporation since its formation in 1922.

In June 2011, O'Reilly returned to the BBC as the co-presenter for the third series of Crimewatch Roadshow with Rav Wilding. In July 2011, a photograph of O'Reilly by Kate Peters was exhibited at the National Portrait Gallery in the People of Today collection. O'Reilly announced in January 2012 that she would cease working with the BBC to concentrate on her charity, the Women's Equality Network.

On 22 February 2012, the comedian Rowan Atkinson had a letter he wrote to The Media Show about the O'Reilly case read. His attitude was not sympathetic, and he complained that the creative industries should not be used a platform for launching legal cases against discrimination. Atkinson was denounced for suggesting that members of the industry were above the law, and his response was criticised.

In July 2012, it was revealed that BBC Director-General George Entwistle told O'Reilly that he was keen for her to return to the BBC in a prominent presenting role.

In September 2012, the deputy leader of the Labour Party, Harriet Harman, asked O'Reilly to head up Labour's new commission on older women in the media and public life.

In 2017, O'Reilly appeared as one of the hosts on the Channel 5 series Secrets of the National Trust.

O'Reilly's fight for equality for older women was included in a book on 21st century feminism, What Should We Tell Our Daughters? by Melissa Benn. O'Reilly is quoted "everyone plays down the problems of older women ... it's as if younger women project their fear of the consequences of their own ageing onto other women, rather than tackle the structures that diminish us all." In 2019, in her book, Equal, former BBC China Editor Carrie Gracie acknowledged O'Reilly's stand gave her the courage to fight her case against the BBC for pay discrimination writing, "If others were putting their shoulder to a heavy wheel, how could I remove my own? What would Emmeline Pankhurst think? Or Oprah? Or Miriam O'Reilly?"

== Labour Party ==
In April 2013, O'Reilly revealed that she was putting her name forward to be selected as the Labour Party candidate for the Nuneaton seat at the 2015 general election. On 6 July, O'Reilly lost the vote for selection as the PPC for Nuneaton. Constituency Labour Party members opted for local candidate, 22-year-old Victoria Fowler.

In April 2015, O'Reilly accepted Labour's offer to be the first independent Commissioner for Older People in England had it formed the Government following the May general election that year. The role would have included promoting awareness of the rights of older people and challenging discrimination against pensioners.

== Personal life ==
She is married to her husband Mark and has a son from a previous relationship. O'Reilly is the sister of the playwright Kaite O'Reilly, winner of the Ted Hughes Award (2011) for her version of Aeschylus' tragedy The Persians.
