= Joanne Malin =

British radio and television presenter (born 1967)

Joanne Malin (born 22 March 1967) is a British radio and television presenter. She is a presenter on Midlands Today.

== Biography ==
Joanne Malin was born in 1967 to parents Kenneth and Dorothy and has two siblings. Malin is married but has no children. Originally from the Moseley area of Birmingham, Malin trained to be a dancer at the Italia Conti Academy in London and worked in local theatre productions. Her first professional show was Jack and the Beanstalk with Russ Abbot at the Birmingham Hippodrome, performing as Little Miss Muffet in the chorus. She then did a provincial tour with the show 42nd Street, before taking her next role as Frenchie in a six-month sell-out tour of Grease. After more panto in Birmingham, she took a nine-month contract dancing on the QE2. At the age of 25, she then switched career and retrained by taking a National Council for the Training of Broadcasting Journalists course at Portsmouth, where she graduated with a distinction and won a prize for Best Documentary. Joanne started out working in the news departments of local radio stations before being hired by Reuters to work on breakfast news bulletins for Virgin Radio.

From here, she switched from radio to television, despite having no previous experience, and joined the infamous cable channel, L!VE TV in London as a newsreader and a stand-in presenter. During her time at the station, she presented coverage of the death of Diana, Princess of Wales. In 1998, Malin joined Central Television (where she had already made a few guest appearances in her previous career as a dancer) and became anchorwoman for the West Midlands edition of Central News (later Central Tonight). She has also made appearances in regional programmes broadcast across the whole Central region.

In August 2006, Malin made the headlines after accidentally swearing during an outside broadcast on Central Tonight. She was in Stoke-on-Trent in Staffordshire with the Central Tonight tour bus, in overcast weather conditions, when she ad-libbed "...it would be lovely here in the sun, but it's pissing it down". Malin apologised shortly after this on-air mistake.

On 10 October 2008, she announced her decision to leave ITV Central, shortly after the announcement of 60 job losses at the station and a major restructuring of Central News. Malin presented her final programme for the station on 31 October 2008. A week beforehand, Malin announced live during an interview on BBC Radio WM that she would be joining the BBC on a two-year contract. She hosted Mornings With Joanne Malin, on BBC Radio WM, starting in February 2009, while contributing to Midlands Today and the West Midlands edition of Inside Out. In early 2012 she moved to the lunchtime slot on BBC Radio WM.

On 11 August 2012 it was announced Malin would leave the station in September 2012, but Malin continued to present across the BBC Midlands Today output. She has been a regular weekday presenter on the breakfast, lunchtime and flagship 6.30 programmes along with co-presenters Nick Owen , Mary Rhodes and Sarah Falkland.

She has also returned to the stage on three occasions, in 2007, 2008 and 2013, to appear in pantomimes at the Lichfield Garrick Theatre.

== Awards ==
In October 2006 she won the Royal Television Society Midlands Centre's Best On Screen Personality award, for her work on Central Tonight. She had previously won the award in October 2003 and has also won the Harold Wincott Award for a series of business reports on Central News at Six.

Three days prior to leaving ITV Central, she won the RTS Midlands' Best Female Personality award for 2008.
