= Virdee (surname) =

Virdee is a surname. Notable people with the surname include:

- Daljinder Singh Virdee (born 1990), British pharmacist
- Suzanne Virdee (born 1969), British journalist
- Tejinder Virdee (born 1952), Kenyan physicist
