= Stephen Marley (writer) =

British author and video game designer

Stephen Marley is a British author, voice director and video game designer. He was born in Derby of Irish parents and was educated in Bemrose School in Derby and at Nottingham. He graduated in Social Anthropology in 1971 in London, gained an M.Sc in the Sociology of Science in 1973 and worked on his Ph.D on ancient Chinese science while lecturing in Manchester. He gave up an academic career and took up writing full-time in 1985. From 1995 onwards he has also followed a parallel career in video games. In one game he designed on PlayStation, Martian Gothic, he voice directed, among others, Fenella Fielding and Julie Peasgood.

He has had eight novels published, the most recent a thriller entitled The Heresy. His third novel, Mortal Mask, was acclaimed 'his masterpiece' in the Clute/Grant The Encyclopedia of Fantasy.

== Novels ==
- Spirit Mirror: Chia Black Dragon series; dark fantasy: publisher HarperCollins (1988)
- Mortal Mask: Chia Black Dragon series; dark fantasy: publisher Random House (1991)
- Shadow Sisters: Chia Black Dragon series; dark fantasy: publisher Random House (1993)
- Judge Dredd: Dreddlocked; science fiction: publisher Virgin Books (1993)
- Judge Dredd: Dread Dominion; science fiction: publisher Virgin Books (1994)
- Doctor Who: Managra; science fiction: publisher Virgin Books (1995)
- The Heresy: thriller Musa Publishing (2013)
- Mary Messiah; historical/fiction: publisher. Endeavour Press (2015)

== Short stories ==
- Diary of a (Mad?)man prequel story for Dreamweb video game (see also video games)
- Bibliophage in Virgin Decalog 5 (1997)
- Waters-of-Starlight in Virgin Decalog 5 (1997)
- Count (Baron) Dracula and Baron (Count) Frankenstein in Andromeda Spaceways Inflight Magazine (2010)
- Knitworld in Perfect Timing 2 (1999)
- All the Fun of the Fear in Burning with Optimism's Flames (Obverse Books) 2012, edited by Jay Eales.
- Young Sherlock Holmes and the Mansion of Doom in Tales of the Great Detectives (Obverse Books) 2014, edited by Philip Purser-Hallard.
- Apocryphon in Tales from the Vatican Vaults (Robinson Publishing) 2015, edited by David V Barrett.

== Video games ==
- Dreamweb on PC and Amiga: prequel story published with the game. Developers, Creative Reality; publishers Empire Interactive (1994)
- Warhammer: Dark Omen on PC: dialogue scriptwriter and voice acting direction. Developers, Mindscape; publishers Electronic Arts (1995)
- Martian Gothic aka Martian Gothic: Unification on PC and PlayStation: designer, dialogue scriptwriter, voice acting and casting director. Developers, Creative Reality; publishers Take 2 (2001)
