= A Journey to London =

- Written by: Arthur Hopcraft; John Vanbrugh
- Directed by: Gareth Davies
- Starring: Robin Bailey; Trevor Bannister; Anthony Collin; Margaret Courtenay
- Music by: John Addison
- Country of origin: United Kingdom
- Original language: English

Production
- Producer: Peter Duguid

Original release
- Release: 1 April 1975

A Journey to London is a 1975 British comedy television film directed by Gareth Davies and starring Bill Maynard, Joan Sims and John Curless. It is based on the restoration comedy play by John Vanbrugh.

== Plot summary ==
Sir Francis Headpiece takes his family to London.

== Cast ==
- Robin Bailey as Sir Charles
- Trevor Bannister as Colonel Courtly
- Anthony Collin as John
- Margaret Courtenay as Mrs. Motherly
- John Curless as Squire Humphrey Headpiece
- Jenny Donnison as Trusty
- Jan Francis as Martilla
- Sarah Grazebrook as Deborah
- Freddie Jones as Lord Loverule
- Helen Lindsay as Lady Arabella
- Bill Maynard as Sir Francis Headpiece
- Clive Merrison as Captain Toupee
- Julie Peasgood as Miss Betty Headpiece
- Joan Sims as Lady Headpiece
- Pam St. Clement as Doll Tripe
- Raymond Witch as Shortyard
