= David Gregory =

David or Dave Gregory may refer to:

== Sciences ==
- David Gregory (mathematician) (1659–1708), Scottish mathematician and astronomer
- David Gregory (physician) (1625–1720), Scottish physician and inventor

== Writers ==
- David Gregory (author), Christian author
- David Gregory (journalist) (born 1970), American journalist and former host of NBC's Meet the Press
- David Gregory (historian) (1696–1767), English churchman and academic
- David Gregory-Kumar, BBC News journalist

== Sports ==
- Dave Gregory (cricketer) (1845–1919), Australian cricketer
- David Gregory (footballer, born 1951), English footballer
- David Gregory (footballer, born 1970), English footballer
- David Gregory (footballer, born 1994), English football goalkeeper

== Other ==
- Dave Gregory (musician) (born 1952), guitarist for XTC
- David Gregory (Royal Navy officer) (1909–1975), British admiral
- David A. Gregory (born 1985), American TV actor
- David Gregory (politician), Missouri politician
