= Mary Rhodes =

British news presenter

Mary Rhodes (born 28 November 1969) is the main presenter of the BBC TV news programme Midlands Today.

She was previously a regular sports presenter on BBC World, BBC One and BBC News 24. She hosted the daily magazine programme 110%.

== Early life ==
Rhodes was educated at Weobley High School before taking A-levels in Communication Studies, English, General Studies and Psychology at Hereford Sixth Form College. She graduated in 1990 from Birmingham Polytechnic (now Birmingham City University), where she studied for a degree in media and communications (specialising in television).

== Broadcasting career ==
Before coming to News 24, Rhodes was a freelancer, working across the BBC's radio stations. Her favourite sport is tennis, and her break in sports reporting/presenting came when she was at Wimbledon, presenting on the local radio service Radio Wimbledon. She has been covering the tournament since 1995.

Rhodes also presented The Heaven and Earth Show on BBC1.

In 2011, she took over as presenter of BBC West Midlands show Inside Out after the programme went through several guest presenters following the sacking of previous presenter Ashley Blake. Rhodes also became a reporter on Midlands Today alongside her Inside Out duties and, in 2012, she became the main presenter of Midlands Today when Suzanne Virdee left the programme. She shares main presenting duties with Nick Owen.

Mary is a fan of West Bromwich Albion Football Club and a member of their Warwickshire Supporters Club Branch.
