= Link Electronics =

Link Electronics Ltd.

General information
- Location: Andover, Hampshire, England
- Owner: Link Electronics Ltd

Link Electronics Ltd. was a major British industrial and broadcast television equipment manufacturer and systems integrator in the 1970s and 1980s. The company was founded by John Tanner and David Mann, who began manufacturing television cameras in 1966.

Link was known mainly for its range of broadcast television cameras, but was also a manufacturer of outside broadcast (OB) vehicles, including the BBC "Type 5". Link also produced a wide range of ancillary studio equipment, such as distribution amplifiers, measuring sets and test-signal generators.

== Cameras ==
Link started as an industrial camera manufacturer but soon moved into broadcast equipment when the BBC approached it to develop a successor to the commercially successful EMI 2001, when EMI's own design for the 2001's successor, the 2005, failed to meet expected standards when launched around 1975. The poor performance of this camera, considering its development cost, led to EMI exiting the broadcast camera industry. A similar fate befell Link around 10–15 years later upon the release of the Link 130 (further down this page).

=== Type 100 ===
The Link-NEC 100 was the companion camera to the Type 130 and designed in conjunction with NEC. It had a triax interface unit and could be used stand alone, via a radio link or with a CCU via triax cable. it shared a common architecture with the 130 by using the same 18mm tubes and both where fully automatic for set-up and used the same CCU (camera control unit), OCP (operational control unit) and MSU (master setup unit).

=== Type 109 ===
The Type 109 was a broadcast quality black-and-white camera mainly used as a caption scanner or simple telecine.

=== Type 110/111 ===
The 110 was Link's first attempt at a colour broadcast camera and around 200 cameras were manufactured. Styling was based on the EMI 2001 colour camera but at an economical price, including what some claim to be a very flimsy casing that was not of rugged design.

The camera consisted of a closed body and an internal lens from a range of manufacturers, like the EMI 2001, leading to similar claims that the design was "boxy". The camera was capable of both studio and outside broadcast use and at the BBC found its way into TC6, TC8 and several presentation studios at Television Centre, BBC Lime Grove, BBC Bristol, BBC Cardiff, the Open University studio in Milton Keynes, BBC Wood Norton Training Centre and onto several BBC outside broadcast vehicles. ITV company Thames Television also used the camera at their Euston Road studios from around 1979, replacing their Marconi MkVIIs (with RCA TK-47s at Teddington a few years later replacing the EMI 2001s there).

The 110 was seen as a good, cheap, modern option which was lightweight and easier to carry compared to the much older and heavier EMI 2001 camera. The Link 111 was a low-cost version of the Link 110 with a reduced feature set. In the Video Yearbook for 1977 the Link 111 is listed at £12,000 less tubes & lens.

=== Type 120 ===
The Link 120 was a portable camera system that consisted of the camera head and a portable electronics box that then connected to the CCU via standard TV36 multicore cable. The Type 120 was intended to be able to 'clip' into a studio frame to allow easy conversion from either a handheld camera on location or to a large-lens camera at sports events in studio. An advert in the Guild of Television Cameramen magazine ZERB notes that there are three options, the Type 121 shoulder mount (with long 3-inch viewfinder), Type 122 with 3-inch viewfinder, Type 123 in sports camera body and 5-inch viewfinder, and the Type 124 with full studio lens and 7-inch viewfinder. The Link 125 camera was the next step to a purpose-designed studio camera.

=== Type 125 ===
The Link 125 camera was purchased in quantity by the BBC and deployed to most of the studios at Television Centre, Pebble Mill in Birmingham and Broadcasting House, Belfast as well as several other BBC studios. It was also the camera of choice at Limehouse Television. In addition, ITV company Television South (TVS) used the model in its Maidstone studios, which were still in use by those studios when they were sold as an independent studio facility following the loss of TVS's franchise at the end of 1992.

The 125 was a well-thought-out and well-built studio and OB camera developed from the Link 120 portable camera system. It also contained a comprehensive communications system and used a camera control unit (CCU) based around the 110 but was updated with auto black, white, iris and centering functions.

The BBC preferred to use a mid-range Schneider-Kreuznach lens as it gave good zoom angles. Some believed it produced one of the best images for a pickup tube camera; others believed it could never match the quality of the EMI 2001. Many BBC users felt that the image was soft and not easy to focus. It also produced an unusual image effect that formed the shape of a 'teardrop' in the centre of the image. The Link 125 was the most successful of all of Link cameras. It is believed the last studio to use them was BBC Pebble Mill, which decommissioned the last four in 1994 from the news studio, having upgraded to Sony BVP-375's and Ikegami HL-55's a few years before. These cameras have become collectable vintage items.

=== Type 130 ===
The 130 was designed in the mid-1980s as a high-tech modern camera with aspirations of quality and high-tech design through the use of microprocessors for full auto setup. Unfortunately, it soon became apparent that there were several hardware and/or software errors made during the design and manufacture of this model, which seriously affected the manufacturer's reputation with its broadcast customer base, in much the same way the EMI 2005 had done around 15 years earlier. This was compounded by competition from high-quality camera systems from Japanese manufacturers including Sony, Ikegami and Hitachi and by the Dutch manufacturer Philips. Also at this time RCA had started to use CCDs in its cameras, which produced what was considered a superior picture to the then-prevailing technology of camera pickup tubes, which necessitated not as many regular adjustments in their setup procedures.

In the mid-1980s, the BBC was designing the Type 6 scanner and had chosen the Link 100 and 130, and had several camera channels for testing. Prototypes had been sent to broadcasters in Israel, Sweden and Australia. The BBC Link 130 cameras were initially installed in Elstree Studio A and at BBC Wood Norton along with some NEC MNC-100 lightweight cameras. They had been in development for a few years and the idea was to use Studio A Elstree and BBC Glasgow (which received the first batch) as test beds to try to make them work, but they proved to be very unreliable. John Wardle, Head of BBC Engineering, stated that 42 Link 130s were ordered but it is believed only 11 production units were delivered.

The trial showed the camera suffered from poor design and many software bugs (that would leave the camera's automatic lineup software switched on and the cue light happening to cause picture interference). The BBC engineering department felt that these faults wouldn't be fixed quickly and the order for Television Centre was cancelled and TVC was fitted with Thomson1531 cameras. As a result, this act allegedly caused the final collapse of Link, which was declared bankrupt. UEI Group then briefly purchased the company, after investing many hundreds of thousands of pounds in the development of the camera only for the poor design not being rectified in the design or prototype stages giving Link a poor reputation after several technically and commercially successful models. The company then transferred to the ownership of Quantel.

There are several units in private collections and, until the early 2000s, several casings were to be seen at the National Science and Media Museum in Bradford as part of a public display.

== Studio equipment ==
Link produced a full range of sync pulse generators, colour bar generators, video distribution amps and various other pieces of industrial and broadcast television equipment.

Including -

=== 107 Camera Tube Test Channel ===
A Plumbicon tube condition tester

=== 251 Colour Synchronising Pulse Generator ===
A Colour Synchronising Pulse Generator including mixed sync and blanking, line and field, PAL subcarrier and PAL ident.

=== 255 Series PAL Encoder ===
A PAL Encoder with picture input and three composite outputs. Optional modules could produce black and burst signals and colour bars.

=== 286 Rack Frame ===
8-module rack with space for a 260 Series PSU.

=== 260 Series Generators ===
Worked with the 251 Sync Generator.

- 260 Ramp Generator
- 261 RGB Colour Bar Generator
- 262 PAL Black and Burst Generator
- 263 Grille and Dot Generator
- 264 Step Staircase Generator
- 265 Picture Line-Up Generator (PLUGE)
- 268 Phase-Locked Sweep Generator
- 271 6-In/1-Out Selector Panel
- 272 PAL Burst Adder

=== 280 Video Distribution Amplifier ===
A universal mains-powered video/sync distribution amp with six individual isolated outputs. A rack frame was available to hold up to 8 modules.

=== 290 Video Delay ===
290 Single-Channel Delay and 291 Triple-Channel Delay that were housed in the 280-type chassis.

=== 329 Waveform Generator ===
Generates a 5-step staircase pattern, peak white and black signals and PAL sub-carriers.

=== 360 Video Noise Meter ===
A device for checking the quality of a video signal.

=== 700 Series Talkback/Intercomm ===
Link 700 series intercom where custom built systems using computerized FET cross-point switching with selector panels and feeds to and from VT's and cameras.

=== 710 Directors Talkback ===
Specially designed for EFP (electronic field production) applications. It consisted of three control panels (Director, Vision Engineer and Sound Engineer) which had access to each other, as well as a maximum of four cameras and an auxiliary feed (production sound).

=== 760 Series Audio Distribution ===
- 760 1-In/8-Out Audio Distribution Amplifier
- 762 Rear Connector Assembly

=== 787 Telephone Exchange ===
A telephone exchange system capable of working with up to 10 external lines and up to five operating positions, each position having a keypad with an illuminated push-button for each line and a buzzer that sounded for 2 seconds when an incoming call was received.

== Outside broadcast vehicles ==
PYE TVT had supplied the BBC with its television OB vehicles from the 1950s until the early 1980s. But for the Type 4 PYE equipped the two vehicles with LINK-110 cameras. When the Type 5 was being designed in 1978, Link offered a design in that provided a full facility unit with up to eight cameras (although BBC OBs chose the Philips LDK-5, not a Link camera) at least 20 were supplied to the BBC and at least five to ITV and non UK customers. One Type 5 (London 6) was donated to the Science Museum and has now been sold to a group of ex-broadcast engineers, who are slowly restoring it.

== Quantel-Link ==
Following its bankruptcy, UK digital broadcast equipment manufacturer Quantel, famous for the Paintbox graphics system, acquired the company and used it to develop a facilities integration and design company known as Quantel-Link. This company continued to design and manufacture outside broadcast vehicles to many national broadcasters, including YTE in Finland, as well as companies in France, Germany and other European broadcasters.
