= The Snarling =

2018 British comedy horror film

- DVD cover
- Directed by: Pablo Raybould
- Written by: Pablo Raybould
- Produced by: Pablo Raybould; Ben Manning
- Starring: Julie Peasgood; Ben Manning; Laurence Saunders; Joel Beckett
- Cinematography: Alex Thorn
- Edited by: Ben Manning
- Music by: Matt Bowdler
- Production company: Shooting Lodge Productions
- Distributed by: Wild Eye Releasing; Left Films
- Release dates: January 2016 (earlier version; film festival); January 20, 2018 (film festival); October 29, 2018 (DVD)
- Country: United Kingdom
- Language: English

The Snarling is a 2018 British comedy horror film directed and written by Pablo Raybould. The film stars Julie Peasgood, Ben Manning, Laurence Saunders, and Joel Beckett. The plot follows a cast and crew recording a zombie film in an old English village that gets tormented by real werewolves. Produced by Raybould and Ben Manning as Shooting Lodge Productions, the film was recorded in 2015.

The Snarling premiered at film festivals in 2016 and was later released on DVD and streaming platforms in 2018. With a runtime of 83 minutes, the movie received generally positive reviews, obtaining the award for Best Horror Film from the Gen Con Film Festival.

== Plot ==
In a quiet village in the West Midlands, a small film crew arrives to record a low-budget zombie movie, using a local pub as one of their main shooting locations. Among the crew, Greg Lupeen, a volatile small TV actor, frustrates the crew and extras with his behavior. Three locals from the village, Les, Mike, and Bob, view the production as their chance to break out in the film industry, especially since Greg is Les' doppelgänger.

As the filming progresses, a series of strange accidents and unexplained deaths disrupt the shoot. This pattern leads some villagers to believe the production is cursed, causing a frenzy in the village. When death counts ascend, a Detective Inspector and his sergeant are called to investigate. Their examination turns toward Greg, whose erratic behavior and close resemblance to the suspect's description add difficulty to the situation. With an upcoming full moon, tension rises, escalating with the investigators and villagers attempting to uncover what is really behind the murders before the situation spirals further out of control.

== Cast ==
- Julie Peasgood as Verity, the producer
- Ben Manning as Bob
- Joel Beckett as Bruce
- Craig Edwards as Pete
- Laurence Saunders as Greg Lupeen/Les Jervis
- Ashley Blake as himself

== Production ==
=== Development ===
In an interview with Philip Rogers of Nerdly, Pablo Raybould recalled that the film's comedy horror influence originated from a previous visit to the Horror-on-Sea Film Festival, where Raybould believed that he could create a movie better than the majority screened there. Pablo also stated the movie drew heavy influences from An American Werewolf in London (1981).

=== Pre-production ===
Laurence Saunders stated that Pablo Raybould reached out to him, proposing a foolish character role. Saunders found interest in involvement after reading the script, highlighting its storytelling and humour. He also recalled that other actors shared a similar experience. Ben Manning stated that Raybould called him regarding the festival, discussing the potential production of The Snarling. They originally planned to co-write, but Raybould finished it before Manning could contribute. It was written in January 2014.

Albert Moses was cast as a hospital patient in the film in honor of his role in An American Werewolf in London. This casting was conducted through mutual connections.

=== Filming ===
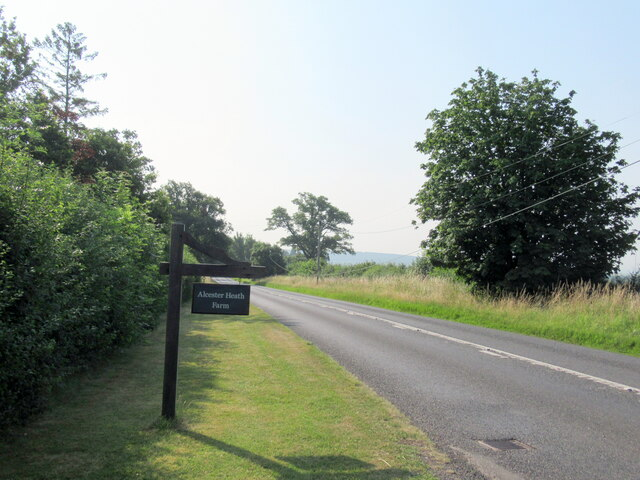
A road in Alcester, one of the film's main shooting locations.

Starburst wrote that the film was recorded throughout 2015. Filmed at Redditch and Alcester, only three people handled the majority of the behind-the-scenes production work, being: Raybould, Manning, and Jenny Browett. According to Raybould, the production members had little time to prepare lines due to their workload. Manning also shared a common ground, claiming that the process was exhausting, though the cast and crew were supportive.

Produced by Shooting Lodge Productions, The Snarling was filmed on a tight budget, a struggle for the movie's filmmaking, trailers, luxuries, and compensation for the crew. According to Manning, budget limitations sometimes led to solutions that improved scenes.

=== Legacy ===
Following the film's release, a follow-up project, "The Last Twitch," was planned. It shares a similar premise while also being filmed in the same village.

== Marketing and release ==
The Snarling premiered at the Horror-on-Sea Film Festival on January 20, 2018. Though an earlier version was previously shown there in January 2016. This earlier version was also screened at Artrix, Bromsgrove, among other locations. The showing at Artrix reportedly generated a crowd of over 200 people. The movie's trailer debuted in August 2018, with a planned release date of November. Following screenings by various festivals, the movie was officially released prematurely on October 29, 2018, on DVD. The DVD was released by Left Films and Wild Eye Releasing. It was reissued on November 5th via video on demand services.

== Critical response ==
The Snarling received generally positive reviews from critics. Zoe Gammon of Blueprint Review praised the movie, claiming that it successfully pays homage to 1980s werewolf classics, highlighting its British humour. Gammon wrote, "it is a great film that delivers laugh after laugh and pays great tribute to more notable werewolf horror movies of the 80s." Comparably, Horror DNA's Daniel Benson reviewed the film's earlier shown version, applauded its performances, and humour. Set The Tape's Wendy Attwell praised the movie as "highly enjoyable", claiming that it positively surprised them, assigning it a rating of 4/5 stars. Paul Mount of Starburst gave the movie a positive review, describing it as "a lot of fun" despite its dated jokes and cheap special effects. Mount wrote, "There’s a lot wrong with The Snarling [...] But it’s still strangely agreeable thanks to some hearty characterisation."

Horror Society gave the movie a rating of 3/5, deeming it "fun," while acknowledging its flaws. Similarly, EJ Moreno of Flickering Myth rated the movie 3/5 stars, characterizing the film as charming, crediting its comedy, framing criticism towards the movie's low-budget. In another mixed review, Alain Elliott of Nerdly praised the comedic performances, while noting the comparatively weaker horror elements.

AllMovie's staff scored the film at a rating of 2/5 stars. Jim Vorel of Paste listed the movie on his "30 Absurdly Stupid Horror B-Movies Currently Streaming on Amazon Prime" list, comparing it to The Howling (1981). In a negative review, Pip Ellwood-Hughes of Entertainment Focus criticized the movie's dated script, especially regarding the "‘easy shot' style gay jokes." Hughes also noted its underwhelming execution, writing that it "feels like a 90s B-movie and the content of its script is surprisingly problematic."

== Accolades ==
Award	Date of ceremony	Category	Result	Ref.
Gen Con Film Festival	August 7, 2016	Best Horror Film	Won	

== See also ==
- Werewolf fiction
