= Chia Black Dragon =

Series of novels written by Stephen Marley

- Spirit Mirror; Mortal Mask; Shadow Sisters
- Author: Stephen Marley
- Language: English
- Genre: Dark fantasy
- Publisher: HarperCollins, Random House
- Published: 1988–1993
- No. of books: 3

Chia Black Dragon is a dark fantasy series of novels written by Stephen Marley. The eponymous anti-hero, Chia, is identified in the novels as "The most dangerous woman in the history of man". To date, there are three Chia Black Dragon novels.

== Plot ==
=== Spirit Mirror (1988) ===
Set in 2nd-century China at the end of the Han dynasty, this is the first and least typical of the Chia books. Spirit Mirror tells the story of a mirror haunting orchestrated by her twin brother, Nyak. Atmospheric, but rather too richly written, it recounts the struggle of Chia, a part-human, part-demon Chinese woman born on the shores of north China in the 3rd millennium BC, against an insidious haunting spread through any reflective surface and her gradual realisation that her brother is behind the spreading evil. She discovers that Nyak's aim is to destroy the newly established religion of Buddhism in China. However, as in all the novels, Chia's own actions (in this case predicted by Nyak) almost bring about the very disaster she intends to avert. Although not as unconventional as the following novels, the narrative still features a great deal of the graphic violence, horror and mystical passages that characterise the later works, although the dark comedy elements are less in evidence here.

=== Mortal Mask (1991) ===
Chia comes into her own in this tale of Nyak's resurrection in a sinister mansion in Silver Music Bay. It is in this book, the first full-fledged example of "Chinese Gothic", that Chia dons her anachronistic attire and launches full flood into modernistic dialogue. Set a few years after the conclusion of Spirit Mirror, the story of Mortal Mask starts with a wild ride of a prologue in which Nyak's devastated spirit, after a titanic battle with Chia, flies east to Silver Music Bay. Some time later, Chia begins to suspect that her brother may have survived what she had hoped was their final battle after Nyak's deadly servants, the Silver Brethren, invade her home on Black Dragon Mountain. She travels to a Taoist hermitage in Silver Music Bay and meets and falls in love with Xanthippe, an orphaned Nubian girl who accompanied her parents on their journey from Egypt. Prior to Chia's arrival, all manner of insidious hauntings have afflicted the hermitage and the surrounding coastline, and with Chia on the scene matters take a turn from bad to worse. Chia eventually tracks the source of the haunting to a mansion known as the House of Heaven, which she discovers is the location of her birth and infancy. She also realises the full extent of her father's evil nature and of Nyak's impending resurrection. Mortal Mask, which was acclaimed a 'masterpiece' in the Clute/Grant The Encyclopedia of Fantasy, is essentially a deeply layered ghost story that plays out a host of metaphysical themes in a narrative that drives Chia relentlessly to the edge of damnation and an impending apocalypse.

=== Shadow Sisters (1993) ===
This is a full-scale epic, ranging from 7th-century Rome to China at the fall of the Sui dynasty. Chia has turned the Catholic Church upside down in her desperate (and insane) attempt to make herself pope in place of Pope Adeodatus I. Betrayed by one of her "disciples", Wittigis, she is forced to flee Rome and return to China after a centuries-long absence. Wittigis, self-renamed Crucifer, leads Chia's former disciples in a purportedly religious mission to China to destroy her, their quest motivated in reality by dark desires that none of the disciples care to admit. In China, Chia forms an intimate attachment to Nua, a young woman who belongs to a sort of all-female Chia fan club in which the members dress and try to act like their idol. Chia, at Nua's urging, agrees to assassinate the emperor, Yang Ti, to make way for the first emperor of the Tang dynasty. After encountering the sole disaffected member of Crucifer's followers, a man renamed Judas, Chia and Nua head for Yang Ti's southern capital of Chiang-tu (modern Yangzhou). It is in Chiang-tu that Chia discovers that Crucifer and his disciples have been transformed into non-human entities by a buried power in Shadow Hill (the site of the Buddhist monastery in Spirit Mirror) and have drawn Yang Ti and his court into an alternative and terrifying reality which threatens to absorb the world. The story reaches its climax as Chia shifts between realities and confronts an old, but unexpected, enemy.

== Reception ==
A review of the second book in Interzone described it as "pure torture"; they criticized the description of the gore and the lack of horror, noting that "Chia hovers lifeless in a void where she should have shone vivid against darkness." They further described the cover blurb as the best thing about the book. Another review from the same publication complained that for large portions of the story "nothing intelligible happens" and that the book did not "gel".

The Encyclopedia of Fantasy described the first book as "over-written" but interesting, but praised the second book as being the author's "masterpiece" and a "first rate ghost story"; the third book however was called a "disappointing romp". St. James Guide to Fantasy Writers praised the series.
