= Ashley Blake =

British newsreader

- Born: 1969 (age 56–57); Lozells, Birmingham, England
- Occupations: Presenter; Newsreader
- Organization: Sky News
- Children: 1
- Awards: Honorary doctorate, Staffordshire University
- Website: ashleyblake.tv

Ashley Blake (born 1969) is a British television presenter and newsreader. A well-known personality in the English Midlands, he worked mostly for the BBC, where his credits include reporting and presenting on Midlands Today, the region's edition of Inside Out, and briefly on the TV series Watchdog. In September 2009 he was sentenced to two years' imprisonment after being convicted of wounding without intent. He was released on 8 June 2010, after serving nine months of his sentence, as part of the home curfew system for early release. He is now a Sky News reporter.

== Early life ==
Born in Lozells, Birmingham, Blake grew up in a single-parent household. He is mixed-race, and is the youngest of six children.

== Personal life ==
Blake has one son Calam, together with his former partner Sharon Blatchford.

After his mother died of cancer in 2000, he raised money for a cancer support charity.

== Career ==
Blake has had a career "from driving and renting out cars and trucks to working with young offenders in the care of social services in Birmingham." After spending almost three years as a flight attendant for Britannia Airways, followed by a postgraduate degree in journalism, Blake started working in Liverpool for L!VE TV, before moving to its sister station in Birmingham (UK).

In 2001, he moved to London where he worked as a reporter on Watchdog as well as both BBC London News and ITV's London Tonight. Blake produced various holiday reports and then worked on London Weekend Television's Dream Ticket programme. He had a short period of service as a presenter on National TV for BBC Breakfast, before he returned to his home city to become a presenter and reporter on the BBC's Midlands Today. During his time at Midlands Today, Blake worked as a regular reporter, while also presenting the Friday Evening Late News Bulletin and the weekly edition of Inside Out for the region. Blake also regularly filled in for Nick Owen as presenter of the main edition of Midlands Today, and had occasionally presented the BBC Breakfast editions in addition to presenting the Midlands regional segments of the BBC's annual Children in Need telethon with Shefali Oza and Sarah Falkland. Blake presented his last edition of Midlands Today on 23 January 2009, before being suspended following an incident at the New Oscott restaurant, The Place 2 B, which he co-owned with his partner, Jessica Hayes, from 2003 until February 2009. This incident eventually resulted in him being sacked by the BBC.

In 2007, he was awarded an honorary doctorate by Staffordshire University for his contributions to television journalism.

On 20 September 2016 Ashley returned to the TV screen as a presenter on the (Midlands) regional edition of 'Inside Out', with a report on Croome Park and Capability Brown's garden design.

On 26 September 2016 Blake featured in a local newspaper report, in which he declared his conviction was 'spent' and the BBC explained he had been employed 'As a freelancer, he is entitled to pitch ideas and offer his services as a presenter or reporter, and we felt this segment within Inside Out was a good fit for him on this occasion.'

Blake has also appeared in various TV shows and films including Nativity! (2009) and The Snarling (2018).

== Criminal convictions ==
On 26 January 2009, Blake was charged following an incident at his former restaurant in the early hours of 25 January in which a 17-year-old was wounded. He did not present any BBC programmes for the duration of the legal proceedings.

He appeared before Sutton Coldfield Magistrates' Court charged with possessing an offensive weapon, wounding with intent and affray. Blake appeared with a second man, Steven Sproule, aged 38, of Booths Farm Road, Great Barr. Sproule was charged with assault and affray. Magistrates bailed Blake and Sproule to appear at Birmingham Crown Court on 27 April. On 27 April, both men denied the charges brought against them and were granted unconditional bail pending trial.

The trial began at Birmingham Crown Court on 27 July 2009. Blake's co-defendant, Sproule, pleaded guilty to assault occasioning actual bodily harm. Blake denied the charges, and also pleaded not guilty to a charge of attempting to pervert the course of justice by throwing the alleged weapon – a 3-foot (1 m) long patio umbrella pole – into a nearby garden centre. The court was told that Blake hit the teenager in the face with the pole. The jury retired on 31 July 2009 before giving their verdict on 3 August 2009. Blake was found guilty of unlawful wounding and perverting the course of justice, but was cleared of wounding with intent to cause grievous bodily harm. He was remanded on bail. On 2 September 2009, he was sentenced to two years in prison. In November 2009, his appeal against the sentence was rejected by the Court of Appeal He was released under home curfew in June 2010 after serving nine months of his sentence, at first in HMP Birmingham and later HMP Stafford.

As a result of the conviction, Blake was dismissed by the BBC on 14 August following an internal review.

=== Previous convictions ===
As a result of the wounding trial, Blake's previous criminal record was revealed. He had been convicted of theft on six occasions (twice in 1986, three times in 1987 and once in 1993) and handling stolen goods in 1988. In 1988, Blake was found guilty of altering documents following a traffic collision, resulting in him being disqualified from driving, a ban he broke in 1990. In an interview with rival regional news programme, ITV's Central Tonight on the day of his sentencing, Blake revealed that the BBC were unaware of his previous convictions as they were all spent convictions when he joined the corporation.

=== Drink-driving ===
After being released from prison, Blake kept out of the media limelight. In March 2011, he admitted a charge of drink driving at Sutton Coldfield Magistrates' Court. When stopped on his BMW motorbike on 10 January, the morning after a night out, he was found to be over the limit and was subsequently banned from driving for one year and ordered to pay £220 in fines and court fees.
