= Luv (TV series) =

- Genre: Comedy
- Starring: Sue Johnston; Michael Angelis; Julie Peasgood; Jan Ravens; Stephen Lord; Peter Caffrey
- Country of origin: United Kingdom
- Original language: English
- No. of series: 2
- No. of episodes: 18

Production
- Running time: 30 minutes

Original release
- Network: BBC1
- Release: 9 March 1993 – 20 April 1994

Luv is a British television sitcom made by the BBC in 1993 which ran for 18 episodes. The writer and executive producer was Carla Lane. The main characters, Terese and Harold Craven, were played by Sue Johnston and Michael Angelis.
