= Martian Gothic: Unification =

2000 video game

- Developers: Creative Reality; Coyote Developments (PS)
- Publishers: TalonSoft (PC); Take-Two Interactive (PS)
- Director: Stephen Marley
- Producers: Luke Vernon; Lee Brown
- Programmers: Neil Dodwell; Martin Wong
- Artists: David Dew; Julian Holtom; Paul Oglesby
- Writer: Stephen Marley
- Composer: Jeremy Taylor (firQ)
- Platforms: Microsoft Windows; PlayStation
- Release: Microsoft Windows: NA: April 28, 2000; EU: May 31, 2000; PlayStation: NA: November 16, 2001
- Genre: Survival horror
- Mode: Single-player

Martian Gothic: Unification is a 2000 survival horror video game developed by Creative Reality for Microsoft Windows and Coyote Developments for the PlayStation and published by TalonSoft for Microsoft Windows and Take-Two Interactive for the PlayStation. It takes place on a Martian base in the year 2019, where a crew of three have been tasked to investigate 10 months of radio silence. They soon find that the crew members of the base have been killed, and now become re-animated bloodthirsty zombies.

The PlayStation version was one of a number of "budget titles" released near the end of the system's lifespan.

== Gameplay ==
The game is very similar to the Resident Evil series: third-person perspective; fixed camera angle; tank controls; limited ammunition; strategic inventory management; countdown timer at the climax; and obtaining key-type items for progression. The game focuses heavily on puzzle solving and exploration, rather than combat. The game is centered on three playable characters that are separated, but can be swapped between at any time, similar to Day of the Tentacle. Whilst characters can communicate via radio, if they ever meet face-to-face, it will result in a game-over.

== Synopsis ==
=== Setting ===
Set in 2019, the megacorporation Earth Control has built the Vita-01 research station on Mars, located adjacent to Olympus Mons, and the first human settlement on the planet. The corridors and segments of the base are named after famous street names. The base was established following the discovery of ancient Martian bacteria, found within a meteorite in Antarctica. By the time of the game's main events, the Vita-01 base has been radio silent for ten months; the last transmission to Earth warns all future persons that come into contact with the base to "stay alone, stay alive."

=== Characters ===
The player assumes the roles of three characters sent to investigate Vita-01: American security officer Martin Karne; British bacteriologist Diane Matlock; and Japanese systems analyst Kenzo Uji. The two non-player characters are MOOD, a sentient artificial intelligence that manages the base, and medical officer John Farr (although often referred to as Ben Gunn), the deranged sole survivor of the base's initial crisis. Whilst deceased by the game's events, base director Judith Harroway is the most prominent voice featured in recovered audio recordings.

=== Plot ===
Karne, Matlock, and Kenzo arrive on Mars to investigate Earth Control's Vita-01 base, but the base's dysfunctional automated landing system causes the crash landing of their spacecraft, immediately hampering their ability to leave Mars. They enter the base by separate airlocks, in compliance with the base's final transmitted warning to enter alone. Investigating the base, the three find the inhabitants have died and subsequently revived as bloodthirsty "Non-Dead", and groups of three have merged into powerful monsters named "Trimorphs", explaining the warning to "stay alone" – should the investigation crew come into contact, they too risk transforming into one.

The crew investigate the base's downfall and cause of zombification, utilising the "vac-tube" delivery system to collaborate whilst maintaining separation. They manage to repair the base's damaged systems, such as oxygen recycling and solar power generator, to ensure their survival and progression. They also encounter paranormal events, such as floating corpses, ghosts, and reports that the base staff experienced shared dreaming.

Eventually, Kenzo gains access to MOOD, the artificial intelligence that manages the base, and revealed to have been assisting the three by transmitting passcodes to their smart watches. Entering MOOD's simulated reality interface, Kenzo learns that the decontamination procedure they each experienced upon entering the base has infected them with the same biological contagion that is reanimating the dead. He also unlocks the base's bulkheads, enabling non-linear exploration. As Kenzo leaves MOOD, it hints that Karne is hiding a secret.

Matlock discovers that the base director Judith Harroway is actually Karne's estranged partner, and they are able to use Karne's voice to unlock Harroway's diary entries. They piece together that the base staff discovered a long-dead alien civilization named the Kurakarak within the Olympus Mons volcano. There they excavated a "Pandora's Box", mistaken for a coffin but actually containing a hibernating alien queen. Exhuming the body awoke the alien, whose strong psionic powers began paranormal anomalies, leading to mass hysteria and deaths across the base. Opening the container also released the contagion, which reanimated the dead and hastened the base's demise.

Karne shares his secret: he and Harroway are members of a resistance movement against Earth Control. They have both come to Vita-01 on suspicion that Earth Control are interested in weaponizing the alien discoveries for psionic warfare. Matlock and Kenzo agree to help Karne's efforts to prevent this.

Karne encounters and trades items with doctor John Farr, the deranged sole survivor of the base's outbreak but prone to alien possession, hiding in the cafeteria. When Kenzo visits him sometime later, he finds Farr has guillotined himself. Kenzo recovers his head, and they attach it to a corpse so that he can be psionically revived and advise them how to approach the queen without going insane. Using his instructions, the three explore the alien necropolis in Olympus Mons, extracting breast milk and blood samples from the queen, and flesh of a Trimorph. Using the samples, Matlock is able to develop a serum that cures them, whilst Karne plants explosives within an Olympus Mons fissure.

Now cured, the three are able to board the base's departure spacecraft. However, before it can launch, MOOD reports its connection to the launch hatch is damaged, and must be opened manually. Karne volunteers and succeeds, but is unable to return to the spacecraft in time; his sacrifice allows Matlock and Kenzo to safely evacuate back to Earth. The explosives detonate, erupting Olympus Mons so that it destroys Vita-01 and the necropolis, thus preventing further psionic discoveries by Earth Control.

== Development ==
Creative Reality's last game shares the same team and same writer as Dreamweb, and as such it relies heavily on writing and puzzles. In an interview with Stephen Marley for Retroaction, he stated that he was unhappy with the final product.

In this interview it was revealed that the game was initially entitled "Martian Gothic" but during the game's development the team referred to it as "Unification" based on one of the development team's favourite Star Trek episode of the same name, as it loosely fitted the theme of a point and click adventure game. This theme was eventually changed to a survival horror game, but it kept many of the item based puzzles from its original concept. As a result of both names a compromise was made to suffix Stephen's title "Martian Gothic" with "Unification" to create Martian Gothic: Unification.

There was also a significant downgrade of the textures for the PlayStation version, but it did allow the player to save game progress more often.

== Reception ==
Reception

Aggregate scores
Aggregator	Score	
Aggregator	PC	PS
GameRankings	59%	65%
Metacritic	N/A	64/100

Review scores
Publication	Score	
Publication	PC	PS
Adventure Gamers	1/5	N/A
AllGame	3.5/5	3.5/5
Computer Games Strategy Plus	3.5/5	N/A
Eurogamer	8/10	N/A
GamePro	3.5/5	N/A
GameSpot	5.6/10	5.9/10
GameSpy	50%	N/A
IGN	7.9/10	N/A
Official U.S. PlayStation Magazine	N/A	3.5/5
PC Gamer (US)	71%	N/A

The PlayStation version of Martian Gothic: Unification received "mixed" reviews according to the review aggregation website Metacritic. Duncan Turner of IGN said that the PC version had "a lot to offer...the story -- though seemingly cobbled together from many different sci-fi plots -- is engaging and keeps you guessing." Steve Smith of GameSpot stated the same console version was a "missed opportunity" as the designers had good ideas but did not mix the game elements into a balanced game." One of more positive reviews came from PlayStation Illustrated.
