= Julie Peasgood =

English actress (born 1956)

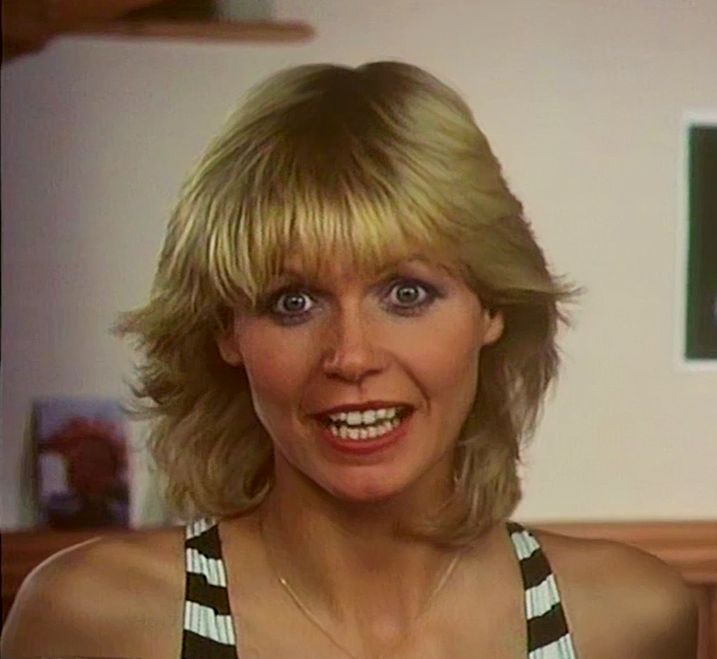
- Julie Peasgood in The Optimist (1985)
- Born: Julie May Peasgood; 28 May 1956 (age 70); Cleethorpes, Lincolnshire, England
- Occupations: Actress, television presenter, author
- Years active: 1970s–present
- Spouse(s): Peter McEnery (divorced); Dallas Smith (1987–1997, divorced); Patrick Pearson (1998–present)
- Children: 1
- Relatives: Emily Peasgood (niece)
- Website: http://www.juliepeasgood.com

Julie May Peasgood (born 28 May 1956 in Cleethorpes, Lincolnshire) is an English actress, television presenter, author and voiceover artist known for her distinctive voice.

She is best known for her role as Fran Pearson in the television soap Brookside (1991–93). She later played Jo Steadman in Emmerdale in 1997 and Jacqui Hudson in Hollyoaks from 2001 to 2002.

== Early life ==
Peasgood was born to working-class parents from Northern England. Her mother had started work as a tightrope walker and juggler in Bertram Mills Circus. There she had met her father Sid, who was a welfare officer for the Grimsby Dock Labour Board.

Peasgood was educated at Grimsby's Wintringham Grammar School, leaving at age 16. She had two elder sisters, who became teachers. She lived at 12 Lyndhurst Avenue.

After leaving school she worked in a fish and chip shop in Cleethorpes before training at the Arts Educational School in Golden Lane, London. She left the school shortly before her course finished to take the title role in 'Cherryripe and the Lugworm Digger', which was the first in the series 'Seven Faces of Woman' for ITV.

== Personal life ==
She is the mother of the actress Kate McEnery by her first marriage to Peter McEnery, whom she acted opposite in Ron Daniel's Royal Shakespeare Company production of Pericles in 1979. She has been married since 1998 to actor Patrick Pearson. Her niece, Emily Peasgood, is an Ivors Composers Awards winning composer and sound artist.

== Acting career ==
Peasgood was with the RSC for five years, where she played the role of Tilda (Matilda) Price in the original production of Nicholas Nickleby directed by Trevor Nunn. She was also in the production of Inadmissible Evidence, directed by John Osborne at the Royal Court, and has performed at the Old Vic, the Royal Exchange Theatre, Manchester, the Orange Tree and the West End.

On television she is probably most recognised for the roles of Fran Pearson in Brookside and Jo Steadman in Emmerdale. However, she has appeared in numerous other television series. Among her other credits include appearances in Hollyoaks where she played Jacqui Hudson, First Born, September Song, Taggart, A Woman's Guide to Adultery, Cherryripe and the Lugworm Digger, Carla Lane's Luv, Doctors, The Bill, Holby City, 4 Play, Spender, Ruth Rendell's Simisola, Dancers, This Year, Next Year, the original 1970s series of Survivors, Boon and Small World.

She appeared in the 1983 horror film House of the Long Shadows, which starred Peter Cushing, Vincent Price and Christopher Lee. In 1985 she featured in the dialogue-free television comedy seriesThe Optimist.

She started to do voice overs in the 1980s, and has voiced several hundred television and radio commercials. She is perhaps most well known in this role for a 1990s advert for Bird's Eye Frozen Peas. In 2003, Peasgood was known as the "queen of the ad voice overs".

On radio she has appeared in Galton and Simpson's Impasse on BBC Radio 2, in which she played Mrs Spooner, opposite Mitchell and Webb. She also played the leading role of Shirley in Venus to Go on BBC Radio 4.

== Presenting career ==
Peasgood is also a TV presenter, and won the Royal Television Society's TV Personality of the Year Award in 2004, for her series Great Little Breaks. Other credits include Bootsale Challenge, Loose Women, This Morning, Wish You Were Here...?, The Alan Titchmarsh Show, Turf Wars on UKTV Style,A Buyer's Guide to Spain on Real Estate TV which she wrote, directed and presented with her husband actor Patrick Pearson, and Crafty Beggars for TLC which she co-produced and co-presented with business partner Wendy Turner Webster (sister of TV personality Anthea Turner) being the first venture for their company Good Turn Productions.

== Other work ==
She contributed a vocal performance to Creative Reality's survival horror videogame Martian Gothic: Unification which was released in 2000. She later spoke out against violent video games, emphasising their negative effects, and attracted some criticism due to her contribution to Martian Gothic.

Her first book, The Greatest Sex Tips in the World, was launched at the London Book Fair on 16 April 2007 and went on to earn her Best Sex Writer Award from Scarlet Magazine. She currently has two regular magazine columns, is Contributing Editor of Cruise International magazine and writes about travel for a number of newspapers, magazines and websites.

Peasgood is also a public speaker and events host.

== Filmography ==
=== Film ===
Year	Title	Role	Notes
1975	The Romantic Englishwoman	New Nanny	
1978	The Lake	Barbara	Short
1983	House of the Long Shadows	Mary Norton	
2001	Hollyoaks: Indecent Behaviour	Jacqui Hudson (voice)	Video
2018	The Snarling	Verity Metcalfe	Completed

=== Television ===
Year	Title	Role	Notes
1974	Seven Faces of Woman	Gaye Kingdom	"Cherryripe and the Lugworm Digger"
1974	Sadie, It's Cold Outside	Cashier	"Pilot"
1975	A Journey to London	Miss Betty Headpiece	TV film
1975	The Five Red Herrings	Fenella Strachan	TV miniseries
1976	Survivors	Judy	"By Bread Alone"
1976	Clayhanger	Ada	TV series
1977	This Year Next Year	Kath Shaw	TV miniseries
1978	Play of the Month	Cherry	"The Beaux Stratagem"
1978	The Law Centre	Sheila Mitchell	TV series
1979	Everyday Maths		"Try It for Size"
1982	Play for Today	Kath	"Whistling Wally"
1985	The Optimist	Mimi	"The Brush Off"
1986	A Dangerous Kind of Love	Jenny	TV film
1987	Imaginary Friends	Joanna Onland	TV miniseries
1988	Small World	Cheryl Summerbee	TV miniseries
1988	First Born	Anne Forester	TV miniseries
1988	Brush Strokes	Jane	"3.3"
1989	4 Play	Hazel	"Chains of Love"
1989	Alas Smith and Jones		"The Unprepared Version"
1990	Boon	Sue Harper	"Burning Ambition"
1991	Van der Valk	Christina Molders	"Dangerous Games"
1991	Spender	Booney	"Iced"
1991	Perfect Scoundrels	Nelly	"No Thanks for the Memory"
1991	2point4 Children	Pauline	"Love and Marriage"
1991–1993	Brookside	Fran Matthews / Fran Pearson	Recurring role
1993	The 10%ers	Trudy	"Pilot"
1993	September Song	Roxy	Recurring role
1993	Taggart	Michelle Duncan	"Death Without Dishonour"
1993	A Woman's Guide to Adultery	Sandra	"1.1", "1.2", "1.3"
1993–94	Luv	Eden	Main role
1994	Chandler & Co.	Carmen Talbot	"On the Job"
1994	Murder Most Horrid	Waitress	"Smashing Bird"
1995	Bugs	Lena	"Pulse"
1995	Men of the World	Mandy	"The Girl I Love"
1995	The Bill	Mrs. Parsons	"Have a Go Hero"
1996	The Ruth Rendell Mysteries	Cookie Dix	"Simisola: Parts 2 & 3"
1997	Emmerdale	Jo Steadman	TV series
1999–2001	Hollyoaks	Jacqui Hudson	Regular role
2000	Martian Gothic: Unification	Harroway (voice)	Video game
2000	Holby City	Maddy Moorcroft	"Faith"
2001	Doctors	Mel	"Face Value"
2004	Holby City	Julie Sweeny	"When Lightning Strikes"
2004	Can't Buy Me Love	Janice	TV film
2006	Doctors	Ruth Farrell	"Second Best"
2007	The Bill	Dawn Collins	"480: The Good Old Days"
2008	Doctors	Eleanor Warden	"The Watcher"
2014	Casualty	Kayleigh French	"First Impressions"
2016	Casualty	Martha Cheney	"The Fear"
2019	Years and Years	Julie Peasgood	4 episodes
