= David Gregory-Kumar =

News correspondent

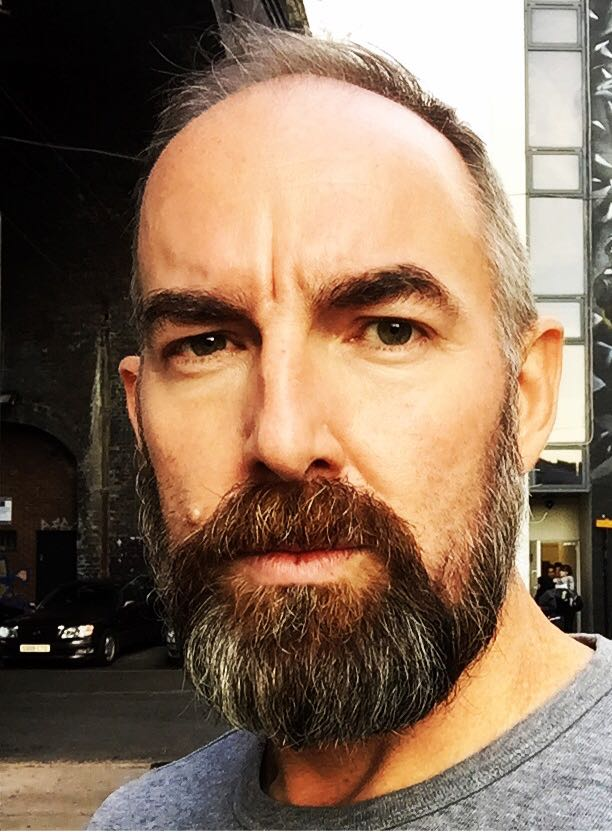
- Born: David Gregory
- Occupation: Journalist
- Employer: BBC
- Spouse: Suraj Kumar (m. 2016)
- Children: 1
- Website: bbc.co.uk/davidgregorykumar

David Gregory-Kumar (born David Gregory) is a news correspondent for BBC Midlands Today, covering the English midlands. He is the science and environmental correspondent.

After graduating from university, Gregory worked on his PhD in physics in Berlin, but largely in Daresbury just outside the city of Liverpool.

Gregory went on to work on the now defunct Science Line, Science Information Telephone Service.

Gregory had an interest in journalism, produced a regular newsletter while at university and went on to do freelance work for BBC Radio 5 Live. He then became 5 Live's science specialist for his first full-time role for the BBC.

He later joined BBC Midlands Today team as the regional science and environment correspondent, which he continues to do today. David Gregory also writes for BBC Online and works on BBC Radio with his reports usually on the local BBC radio stations in the West Midlands. On occasions, he has also co-presented the main edition of Midlands Today, the regional news programme Inside Out, and Radio 4's Farming Today.

In 2012, David Gregory entered into a Civil Partnership with his partner Suraj Kumar. This was converted into a marriage in March 2016, followed by a ceremony in New York in June 2016. The couple have hyphenated their surnames to both become Gregory-Kumar. They have a daughter Marnie.
