= Shefali Oza =

British television presenter (born 1967)

- Oza in 2026
- Born: 24 September 1967 (age 58); Mumbai, Maharashtra, India
- Occupations: Weather presenter, newsreader
- Years active: 1993–present
- Notable credit: Midlands Today
- Spouse: Jamie Knights (divorced)

Shefali Oza (born 24 September 1967) is a British TV personality and the main weather presenter on BBC Birmingham's Midlands Today, the regional news programme broadcast in the Midlands of England, but also carries out some news presentation work. She joined the programme in January 1993 as its first ever weather presenter.

== Career ==
Oza joined Midlands Today in 1993 as the programme's first weather presenter; since then, her role has included producing weather-related news and community features. She was awarded an Honorary Master's degree from University College Worcester in 2003, in recognition of her achievements in broadcasting.

Along with weather reporting and news presenting, Oza has fronted regional contributions to the BBC's live national programming and campaigns, such as Children in Need.

== Personal life ==
Before beginning her media career, Oza trained as a solicitor.

During her time on Midlands Today, Oza met her former husband Jamie Knights, who worked as her cameraman. Their wedding ceremony was featured on the news programme. The couple divorced two years later.
