= Pebble Mill Studios =

Former BBC television studios in Birmingham, England

Pebble Mill
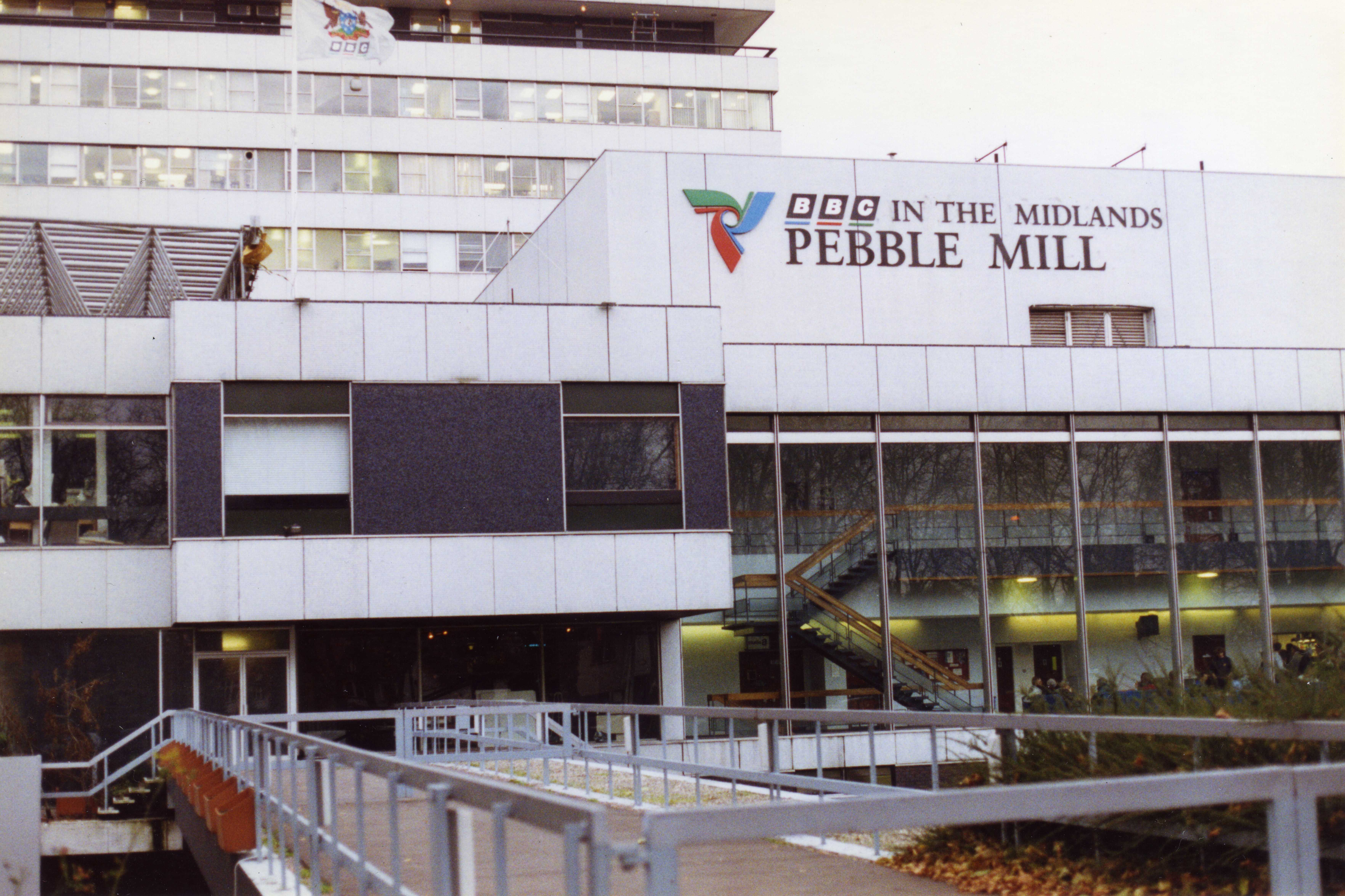
- The entrance in 1992

- Location within West Midlands county

General information
- Type: Television studio complex
- Location: Pebble Mill Road, Birmingham, England, UK
- Coordinates: 52.4505°N 1.9133°W
- Completed: 1971
- Opened: 10 June 1971
- Closed: December 2004
- Demolished: September 2005
- Owner: BBC

Pebble Mill Studios was the BBC's television studio complex located in Edgbaston, Birmingham, England, United Kingdom, which served as the headquarters for BBC Birmingham from 1971 until 2004. The nine-acre site was opened by Princess Anne on 10 June 1971, and in addition to the studios contained two canteens, a post office, gardens, a seven-storey office block, and an outside broadcasting (OB) base.

As well as being the home of Midlands Today and BBC Radio WM, programmes produced at Pebble Mill included Pebble Mill at One, The Archers, Top Gear, Doctors, Telly Addicts, Howards' Way, Juliet Bravo and Gardeners' World.

Pebble Mill Studios closed in 2004 and was demolished in September 2005; BBC Birmingham is now located in The Mailbox shopping complex in Birmingham city centre.

== Early history ==
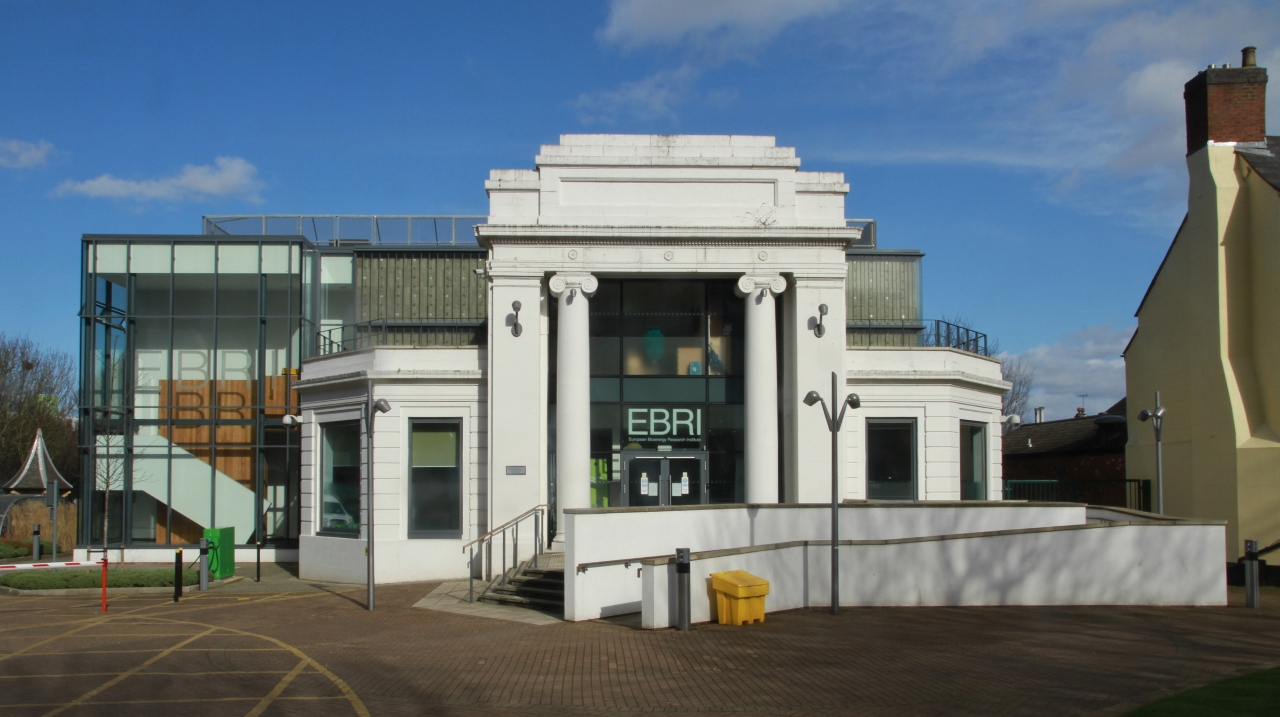
The front of the former Delicia Cinema on Gosta Green. The BBC turned the cinema into television studios after the Second World War and used it until Pebble Mill opened in 1971.

In the 1950s, BBC Midlands was based in offices on Carpenter Road, Edgbaston. The news studio was in a separate building in Broad Street, which remained in operation until 1971. In the same complex, the studios also recorded drama productions in the former Delicia Cinema in Gosta Green. Over time, these studios were too small for the expanding region and were hampered by being spread out across Birmingham.

A change in BBC policy created the BBC Regions, based in Manchester, Bristol, Cardiff, Glasgow and Belfast. These locations were created as 'National Production Centres', to produce television and radio productions for the areas in which they covered. Pebble Mill was designed to be an addition to London's Wood Lane Television Centre (TVC or TC).

The lease for the site was acquired from the Calthorpe Estate on a peppercorn rent by the BBC. Plans for Pebble Mill were approved in 1967. This followed construction of the studios, which was designed by John Madin, founder of the John Madin Design Group.

The site was built by Taylor Woodrow Construction.

== Television facilities ==
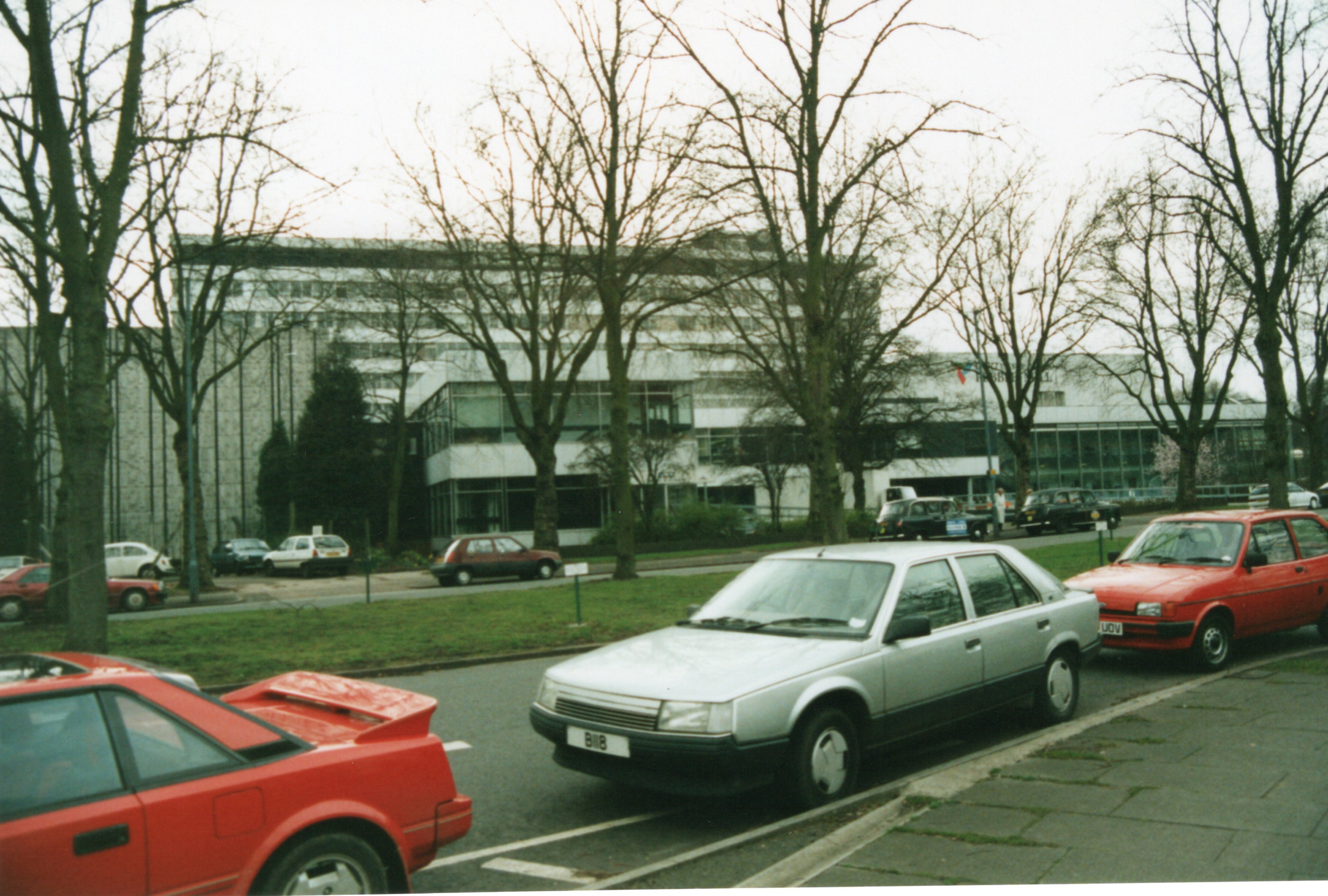
The complex seen in 1992

The original plan was to have a light entertainment studio (A) a regional news studio (B) and a drama studio (C) which was to be similar in size to TC6 at Television Centre.

=== Studio A ===
Studio A was the main studio 5,538 square feet (514.5 m^{2}) (78 ft × 71 ft within fire lanes) in size, with three separate control rooms looking onto the studio floor: a production gallery, a joint vision/lighting gallery and sound control gallery.

The studio opened with EMI 2001 cameras and was host to many programmes from London and locally produced programmes. Around 1982 the studios were rebuilt with more modern equipment and A was equipped with Link Electronics Ltd five 125 colour cameras and a pair of Ikegami HL79D portable cameras. The studio also found itself with a Grass valley Group 1600 series vision mixer and a Rank Strand Galaxy lighting console.

During the early 1990s, the BBC technical resource department toured the UK's other BBC, ITV and Channel 4 studios to find new cameras to replace the ageing Link Electronics Ltd 125 colour cameras. Sony Broadcast BVP-370 and 70Isp's were chosen following a side-by-side shoot-out from all the big-name manufacturers and against the advice of the London head of engineering. Also, during this period all asbestos was removed from the studio, gallery spaces and the air plant.

In November 1997, work began again on a major refurbishment of the studio, which included a production control room and a re-equipped sound control room. This £2.2 million upgrade took nine weeks and Studio A re-opened by the end of February 1998 as a fully digital widescreen facility – one of the first in the BBC.

=== Studio B ===
Studio B was for local news and sport programmes and was 40 × 25 ft in size. It had a combined control gallery with lighting, vision, production and sound all sited next to each other. This studio was used primarily for Midlands Today but also produced Network East and other regional programmes. Studio B was located on the first floor looking out over the central quadrangle. There was a cargo lift close to the studio doors but there was a very tight right-angle turn to get into the studio.

Next to the studio was the presentation suite that was used for short morning and evening news opt-outs. Originally control facilities were provided by Studio B's galleries but in the early 1990s a new presentation suite was built into spare space and provided an island studio with its own full production/lighting/sound control gallery.

=== Studio C (proposed) ===
Part of the original plan for the complex was for a second large Drama Studio with the same size as Television Centre's TC6 Studio. It would have had dimensions of 70 feet by 92 feet. It was intended to have it sit next to Studio A with the original TAR (Technical Apparatus Room)/Dimmer Room separating them and a slightly wider scenic workshop behind. When the circular multi-story car park, with its entrance from Bristol Road, got axed due to costs the BBC had decided not to add the extra studio space as well.

=== The Foyer/Studio C ===
The studio complex was originally intended to have a third 'drama' studio – but this never materialised. Instead, the main foyer became Studio C, as space was needed for the daytime magazine programme Pebble Mill at One.

The new studio was built into the real life 'foyer' which had to have its suspended ceiling removed and a scaffold lighting rig installed. Audience seating replaced the reception desk and interview seating installed by the main windows. Pebble Mill at One ended in 1986 but in 1988 its almost identical replacement Daytime Live was launched. It used the same format as Pebble Mill at One and used similar content.

In 1992, Good Morning with Anne and Nick (Anne Diamond and Nick Owen, both former TV-am presenters) replaced Daytime Live. Construction of a conservatory studio within the courtyard area was completed and was used for cooking items and interviews. The series ended in 1996 and Nick Owen became the main anchor on Midlands Today.

The daytime drama series Doctors was made between 2000 and 2004. The windows of the foyer were blacked out which was used to record the series; by then Studio A had closed. Doctors also used an additional space – radio Studio 1.

=== Presentation Suite ===
Next door to Studio B was the presentation suite that was used for short morning and evening news opt-outs. It could be entered directly by either a door from Studio B or from the outside corridor. Original control facilities were provided by Studio B's galleries but in the 1980s re-fit it gained its own control console and lighting. In the early 1990s a new presentation suite was built into spare space next pres. and provided an island studio with its own full production/lighting/sound control gallery and could operate a full daytime programme lineup of Studio B, C and Pres.

=== CAR/TAR (Central Apparatus Room/Technical Apparatus Room) ===
During the 1970s until the general refit in 1983 TAR was part of the technical rooms suite on the first floor adjoining Studio A. (This was to be the central technical link between Studio A and the original planned Studio C) This area housed the 'Line Up' desks for Studio A and B, as well as a maintenance area, the dimmer room for the studio production lighting systems and TV signal generation equipment.

When the 1983 refit began it was decided that a Central area should be built combining both Studio A and B's island desks and the new Studio C area. The new CAR/TAR was in the comms area which had shrunk due to new technology making switching even more compact. Around the late 1980s early 1990s Comms Centre moved again giving Services Department a new centralised service centre in the old vacant comms centre. The new services area contained work benches for all the disciplines (Comms, VT, camera, Vision and Lighting control), a camera test area and a small mechanical workshop (situated just above the north riser with Studio C directly below. Any work in the workshop had to stop during programmes as noise would travel straight into the foyer).

=== Rehearsal space ===
At the rear of the Outside Broadcast (OB) base was a small studio space called BORIS. This space was used as a rehearsal room and for a brief period of time using Studio C's gallery, was used for the early Sunday morning Farming programme which later on became Countryfile, presented by John Craven who had just stopped presenting Newsround and latterly as office space and storage.

=== Green room ===
The green room was part of an extension into open space by the driveway to the rear car park. This new extension included workshop space for the TV lighting department, an extension to the graphics department, production design and the green room for the daytime programmes produced at Pebble Mill.

== Post production, design, costume and make-up ==
=== Post production ===
The centre was also home to the largest and most advanced BBC post-production departments outside London, including six VT edit suites, two dubbing suites, a small viewing screen and a multitude of Avid non-linear suites. Following the 1983 refit a vast Graphics centre was opened in the old site of TAR and contained Aston caption generators, Rank Cintel Slide Files, Quantel Paintbox and Harry's and other graphic systems.

=== Costume ===
The Wardrobe/Costume department had its home in the studios central basement area just below the long glazed front window. There was a large work room with another work room containing cutting tables and sewing machines. There was also an office with several dressing rooms either side. There were also several large extras dressing rooms in the basement.

=== Design ===
Production Design Department had design offices in the central tower block until moving in the early 1990s to a new extension on spare land (originally intended for the early Light Entertainment Studio C) next to the road to the rear car park.

There were offices and work rooms for set and prop design located to the rear of the extension near to the construction workshop. On the ground floor were several props cages which contained all manner of items, even a Dalek.

=== Make-up ===
Make-up had a large purpose-built complex on the ground floor next to Studio A, with seating for 6 people and small office space at one end of the glassed gallery at the front of the building.

== Communications and signals ==
Pebble Mill formed part of the BBC's communications and transmission backbone. London's BBC Television Centre (TVC) had primary responsibility for most of the BBC's transmitted output and day to day transmission switching and presentation.

Pebble Mill was the Midlands Central Switching and Monitoring Centre, and would route national channels (two television, four national radio and local radio) to the Midland transmitters at Sutton Coldfield, Ridge Hill and The Wrekin and to other parts of the UK as well as acting as a national back up to TVC in case of emergencies.

== Outside broadcast – television and radio ==
In the late 1960s to the early 1990s, Pebble Mill had a fleet of 'Links' or scanner vehicles that were used to relay vision signals from outside broadcasts (OBs) back to the Communications Centre or 'Comms Centre' before being redistributed to London. All audio signals were sent via copper cable (Post Office/BT land lines). When satellite transmission of picture signals began in the mid-1990s, Pebble Mill gained satellite dishes and had fibre optics installed as permanent links to Birmingham's BT tower.

Pebble Mill had several scanner vehicles possibly dating back to World War II when it was a Royal Air Force (RAF) term for mobile radar vehicles which the GPO and BBC used after the war.

During the 1970s 'Comms Centre' was located in the 'Foyer' at Pebble Mill, but by the 1990s, Comms moved around the corner in the studio and was situated in the link area between Radio and TV.

=== Television ===
==== CMCR9 (Colour Midland 1) ====
CMCR9 was a Colour Outside Broadcast Unit built by PYE Electronics. This was a four camera vehicle and had a complement of 4 X Philips cameras. CMCR 9 is a Type 2 (CMCR9/C9, CM1 and North 3) originally had Pye cameras, but these had been removed after it was sold from the BBC. The BBC had started to fit it with EMI 2001 cameras, as originally fitted in the London units. CMCR9 would service big sports commitments and other large events around the Midland region. At some point the unit was transferred to the BBC Manchester Studios in Oxford Road, Manchester where it spent the rest of its working life. It and has now been restored to working order.

==== CM1 (Colour Midland 1) ====
CM1 was a Type 5 Scanner built by Link Electronics. This was an eight camera vehicle and had a complement of 5 X Philips LDK5 cameras. CM1 would service big sports commitments and other large events around the Midland region such as the snooker at Sheffield, Grand Prix from Silverstone Race Track, Songs of Praise and many others and it was an integral part of the BBC's nationwide TV OB fleet. Eventually CM1 was sold to ex-Pebble Mill OB crews who started Transvision Outside Broadcast.

==== CM 2 (Colour Midland 2) ====
CM2 was a 'Topical News & Drama', two-camera vehicle equipped with Philips LDK-14 cameras connected to LDK-5 CCUs (Camera Control Unit) and based on a Dennis TK chassis. In 1982, Boys from the Blackstuff, an English Regions Drama production, was shot on CM2 in Liverpool. The director, Philip Saville, was breaking many conventions including shooting wide-angles and close-ups at the same time).

==== CM 3 (Colour Mobile 3) ====
CM3 was a single camera vehicle based on a Renault Master van and was similar to modern SNG vehicles.

The TV OB Fleet was the first to succumb to the accountants’ spreadsheet logic, and its demise was the first tangible indicator of Pebble Mill’s televisual decline. The vehicles were sold off in 1992 despite being some of the most efficiently scheduled of the BBC’s entire OB Fleet.

=== Radio ===
==== Type B ====
Pebble Mill had a BBC Type-B vehicle which mainly tackled live religious programmes such as Radio 3's Choral Evensong, or Sunday Worship. A typical B-type, it featured a CALREC S-Series 40-channel sound desk with LS 5/8 speakers and nearfield monitoring. Birmingham's Type B is still operational from the Mailbox.

==== SCV6 ====
SCV6 was an articulated Sound Control Vehicle which managed Radio 1 and Radio 2's popular music OBs. As one of only two SCVs in the country, it was used for live and recorded shows. The SCV was fitted with an ageing SSL 4000 console (with automation) and a Pyramix digital multitrack system. It was replaced by new "Music Trucks" in 2010.

==== Type C ====
The Type-C ‘ice-cream van’ broadcast Any Questions? and sport, i.e. Test Match Special and athletics.

== Sound and radio ==
=== Local radio ===
The centre was responsible for a large output into mainstream network radio and was also home of the local radio station Radio WM. WM had studios on the first floor linking the Comms centre and the news room.

=== Radio studios ===
The two radio studios and Local Radio Operations Room overlooked the central courtyard and between them provided all of Radio WM's production base for 35 years. In addition to WM the complex also had some of the finest sound studios outside of Broadcasting House in London.

=== Studio 1 ===
Studio 1 was the main music studio at Pebble Mill with enough space to accommodate a full symphony orchestra. Initially it was used for sound recording sessions plus twice-weekly live broadcasts for Radio 3's lunchtime concerts. However, as well as radio this studio was equipped with a basic lighting grid and was used in its early years for the occasional television programme. The studio lighting was controlled from gallery 'C' from the summer of 1983.

However, John Birt's 'Producer Choice' agenda in the early 1990s forced Pebble Mill to charge unrealistic rental rates for the studio and made Studio 1 too expensive for radio use. Therefore, Radio 3 moved out to Adrian Boult Hall in the centre of the city, with the newly developed BBC Resources, turning Studio 1 into a full-time TV studio. A scene dock door was added together with the installation of a more comprehensive lighting grid. Soon after, Studio 1 was in daily use for the live transmission of The Really Useful Show. This lasted for three series, but it is understood that the long acoustic reverberation characteristics of the studio were not ideal for TV sound.

Programmes that originated from Studio 1 included Daily Live, Anything You Can Cook and Front Room. In its final years Studio 1 was used as a sound stage for Doctors, although the associated radio cubicle continued to be used to produce Radio 4's Farming Today until the closure of Pebble Mill as a whole in May 2004.

=== Studio 2 ===
Studio 2 was a large music studio with an SSL 4000 console and a reverb time of about half a second. This is where aspiring music balancers were trained. Studio 2 in the 1990s was used mostly by Radio 2 as its midland sessions studio and many popular musicians performed there. There isn't a music studio of any kind at Pebble Mill's replacement facility, The Mailbox.

=== Studio 3 and M3 ===
Pebble Mill's radio drama studio, Studio 3, provided much of Radio 3 and 4's drama output – it was the home of The Archers, the world's longest running radio soap opera. The last Archers programme from Pebble Mill was on 13 September 2004. The Mailbox (Pebble Mill's replacement) has a smaller radio drama studio, but incorporating a larger dead-room with an anechoic ‘snail’ for long, outdoor approaches. The Archers transferred to the Mailbox studio at the beginning of October 2004 and the drama studio was designed by Mark Decker. The adjacent facility (M3 – Midland 3) was a small edit studio and had a SADiE and was primarily used for editing The Archers, Radio 2's specialist music shows, and Radio 4's Midlands-based Features and Rural Affairs output.

=== Studio 4 and M4 ===
Studio 4 was the chassis of a studio that was never installed, but it had an edit suite associated with it called M4 (Midland 4) where most of the Radio Drama was edited. This is where the first AMS Audiofile DAW was used in radio and was then equipped with both Audiofile and SADiE in the mid-1990s.

=== Studio 5 ===
Studio 5 was the general purpose studio – over the years it was used for every form of feature or ‘strip’ programme, from Woman's Hour to Radio 2's Ed Stewart Show on Sunday afternoons. The studio was refurbished at least twice and was home to The Richard Bacon Show, live Saturday and Sunday nights on Radio 5. Radio 2's specialist popular music such shows as The Best of Jazz, Paul Jones, and Stuart Maconie's Critical List were recorded or transmitted from there as well.

=== Studio 6 ===
Studio 6 was not equipped until about 1995 but was where Radio 2 Through the Night originated, presented by Janice Long, Alex Lester and Mo Dutta. The Mailbox has facilities intended to replicate the functionality of Studios 5 and 6, as well as the M3 & M4 editing facilities.

=== Studio 7 ===
There was a seventh sound studio on the first floor adjoining the local radio studios. This studio was never commissioned: it was originally an office, and later became an electronics room for the communications (Comms) centre.

== Programmes ==
BBC Birmingham and BBC Midlands, from their initial conception, were to provide local interest and national programme output for the Midland Region. Over Pebble Mill's 35 years of operation the studios produced some of the BBC's most iconic programmes and was second to Television Centre for total output. The following is a small list of the total programme output of the complex. There were many single and short run documentaries, OBs and pilots which have come and gone over the years many of which will never be remembered.

=== Radio ===
Pebble Mill housed Radio West Midlands (Radio WM) but also produced programming for Radio 2, 3 and 4. Most of Radio 4's 1990s dramas came from Pebble Mill. Radio programming included over the years Woman’s Hour, The Ed Stewart Show on Sunday afternoons. The Richard Bacon Show, live Saturday and Sunday nights on Radio 5. Radio 2’s specialist popular music shows such as Best of Jazz, Paul Jones, Stuart Maconie’s Critical List and Radio 2's Through the Night, presented by Janice Long, Alex Lester and Mo Dutta. The world's longest running radio soap, The Archers, was produced in Studio 3.

=== Television ===
==== News and documentary ====
News and documentary programming included Midlands Today, the midlands region news programme, Inside Out, Points of View, and The Chequered Flag, about the history of motor sports. The John Gau Productions/CBS/TBS coproduction Reaching For the Skies was a documentary series on the history of aviation. Also in the 1990s a news department programme, The Midlands at Westminster, a local politics strand, broadcast at Sunday lunch time on BBC 2.

==== Light entertainment ====
Light entertainment included Telly Addicts, Top Gear Motorsport, Noel's Addicts, The Great Egg Race with Professor Heinz Wolff, a series of 2point4 Children, An Actors Life, The Golden Oldie Picture Show, May to December, Don't Wait Up, Going for a Song (the 1990s version) and Call My Bluff (1997–2005 revival). It also included Can't Cook Won't Cook, A Song for Christmas, The Basil Brush Show (1970s version) and Best of Brass, a brass band competition.

==== General interest ====
The Clothes Show, Gardeners World, local music programme Look! Hear!, On the House a series on DIY where an entire house was built from the foundations up and the work done inside the house presented by Harry Greene and Pattie Coldwell. Countryfile, Farming, Kick Start, Junior Kick Start. Pebble Mill also developed lifestyle programming with Style Challenge and To Buy or Not to Buy.

BBC Birmingham was also responsible for a popular BBC2 programme for much of the 1970s-1990s the Snooker programme Pot Black, which was generally shown most Fridays throughout the year at 9pm on BBC 2.

==== Drama ====
Throughout its 35-year history Pebble Mill productions of BBC drama was extensive.

Morgan's Boy, Rose for Winter, Jane Eyre, Fosdyke Saga, Airbase, Tycoon, Bird of Prey, and A Very Peculiar Practice (first series). Owen MD, Lord Peter Wimsey played by Ian Carmichael, and Diary of a Madman. Episodes of Z-Cars, The Moonstone, The Roses of Eyam, Prometheus, Sophia and Constance,Second City Firsts, The Battle of Waterloo starring Warren Clarke, Poldark, Martin Chuzzlewit, and Angels, Shakespeare plays, Dalziel and Pascoe, and Vanity Fair (1987).

==== Soap operas and serials ====
A series of Pobol Y Cwm in the early 1970s, Doctors, Dangerfield, Trainer, Kinsey, Triangle, Doctor Who serial Horror of Fang Rock in 1977, All Creatures Great and Small, Howards' Way, Juliet Bravo, This Life, The Brothers starring Jean Anderson, and Spy Trap. Pebble Mill produced Specials a short series about a group of Special Police Officers in a fictional Midlands town. and the anthology series The Afternoon Play.

==== Children's ====
Children's content includes Rentaghost, one series of Hartbeat with Tony Hart, its replacement SMart, The Adventure Game, and some of Bodger & Badger (episodes of which were also recorded inside TC7 in BBC Television Centre). There were also editions of Play School and Jackanory.

==== Asian Unit ====
During the early 1960s BBC Birmingham pioneered television programmes for the Asian community. These were presented and produced by Mahendra Kaul, directed by Ashok Rampal and broadcast on Sunday mornings. Apna Hi Ghar Samajhiye ("Make Yourself At Home") aired on Sundays at 9 am for half an hour. Empire Road (1978–79), written by Michael Abbensetts was a drama series about the African Caribbean and Asian communities which was shown on BBC 2. During the late '70s and '80s Network East was produced in Studio A and B, consisting of music and interviews.

==== Daytime television ====
BBC Birmingham utilised the main foyer of Pebble Mill for television entertainment and magazine programmes, mostly for BBC1. One fixture of the schedule, Pebble Mill at One was an early afternoon show, though it started originally on BBC2. The idea to use the reception and foyer for programmes was borne out of the fact, all the other studio space were either fully used for Birmingham produced, or for BBC TV's network needs for the various London based programme departments. Pebble Mill at One ran from 1972 until 1986, was then one of few daytime magazine programmes, hence its success at the time.

There was at least one Pebble Mill spin-off during the 1970s, when BBC1 rested its main Saturday chat show, Parkinson. BBC Birmingham was commissioned to produce a late night chat show. Saturday Night at the Mill, was the result and Kenny Ball and his Jazzmen were the regular house band; they performed the show's signature tune. The programme was directed and produced in Birmingham by Roy Norton and Roy Ronnie. In 1981 an early evening version of a hit BBC1 show from the sixties called Six Five Special resurfaced during the Mill's summer break, presented by Donny MacLeod and Marian Foster.

The Pebble Mill format returned in 1988 as Daytime Live, renamed Scene Today, and followed by Good Morning with Anne and Nick, both broadcast from Studio C. Pebble Mill was resurrected in 1991 and aired from Studio A, presented by Alan Titchmarsh and Judi Spiers in a format similar to Pebble Mill at One.

== Closure of Pebble Mill and move to The Mailbox ==
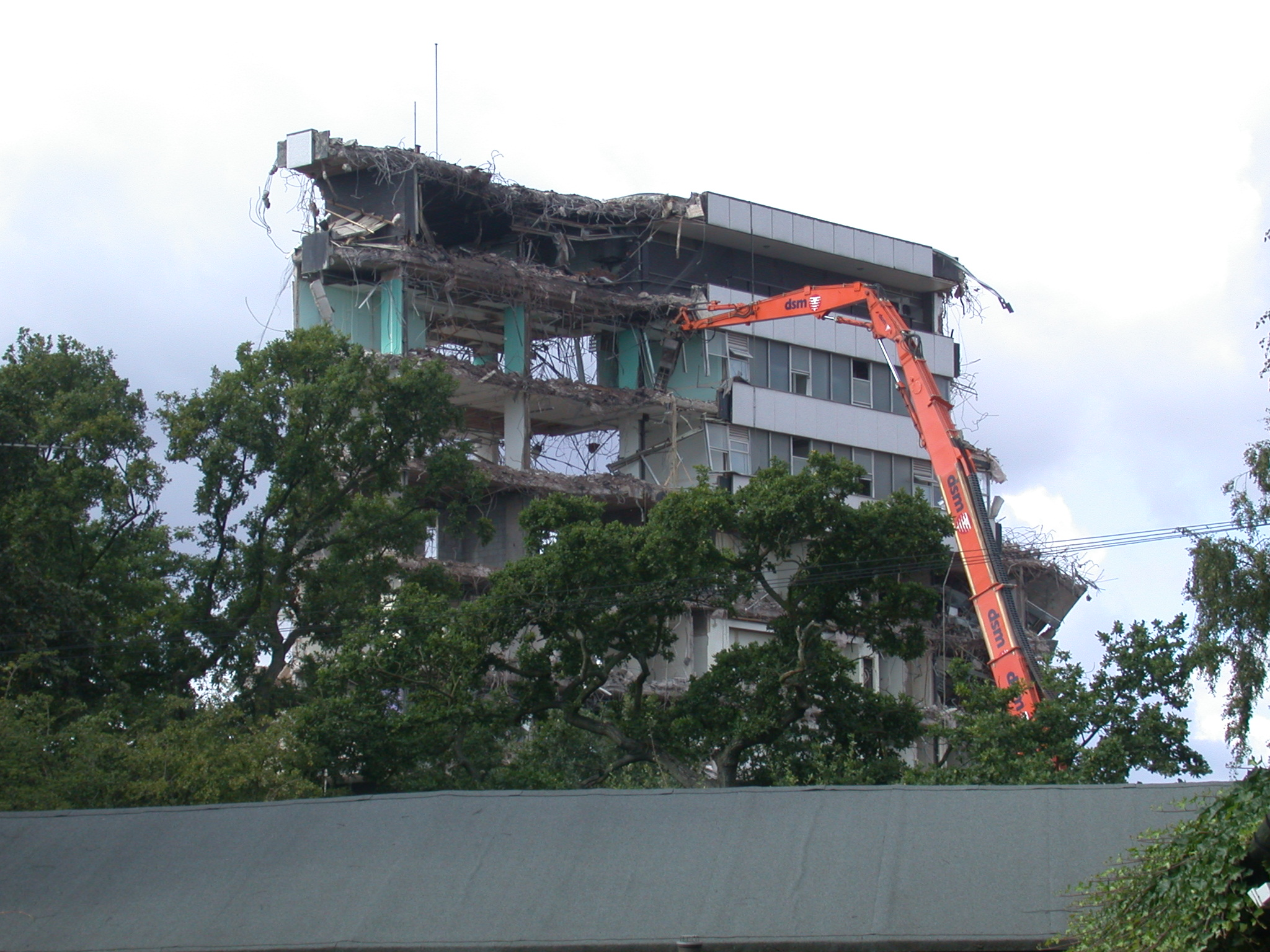
Demolition in progress, September 2005

Due to problems with the lease and to changes in the way television was produced, as well as the fact that some sections of the building were suffering from concrete cancer, the BBC made the decision to relocate to new facilities. Most departments moved to The Mailbox in Birmingham City Centre, but the drama department went to the newly created BBC Drama Village at the Selly Oak campus of the University of Birmingham. The Mailbox has facilities intended to replicate the functionality of Studios 3, 5 and 6, as well as the M3 & M4 editing facilities. The transfer was completed on 22 October 2004, 33 years after Pebble Mill opened.

Remaining fixtures, furniture and technical equipment were auctioned off at Pebble Mill a few weeks later. The studios were demolished the following summer, with developers at the time planning to build a technology and science park on the site. Instead, construction of a new Birmingham Dental Hospital started there in 2014, and the facility opened in 2016. On another part of the site, a hospital was built for Circle Health in 2020.
