= DreamWeb =

1994 video game

Dreamweb
- Cover art
- Developer: Creative Reality
- Publisher: Empire Interactive
- Designers: Neil Dodwell; David Dew
- Platforms: MS-DOS, Amiga 500/600/1200
- Release: 1994
- Genre: Adventure
- Mode: Single-player

Dreamweb is an MS-DOS and Amiga point-and-click cyberpunk top-down adventure game released in 1994, developed by Creative Reality and published by Empire Interactive Entertainment. The game features mature themes and a dark plot filled with violence and brief full frontal nudity, a rarity for games at the time.

Dreamweb was re-released as freeware in October 2012.

== Overview ==
The opening credits are reminiscent of Ridley Scott's Blade Runner. In addition to a similar typeface, the credits are displayed in white on black, with a loud metallic noise followed by a fade out, and the title appears in red on black. Much of the look and feel of the game is reminiscent of Blade Runner, while also drawing influence from the cyberpunk genre.

Dreamweb's musical score, composed by Matthew Seldon and Steve Boynton, is highly regarded, contributing to the atmosphere which made the game admired by many at the time; the DOS-only CD version had an extra audio track. The dark story also received praise. The original game included a booklet entitled Diary of a (Mad?) man, written by Stephen Marley, which has a far more layered and atmospheric 'prequel' story than the one in the game itself. The diary also supplies more background info on main character Ryan (and served as a copy-protection method).

The game was criticized for its poor top-down view and overlooking many conventions commonly observed in adventure games; for instance, while the player can examine and pick up most objects on-screen, the majority of them serve no purpose other than to take up inventory space. The inability to control the course of conversations was also seen as a flaw.

Some puzzles, although logical, are simplistic - while in many adventure games of the time (even more adult adventures) the solution to bypassing an NPC generally involved giving them an object, Dreamweb puts an emphasis on gunplay and the killing of several characters, sometimes with gory results. It was also one of the first mainstream games to feature an uncensored sex scene, which was quite controversial at the time of release.

Dreamweb had two releases on the Amiga. The AGA version had 256 color graphics and an extra song over the standard version. A PC version was released, first on disk format. The Amiga version features a moody electronic soundtrack; the PC version is similar in style, although some of the compositions are different. The music is primarily short, looping, streaming sound files, with the PC version's being more advanced, although they suffer from low-fi encoding. A CD version was also released for the PC, which included full voice acting.

== Synopsis ==
Ryan is a bartender living in a futuristic dystopian city. Looking to find some peace of mind, he purchases a leather-bound journal and begins to recount the events of his life; he finds himself plagued by a series of violent and disturbing dreams revolving an entity known only as the Dreamweb, the spiritual threads controlling reality, and a group of seven individuals tampering with it. The volume and brutality of the dreams place strain on both his mental health and relationship with his higher-class girlfriend, Eden. As his mental health continues to deteriorate, he finds himself cutting the words 'Diary of a (Mad?) Man' onto the cover his journal. Wishing for the dreams to stop, Ryan sets out to kill seven targets seen often in his dreams, proclaiming in his journal, '[It's] like killing Hitler.'

Ryan sets out to find his first target, David Crane. Using his severance paycheck (after being fired from his job for failing to be consistently punctual), he purchases a laser pistol from an arms dealer and books a room in the hotel Crane is staying at for a nearby concert. Breaking into the hotel's penthouse floor, he kills his guards before interrupting Crane during sex. Crane recognizes Ryan's objective, and Ryan kills him. A glowing orb pops out of Crane after his death, and Ryan is transported back to the Dreamweb, where he is given his next target, Sterling, a general. Ryan breaks into a sound stage where Sterling is being featured as a guest on a talk show and kills him on live television by dropping lighting equipment on his head; this, ironically, causes the station's ratings to spike.

Ryan's third target is Sartain, Eden's boss. Using information found in Eden's apartment, he tracks down Sartain, and, after finding a document on one of his guards, learns of the identities of the four remaining individuals conspiring to take over the Dreamweb. As Sartain attempts to escape in his hover car, Ryan shoots it down, incinerating him in the process. The fourth name on Ryan's list is Julliet Chappel, who is attempting to distance herself from the three other remaining individuals to avoid being targeted. Before Ryan can reach her, a bomb planted in her house detonates, killing her. Finding a data cartridge among the ruins of her house, Ryan picks up a half-burnt cartridge from the ruins and returns home, where from reading its contents, he discovers the location of her church.

Unable to get inside the church, he pursues Diane Underwood, who is in a heavily guarded beach house. Ryan sabotages her security system, which triggers an explosion that grants him entry. Ryan confronts Underwood, bisected but alive, and learns about "Project 7". At the behest of Underwood's desperate pleading, Ryan executes her. Back in the Dreamweb, he learns the remaining two evil are growing more powerful with each successive death of the members.

Arriving at the church and making his way into its secret underground passages, he finds the deceased, deformed body of Father O' Rourke, which leaves only one living member: Dr. Beckett, who is revealed to be The Dealer, the city's most prolific serial killer. Beckett monologues about rebirth before chasing Ryan, only to be killed by an oncoming train. Ryan returns to the Dreamweb, where he is thanked by the master monk, but also learns his fate. He returns to the real world for the last time, where he is shot dead by the police for his numerous crimes. Ryan's last vision is of his soul entering the Dreamweb.

== Development ==
The biggest influence for the game was the 1986 film Highlander. The developers applied the concept of seven deadly sins to the game in the form of Ryan's victims. The ending to the booklet Diary of a (Mad?) man was intentionally left ambiguous. Dialog trees were never considered to be part of the game because David Dew did not particularly like the mechanic. In 1995, DreamWeb was refused classification in Australia, due to a rock star showing his penis in the game. Underpants were added to the rock star and the game was resubmitted in the same year for an M rating.

== Reception ==
Reception

Review scores
Publication	Score
Adventure Gamers	1.5/5
Dragon	1.5/5
Jeuxvideo.com	15/20
Quandaryland	1/5
Pelit	91/100
NTSC-uk	7/10
Power Play	85%

The game was reviewed in 1995 in Dragon #215 by Jay & Dee in the "Eye of the Monitor" column. Both reviewers gave the game 1½ out of 5 stars.

DreamWeb also received negative 2000s reviews from Austin Boosinger of Adventure Gamers (1½ out of 5 stars), Rosemary Young of the now defunct Quandaryland website gave it 1 out of 5 stars.

Positive reviews were given by Tapio Salminen of the Finnish video games magazine Pelit (91 out of 100), Jamie Davies of the now defunct NTSC-uk website (7 out of 10), the French gaming website JeuxVideo (15 out of 20) and the video games magazine Power Play (85% out of 100%). Will Groves reviewed the game for PC Gamer, and while praising the "atmospheric gameworld" he noted that the game felt "irretrievably old fashioned" concluding that while it was not a bad game it was a style of title that had been done many times before and offered nothing novel.
