= Kay Alexander =

British regional BBC television newsreader (born 1950)

Kay Alexander MBE
- Born: 4 June 1950 (age 76); Aldershot, Hampshire, England
- Occupation: Television presenter
- Spouse: Brian Conway
- Children: 2

Kay Alexander MBE (born 4 June 1950) is a retired British regional BBC television newsreader, best known for presenting Midlands Today.

== Early life ==
Alexander was born and brought up in Aldershot in Hampshire. Her mother was a doctor, her father was an aeronautical engineer, and she has two brothers. After attending the independent Frensham Heights School, Alexander read English at the University of Birmingham, gaining a degree in 1973. She started a PGCE course that she did not complete.

== Career ==
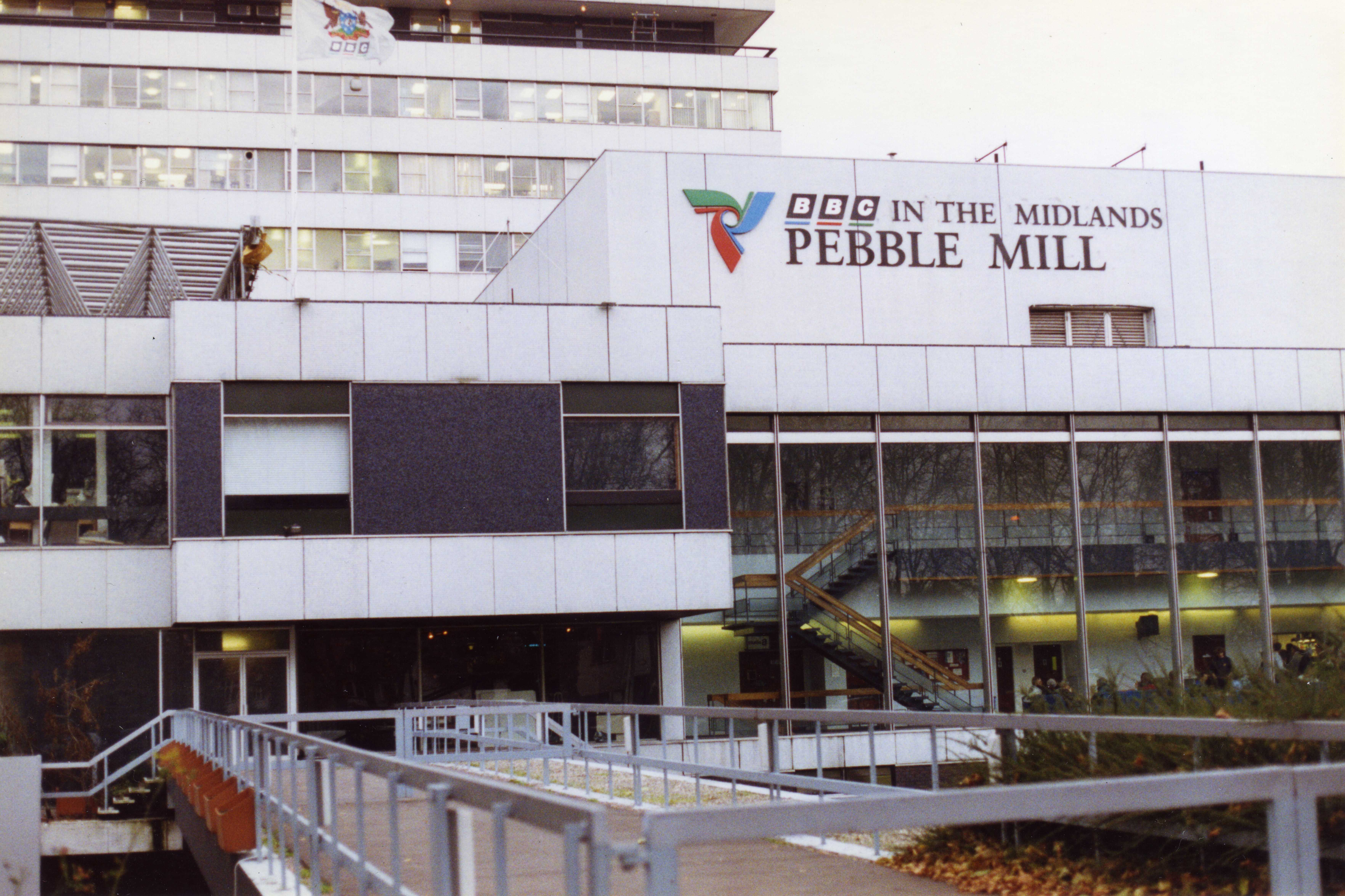
Pebble Mill in 1992

Alexander initially worked for BBC Radio 4 at Pebble Mill where she worked on You and Yours, Checkpoint and Woman's Hour.

She then worked on BBC Midlands Today from the 1970s, at one time being a main anchor. In 1992, she left the evening slot and mainly presented the breakfast and lunchtime bulletins, three days a week. Her regular co-presenters included Tom Coyne, Alan Towers, Sue Beardsmore and David Davies. In October 2003, the Royal Television Society presented her with a Special Award to mark thirty years in television.

Alexander retired after presenting her last news bulletin on Midlands Today's lunchtime news on 30 October 2012, and the next evening appeared on air for the last time to receive her colleagues' congratulations. She presented a report about the 50th anniversary of the television programme Gardeners' World that appeared on Midlands Today on 16 June 2017 and was repeated several times on 18 June 2017 on the BBC News Channel.

In 1995, she narrated the Video 125 "Drivers' Eye View" of the Birmingham Cross-City line.

== Personal life ==
Alexander was chair of the Birmingham Assay Office (the first woman to hold the position) until 2012. During that time, she became a Freeman of the Worshipful Company of Goldsmiths and a Freeman of the City of London. She is a former director of the Birmingham Hippodrome and a patron of Acorns Children's Hospice, the Mary Ann Evans Hospice, cancer charity Breast Friends and now Age UK Birmingham and Age UK Sandwell.

Alexander was appointed Member of the Order of the British Empire (MBE) in the 2013 Birthday Honours for services to broadcasting and to charity in the West Midlands.

On 1 October 1988, Alexander married Brian Conway, a Radio Leicester breakfast radio presenter and a presenter on the East Midlands slot on Midlands Today from 1984 to 1990, at Birmingham Register Office. Her husband left the BBC in 1990 to pursue a career in public affairs and corporate communications with Birmingham Airport and Manchester Airports Group.

Her first husband in 1970, when she was 20, was Frank Wibaut, a professor at the Royal Academy of Music, who grew up near her, in Runfold. She had a daughter in July 1976, who was born seven weeks early, and a son in September 1978.

In the 1980s, she lived in the Birmingham suburb of Edgbaston. She lives in Warwickshire.
