= Raymond Witch =

- Born: 6 October 1927; Kent, England
- Died: 10 December 2009 (aged 82); London, England
- Occupations: Actor; theatre director
- Years active: 1950–1993
- Spouse: Svandís Jónsdóttir

Raymond Herbert Witch (6 October 1927 – 10 December 2009) was an English theatre, motion picture and television actor.

== Biography ==
Witch was born to parents Herbert Witch and Nellie Witch (née Gilbert) on 6 October 1927 in the village of Kingston, Kent located in South East England. Herbert, a postman, served in the Royal Artillery during World War I, was wounded in action, and later married Nellie after his demobilization in 1918.

In June 1963 Witch married Svandís Jónsdóttir who had originally travelled from Iceland to study acting in London. The two spent some time in Iceland during the early 1960s in way of a honeymoon before returning to London.

== Career ==
Witch trained as an actor at the Royal Academy of Dramatic Art (RADA). Beginning as a chorus member or background character in simple pantomimes, such as Cinderella in 1953, he was also successful in obtaining a number of more active acting roles during his career, including in the original West End production of Irma la Douce in 1958.

Essentially a dramatic actor, Witch made a successful move to television in which he obtained over 50 small supporting roles, including the series A Question of Guilt, A Bunch of Fives, Tom Brown's Schooldays, Adelaide Bartlett and Z Cars.

Although primarily an actor for television Witch obtained roles in the made for television movies The Great Escape II: The Untold Story (1988), Events in a Museum (1983), The Room (1991) and The Trip North (1991).

== Later life ==
Although married, Witch had no children. He lived alone, while his wife, suffering Alzheimer's, was taken into care. He visited her daily and was an active member of the South Bloomsbury Tenants and Residents Association (formerly the Bury Place Residents Association). Following a series of hospital visits after a fall at his home, Witch died in London from a heart attack and severe infection. His health suffered by what was seen as poor medical care given to him at the time. Svandís died at her nursing home in May 2012.

== Filmography ==
Year	Title	Role	Notes
1988	The Great Escape II: The Untold Story	Churchill's Footman	TV movie
