= Daljinder Singh Virdee =

British pharmacist (born 1990)

Major Daljinder Singh Virdee (born March 1990) is a pharmacist, British Army officer, and chairman of the Defence Sikh Network (DSN), who campaigned for the re-introduction of Nitnem Gutkas, Sikh daily prayer books, into the British military.

== Early life ==
Daljinder Singh Virdee was born March 1990. He acquired his Master of Pharmacy degree from the University of Reading in 2012.

== Career ==
Virdee worked as technical services pharmacist at Guy's and St Thomas' Hospital in London, before embarking on a four-week intensive course for professionally qualified officers (PQO) at the British Army's Royal Military Academy at Sandhurst. He passed-out as a Lieutenant in 2015. Chairman of the Defence Sikh Network (DSN), Virdee has campaigned for the re-introduction of a Nitnem Gutkas, a Sikh daily prayer book, into the British military, which was last issued over a century ago. On 28 October 2022, the book was handed out at the Central Gurdwara temple in London. In November 2022, Virdee presented a copy of the new prayer book and other Sikh literature in a ceremony at the Golden Temple as part of a delegation of British military personnel to Amritsar to participate in an event in memory of the Battle of Saragarhi. The DSN has also advised on the different colours used for turbans in the three branches of the British military. In October 2022, Virdee represented the Defence Sikh Network at a ceremony in Thetford to honour Duleep Singh at St. Andrew and St. Patrick Church, Elveden, Suffolk.
