= Sue Beardsmore =

English presenter

- Born: Susan Rita Beardsmore; 19 February 1955 (age 71); Bedford, Bedfordshire, England
- Occupations: television presenter, freelance media trainer

Susan Rita Beardsmore (born 19 February 1955) is a former BBC television presenter who fronted the regional news programme Midlands Today for twenty years.

== Early life ==
Born in Bedford, Beardsmore attended the independent Dame Alice Harpur School in her hometown, then studied for a BA in English and Politics at the University of Newcastle upon Tyne and also went to Luton College of Higher Education.

== Career ==
Beardsmore joined the BBC in 1977 as secretary to the Manager of Operations and later worked as a production assistant on the children's television programme Blue Peter. She became the first presenter of the Midlands news opt-outs for Breakfast Time in 1983 before becoming a main presenter of Midlands Today in 1987. She regularly presented the flagship 6:30pm programme with presenters such as Kay Alexander, Alan Towers, David Davies and Nick Owen. She left the programme in February 2003 and worked as the public space co-ordinator at BBC Birmingham in the city's Mailbox complex.

After retirement from the BBC Beardsmore worked as a freelance media trainer. She also goes to schools to teach people newspaper skills and making newspapers. When BBC radio internet broadcasts of live events (e.g. football matches) breach copyright guidelines, an announcement voiced by Sue is played instead.

Beardsmore has served as a trustee of the National Lottery Heritage Fund. In 2022 she became chair of the Board of Trustees of the Birmingham Botanical Gardens.
