= Sarah Bishop =

British television presenter

- Born: Leamington Spa, Warwickshire, England
- Other names: Sarah Falkland
- Occupations: Journalist, newsreader, television presenter
- Notable credit(s): BBC Hereford and Worcester; BBC CWR; Midlands Today; The Politics Show

Sarah Bishop (previously Falkland) is a journalist on British television working as a reporter and newsreader on BBC Midlands Today for the West Midlands Region.

== Career ==
Before joining Midlands Today, she worked as Sarah Falkland for the BBC's Hereford and Worcester, Coventry and Warwickshire and WM local radio stations.

Currently, Sarah Bishop reports frequently from the Warwickshire and Worcestershire areas, as well as presenting various short bulletins and regularly covering as a main presenter on the flagship 6:30pm weekday programme. Up until December 2009, she was also one of two presenters for the weekly Politics Show opt-out in the West Midlands. Sarah has recently been seen as a reporter on BBC Breakfast. Sarah left the BBC in November 2019.
