= BBC Drama Village =

Television production facility in the United Kingdom

- Location within West Midlands county

General information
- Type: Television production
- Location: BBC Drama Village, 1059 Bristol Road, Birmingham, B29 6WE, United Kingdom
- Coordinates: 52°25′59″N 1°56′54″W
- Current tenants: BBC Birmingham, BBC Studios
- Inaugurated: 10 May 2005

The BBC Drama Village was a television production facility run by the BBC. It was operated by BBC Birmingham and latterly BBC Studios. It was based largely at the Selly Oak campus of the University of Birmingham in Birmingham, England.

The centre consisted of five buildings. Archibald House and Melville House are Grade II listed Arts and Crafts movement-style former college buildings on the university campus. There were also three units on an industrial estate in nearby Stirchley. Facilities included studios and sets, wardrobe and technical departments and extensive post-production suites.

The site closed with the cancellation of Doctors in 2023, with staff relocated to alternative premises at Heath Mill Lane in Digbeth.

== Programmes ==
Programmes made on the site have included:

- The Afternoon Play
- The Coroner
- Dalziel and Pascoe
- Doctors
- Father Brown
- WPC 56
