= Suzanne Virdee =

British journalist and television presenter

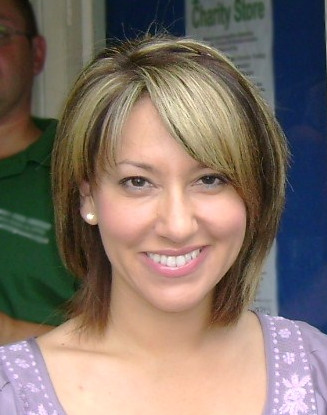
- In 2008
- Born: Suzanne Nicole Virdee; 16 October 1969 (age 56); Solihull, Warwickshire, England
- Occupations: Broadcaster, journalist, newsreader
- Years active: 1987–present
- Employer: ITN (2016–present)
- Spouse: Andrew Fox (m. 1996)

Suzanne Nicole Virdee (born 16 October 1969 in Solihull, Warwickshire, now the West Midlands) is a British journalist and television presenter, working on a freelance basis with UK news organisation ITN.

== Early life ==
Virdee was born on 16 October 1969 in Solihull, Warwickshire, now the West Midlands, to an Indian father and an English mother and grew up in Edgbaston. She was educated at Edgbaston's Park Grove School and studied at Mander Portman Woodward College.

== Career ==
Virdee became a journalist at the age of 18, working as a trainee reporter at the Solihull Times in her home town. She passed her journalism exams and switched to television journalism, working for Central News in Birmingham. Virdee went on to work for the Sunday Mercury and the Birmingham Mail (then the Birmingham Evening Mail) before a 16-month stint with BBC Radio WM.

She returned to Central News as a reporter, presenter and producer before joining the BBC's Midlands Today programme in April 2001, presenting late night bulletins before becoming a main presenter a year later, alongside Nick Owen. Virdee has also worked as a relief presenter for BBC Breakfast.

On 29 March 2012, Virdee left Midlands Today after announcing she was unable to sign a five-month contract to continue presenting the programme. The BBC took Virdee off air two days earlier than planned after she released a press statement about her departure.

In August 2016, she joined ITN as a news correspondent for the ITV Lunchtime News and early newsreader for ITV News London. On 25 May 2017 she made her debut fronting short updates for 5 News and covered bulletins for ITV news.

== Personal life ==
Virdee has been married to photographer Andrew Fox since 1996. They live in Redditch, Worcestershire.
