= BBC Midlands Today =

British TV news programme (since 1964)

- Title card used since April 2022
- Theme music composer: David Lowe
- Country of origin: United Kingdom
- Original language: English

Production
- Producers: BBC News; BBC West Midlands
- Production locations: The Mailbox, Birmingham
- Camera setup: Multi-camera
- Running time: 30 minutes (main 6:30 pm programme); 10 minutes (1:30 pm and 10:30 pm programmes); Various (on weekends and Breakfast)

Original release
- Network: BBC One West Midlands
- Release: 28 September 1964 – present

Related
- BBC News; East Midlands Today; ITV News Central; The Midland

BBC Midlands Today is the BBC's regional television news service for the West Midlands. It was launched in 1964 and is presented by Mary Rhodes, Nick Owen, Ben Godfrey, Elizabeth Glinka, Rebecca Harper and Shefali Oza.

== Overview ==
Midlands Today is produced by BBC Midlands and broadcasts on BBC One seven days a week. The programme is produced and broadcast from the BBC studios in The Mailbox, Birmingham. Journalists are also based at newsrooms in Coventry, Shrewsbury, Stoke-on-Trent, Worcester and Gloucester.

The programme began on 28 September 1964, broadcasting from a small room in the Birmingham Register Office before moving to the custom-built Pebble Mill broadcasting centre in Edgbaston on 10 November 1971. It remained there until the studios closed on 22 October 2004 when the BBC Birmingham operations were switched to the current studios at The Mailbox.

Until 1991, the programme also served the East Midlands, which has since received its own BBC regional TV news programme, East Midlands Today. The programme's editorial area consists of the West Midlands, Warwickshire, Staffordshire, Shropshire, Herefordshire, Worcestershire and northern Gloucestershire (even though Gloucestershire is not formally within the Midlands, being in the South West England region – it is also covered by BBC Points West).

Midlands Today is broadcast from the Sutton Coldfield transmitter in the West Midlands and can be watched in any part of the UK on Sky, Freesat and in the rest of Europe via Astra 2E. The latest edition is also available to view again on the Midlands Today website and on BBC iPlayer.

Freeview viewers in northern Staffordshire around Kidsgrove and Biddulph cannot receive signal from the Sutton Coldfield transmitter; instead, they receive better signal from the Winter Hill transmitter that broadcasts North West Tonight from Salford. However, those areas can still watch Midlands Today on Channel 101, which broadcasts the BBC One West Midlands variant on Sky and Freesat by default.

Even though viewers in northern Oxfordshire around Banbury are served by South Today, the town can also receive Midlands Today from a local relay transmitter that is transmitted from the Sutton Coldfield transmitter.

Viewers in North West Leicestershire and Swadlincote in Derbyshire receive Midlands Today on Freeview as local news meaning those areas receive better signals from the Sutton Coldfield transmitter rather than Waltham transmitter.

Eastern parts of the Powys area in Wales, such as Presteigne, cannot receive signals from the Carmel transmitter; instead, they get better signals from the Ridge Hill transmitter, which broadcasts Midlands Today.

On 6 February 2023, a new studio upgrade was revealed resembling that of Studio B at Broadcasting House launched in June 2022 to include a whole new studio presentation, enhanced graphics and additional presentation locations within the studio. The upgrade brings the studio up to full HD capabilities for the first time.

== On air ==
On weekdays, six breakfast bulletins air as part of BBC Breakfast around every 30 minutes, between 6:26 am and 9:06 am. A fifteen-minute lunchtime bulletin airs at 1:30 pm, following the BBC News at One. The main edition of Midlands Today is broadcast every weeknight between 6.30 pm and 7.00 pm.The late night bulletin airs at 10.30 pm on weeknights, following the BBC News at Ten.

Midlands Today also airs short early evening bulletins on Saturday and Sunday evenings, although times usually vary. A late night bulletin is also broadcast on Sundays, following the BBC News at Ten.

== Presenters ==
=== News anchors ===
Person	Duties
Mary Rhodes	Mondays – Fridays main evening programme, alternating
Nick Owen	Mondays – Fridays main evening programme, alternating
Ben Godfrey	Correspondent and Presenter
Joanne Malin	Mondays BBC Breakfast / lunchtime, some late cover
Shefali Oza	Sundays

=== Weather presenters ===
Person	Other notes
Shefali Oza	Main weather presenter

== Past presenters ==
Former presenters have included Tom Coyne, Kay Alexander, Alan Towers, Alastair Yates, David Davies, Richard Uridge, Sue Beardsmore, Nina Nannar, Stuart Linnell, Matt Smith, Julian Worricker, Ashley Blake, Suzanne Virdee, Steve Clamp and Jackie Kabler. Olympic Gold medalist Denise Lewis also guest presented sport briefly during 2005, as did Rob Curling in 2002.

Senior presenter Alan Towers' on-air departure in July 1997 (after 25 years) brought about one of the most controversial moments in the programme's history when he shared indignant views on BBC management, describing them as "pygmies in grey suits wearing blindfolds".
