= David Condon (disambiguation) =

David or Dave Condon may refer to:

- David Condon, politician
- David Condon (field hockey)
- David Condon, other name of actor David Gorcey
- Dave Condon, musician in White Tomb and Altar of Plagues
- Dave Condon (writer) in Chicagoland Sports Hall of Fame
