= Barrie Edgar =

English television producer

Anthony Barrie Edgar (26 April 1919 – 28 December 2012) was an English television producer. Edgar began working for the BBC when its television service resumed after the Second World War, remaining with the corporation until his retirement in 1979. During the course of his career, he produced over 1,200 programmes, including multiple episodes of the long-running series Songs of Praise, Gardeners' World and Come Dancing.

== Early life ==
Barrie Edgar was born in Birmingham, the only child of Elsie Ann (née Wright) and Percy Edgar. His father was a music hall performer and concert organiser who established the BBC radio station 5IT. Barrie was educated at Oundle School and had an interest in acting from a young age. At the age of 14, he played Tom Brown in a Children's Hour radio production of Tom Brown's Schooldays, which starred Frank Benson as Dr Arnold.

After leaving school, he worked as a voluntary assistant stage manager at the Alexandra Theatre in Birmingham. Although unpaid, he worked seven days a week — six days of performances, with a scenery changeover on Sundays. In 1937 he became a stage manager for the Birmingham Repertory Theatre. This job was offered to him by the theatre's managing director Barry Jackson. While at the theatre, he also had acting experience as an extra. He also had broadcasting experience in 1938 when a group from the theatre, with Edgar as assistant stage manager, performed at Alexandra Palace in London for a live television broadcast of a drama by Adelaide Phillpotts.

Soon afterwards, Edgar applied for a job at BBC Television, but his application was unsuccessful due to the suspension of television broadcasts during the Second World War. During the War, Edgar served in the Fleet Air Arm, initially in the Middle East. During the Normandy landings in June 1944, he was temporarily transferred to the Air Sea Rescue section of the Royal Air Force. After this invasion, Edgar returned to the Fleet Air Arm and served in the Far East for the remainder of the war. By the time he had completed his naval service in 1946, he had risen to the rank of Lieutenant-Commander.

== Career ==
Edgar began his career with BBC Television in June 1946, having re-applied after completing his military service. He was the studio manager on 7 June for the first television broadcast after the BBC's wartime closure. He was one of six studio managers at Alexandra Palace at the time, and he continued in this role for three years, being involved in a variety of different broadcasts. His involvement in the coverage of the 1948 Summer Olympics in London led to an unexpected assignment as a commentator at the Empire Pool venue. He became a producer in 1949.

In 1951, he became the head of outside broadcasting at the BBC in Birmingham, overseeing one of the BBC's two outside broadcasting units. Previously, outside broadcasts had been confined to London; Edgar produced the first from Birmingham, an amateur boxing match at the Delicia Stadium. When ITV launched in 1955, they attempted to persuade several producers to move to the new network; Edgar turned down their offers and remained at the BBC.

Edgar's work remained diverse, covering national sporting events, the Miss World pageant, the general election in 1951, the funeral of Winston Churchill in 1965, and the first television broadcast from a submarine. In 1953, he produced the series Garrison Theatre, which featured broadcasts of variety shows at different RAF bases. This series featured the television debut of Bob Monkhouse. Two of his favourite projects from this time were a series of programmes documenting the rebuilding of Coventry Cathedral between 1956 and 1962, after its wartime damage, and the annual carol service from King's College, Cambridge, which he produced between 1962 and 1968. A process of specialisation during the 1960s and 1970s meant that Edgar could not continue working across such a broad range of programming, with some of these areas such as sport and current affairs being given instead to other departments.

Edgar also worked on a number of long-running BBC series, beginning with Come Dancing, a ballroom dancing competition show that he joined in 1953. He worked with several presenters, including Peter West and Terry Wogan, producing in total 164 episodes of this series. In his autobiography Is It Me?, Wogan described him as "one of the best and nicest people with whom I have ever worked". He also produced 225 episodes of Gardeners' World between 1972 and 1979, and 76 episodes of Songs of Praise. In later life, he expressed his pleasure at the continuation of these series, although he was not entirely fond of Strictly Come Dancing, the revived version of Come Dancing.

Edgar retired from the BBC in 1979, when he reached the retirement age of 60. During his 33-year career at the corporation, he had produced over 1,200 programmes.

== Personal life ==
Edgar married Joan Burman, an actress and radio continuity announcer, in 1943. The couple had first met when Burman performed as an acting student at the Birmingham Repertory Theatre in the late 1930s. Joan died in 2005. After her death, he moved into a Sunrise Senior Living retirement home in Edgbaston, where he remained until his death in 2012.

The couple had three children, who survived Edgar. Their son David Edgar became a successful playwright. He had been encouraged in this pursuit by his father, starting to write plays at the age of five when his father constructed a small wooden theatre for him. Edgar's daughter Kate also entered the theatre, as a composer and musical director. Sarah worked as an environmentalist.

Edgar's interests included carpentry, gardening and photography. In his retirement he sold hand-made picture frames to support Arthritis Research UK and managed the demonstration garden at the Pebble Mill Studios. He also volunteered for Lench's Trust, a local charity supporting elderly people. For many years, he was a member of The Magic Circle.

Barrie Edgar died on 28 December 2012, aged 93. He had been suffering from pneumonia prior to his death. A service of thanksgiving was held at St George's Church in Edgbaston in January 2013. At the time of his death, he had six grandchildren and three great-grandchildren; all three of his children survived him.
