= What's Between =

Studio album by Wife
- Released: 9 June 2014
- Genre: Electronic
- Length: 37:42
- Label: Tri Angle
- Producer: Wife; The Haxan Cloak; Lie; Roly Porter

Wife chronology
| Stoic (2012) | What's Between (2014) | Standard Nature (2016) |

What's Between is the debut studio album by Irish singer-songwriter James Kelly under the pseudonym Wife. It was released on 9 June 2014 through Tri Angle. It received generally favorable reviews from critics.

== Background ==
In 2012, James Kelly released his debut solo EP, titled Stoic, under the pseudonym Wife. The breakup of his band Altar of Plagues was announced in 2013. What's Between is his debut solo studio album. In the lead-up to the album's recording sessions, he took singing lessons. The album is produced with the Haxan Cloak, Lie, and Roly Porter. The album's title refers to "the emotional and physical space between two people." A music video was released for "Heart Is a Far Light". The album was released on 9 June 2014 through Tri Angle.

In a 2016 interview, Kelly recalled, "as things developed, the label and I had some disagreements [with] how we wanted it to come out." He added, "It was a shame that what I ended up with was a record I truly knew in my heart I was not happy with."

== Critical reception ==
Professional ratings
Aggregate scores
| Source | Rating |
|---|---|
| Metacritic | 74/100 |
Review scores
| Source | Rating |
| AllMusic | 3.5/5 stars |
| Exclaim! | 8/10 |
| Fact | 4/5 stars |
| NME | 8/10 |
| Pitchfork | 6.0/10 |
| Resident Advisor | 3.5/5 |
| The Skinny | 4/5 stars |

According to the review aggregator Metacritic, What's Between received "generally favorable reviews" based on a weighted average score of 74 out of 100 from 7 critic scores.

Bram E. Gieben of The Skinny commented that "there is a majestic sweep, a widescreen, cinematic ambition to James Kelly's songwriting that reaches for the melodramatic narrative touch of early Nine Inch Nails, or the abstract torch songs of Japan." He added, "Kelly is drawing on ancient choral traditions, deconstructed forms of electronic music spanning decades, but the songs are never difficult or over-cooked." Paul Clarke of Resident Advisor stated, "what's most surprising about What's Between is that a man mired in both metal and experimental electronic music has created melodies and choruses you could almost sing along to." Heather Phares of AllMusic called What's Between "a complex, often beautiful debut album that affords Kelly even more expression and possibilities than what he's done before." Colin Joyce of Pitchfork stated, "What's Between provides some compelling glimpses at Kelly's cimmerian headspace, but knowing that he possesses the ability and the vision to flesh out his own ideas, it's hard not to be left wanting more."

== Track listing ==
All tracks are written by James Kelly.

What's Between track listing
| No. | Title | Length |
|---|---|---|
| 1. | "Like Chrome" | 2:23 |
| 2. | "Tongue" | 5:24 |
| 3. | "Heart Is a Far Light" | 4:58 |
| 4. | "Salvage" | 2:46 |
| 5. | "Dans Ce" | 7:23 |
| 6. | "A Nature (Shards)" | 3:30 |
| 7. | "Living Joy" | 3:27 |
| 8. | "Fruit Tree" | 4:05 |
| 9. | "Further Not Better" | 3:46 |
| Total length: | | 37:42 |

== Personnel ==
Credits adapted from liner notes.

- Wife – vocals, production, mixing
- The Haxan Cloak – production, mixing
- Ana Roman – vocals (1)
- Lie – production (1–5, 7–9)
- Nahtan Jones – vocals (2, 6, 8)
- Roly Porter – additional production (5, 8, 9)
- Matt Lord – additional mixing
- Matt Colton – mastering
- Dr.Me – design
- Maykel Lima – photography
