= Welcome to Lagos =

Welcome to Lagos may refer to:

- Welcome to Lagos (statue), an Art Deco statue in Lagos, Nigeria
- Welcome to Lagos (TV series), a British mini-series
- Welcome to Lagos (novel), a 2016 novel by Chibundu Onuzo
