= Iyiola =

Given name

- Language: Yoruba

Origin
- Origin: Nigerian
- Meaning: Prestige of wealth
- Region of origin: South-West Nigeria

Iyìọlá is a Nigerian given name of Yoruba origin which means "The prestige of wealth". It originated from Southwest Nigeria.

The diminutive version includes "Iyi" "Ọla".

== Notable people bearing the name ==
- Iyiola Omisore, Nigerian politician
- Joan Iyiola, British-Nigerian actress
- Iyiola Solanke, Nigerian lawyer
