= Teethed Glory and Injury =

Studio album by Altar of Plagues
- Released: April 30, 2013
- Recorded: Orgone Studios
- Genres: Post-metal; black metal
- Length: 49:13
- Label: Candlelight
- Producer: James Kelly

Altar of Plagues chronology
Year of No Light / Altar of Plagues (2012)	Teethed Glory and Injury (2013)

Professional ratings
Review scores
Source	Rating
Pitchfork Media	6.8/10
Louder Sound	4.5/5 stars

Teethed Glory and Injury is the third and final studio album by the Irish black metal band Altar of Plagues, mixed by Jaime Gómez Arellano, who previously worked with Ghost B.C. and Ulver. It was released on April 30, 2013 through Candlelight Records and Profound Lore Records. Prior to the album's release, a music video was released for the track "God Alone", whence the album cover is derived.

== Track listing ==
All tracks are written by James Kelly.

No.	Title	Length
1.	"Mills"	4:08
2.	"God Alone"	4:30
3.	"A Body Shrouded"	4:59
4.	"Burnt Year"	4:49
5.	"A Remedy and a Fever"	8:59
6.	"Twelve Was Ruin"	4:47
7.	"Scald Scar of Water"	7:07
8.	"Found, Oval and Final"	3:26
9.	"Reflection Pulse Remains"	6:28
Total length:		49:13

== Personnel ==
Altar of Plagues

- James Kelly – vocals, guitars, keyboards, mixing, production
- Dave Condon – vocals, bass, design, layout
- Johnny King – drums

Additional personnel

- Jaime Gomez Arellano – mixing, mastering
- Barbora Mrazkova – photography
