= Percy Edgar =

English broadcaster (1884–1972)

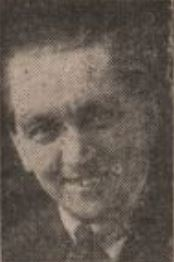
Percy Edgar, director of Birmingham station

Frederick Percy Edgar OBE (3 March 1884 – 21 April 1972) was an English broadcaster.

Edgar was the dominant figure in English regional broadcasting from its birth until World War II. In 1922 he was the founding General Manager and opening announcer for the first BBC station outside London - Birmingham's 5IT. Under Edgar 5IT pioneered many innovations, from employing the first full-time announcers to launching Children's Hour. He was the Director of the Midland Region – the first of the BBC Regions – from its foundation in 1927 and the BBC's senior Regional Director until his retirement in 1948.

== Life ==
Edgar was born and educated in Stafford, spending his early career on the concert platform. During World War I he organised series of concerts in military camps and hospitals, a role he combined after the war with touring theatres and music halls, where his speciality was presenting characters from Dickens. Frustration with constant touring and rowdy audiences led him to accept a post as director of a concert agency in New Street, Birmingham in 1921, and it was in this capacity that he was approached in October 1922 by the Western Electric Company, firstly to supply artists to perform on the radio station they were planning to open in Birmingham and, shortly afterwards, to manage the station itself.

He later recalled:

Everyone whom I consulted advised me to turn it down. This broadcasting would be a passing craze. However, I had a strong conviction that for me this was the opportunity which knocks just once at a man's door, and I decided to accept.

Despite being asked on one occasion "But tell me, Mr Edgar, what do you do in the daytime?", the early days of 5IT would often see Edgar working fifteen-hour days – planning the nightly programme, booking the performers and arranging their transport to the station's studio in Witton, reading the news, announcing the running order and working the gramophone. By late November, however, 5IT had been taken over by the newly established British Broadcasting Company and Edgar had recruited a staff of five, including an assistant manager, an announcer and two engineers.

1927 saw 5IT closed as the opening of the high-powered Borough Hill transmitter enabled the creation of the Midland Region transmitting the BBC Regional Programme. Edgar was the region's founding Director and fought for the role of regional programme-making within the BBC, writing to Director-General John Reith in 1929 that "the ever growing policy of centralisation in London has clearly gone a good deal further and more rapidly than public opinion here is prepared to accept" and running the Midland Region as a "kind of independent entrepreneur". By 1935 the Midlands Region was producing 40% of its broadcast output itself – more than any other region – and with 14 producers was largest BBC department outside London.

Percy Edgar's son Barrie Edgar also worked for the BBC as a television producer, and his grandson is the playwright David Edgar.

== Bibliography ==
- Briggs, Asa (2000) [1961], The Birth of Broadcasting, The History of Broadcasting in the United Kingdom, vol. I, London: Oxford University Press, ISBN 0-19-212926-0
- Briggs, Asa (2000) [1965], The Golden Age of Wireless, The History of Broadcasting in the United Kingdom, vol. II, London: Oxford University Press, ISBN 0-19-212930-9
- Briggs, Asa (2000) [1978], Sound and Vision, The History of Broadcasting in the United Kingdom, vol. IV, London: Oxford University Press, ISBN 0-19-212967-8
- Edgar, David (7 July 2005), "What are we telling the nation?", London Review of Books, London: LRB (London)
- Hennessy, Brian; Hennessy, John (2005), The emergence of broadcasting in Britain, Southerleigh, ISBN 0-9551408-0-3
- "EDGAR, Frederick Percy", Who Was Who (Online ed.), Oxford University Press, 2007
