= Pentecost (play) =

Play by David Edgar

Pentecost is a 1994 play by the British playwright David Edgar. It is named after the Christian festival of Pentecost. It is set during the early 1990s and concerns the discovery of a mural in a small church. It is part of a trilogy of plays on the theme of negotiation set in Eastern Europe in the aftermath of the fall of the Berlin Wall: the other two plays are The Shape of the Table (1990) and The Prisoner's Dilemma (2001).

The play was premiered on 12 October 1994 at the Other Place by the Royal Shakespeare Company, in a production directed by Michael Attenborough. This production transferred to the Young Vic on 31 May 1995, where it won that year's Evening Standard Award for Best Play. It has been revived in London in 2012 and 2014, New York in 2014 and at Stratford, Ontario in 2007.
