= Dolapo Is Fine =

2020 short film by Ethosheia Hylton

- Film Poster
- Directed by: Ethosheia Hylton
- Screenplay by: Joan Iyiola; Chibundu Onuzo
- Produced by: Millie Marsh
- Starring: Doyin Ajiboye; Katie Friedli Walton; Joan Iyiola; Gina McKee; Pamela Nomvete; Joseph Mydell; Luke Gasper; Thamilvani Umaipalan
- Cinematography: Yinka Edward
- Edited by: Xanna Ward-Dixon
- Music by: Chibundu Onuzo
- Distributed by: Salaud Morisset
- Release date: August 2020 (American Black Film Festival)
- Country: United Kingdom
- Language: English

Dọlápọ̀ Is Fine is a live action short film directed by Ethosheia Hylton and written by Joan Iyiola and Chibundu Onuzo in 2020.

In 2020, it won the HBO Short Film Competition at American Black Film Festival.

This short film was co-produced by Joan Iyiola, Joe Bell and Chibundu Onuzo, and executive produced by Amy Dowd and Elisabeth Hopper. Dọlápọ̀ Is Fine is distributed worldwide by the International Production & Distribution company Salaud Morisset.

== Plot ==
Ready to leave her UK boarding school and enter the working world, a young Black woman faces pressure to change her name and natural hairstyle.

== Awards ==
Since its launch, the film has been selected in many festivals around the world.

Year	Festival	Award/Category	Status
2020	African Diaspora International Film Festival	Best Short Film	Nominated
2020	American Black Film Festival	HBO Short Film Award	Won
2020	I Will Tell International Film Festival	Best Short Drama	Won
2020	I Will Tell International Film Festival	Best Actress in a Short Drama	Won
2020	LA Shorts Fest	Best Short Film	Nominated
2020	Leeds International Film Festival	Best British Short	Nominated
2020	BFI London Film Festival	Best Short Film	Nominated

== Cast & Crew ==
Cast

- Dọlápọ̀: Doyin Ajiboye
- Imogen: Katie Friedli Walton
- Daisy: Joan Iyiola
- Michelle Adams: Gina McKee
- Mum: Pamela Nomvete
- Dad: Joseph Mydell
- Mr. Wilson: Luke Gasper
- Sunita: Thamilvani Umaipalan

Crew

- Director: Ethosheia Hylton
- Writer: Joan Iyiola & Chibundu Onuzo
- Producer: Millie Marsh
- Production Company: Apatan Productions
- Co-Producer: Joe Bell, Joan Iyiola, Chibundu Onuzo
- Executive Producers: Amy Dowd, Elisabeth Hopper
- Line Producer: Nicholas Jessup
- Production Manager: Isobel Pietsch
- Cinematographer: Yinka Edward
- Editor: Xanna Ward-Dixon
- Sound Design: Richard Chesebrough
- Composer: Chibundu Onuzo
- Production Sound Mixer: Alex Langner
- Production Design: Elaine Xu
- Casting Director: Savannah Power
