= Joan Edgar =

British radio announcer

Daily Express, 1944

Joan Edgar (born Joan Burman, died 2005) was a World War II-era BBC Radio continuity announcer, and an actress.

She appeared as a castaway on the BBC Radio programme Desert Island Discs on 1 September 1945.

She married the television producer Barrie Edgar in 1943. The couple had first met when she performed as an acting student at the Birmingham Repertory Theatre in the late 1930s. They lived in the Edgbaston district of Birmingham in retirement. Their son David Edgar became a successful playwright. He had been encouraged in this pursuit by his father, starting to write plays at the age of five when his father constructed a small wooden theatre for him. Their daughter Kate also entered the theatre, as a composer and musical director. Their other daughter, Sarah worked as an environmentalist. Barrie survived Joan.
