= The Shape of the Table =

Play by David Edgar

- Original language: English
- Written by: David Edgar

Premiere
- Date: 8 November 1990
- Place: National Theatre, London, UK

The Shape of the Table is a theatrical drama written by David Edgar. It was first staged at the National Theatre, London, UK on 8 November 1990 - the first anniversary of the fall of the Berlin Wall - in a production directed by Jenny Killick.

== Overview ==
The Shape of the Table is a powerful depiction of a fictional Eastern European nation's transitional journey from stoic Communist leadership to a more Western style democracy. The timing of the original staging to coincide with the first anniversary of the fall of Berlin Wall, and thus the Communist regime, marked the first in a trilogy of dramas Edgar had written on the theme of negotiation in the region. Other plays include Pentecost and The Prisoner's Dilemma. The trilogy was revived by North Carolina’s Burning Coal theatre company in 2014.

The title of the play refers to a controversial incident surrounding negotiations held during the Vietnam War. Diplomats from the US, Saigon and Communist leaders took much time deciding the seating positions of delegates before discussions could even begin.
