= Written on the Heart =

Play by David Edgar

Written on the Heart is a 2011 play by the British playwright David Edgar. It was premiered by the Royal Shakespeare Company at the Swan Theatre from 27 October 2011 to 10 March 2012, to mark the four-hundredth anniversary of the King James Bible – it draws its title from the translation of Jeremiah 31.33 in that translation and deals with William Tyndale's and Lancelot Andrewes's involvement in biblical translation.

It opened for a London run at the Duchess Theatre on 19 April – originally scheduled to run until 21 July 2012, it closed early on 19 May.

== Original cast and creative ==
Role	Premiere Cast, 27 October 2011
George Abbot, Bishop of London	Bruce Alexander
Young Lancelot Andrewes	Jamie Ballard
William Tyndale	Stephen Boxer
Richard Thompson / William Laud	Paul Chahidi
Nun	Laura Darrall
Lancelot Andrewes	Oliver Ford Davies
Laurence Chaderton / Archdeacon	James Hayes
John Overall	Jim Hooper
Painter	Youssef Kerkour
Samuel Ward	Joseph Kloska
Henry, Prince of Wales	Sam Marks
Squire's Wife / Lady Alletta Carey	Annette McLaughlin
Mary Culler	Jodie McNee
Churchwarden	Ian Midlane
Young Catholic Priest / Harington	Mark Quartley
Clerk	Daniel Stewart
Sir Henry Saville	Simon Thorp
Creative
Gregory Doran	Director
Francis O'Connor	Designer
Tim Mitchell	Lighting
Paul Englishby	Music
Jonathan Ruddick	Sound
Original Musicians
Soprano 1	Alexandra Saunders
Soprano 2	Anna Bolton
Tenor 1	Matthew Spillett
Tenor 2	Mitesh Khatri
Bass	Lewis Jones
