= The Surgeon (film) =

2026 thriller film

- Directed by: Roshan Sethi
- Written by: Roshan Sethi
- Produced by: Basil Iwanyk; Erica Lee; Diarmaid McGrath; Tim Headington; Lia Buman; Neil Shah; Steve Klinsky; Adam Kolbrenner; John Schoenfelder; Russell Ackerman
- Starring: Michelle Yeoh; Martin Freeman; Laurie Davidson; Yuri Kolokolnikov; Joseph Mydell
- Cinematography: Nikolaus Summerer
- Edited by: Sabrina Pitre
- Music by: James Ó Ceallaigh
- Production companies: Thunder Road Films; Tango Entertainment; Untravelled Worlds; Wild Atlantic Pictures; Neotext; Lit Entertainment
- Distributed by: Sony Pictures Releasing (United States); Sky Cinema (Ireland)
- Release dates: September 12, 2026 (TIFF); April 2, 2027 (United States and Ireland)
- Running time: 92 minutes
- Countries: United States; Ireland
- Language: English

The Surgeon is a 2026 thriller film written and directed by Roshan Sethi. It stars Michelle Yeoh, Martin Freeman, Laurie Davidson, Yuri Kolokolnikov and Joseph Mydell.

It was premiered in the Centrepiece section of the 2026 Toronto International Film Festival on September 12, 2026, and it is scheduled to be released in the United States on April 2, 2027.

== Premise ==
A retired doctor is forced to perform one last operation.

== Cast ==
- Michelle Yeoh
- Martin Freeman
- Laurie Davidson
- Yuri Kolokolnikov
- Joseph Mydell

Roshan Sethi, Director, World Premiere of The Surgeon, TIFF 2026

Michelle Yeoh, World Premiere of The Surgeon, TIFF 2026

== Production ==
In May 2025, it was announced Michelle Yeoh had joined the cast of the film, with Roshan Sethi directing from a screenplay he wrote.

== Release ==
It was premiered in the Centrepiece section of the 2026 Toronto International Film Festival on September 12, 2026. Later that month, Sony Pictures acquired distribution rights to the film in North and Latin America, Italy, China and Hong Kong. The film is scheduled to be released in the United States on April 2, 2027.
