= Joseph Mydell =

American actor (born 1955)

- Born: 1955 (age 70–71); Savannah, Georgia, U.S.
- Occupation: Actor

Joseph Mydell (born 1955) is an American screen and stage actor.

== Early life ==
Mydell was born in Savannah, Georgia. He attended West Savannah elementary school, Tompkins High School (class of 1963), and Morehouse College (1964–65), where he met Martin Luther King when King spoke at his alma mater after receiving the Nobel Prize for Peace. Inspired by King, and the call of Baháʼís, Mydell participated in the (probably third) Selma to Montgomery marches in 1965.

He continued his education at the New York University, School of the Arts (B.F.A., 1970; M.F.A., 1974) City University of New York (CUNY Ph. D Theatre studies, 1976–1979).

== Career ==
Mydell trained as an actor, working with Dr. Baldwin Burroughs and the Atlanta Morehouse Spelman Players in Shakespeare”s The Tempest, and Trials of Brother Jero by Wole Soyinka. In 1969 he co-performed a play, Who is America, at the US Baháʼí national convention, the first "Youth for the World" conference in Nashville, Tennessee, then at another one in Dayton, Ohio that summer, and later in November at the University Park campus of the Pennsylvania State University. At NYU, he was trained by Lloyd Richards, Olympia Dukakis and Kristin Linklater, and directed by Andre Gregory. His professional career began in New York with the New York Shakespeare Festival and Lincoln Center theatre. He got his Equity card understudying Clevon Little off- Broadway. He also worked at Seattle Repertory theatre and for the National Endowment for the Arts in their touring production of "For All Times".

He traveled to England in 1979 to research his one-man show on Paul Laurence Dunbar, "Lyrics of the Hearthside", which he developed while studying for a Ph.D in theatre.

In 1980 he won a Fringe First and Best One-Man Show award at the Edinburgh Festival. The United States Information Service sponsored an African tour of his show. He later began work with Royal Shakespeare Company, and has continued his association with them for over 30 years. He has also worked extensively at The Royal National theatre.

== Filmography ==
=== Film ===
Key
†	Denotes productions that have not yet been released

Year	Title	Role	Notes
1988	Beryl Markham: A Shadow on the Sun	Kibii	TV film
1989	Agatha Christie's Miss Marple: A Caribbean Mystery	Inspector Weston	TV film
1990	The March	Marcus Brown	
1990	The Care of Time	Lampeter	TV film
1995	Sidney's Chair	Sidney Poitier	Short film
2005	Born with Two Mothers	Lindon	TV film
2005	Manderlay	Mark	
2009	Perfect	Jacques	Short
2011	You Instead	The Prophet	
2012	National Theatre Live: The Comedy of Errors	Aegeon	
2012	Julius Caesar	Casca	TV film
2013	Columbite Tantalite	Old Sese	Short film
2015	Woman in Gold	Judge Clarence	
2016	Richard III	Lord Stanley	
2017	Royal Shakespeare Company: The Tempest	Gonzalo	
2019	National Theatre Live: The Tragedy of King Richard the Second	John of Gaunt	
2020	Dolapo Is Fine	Dad	Short film
2022	The Eternal Daughter	Bill	
2023	The Unlikely Pilgrimage of Harold Fry	Rex	
2026	The Surgeon		

=== Television ===
Year	Title	Role	Notes
1985	American Playhouse	Johnson	Episode: "Displaced Person"
1988	CBS Summer Playhouse	Peter	Episode: "My Africa"
1989	Boon	Winston Hammond	Episode: "Banbury Blue"
1989	A Quiet Conspiracy	US Lieutenant	Mini-series
1989	Screen Two	Clyde	Episode: "Defrosting the Fridge"
1990	Bergerac	John Tetteh	Episode: "A True Detective"
1990	TECX	Joseph Akashte	Episode: "Needle in a Haystack"
1990	The Gravy Train	Duke	Mini-series
1991	Chancer	Cyril	Recurring role, 5 episodes
1993	Jeeves and Wooster	Coneybear	Recurring role, 3 episodes
1993	All or Nothing at All	Andrew	Mini-series
1994	Space Precinct	John Kane	Episodes: "Welcome to Demeter City" & "The Snake"
1994	The All New Alexei Sayle Show	Various roles	Episode: "Series 1, Episode 4"
1994	Scarlett	Jerome	Mini-series
1995	Space Precinct	Officer Lionel Carson	Series regular
2001	The Bill	Mr Ames	Episode: "Return of the Hunter"
2003	Dinotopia	Doctor	2 episodes
2005	Doctors	Vince Wood	Episode: "A Wolf at the Door"
2007	Trial & Retribution	Matt Turner	Episode: "Paradise Lost"
2010	Holby City	Robin Knight	Episode: "Dandelions"
2011	Death in Paradise	Hotel Manager	Episode: "Wicked Wedding Night"
2014	The Missing	Minister	Episode: "Till Death"
2014	Homeland	Billy	Episode: "Long Time Coming"
2016	Midsomer Murders	Dr Isaac Vernon	Episode: "Habeas Corpus"
2016	Shield 5	Yorke	Web-series, exclusive to Instagram
2018	Mrs Wilson	Bert	Mini-series
2023	The Castaways	Jack	Mini-series
2025	Prime Target	Professor Raymond Osborne	Series regular

=== Stage ===
Year	Title	Role	Venue	Notes
1985	The Price of Experience		Traverse Theatre, Edinburgh	
1986	Lyrics of the Hearthside	All roles	Swan Theatre, Stratford-upon-Avon & Royal National Theatre, London	One-man show, also USA, Germany and Denmark Tour
1986–1987	Macbeth	Bloody Sergant/Scottish Doctor	Royal Shakespeare Theatre – Stratford-upon-Avon, Tyne Theatre – Newcastle upon Tyne & Barbican Centre – London	with Royal Shakespeare Company
1986–1987	World's Apart	Borras	The Other Place – Stratford-upon-Avon, Gulbenkian Studio – Newcastle upon Tyne & Barbican Centre – London	with Royal Shakespeare Company
1986–1987	Flight	Albert Hamadziripi	The Other Place – Stratford-upon-Avon, Gulbenkian Studio – Newcastle upon Tyne & Barbican Centre – London	with Royal Shakespeare Company
1986–1987	The Two Noble Kinsmen	Bavian/The Executioner	Swan Theatre, Stratford-upon-Avon & People's Theatre, Newcastle upon Tyne	with Royal Shakespeare Company
1987	The Great White Hope	The Pastor	Mermaid Theatre, London	with Royal Shakespeare Company
1987	They Shoot Horses, Don't They?	Cal Holliday	Mermaid Theatre, London	with Royal Shakespeare Company
1990	The Boys Next Door	Lucien P. Smith	Hampstead Theatre, London & Comedy Theatre, London	
1991	As You Like It	Duke Frederick	Crucible Theatre, Sheffield	
1992–1994	Angels in America	Belize/Mr. Lies	Cottesloe Theatre, London	
1993	The Treatment		Royal Court Theatre, London	
1994–1995	Alice's Adventures Underground	Mad Hatter	Cottesloe Theatre, London	
1996–1998	Everyman	Everyman	The Other Place – Stratford-upon-Avon, Barbican Centre – London & Brooklyn Academy of Music – New York City	with Royal Shakespeare Company
1998	The Mysteries	Satan/Lazarus	Barbican Centre, London	with Royal Shakespeare Company
2000	As You Like It	Duke Frederick/Corin	Royal Exchange Theatre, Manchester	
2001–2002	Twelfth Night	Antonio	Royal Shakespeare Theatre – Stratford-upon-Avon, Theatre Royal – Newcastle upon Tyne & Barbican Centre – London	with Royal Shakespeare Company
2001–2002	The Prisoner's Dilemma	Patterson Davis	The Other Place, Stratford-upon-Avon & Barbican Centre, London	with Royal Shakespeare Company
2002	Medea	Aegeus	Brooklyn Academy of Music, New York City	also, US tour
2003	Edmond	Preacher	Olivier Theatre, London	
2004	Anna in the Tropics	Santiago	Hampstead Theatre, London	
2005–2006	Breakfast with Mugabe	Robert Mugabe	Soho Theatre, London & Duchess Theatre, London	with Royal Shakespeare Company
2006	The Winter's Tale	Camillo	Swan Theatre, Stratford-upon-Avon	with Royal Shakespeare Company
2006	Pericles	Gower	Swan Theatre, Stratford-upon-Avon	with Royal Shakespeare Company
2007	The Last Confession	Bernardin Gantin	Theatre Royal Haymarket, London & Chichester Festival Theatre, Chichester	
2008	King Lear	Earl of Gloucester	Shakespeare's Globe, London	
2008	The Resistible Rise of Arturo Ui	Dogsborough	Lyric Theatre, London	
2008	The Jew of Malta	Barabas	Hall for Cornwall, Truro	
2009	The Tempest	Prospero	Regent's Park Open Air Theatre, London	
2009	Cat on a Hot Tin Roof	Doctor Baugh	Novello Theatre, London	
2010	Elektra	Paedagogus	Young Vic, London	
2010	Hamlet	Player King	Crucible Theatre, Sheffield	
2011	The Comedy of Errors	Aegeon	Olivier Theatre, London	
2012	Julius Caesar	Casca	Royal Shakespeare Theatre, Stratford-upon-Avon	also, UK & USA tour
2013	A Thousand Miles of History	Gerard Basquiat	The Bussey Building, London	
2013	A Season in the Congo	Kala Lubu	Young Vic, London	
2014	The Crucible	Thomas Danforth	West Yorkshire Playhouse, Leeds	
2015	Evening at the Talkhouse	Bill	Dorfman Theatre, London	
2016	Richard III	Stanley	Almeida Theatre, London	
2017	The Tempest	Gonzalo	Barbican Centre, London	with Royal Shakespeare Company
2017	William Wordsworth	George Beaumont	Theatre by the Lake, Keswick	with English Touring Theatre
2017	Mother Christmas	Peter	Hampstead Theatre, London	
2018	Hamlet	Polonius	The Lowry – Salford, Theatre Royal – Plymouth, New Theatre – Kingston upon Hull, Northern Stage – Newcastle upon Tyne, Royal & Derngate – Northampton, Hackney Empire – London & Kennedy Center, Washington, D.C.	with Royal Shakespeare Company
2018	The Tragedy of King Richard the Second	John of Gaunt	Almeida Theatre, London	
2019	Death of a Salesman	Ben Loman	Young Vic, London & Piccadilly Theatre, London	
2020	The Visit	The Reverend	Olivier Theatre, London	
