= Mammal (album) =

- Profound Lore Records release cover, artwork by: Timo Ketola

Studio album by Altar of Plagues
- Released: April 25, 2011 (Europe); May 17, 2011 (North America)
- Recorded: September 2010, Data Recording Studios
- Genre: Atmospheric black metal, post-metal
- Length: 51:59
- Label: Candlelight; Profound Lore
- Producer: James Kelly

Altar of Plagues chronology
Tides (2010)	Mammal (2011)	Year of No Light / Altar of Plagues (2012)

Alternative cover
- Candlelight Records release cover, artwork by: Daniel Sesé

Professional ratings
Review scores
Source	Rating
About.com	4/5 stars
Allmusic	4.5/5 stars
Blistering	8/10
Chronicles of Chaos	9/10
The Digital Fix	8/10
Exclaim!	mixed and positive
PopMatters	8/10 stars
Thrash Hits	6/6
Angry Metal Guy	2.5/5

Mammal is the second studio album by the Irish black metal band Altar of Plagues. It was released through Candlelight Records in Europe and Profound Lore Records in North America, each with different artwork.

== Reception ==
The album received positive reviews from most critics. Brandon Stosuy of Pitchfork selected Mammal as 18th album of the top 40 metal albums of 2011.

== Track listing ==
All tracks are written by James Kelly.

No.	Title	Length
1.	"Neptune Is Dead"	18:44
2.	"Feather and Bone"	11:41
3.	"When the Sun Drowns in the Ocean"	8:17
4.	"All Life Converges to Some Centre"	13:15
Total length:		51:59

== Personnel ==
Altar of Plagues

- James Kelly – vocals, guitars, keyboards
- Dave Condon – vocals, bass
- Johnny King – drums

Technical personnel

- Timo Ketola – artwork (Profound Lore version)
- Daniel Sesé – artwork (Candlelight Records version)
- Ross O'Donovan – engineering
- Tadhg Healy – assistant engineer
- Tore Stjerna – mastering
- James Kelly – production
