= The Spider King's Daughter =

2012 novel by Chibundu Onuzo

- First edition
- Author: Chibundu Onuzo
- Language: English
- Genre: Literary Fiction, Romance
- Set in: Lagos, Nigeria
- Publisher: Faber and Faber
- Publication date: 1 March 2012
- Publication place: Nigeria
- Media type: Print (paperback)
- Pages: 304 pp (first edition)
- ISBN: 9780571268894 (first edition)
- OCLC: 814446865

The Spider King's Daughter is a 2012 novel written by Nigerian writer Chibundu Onuzo. It was first published on 1 March 2012, by Faber and Faber.

== Plot summary ==
The novel focuses on Abike Johnson and Runner G. Runner G, a college dropout, who hawks ice-creams on the streets of Lagos. Abike Johnson, who could be seen to be a spoiled child meets together. Their friendship grows as Abike learns to adjust to Runner G.

== Reception ==
The Spider King's Daughter won the 2013 Betty Trask Award. and in 2012 was shortlisted for the Dylan Thomas Prize and the Commonwealth Book Prize. In addition the novel was longlisted for the Desmond Elliott Prize and for the Etisalat Prize for Literature in 2013.
