= Ethosheia Hylton =

English screenwriter and film director

- Occupations: Screenwriter, film director

Ethosheia Hylton is an English screenwriter and film director. She is known for her work on In The Silence (short film) and Dọlápọ̀ Is Fine (short film) which won the HBO Short Film Competition at American Black Film Festival.

In 2018 Ethosheia was presented the inaugural European Academy Gold Fellowship For Women. The award, sponsored by Swarovski, offered a year-long mentorship scheme from the Academy. Driven by stories from untold voices and about community and culture, Ethosheia's work Brixton Rock, an adaptation of author Alex Wheatle's book of the same name, is being turned into a feature film. She is currently directing Ackley Bridge (TV Series on Channel 4).

== Filmography ==
Year	Title	Screenwriter	Director
2013	Small World (short)	Yes	Yes
2014	Cutting Edge (short)	No	Yes
2015	Lia (short)	Yes	Yes
2018	Brixton Rock (short)	Yes	Yes
2019	In The Silence	No	Yes
2020	Dolapo is Fine	No	Yes
