= Chibundu Onuzo =

Nigerian novelist (born 1991)

Chibundu Onuzo FRSL
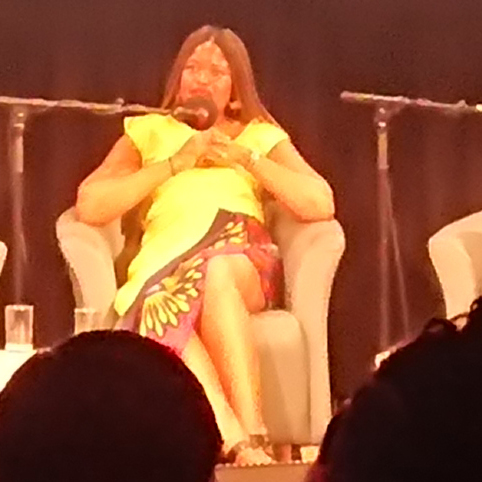
- Onuzo in 2019
- Born: Imachibundu Oluwadara Onuzo; 1991 (age 34–35); Lagos, Nigeria
- Notable work: The Spider King's Daughter (2012); Welcome to Lagos (2016)

Imachibundu Oluwadara Onuzo FRSL (born 1991) is a Nigerian novelist. Her first novel, The Spider King's Daughter, won a Betty Trask Award, was shortlisted for the Dylan Thomas Prize and the Commonwealth Book Prize, and was longlisted for the Desmond Elliott Prize and the Etisalat Prize for Literature.

== Biography ==
Chibundu Onuzo was born in 1991 in Nigeria, the youngest of four children of parents who are doctors, and grew up in Lagos. She moved to England when she was 14 to study at St Swithun's school in Winchester, Hampshire, for her GCSEs, and at the age of 17 began writing her first novel, which was signed two years later by Faber and Faber and was published when she was 21. She was the youngest female writer ever taken on by the publisher. Reviewing her second book, Welcome to Lagos (2016), Helon Habila wrote in The Guardian: "Onuzo's portrayal of human character is often too optimistic, her view of politics and society too charitable; but her ability to bring her characters to life, including the city of Lagos, perhaps the best-painted character of all, is impressive."

Onuzo received a first-class bachelor's degree in history from King's College London (2012), and went on to earn a master's degree in public policy from University College London. She studied for a PhD at King's College London, researching the West African Students' Union.

She has written for outlets including The Guardian and NPR, and contributed the short story "Sunita" to the 2019 anthology New Daughters of Africa, edited by Margaret Busby.

Onuzo's third novel Sankofa was published in the UK by Virago in June 2021, and was reviewed by The Guardian as "[a]n accomplished novel that explores difference and belonging with a cool intensity". Brittle Paper described it as "a love story, a political history, and a father-daughter drama". Sankofa was published by Catapult in the US and by Narrative Landscape in Nigeria.

== Bibliography ==
- The Spider King's Daughter (Faber and Faber, 2012)
- Welcome to Lagos (Catapult, 2016)
- Sankofa (Virago, 2021)
- Mayowa and the Sea of Words (Bloomsbury, 2024)
- Mayowa and the Speech of Fire (Bloomsbury, 2026)

== Awards and recognition ==
The Spider King's Daughter won a Betty Trask Award (2013), and in 2012 was shortlisted for the Dylan Thomas Prize and the Commonwealth Book Prize. In addition the novel was longlisted for the Desmond Elliott Prize and for the Etisalat Prize for Literature in 2013.

In April 2014 Onuzo was selected for the Hay Festival's Africa39 list of 39 Sub-Saharan African writers aged under 40 with potential and talent to define future trends in African literature.

In June 2018 Onuzo was elected a Fellow of the Royal Society of Literature in its "40 Under 40" initiative. Welcome to Lagos was shortlisted for the Encore Award.

At the 2020 American Black Film Festival, the HBO Short Film Competition was won by Dọlápọ̀ Is Fine, for which Onuzo co-wrote the screenplay and which was based on her short story "Sunita". The film, which was directed by Joan Iyiola, has also been longlisted for the Bafta British short film award.
