= Sankofa (novel) =

2021 novel by Chibundu Onuzo

- Author: Chibundu Onuzo
- Language: English
- Publication date: 2021

Sankofa is a 2021 social novel by Nigerian novelist Chibundu Onuzo. Sankofa is Onuzo's third novel. It was published in the UK by Virago in June 2021, and was reviewed by The Guardian as "[a]n accomplished novel that explores difference and belonging with a cool intensity", then published by Catapult in the US and Narrative Landscape in Nigeria.

An audiobook, read by British-Jamaican actress Sara Powell, was released in October 2021. As of 11/13/2023, the book has an average 3.86 on Goodreads.
