= The Prisoner's Dilemma (play) =

The Prisoner's Dilemma is a theatrical drama written by David Edgar. It refers to the game theory problem of the same name and portrays its outworking in an Eastern European, post-Cold War setting. The play premiered in The Other Place Theatre by the Royal Shakespeare Company in July 2001 and forms part of a trilogy with The Shape of the Table and Pentecost.

Cast for the premiere included: Trevor Cooper (as Nikolai/Kolya), Larry Lamb (as Tom), Joseph Mydell (as Patterson), Robert Jezek (as Hasim), Alan David (as Erik), Zoe Waites (as Kelima), Penny Downie (as Gina), Diana Kent (as Floss), David Wilmot (as James), Douglas Rao (as Al), Robert Bowman (as Roman) and was directed by Michael Attenborough, with design by Es Devlin
