= A Time to Keep =

Play by David Edgar and Stephanie Dale

A Time to Keep is a 2007 play written by David Edgar and Stephanie Dale.

It is the fifth play to be specifically written for community actors in Dorchester. The "community play" contains over 100 characters, from George III and his court to the criminal classes. The original production featured over 130 actors and was directed by Jon Oram with music by Tim Laycock.

== Plot ==
In the summer of 1804, a group of women decides to put on a play to entertain the troops and George III.

Set against the backdrop of the threatened Napoleonic invasion of 1804, A Time to Keep inhabits terrain somewhere between Jane Austen and Charles Dickens, with its ambitious middle classes, its garrison of eligible officers, and its impoverished low-life. Driving the plot is an unlikely but passionate romance between a well-born but feisty young woman and the youngest son of a family of notorious smugglers.

== Original cast ==
- King George III - Mike Roberts
- Queen Charlotte - Sue Theobald
- Princess Augusta - Emily Taylor
- Princess Mary - Tanya Harrison
- Princess Sophia - Izzie Hall
- Henrietta Stickland - Miranda Blazeby
- Caroline Waldegrave - Rose Swann
- Elizabeth Waldegrave - Daphne Payne
- General Charles Fitzroy - Anthony Thorpe
- General Garth - John Ramsden
- Ann Mason - Ann Jonathan
- Mary Stickland - Natalie Wakelin
- Betty Sanger - Jessica Holloway
- Edith Oldis - Angie Ramsden
- George Corbin - Roan Doyle
- Jane Harvey - Clare Daniel
- Martha Ayres - Sarah Peterkin
- Rebecca Brindle - Joy Wallis
- Sara Bly - Sue McGarel
- Susan Thorne - Sheila Johns
- Captain Count Kielmanregge - Joseph Parsons
- Major James Brine - Peter Rothman
- Captain Joseph Hagley - Lee Fowgies
- Lieutenant Frederick Baron Uslau - Ken McGregor
- Excise Man 1 - Kevin Morris
- Excise Man 2 - David Reeve
- Recruiting Sergeants - Darren Richards and Kevin Morris
- Issac Gulliver - Craig Besant

== Response ==
The play received four stars from the critic Elisabeth Mahoney of The Guardian. She described the play as "a spirit-lifting evening of playfully told local history".

== The future ==
A Time to Keep was adapted for twenty actors and staged at LAMDA in autumn 2009 and then tour to the Lake District later that year. It was directed by Penny Cherns with musical direction by Tim Laycock. It was performed by a group of second-year Drama students at Loughborough University.

The play is published by Nick Hern Books. and is available for licensing.
