= The Unquiet Dead =

159 – "The Unquiet Dead"
- Doctor Who episode
- The Gelth break through the rift. Such "ethereal swirl" effects caused the episode to overshoot its CGI quota.

Cast
- Doctor: Christopher Eccleston – Ninth Doctor
- Companion: Billie Piper – Rose Tyler
- Others: Alan David – Gabriel Sneed; Huw Rhys – Redpath; Jennifer Hill – Mrs Peace; Eve Myles – Gwyneth; Simon Callow – Charles Dickens; Wayne Cater – Stage Manager; Meic Povey – Driver; Zoe Thorne – The Gelth

Production
- Directed by: Euros Lyn
- Written by: Mark Gatiss
- Produced by: Phil Collinson
- Executive producers: Russell T Davies; Julie Gardner; Mal Young
- Music by: Murray Gold
- Production code: 1.3
- Series: Series 1
- Running time: 44 minutes
- First broadcast: 9 April 2005

Chronology
← Preceded by "The End of the World"	Followed by → "Aliens of London"

"The Unquiet Dead" is the third episode of the first series of the British science-fiction television programme Doctor Who, first broadcast on 9 April 2005 on BBC One. It was written by Mark Gatiss and directed by Euros Lyn.

In the episode, the alien time traveller the Ninth Doctor (Christopher Eccleston) and his companion Rose Tyler (Billie Piper) travel to Victorian Cardiff on Christmas Eve, 1869, where there have been sightings of strange gas-like creatures. The Doctor and Rose team up with Charles Dickens (Simon Callow) to investigate Mr Sneed (Alan David), a man who runs a funeral parlour where it seems that corpses have come to life. It is revealed that the gaseous Gelth (voiced by Zoe Thorne) have entered Cardiff through a rift and wish to survive by taking over the corpses.

"The Unquiet Dead" is the first episode of the revival to be set in the past, and was intended to show the series' range. The original brief and script included a focus on mediums and was grimmer in tone, but it evolved into a story about zombies and became more of a "romp". Callow, who had researched Dickens as well as portraying him on multiple occasions, accepted the guest starring role in "The Unquiet Dead" because he felt the historical figure was written accurately. The episode introduced the Cardiff Rift, and also features a guest appearance by actress Eve Myles; Myles would go on to play Gwen Cooper in the Doctor Who spin-off series Torchwood from 2006. As contemporary Cardiff, location of the Doctor Who production, did not have enough Victorian architecture, location work for the episode was filmed in Swansea and Monmouth in September 2004 and Penarth in September and October, though one location scene was shot in Cardiff in September. Studio work was recorded at the Unit Q2 warehouse in Newport in September and October.

Computer-generated imagery (CGI) was used as the main visual effect for the Gelth. "The Unquiet Dead" was seen by 8.86 million viewers in the United Kingdom on first broadcast. It attracted generally positive reception, although some reviewers criticised some plot points and lack of moral dilemma.

== Plot ==
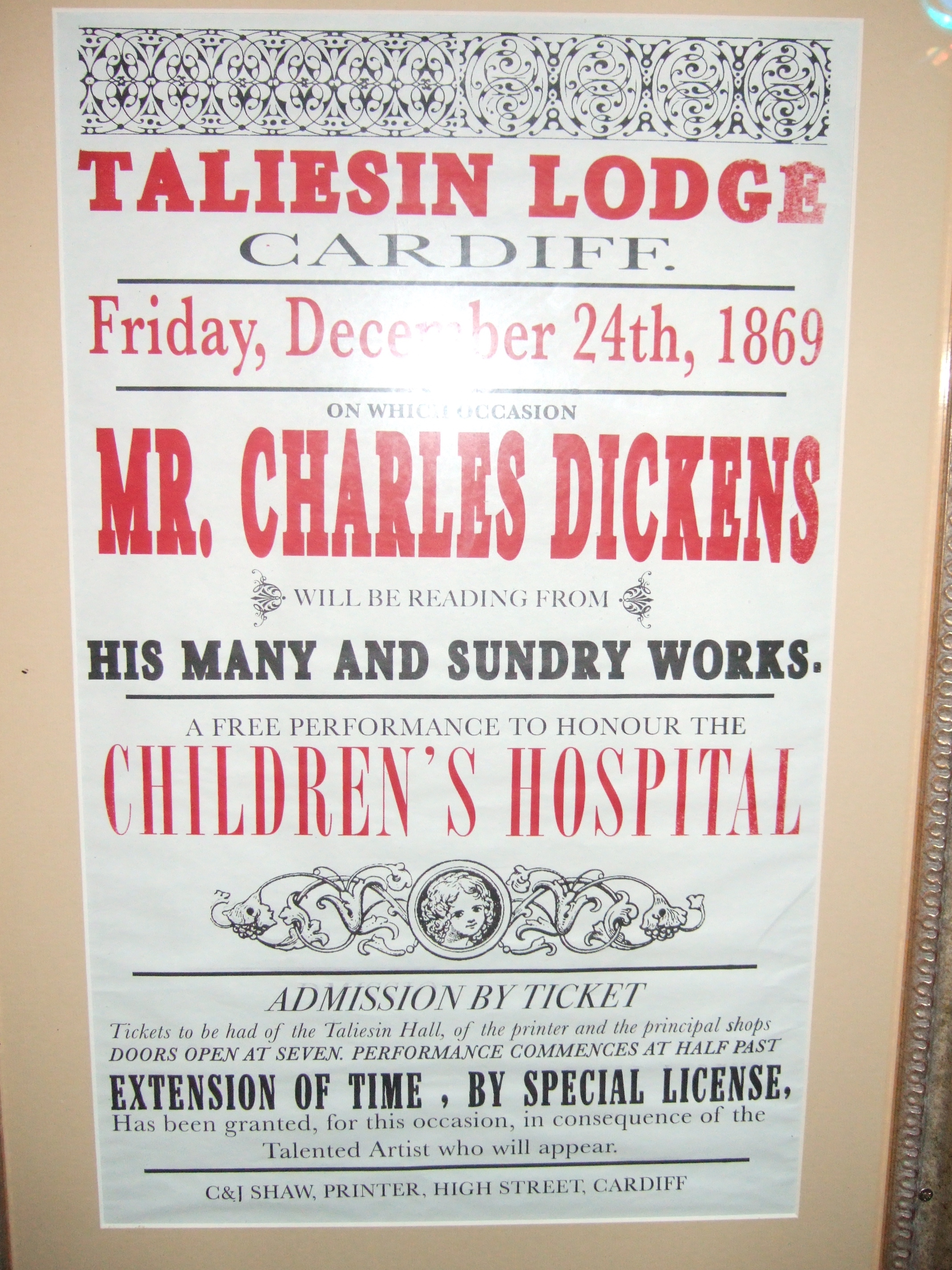
Poster from the episode on display at Doctor Who Exhibition.

The Ninth Doctor and Rose land in Cardiff on Christmas Eve, 1869. At a nearby funeral parlour, run by Gabriel Sneed and his servant Gwyneth, the corpse of the late Mrs Peace has been taken over by a blue vapour. She kills her grandson Mr. Redpath and escapes from the parlour. Gwyneth, a clairvoyant, senses that the corpse is going to see Charles Dickens at a nearby theatre. In the middle of Dickens' performance, the blue vapour leaves Mrs Peace and scares the audience away. The commotion attracts the attention of the Doctor and Rose, who rush to investigate. Sneed and Gwyneth arrive and capture the corpse, as well as Rose, who confronts them.

At the funeral parlour, Rose wakes up along with the newly-reanimated corpses of Mrs Peace and Mr Redpath. The Doctor and Dickens arrive and break into the parlour just in time to rescue Rose. The Doctor convinces Gwyneth to help him hold a séance to attempt to communicate with the corpses. The blue vapours fill the room and reveal that they are the Gelth, a once-corporeal alien race until they were devastated by the Time War. They plead with the Doctor to open the rift that exists in the morgue and allow "a few" Gelth to cross over. The Doctor offers the Gelth temporary use of the corpses until he can transport them to a place where they can build new bodies, using Gwyneth as a bridge to cross the rift.

Gwyneth stands in the middle of an arch and opens the rift, allowing the Gelth to cross over. The Gelth deceived how many of them there are, and their true motive is revealed: they intend to kill the living to give themselves more hosts and take over the planet. Sneed is killed and his body is possessed by the Gelth. Realising the Gelth are affected by the gas, Dickens extinguishes the gaslights and turns the gas on full, pulling the Gelth out of the bodies. Unable to send the Gelth back, Gwyneth takes out a box of matches, intending to ignite the gas and hold the Gelth in one spot with the explosion. The Doctor determines that Gwyneth is already dead, and that by opening the rift, she had doomed herself. The Doctor, Rose, and Dickens flee the parlour just before it explodes and burns, trapping the Gelth and closing the rift.

== Production ==
=== Writing ===
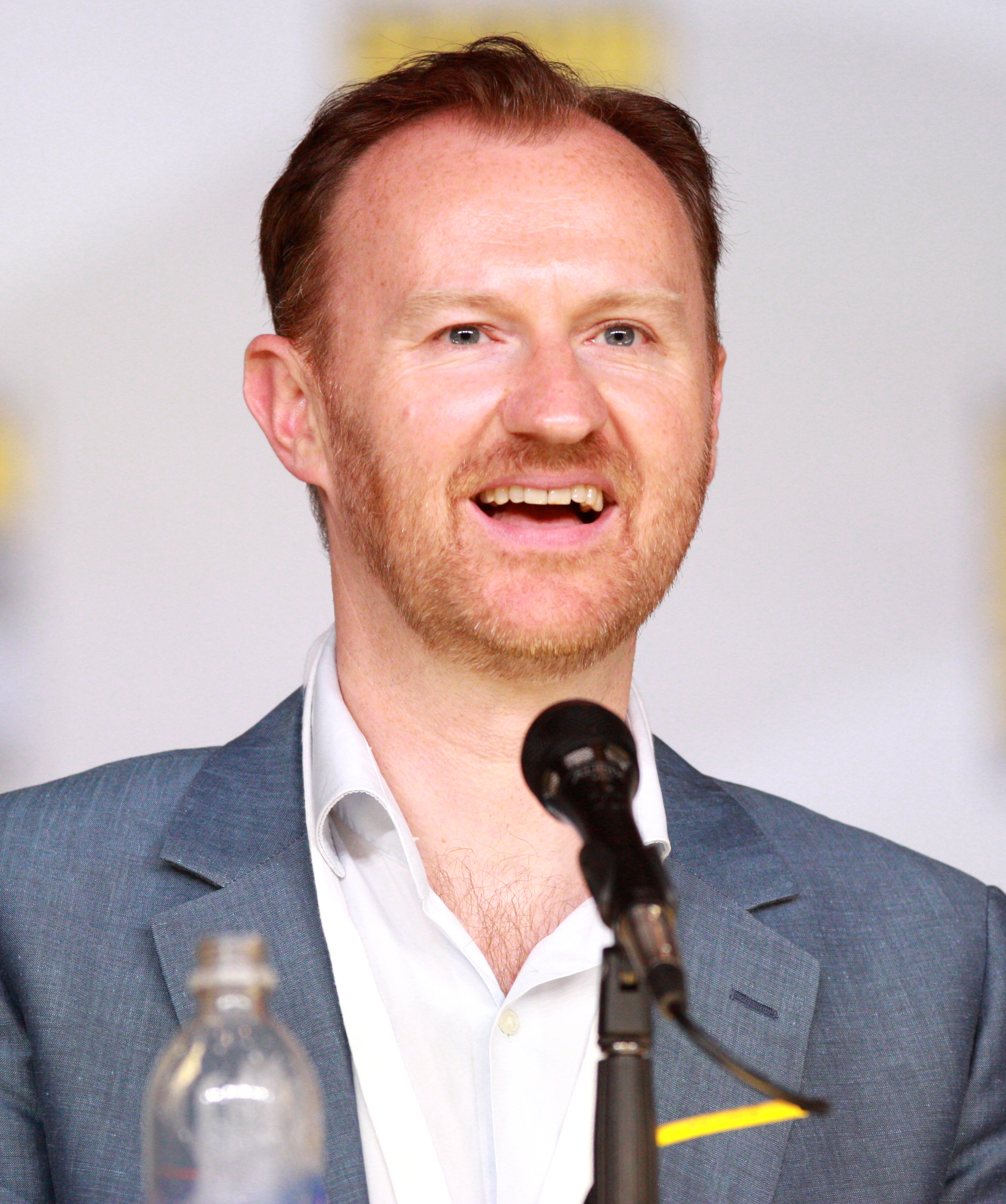
The episode's writer, Mark Gatiss (pictured), was a fan of Dickens's 1843 novella A Christmas Carol; this influenced the Christmas setting of the episode.

Executive producer and head writer Russell T Davies came up with the concept of "The Unquiet Dead". As the third episode of the revived series, it was designed to continue to show the range of the programme by exploring the past, after the contemporary "Rose" and far-future "The End of the World". The episode also reintroduces the TARDIS' habit of taking the Doctor to the wrong places, something that had not yet happened in the revived series. Davies felt that it was important for an episode to be set in Cardiff as that is where the new series is produced, and wanted the story to be set in Victorian times and feature Charles Dickens. Davies' original brief also included "fake mediums", and Gatiss originally set it in a "spiritualist hotel", which had fake mediums (such as a character named Mrs Plumchute) on the lower floors and Mr Sneed on the top, though he was unaware he was a true medium. However, Gwyneth became a more popular character with the production team, and she took on much of the medium role. Gatiss was also more interested in possession and zombies. Mrs Sneed was another character that was cut out of the episode; Gatiss believed she was unnecessary as Gwyneth was the "heart" of the story.

The working titles for this story included "The Crippingwell Horror" and "The Angels of Crippingwell". The original draft was grimmer, including details about the previous death of Gwyneth's younger brother, but in subsequent drafts the story became more of a "romp". Gatiss stated that the name "Gelth" simply popped into his head. Gatiss was encouraged to personify the Gelth, which he originally questioned because he felt that monsters whispering "Doctor" was a cliché; producer Phil Collinson remarked that perhaps it was a cliché because it worked well. The Rift was added into the plot to simplify the Gelth's origins.

Gatiss originally resisted having Dickens star in the episode, as traditionally the Doctor only mentioned meeting historical figures, but he eventually warmed to the idea. As A Christmas Carol fan, Gatiss wanted to set the episode at Christmas. He later realised that Dickens' journey in the episode mirrored that of Ebenezer Scrooge. In one scene, Gatiss wanted the knocker on a door behind Dickens to briefly show the Gelth's face in reference to A Christmas Carol, but this visual effect was not done. The episode originally began in the TARDIS, as Gatiss wanted the first glimpse of 1860 to be through Rose's eyes. While this changed, Gatiss still wanted to show how great travelling in time is. It was scripted that snow would blow into the TARDIS when the doors opened, but this was cut because of budget reasons. Davies requested a scene in which the Doctor takes Rose to the future to see a world filled with walking corpses — the result if they had left before defeating the Gelth — but this was too expensive to film. During the scene in which the Doctor and Dickens are talking in the coach, the driver was supposed to shout down to them (referencing a Dickens work) and the coach was to crash, but this was also too expensive.

=== Casting ===
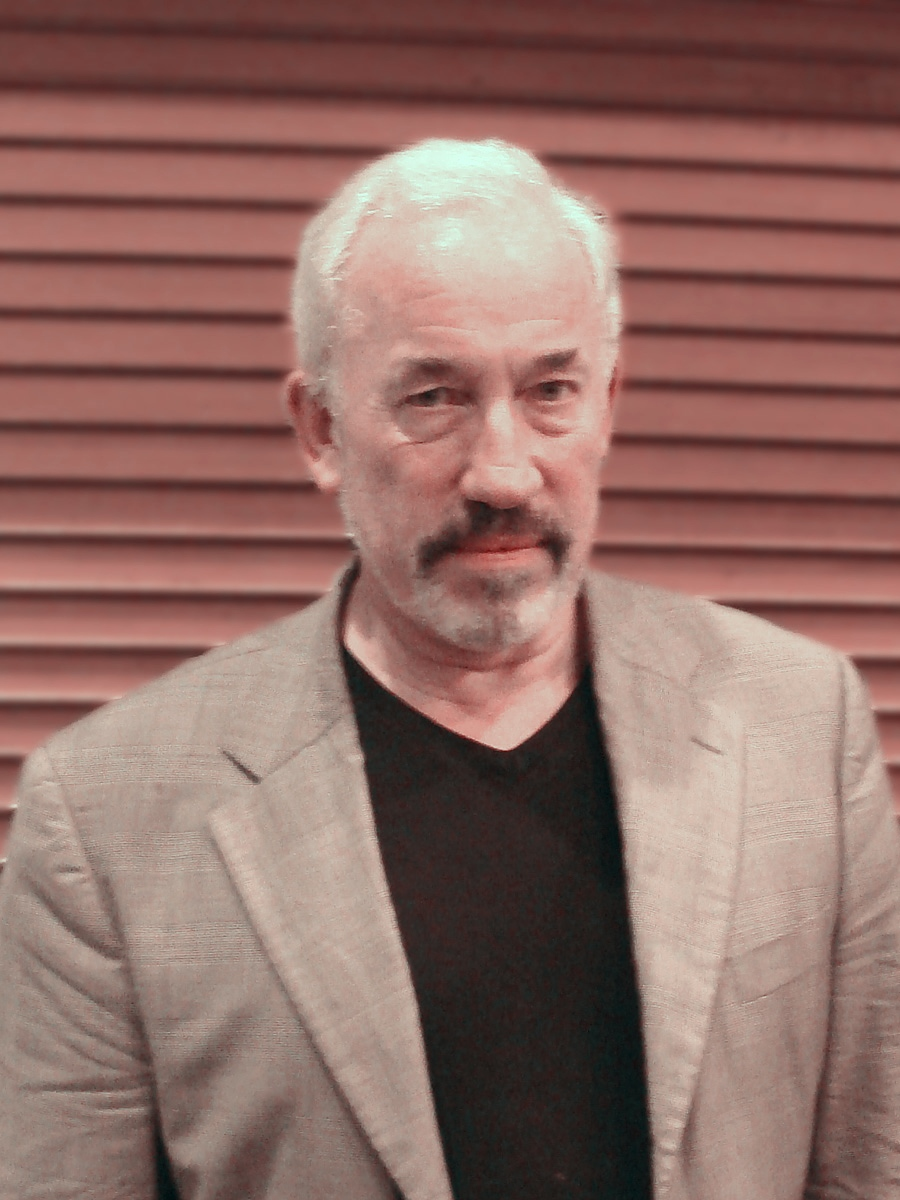
Actor and Charles Dickens expert Simon Callow connected with the episode as he felt that writer Mark Gatiss knew "exactly what Dickens is all about".

Simon Callow, who portrayed Dickens, was considered apt since he possessed extensive knowledge of the author and had experience playing the character and recreating his public readings. Callow contended that for him to agree to play Dickens, the script would have to be a sufficiently high quality. When he heard that the author was to feature in Doctor Who his heart "sank" as he felt fiction has a tendency to posit the author as "a kind of all-purpose Victorian literary character and really understand little, if anything, about him, his life or his books". Director Euros Lyn noted that the material being of interest to Callow was key to getting him involved. Promoting his role in Doctor Who, Callow stated that writer Mark Gatiss knew "exactly what Dickens is all about" and "very cleverly connects his idealism... with the Doctor's desire to save the world". Callow was also pleased that the episode portrayed Dickens as he was towards the end of his life: ill and sad rather than energetic. In the 2011 episode "The Wedding of River Song", Callow returned to reprise his role as Dickens briefly.

Eve Myles, who played Gwyneth, was initially not supposed to film the episode as she was booked for another role in theatre. However, her agent notified Myles of the role and Myles was keen to audition for the series due to its reputation and Eccleston being "one of my favourite actors of all time". After inadvertently attending the audition in a T-shirt emblazoned with an image of two naked women kissing under the slogan "I support Nudist Colonies", Myles was convinced she had not got the part; her appearance contrasted grossly with Gwyneth's personality. After being notified of her success Myles did not want to prioritise between her theatre commitments and Doctor Who; her agent decided that she would appear in the episode. Russell T Davies was enamoured by her performance, which he felt confirmed that the actress was "one of Wales's best-kept secrets", and subsequently wrote her a lead role in the Doctor Who spin-off Torchwood. Myles' Torchwood character Gwen Cooper is intimated to be related to Gwyneth in "Journey's End" after the Doctor asks Gwen about her family history. Alan David was cast as Mr Sneed; Gatiss was pleased with the casting, as he had grown up watching David.

=== Filming and effects ===
Although the story is set in 19th-century Cardiff, there were not enough Victorian-looking buildings left in Cardiff for the whole production to film there.

The production filmed one day in Cardiff at the New Theatre on 19 September 2004 for the scene of Dickens' performance. On 20 September, the theatre's exterior, along with Dickens' departure scene, was filmed at Cambrian Place at Swansea Marina. The funeral parlour exterior was the Beaufort Arms Court in Monmouth, recorded on 21 September. More scenes in the Cardiff square were filmed on Church Street and St Mary's Street in Monmouth on 22 September. Small pieces of paper were sprayed as snow, which caused a problem as it scared the horses. However, the snow falling from the sky was a foam substance.

A day of studio recording at the Unit Q2 warehouse in Newport took place on 23 September.

The interiors of Sneed's parlour were shot at Headlands School in Penarth, a former children's home, from 27 September to 2 October. Based on research of Victorian morgues, the production team selected red and sepia as the main colour scheme. When the episode underran, additional scenes and pick-ups were recorded at the school on 19 and 20 October. More scenes at Unit Q2 took place on 22 October, comprising pick-ups and Zoe Thorne recording her scenes as the Gelth. Thorne had been filmed separately as the Gelth head and was used as a template for animation. In other scenes, Thorne had the challenge of matching her voice-overs to the actors who portrayed the bodies animated by the Gelth.

The actors who played the dead bodies possessed by the Gelth had simple make-up, with just shading and contact lenses and no prosthetics. The production team was mindful of the programme's audience, and decided to not have any missing facial features. Originally, visual effects company The Mill planned the computer-generated effects (CGI) to just be the "ethereal swirl", but in the seance scene they ran into the challenge of animating the Gelth's mouth. The Gelth turning red during the seance scene was a "last-minute" change to the visual effects. The Mill overshot their quota of CGI for the episode, and compensated with small swirls in shots that focused on other characters.

== Broadcast and reception ==
"The Unquiet Dead" was first broadcast in the United Kingdom on BBC One on 9 April 2005. In the United States, the episode aired on 24 March 2006 on the Sci-Fi Channel. Overnight figures showed that the episode was watched by 8.3 million viewers in the UK, an audience share of 37%. When final ratings were calculated, figures rose to 8.86 million. The episode received an Audience Appreciation Index score of 80. "The Unquiet Dead" received some criticism from parents, who felt that it was "too scary" for their young children; the BBC dismissed the complaints, saying that it had never been intended for the youngest of children.

Doctor Who novelist and Faction Paradox creator Lawrence Miles posted a scathing review of "The Unquiet Dead" on the Internet within an hour of its broadcast, focusing on a perceived political subtext suggesting that asylum seekers (the Gelth) are really all evil and out to exploit liberal generosity (the Doctor). He criticised the script for promoting xenophobia and "claiming that all foreigners were invaders", especially as the top stories in the news were about immigration into Britain. The review produced considerable backlash on the Internet, mainly over his comments about writer Mark Gatiss. Miles was personally contacted and ran into trouble with his publishers. Miles deleted the review and posted a revision, though the original is still available on another of his websites.

Dek Hogan of Digital Spy stated he "really enjoyed" the episode and it was "beautifully dark". He later described it as "a chilling tale" and "a cracker". Charlie Brooker of The Guardian wrote that the episode "may be the single best piece of family-oriented entertainment BBC has broadcast in its entire history", complimenting that "it's clever, it's funny, it's exciting, it's moving, [...] it looks fantastic, and in places it's genuinely frightening". Brooker also notes a similarity to the style of Nigel Kneale. Now Playing magazine reviewer Arnold T Blumburg gave "The Unquiet Dead" a grade of A−, describing it as "spectacular", though he noted there were "a few hiccups, such as the weak and convenient plot point that forces the Gelth ... to be drawn out of their human hosts by the mere presence of gas". He also criticised Eccleston for making the Doctor appear an "ineffectual goof", and noted that he played no role in the resolution. In 2013, Mark Braxton of Radio Times described the episode as "a sparkling script, as crisp and inviting as a winter wonderland", praising the magical atmosphere and the treatment of Dickens. However, he felt that "the spectral swirlings are all a bit Raiders of the Lost Ark".

In Who Is the Doctor, a guide to the revived series, Graeme Burk felt that "The Unquiet Dead" was "terribly, terribly disappointing" on first viewing, as Rose and the Doctor's characterisation did not drive the plot and the story was reduced to playing it safe and being "ordinary", as it just made the aliens evil instead of discussing their morality. Despite this, he wrote that the story was still enjoyable, with a "delightfully ludicrous" set-up, "vividly realized" period setting, and the characterisation of Dickens. Burk's coauthor, Robert Smith? [sic], called the episode a "complete mess". He felt that Gatiss was attempting to recreate the classic series, but that it came across as "half-hearted". He felt that there was no moral dilemma and Sneed underwent an unsettling character change. While he noted that Eccleston and Piper were "excellent", he felt that Rose and the Doctor's developing relationship was not subtle.
