= Alan David (actor) =

Welsh actor

- Born: Alan Davies; 29 December 1941 (age 84); Merthyr Tydfil, Glamorgan, Wales
- Occupation: Actor
- Years active: 1973–present
- Children: 2

Alan Davies (born 29 December 1941), known professionally as Alan David, is a Welsh actor, best known for his stage and television roles.

== Life and career ==
David was born in Merthyr Tydfil, Glamorgan.

After working in repertory at the Belgrade Theatre, Coventry, and the Victoria Theatre, Stoke, David was a regular performer with the Royal Shakespeare Company between 1970 and 2003, most notably as Touchstone in As You Like It (1977), various rôles in the 1986 revival of Nicholas Nickleby and Polonius in Hamlet (2001). His regular London appearances include parts at the National Theatre, the Almeida Theatre and the Royal Court Theatre.

He has had many television credits ranging from Coronation Street in 1973 and The Sweeney (1975), Making Out (1989-1991) through to Virtual Murder (1992), Honey for Tea and "The Unquiet Dead", an episode of Doctor Who in 2005. He also appeared as Llewellyn, the 'rival' of Boycie, in The Green Green Grass. In 2007 he played Griff in the BBC series Gavin & Stacey.

== Personal life ==
David is married with two sons, and lives in London.

== Filmography ==
=== Film ===
Year	Title	Role	Notes
1980	The Merchant of Venice	Solanio	TV film
1984	Sakharov		TV film
1984	December Flower	Cemetery Superintendent	TV film
1993	Thicker than Water	Chief Superintendent	TV film
1994	Don't Get Me Started	Barry Lewis	
1995	Devil's Advocate	Professor Schlieman	TV film
2000	The Man Who Cried	Welsh Teacher	
2000	The Great Indoors	Cyril Davies	Short film
2002	Dead Gorgeous	Mr. Greeley	TV film
2003	Margery & Gladys	Gordon Thompson	TV film
2003	Ready When You Are, Mr. McGill	Mr. Carter	TV film
2004	Wimbledon	Doctor Taylor	
2006	The Painted Veil	Mr. Garstin	
2008	The Oxford Murders	Mr. Higgins	
2010	The Secret Diaries of Miss Anne Lister	Uncle Lister	TV film
2020	Dream Horse	Bert	

=== Television ===
Year	Title	Role	Notes
1973	Play for Today	Boat Hirer	Episode: "Shakespeare or Bust"
1973	Sam	Roly	Episode: "The Beginning of Winter"
1973	Coronation Street	Glyn Thomas	Recurring role; 11 episodes
1973	Love Story	Mr. Snelling	Episode: "The String-Tying Machine"
1974	The Inheritors	Saunders	Episode: "Did Machiavelli Have Welsh Blood?"
1974–75	Sam	Maurice 'Granny' Naylor	Series regular; 17 episodes
1974–76	Emmerdale	Dick Robertshaw	Recurring role; 6 episodes
1974–77	The Squirrels	Harry Palmer	Series regular; 28 episodes
1975	The Life of Riley	Islwyn Roberts	Episode: "The Visitors"
1975	Crown Court	Police Sergeant Edwards	Episode: "Hunger Strike: Part 3"
1976	Big Boy Now!	Decorator	Episode: "Some Dish"
1976	The Sweeney	Blakeney	Episode: "Loving Arms"
1977	Horizon	Halley	Episode: "The Amazing Doctor Newton"
1979–80	Shoestring	Dr. Ben Fischer	Recurring role; 2 episodes
1980	Enemy at the Door	Feldwebel Fellner	Episode: "From a View to a Death"
1980	Armchair Theatre	Ollie Milton	Episode: "The Circe Complex"
1980	Minder	Chef	Episode: "The Beer Hunter"
1981	Crown Court	Billy Squires	Episode: "Foul Play: Part 1"
1981	Together	Russell Patterson	Recurring role; 3 episodes
1981	Angels	Sales rep	1 episode
1981	Bergerac	Gidleigh	Episode: "Last Chance for a Loser"
1982–84	Foxy Lady	Tancred Taylour	Series regular; 12 episodes
1984	Juliet Bravo	Wilkinson	Episode: "The Day That the Circus Left Town"
1985	There Comes a Time	Dr. Harry Eaton	Series regular; 6 episodes
1985	Summer Season	The Rev. Prothero	Episode: "Pythons on the Mountain"
1985	Bulman	Williams	Episode: "Born into the Purple"
1985	Time for Murder	Jeremy Semper	Episode: "Dust to Dust"
1986	Remington Steele	Newsreader #2	Episode: "Beg, Borrow or Steele"
1986	Love and Marriage	Jack	Episode: "The Clinger"
1986	The Twilight Zone	Security	Episode: "The After Hours"
1987	ScreenPlay	Jerry	Episode: "Road"
1988	How to Be Cool	Mr. Staines	Mini-series; 3 episodes
1989	Hard Cases	Mr. Dyce	1 episode
1989	Screen One	Mr. Smout	Episode: "The Mountain and the Molehill"
1989–91	Making Out	Bernie	Series regular; 24 episodes
1990	Casualty	David Clarke	Episode: "Street Life"
1991	Sleepers	K1	Mini-series; 4 episodes
1991	Gone to the Dogs	Bank Manager	1 episode
1992	Virtual Murder	Professor Griffiths	Series regular; 5 episodes
1992	ScreenPlay	Mr. Cartwright	Episode: "A Little Bit of Lippy"
1993	Inspector Morse	Sir Watkin Davies	Episode: "Twilight of the Gods"
1993	Maigret	Francois Paré	Episode: "Maigret's Boyhood Friend"
1993	Cracker	Hanrahan	Episode: "The Mad Woman in the Attic: Part 1"
1993	Lovejoy	Bible Joe	Episode: "Stones of Destiny"
1993	ScreenPlay	Sir Aeneas MacPherson	Episode: "Boswell & Johnson's Tour of the Western Isles"
1993	Chris Cross	Mr. Rogers	Series regular; 13 episodes
1994	In Suspicious Circumstances	The Chief Constable	Episode: "The Next Mrs. Clements"
1994	Heartbeat	Fillingham	Episode: "Red Herring"
1994	Headhunters	Philip	3 episodes
1994	Peak Practice	Richard Morris	Episode: "Love Thy Neighbour"
1994	Honey for Tea	Dr. Basil Quinn	Series regular; 7 episodes
1995	The Detectives	Sergeant	Episode: "Flash"
1995	Chiller	Dr. Getty	Episode: "Toby"
1996	The Vet	Dennis Eaves	Episode: "Stormy Weather"
1996	The Brittas Empire	Mr. Humphries	Episode: "Snap Happy"
1996	The Legacy of Reginald Perrin	Brian Deacon	1 episode
1996	Hetty Wainthropp Investigates	Bill Jason	Episode: "Lost Chords"
1996	The Thin Blue Line	Gasforth FC Manager	Episode: "Come on You Blues"
1997	The Bill	John Harper	Episode: "An Englishman's Home"
1997	A Perfect State	Gareth	Series regular; 7 episodes
1997	Wokenwell	Rev. Kettle	1 episode
1997	Wing and a Prayer	Dr. Joseph Miller	Episode: "Hello, Goodbye"
1998	Mortimer's Law	Detective Inspector Chisholm	1 episode
1998	Maisie Raine	William Holgate	Episode: "Go Bananas"
1999	Casualty	Christopher Allen	Episode: "Human Traffic"
1999	Goodnight Sweetheart	Clement Attlee MP	Episode: "Accentuate the Positive"
2000	Dirty Work	D.I. Shredder	Recurring role; 3 episodes
2000	In Defence	Fynes	1 episode
2002	The Bill	Mr. Barlow	Episode: "Falling"
2002	Heartbeat	Sam Smithers	Episode: "Sins of the Fathers"
2003	The Murder Game	George Hawick	Recurring role; 4 episodes
2004	The Last Detective	Tecwyn Hughes	Episode: "Benefit to Mankind"
2004	The Catherine Tate Show	Various roles	Episode: "Last Hit"
2005	The Royal	Mr. Forbes	Episode: "While the Cat's Away"
2005	Doctor Who	Gabriel Sneed	Episode: "The Unquiet Dead"
2005	Empire	Quintillus	Recurring role; 4 episodes
2005	Coming Up	Michael	Episode: "Rockabye"
2005	EastEnders	Mr. Banks	2 episodes
2005–09	The Green Green Grass	Llewellyn	Series regular; 16 episodes
2006	High Hopes	Kenton Wolf	Episode: "A Christmas Story"
2007	Holby City	Gerry Culver	Episode: "I Feel Pretty"
2007	Hustle	Vino Vinnie	Episode: "Getting Even"
2007	Gavin & Stacey	Griff	Episode: "The Wedding"
2007	To the Manor Born	Emmeridge	Episode: "Christmas Special"
2011	Land Girls	Dr. Wally Morgan	Episode: "Back to the Land"
2014	Stella	Mr. Mason	1 episode
2014	The Suspicions of Mr Whicher	Magistrate	Episode: "The Ties That Bind"
2014–18	Still Open All Hours	Mr. Bentinck	2 episodes
2015	Benidorm	Glynn Flint	Series 7 regular; 7 episodes
2015	Doc Martin	Mr. Jarvis	Episode: "Education, Education, Education"
2015	The Last Kingdom	Bishop Alewold	1 episode
2016	The Hollow Crown	Bishop of Ely	2 episodes
2017	Holby City	Jimmy Hornby	2 episodes
2018	Silent Witness	Mick Porter	Episode: "Moment of Surrender"
2018	Endeavour	Lambert Kegworth	Episode: "Cartouche"
2018	Sick of It	Priest	Episode: "The Sofa"
2019	Les Misérables	Letter writer	1 episode
2019	The Crown	Ben Bowen Thomas	Episode: "Tywysog Cymru"
2020–2022	The Tuckers	Dai 'Up and Down'	4 episodes
2024	The Way	Rhodri	Episode: "The War"

== Theatre credits ==
Year	Title	Role	Venue	Notes
1995	Volpone	Sir Politic Would-Be	Olivier Theatre, London	
1996	In the Company of Men	Dodds	Barbican Centre, London	with Royal Shakespeare Company
1997	The Shallow End	Toop	Duke of York's Theatre, London	
1997	Henry V	Fluellen / Bishop of Ely	Royal Shakespeare Theatre, Stratford-upon-Avon	with Royal Shakespeare Company
1998	The School for Scandal	Crabtree	Royal Shakespeare Theatre, Stratford-upon-Avon	with Royal Shakespeare Company
2000	Richard II	Gardener	Almeida Theatre, London	
2000	Coriolanus	Sicinius Vellutus	Almeida Theatre, London	
2000	The Tempest	Stephano	Almeida Theatre, London	
2001	The Prisoner's Dilemma	Yuri Petrovian	The Other Place. Stratford-upon-Avon	with Royal Shakespeare Company
2001	Hamlet	Polonius	Royal Shakespeare Theatre, Stratford-upon-Avon	with Royal Shakespeare Company
2002	The Prisoner's Dilemma	Yuri Petrovian	Barbican Centre, London	with Royal Shakespeare Company
2003	Brand	Provost	Swan Theatre, Stratford-upon-Avon & Theatre Royal Haymarket, London	with Royal Shakespeare Company
2009	Jerusalem	The Professor	Royal Court Theatre, London	
2009	Dido, Queen of Carthage	Jupiter/Ilioneus	Dorfman Theatre, London	
2011	Jerusalem	The Professor	Apollo Theatre, London	
2012	The Fairy-Queen	Quince	Glyndebourne Festival Opera, Glyndebourne	
2013	The Captain of Köpenick	Bickersdorff Killian	Olivier Theatre, London	
2013	Much Ado About Nothing	Antonio	The Old Vic, London	
2021	Under Milk Wood	Mr. Pritchard / Mr. Pugh	Olivier Theatre, London	
2022	Jerusalem	The Professor	Apollo Theatre, London	
