= Playing with Fire (Edgar play) =

Playing with Fire is a 2005 play by the British playwright David Edgar, dealing with race relations and multiculturalism. It premiered at the Royal National Theatre in 2005, with a cast including David Troughton and Emma Fielding.
