= Wife (musician) =

Irish electronic musician

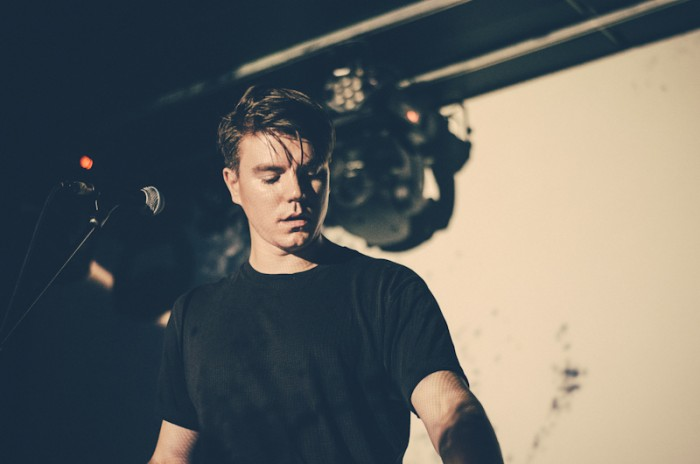
- Wife performing live at Amplifest Porto, 2015 (© Nuno Bernardo / CVLT Nation)

Background information
- Also known as: James Kelly
- Born: James Ó Ceallaigh; Cork, Ireland
- Occupations: Singer; record producer; composer
- Years active: 2012–present
- Labels: Left Blank; Profound Lore; Tri Angle
- Formerly of: Altar of Plagues
- Website: jamesoceallaigh.com

James Ó Ceallaigh, also known as James Kelly and Wife, is an Irish musician, singer, and composer. He is a former member of the group Altar of Plagues. His debut solo studio album, What's Between, was released in 2014 through Tri Angle.

== Early life and education ==
Ó Ceallaigh grew up in the village of Ballinhassig. He studied environmental science at University College Cork and gained a masters in Conservation at University College London.

== Career ==
The first Wife music video was released in 2012 when Pitchfork premiered "Bodies".

The debut Wife studio album, What's Between, was released in 2014 through Tri Angle and featured additional production from the Haxan Cloak, Lie, and Roly Porter. The music video for the song "Heart Is a Far Light" was released in 2014.

Ó Ceallaigh participated in the 2014 edition of the Red Bull Music Academy, which took place in Tokyo, Japan.

== Touring ==
In 2014, Wife made his debut in the United States, performing at Decibel Festival in Seattle as well as in New York, Los Angeles, San Francisco and Philadelphia. Wife has toured with the acts Zola Jesus and Liars. In September 2016, Wife toured with Animal Collective. In 2016, Wife embarked on a month long European tour with Oathbreaker. Wife has performed at Sónar editions in Barcelona (2015) and Reykjavík (2016).

== Further musical work ==
In 2014, Wife remixed the Dillinger Escape Plan single "One of Us is the Killer". In 2015, Wife co-wrote and co-produced the track "Waves" for Haleek Maul. In 2015, Wife remixed AlunaGeorge single "Supernatural". Kelly co-produced the Zola Jesus single "Siphon" from the 2017 album Okovi. The single was named Best New Music by Pitchfork.

In 2020, under the name "James Kelly", he composed the soundtrack for the Quibi series The Stranger', which was later edited into a feature film for the Hulu streaming service. In 2024, he scored the final season of the TV series Snowpiercer. In 2026, he composed the soundtrack for the film The Surgeon as "James Ó Ceallaigh".

== Discography ==
=== Studio albums ===
- What's Between (2014, Tri Angle)

=== EPs ===
- Stoic (2012, Left Blank)
- Standard Nature (2016, Profound Lore)
