= Yuri Kolokolnikov =

Russian stage and film actor (born 1980)

- Юрий Колокольников
- Kolokolnikov in 2026
- Born: Yuri Andreevich Kolokolnikov; 15 December 1980 (age 45); Moscow, RSFSR, USSR
- Citizenship: Russia; Canada
- Occupations: Actor; film director; film producer
- Years active: 1994–present
- Partner: Vilma Kutavičiūtė (2024–present) Kseniya Rappoport (until 2014)
- Children: 2
- Awards: Laureate of the Theatrical Prize "Chaika" 2003 Laureate of the Youth Prize "Triumph" 2004 Nominee for the Actor Award for Outstanding Performance 2026
- Website: https://www.instagram.com/yurikolokolnikovofficial/

Yuri Andreevich Kolokolnikov (Russian: Юрий Андреевич Колокольников; born 15 December 1980) is a Russian stage and film actor. In the West, Kolokolnikov is best known for his performance as Styr in the television series Game of Thrones and as Gennadi Bystrov in The Americans and Vlad in the third season of HBO’s The White Lotus. His film credits include Christopher Nolan’s Tenet (2020), Darren Aronofsky’s Caught Stealing (2025), and Roshan Sethi’s The Surgeon (2026). He shared an Actor Award nomination for Outstanding Performance by an Ensemble in a Drama Series with the cast of The White Lotus.

== Early life ==
Kolokolnikov was born in the Soviet Union. In 1985, he emigrated to Canada with his mother and older brother, while his father remained in Moscow. He began his acting career in Russia and has since lived in both Russia and Los Angeles.

== Career ==
He has appeared in more than forty films since 1998. Kolokolnikov met with director Kirill Serebrennikov, who invited him for a role in the television series Diary of a Killer in the staging of Sweet Bird of Youth at the theater Sovremennik Theatre. The premiere took place in 2002.

In 2014, he played the role of Styr, Magnar of Thenn, in the fourth season of the television series Game of Thrones.

He had a lead role in the Russian 2016 comedy film Breakfast with Daddy. The film is about a wealthy man who discovers that he has a 10 year old daughter.

In the 2017 American action-comedy The Hitman's Bodyguard, Kolokolnikov played a Belarusian mercenary leader Ivan.

In 2024, Yura played Koroviev in the adaptation of The Master and Margarita.

In 2025, Kolokolnikov played Vlad in the third season of The White Lotus and Aleksei in Caught Stealing. For The White Lotus, he was nominated with his castmates for Outstanding Performance by an Ensemble in a Drama Series at the 32nd Actor Awards.

In 2026, he played Cole in Roshan Sethi’s action thriller The Surgeon, alongside Michelle Yeoh and Martin Freeman. The film had its world premiere in the Centrepiece program of the Toronto International Film Festival. That year, he also played the title role in Levsha and Maxim Kammerer in Polden, an adaptation of the Strugatsky brothers’ novel Beetle in the Anthill.

== Personal life ==
Kolokolnikov is married to Lithuanian actress Vilma Kutavičiūtė. He has two daughters from previous relationships, including a daughter with actress Kseniya Rappoport.

== Selected filmography ==
Year	Title	Role	Notes
2000	The Envy of Gods		
2001	In August of 1944	Lt. Blinov	
2004	Children of the Arbat	Kostya	TV series
2005	The State Counsellor	Smolianinov	
2005	Deadly Force	Malyshev	TV series, 6th season, episode "Good Intentions"
2008	Plus One	puppets	
2010	Happy Ending	penis	Russian comedy, based on a short story by Gogol "The Nose"
2011	Raspoutine	Oswald Rayner	
2013	Intimate Parts	Ivan	
2014	Game of Thrones	Styr	
2014	Iron Ivan	Count Korsakov	
2014	Love Does Not Love	Dmitriy 'Dima'	
2015	The Transporter Refueled	Yuri	
2015	About Love	Familiar Miyako (note Re)	
2015	The Method	Mikhael Ptakha	TV series, episode 12
2016	Breakfast With Daddy	Sasha Titov	
2016	The Duelist	Basargin	
2017	The Hitman's Bodyguard	Ivan	
2017	You All Infuriate Me	Artyom	TV series
2017–18	The Americans	Gennadi Bystrov	TV series, 5 episodes in seasons 5 and 6
2018	Hunter Killer	Agent Oleg	
2019	The Humorist	Maxim Shelepin	
2019	Viy 2: Journey to China	Peter the Great	
2019	6 Underground	Baasha Zia	
2020	Tenet	Volkov	
2020	The Silver Skates	Grand prince	
2022	We	Panda	
2023	The Master and Margarita	Korovyev	
2023	Wish of the Fairy Fish	Lord Rothman	
2024	Kraven the Hunter	Semyon Chorney	
2025	The Wizard of the Emerald City	Tin Woodman	
2025	Caught Stealing	Aleksei	
2026	The Surgeon	Cole	

== Awards ==
- Scholarship prize of business circles "Kumir-1999"
- Laureate of the Theatrical Prize "Chaika" (2003)
- Laureate of the Youth Prize "Triumph" (2004)
- Nominee for the Actor Award for Outstanding Performance by an Ensemble in a Drama Series, shared with the cast of The White Lotus (2026)
