= Joan Iyiola =

British-Nigerian actress

Joan Iyiola (born 1 August 1987) is a British-Nigerian actress, writer, director and producer based in London. She is best known for playing the title role in The Duchess of Malfi at the RSC, Dọlápọ̀ Is Fine and Mango.

== Early life ==
Born in London to Nigerian parents, Iyiola initially trained to be a barrister and read law at Emmanuel College, Cambridge University. Whilst studying, she worked with Annie Castledine, Complicité and Robert Icke. Following seasons at the National Youth Theatre of Great Britain she was awarded a place at Bristol Old Vic Theatre School.

== Career ==
=== Theatre ===
Iyiola began her career at the RSC, playing in: A Midsummer Night's Dream, The White Devil, Arden of Faversham, The Roaring Girl, A Life of Galileo, Boris Godunov, The Orphan of Zhao. In 2013, Iyiola starred opposite Chiwetel Ejiofor as Pauline Lumumba in A Season in the Congo at The Young Vic, directed by Joe Wright.

At the Gate Theatre, Iyiola played in The Convert, The Rise and Shine of Comrade Fiasco and in the 2015 European Premiere of Eclipsed by Danai Gurira alongside Letitia Wright, her portrayal of Bessie was described as "Poignantly funny" and the play received several 5 star reviews, including TimeOut and WhatsOnStage.

In 2016, Iyiola performed in They Drink it in the Congo for The Almeida theatre and Omeros at Shakespeare's Globe. In 2017, Omeros transferred from the Sam Wanamaker Playhouse to the Jazz festival in St Lucia, where it was performed with Joseph Marcell. In 2017, Iyiola starred in Boudica alongside Gina Mckee at Shakespeare's Globe.

In 2018, Iyiola returned to the RSC to work with Director Maria Åberg, starring as The Duchess of Malfi in the Royal Shakespeare Company's 2018 summer season. Iyiola is the first black woman to play The Duchess in a major production. Her performance was met with praise from the British press, the Guardian's Michael Billington wrote, "Any production, however, pivots on the performance of the Duchess, and Iyiola – following a long line of distinguished RSC forebears including Peggy Ashcroft, Judi Dench and Harriet Walter – acquits herself excellently." Dominic Cavendish, chief theatre critic at the Telegraph commented, "Superb as the Duchess, Joan Iyiola is first fierce, proud and stylish". In The Times, Maxie Szalwinska highlighted, "Iyiola's raw-voiced final lament summons wider agonies of racial and feminist struggle. She dies, but still, somehow, she rises".

In 2019, Iyiola returned to the Young Vic Theatre to play Ofentse in Tree, a show co-created by Kwame Kwei-Armah and Idris Elba. The show opened at the Manchester International Festival, before transferring to the Young Vic for a London run. In 2021, she reopened the Young Vic after the pandemic in a two-hander, Changing Destiny, written by Ben Okri.

=== Apatan Productions ===
Joan is co-founder of Apatan Productions, a Film and TV production company based in London and set up in 2018. Joan co-wrote, produced and acted in Dọlápọ̀ Is Fine which was shot under Bumble’s Female Film Force Fund. The film was delivered in Jan 2020 and premiered at American Black Film Festival where it won the 2020 HBO Short Film Competition. The short was recently seen at 64th BFI LFF, and is competing in a range of festivals worldwide. Dọlápọ̀ Is Fine has recently been acquired by Netflix and HBO and is distributed worldwide by the International Production & Distribution company Salaud Morisset.

Joan was recently named as one of Digital Spy’s 30 Black British Stars of Tomorrow, and BFI Network x BAFTA’s Crew for 2021. Joan is Co-Founder of The Mono Box, a non-profit organisation supporting emerging artists in theatre and film.

== Credits ==
=== Film and television ===
Year	Title	Type	Role	Notes
2016	New Blood	TV series	Karen Andrews	Episode 3 &4
2016	Denial	Film	Laura Constantine	Directed by Mick Jackson
2016	The Dead Sea	Short Film	Olu	Film supported by Human Rights Watch and MSF
2016	Yonderland	TV series	Huffy Waitress	1 Episode
2018	Black Earth Rising	TV series	Beatrix Audifax	Episode 3
2018	Show Dogs	Film	Afghan	Directed by Raja Gosnell
2018	Enterprice	TV series	Fatima	3 Episodes by Kayode Ewumi
2019	NYX	Short Film	Adi	Fox Digital
2020	Dọlápọ̀ Is Fine	Short Film	Daisy	Apatan Productions
2020	DEE DEE	Short Film	Grace	Film 4

=== Video game ===
Year	Title	Role	Notes
2025	Vampire: The Masquerade – Bloodlines 2	Ysabella Moore (voice)	Also "The Flower & the Flame" DLC

=== Radio ===
Year	Title	Station
2012	Skyvers	BBC Radio 3
2015	Sunita	BBC Radio 3
2017	Girls	BBC Radio 4
