= Welcome to Lagos (novel) =

2016 novel by Chibundu Onuzo

- 2017 Faber & Faber edition
- Author: Chibundu Onuzo
- Language: English
- Genre: Literary Fiction, Romance
- Set in: Lagos, Nigeria
- Publisher: Catapult & Co. Faber & Faber
- Publication date: 1 May 2016
- Publication place: Nigeria
- Media type: Print (hardcover)
- Pages: 304 pp (first edition)
- ISBN: 978-1-936787-80-7 (first edition)
- OCLC: 993037824

Welcome to Lagos is a 2016 novel written by Nigeria writer Chibundu Onuzo. It was first published on 1 May 2016, by Catapult & Co., an imprint of Black Balloon Publishing.

== Plot summary ==
The novel follows Chike Ameobi; a Nigerian soldier who opted to retire rather than killing innocent civilians; Yemi; a private and junior to Chike Ameobi who admires Ameobi's uprightness and also decides to quit with him. On their way, they met Oma; who called her marriage quit due to abuse; Isoken; a sixteen-year-old girl who managed to escape from the hands of the rebel fighters; FineBoy; an ex-militant, who ran away from militancy to chase his dream as a radio presenter. The novel describes the daily struggle of the common man in Lagos; the mischievousness and flamboyance of corrupt politicians and the need to survive.
