= White Tomb =

Studio album by Altar of Plagues
- Released: 14 April 2009
- Recorded: 2009
- Genre: Atmospheric black metal, post-metal
- Length: 49:59
- Label: Profound Lore
- Producer: Ross O'Donovan, Altar of Plagues

Altar of Plagues chronology
'Sol' (2008)	White Tomb (2009)	'Tides' (2010)

Professional ratings
Review scores
Source	Rating
Decibel	link
Rock Sound	8/10 stars
Terrorizer	8.5/10 stars

White Tomb is the debut album by Irish atmospheric black metal band Altar of Plagues. It was recorded at Data Studios, Kerry.

== Track listing ==
No.	Title	Length
1.	"Earth I: As a Womb"	12:03
2.	"Earth II: As a Furnace"	15:01
3.	"Through the Collapse III: Watchers Restrained"	9:48
4.	"Through the Collapse IV: Gentian Truth"	13:10
Total length:		49:59

== Personnel ==
Altar of Plagues

- James Kelly – vocals, guitars, keyboards
- Jeremiah Spillane – guitars
- Dave Condon – bass, vocals
- S. MacAnri – drums

Guest musicians

- Stephen Lordan - guest vocals on "Gentian Truth"
- Nathan Misterek - guest vocals on "Earth: As a Furnace" and "Gentian Truth"

Production and recording

- Ross O'Donovan - recording and mixing
- Jason Carroll - assistant engineering
- Colin Marston - mastering
