= BBC West Midlands =

English region of the BBC

BBC Midlands

- BBC West Midlands's area within the UK
- TV transmitters: Ridge Hill; Sutton Coldfield; The Wrekin
- Radio stations: BBC Radio WM; BBC CWR; BBC Hereford and Worcester; BBC Radio Shropshire; BBC Radio Stoke; BBC Radio Derby; BBC Radio Gloucestershire
- Headquarters: The Mailbox, Birmingham
- Area: Herefordshire; Shropshire; Staffordshire; Warwickshire; West Midlands; Worcestershire; Northern Gloucestershire; Northern Oxfordshire; North West Leicestershire; South-western Derbyshire parts of Wales (Presteigne)
- Nation: BBC English Regions
- Regions: West Midlands and parts of the East Midlands, South West and South East.
- Key people: Cath Hearne (Head of Regional & Local Programmes)
- Launch date: 1927

BBC West Midlands is the BBC English Region producing local radio and web content for the City of Birmingham, West Midlands, Herefordshire, Shropshire, Staffordshire, Warwickshire, Worcestershire and parts of Gloucestershire. Originally containing the BBC East Midlands, the service retains the BBC Midlands name and brand, with its history dating from 1927, for public use. It was known as the Midland Region from 1927 until c. 1974.

The directorate is known internally as BBC Midlands, despite only serving the West Midlands transmission region.

== Services ==
=== Television ===
The BBC Midlands region carries a number of regional programmes today. The regular schedule consists of the flagship Midlands Today news programme, regional news bulletins, Politics England airs for half an hour on Sunday mornings and other regional commissions air throughout the year.

=== Local Radio ===
The region is the controlling centre for BBC Radio WM, BBC CWR, BBC Hereford and Worcester, BBC Radio Stoke and BBC Radio Shropshire.

Some of this programming is simulcast with the radio stations in the BBC East Midlands region, and overnight BBC Radio 5 Live is simulcast.

=== Online and Interactive ===
BBC Midlands produces regional news for the BBC News website, as well as exclusive podcasts for the BBC Sounds app. Until 2012 they produced local pages for Ceefax, which was replaced by services on BBC Red Button.

In 2005 a year long pilot of 'Local TV', an interactive service which provided TV for the local radio station coverage areas, was conducted. The pilot was not successful and did not expand out across the other English Regions.

== History ==
=== Early years ===
BBC Midlands is the oldest of the BBC English Regions, having been formed (as the Midland Region) in 1927, when the new Borough Hill high-powered radio transmitter at Daventry became the first to replace the earlier lower-powered city-based radio stations, such as Birmingham's 5IT, and make regional and national broadcasting a technical possibility.

The Daventry transmitter broadcast two channels, and as further regional transmission stations followed (starting with London's Brookmans Park in 1929), this quickly established the pattern for pre-war broadcasting. 5XX from Daventry (later – from 7 October 1934 – from Droitwich) carried the BBC National Programme originating in London, while 5GB broadcast the BBC Regional Programme, the regional controller of which was free to schedule, as he saw fit, a mix of networked programming from London, regional programmes produced by the Birmingham base, and items taken from the output of other regions.

The first director of the new Midland regional service was Percy Edgar, who had been the announcer and Head of Programming for 5IT on its opening night in 1922 and was to be the dominant figure in Midlands broadcasting from its birth until 1945. Edgar was a strong believer in the value of local production and fought to establish the Midland Region as an independent source of programming, pioneering community-focussed initiatives such as the Midland Parliament programme, where members of the public debated controversial issues on air with major public figures.

By 1935, the BBC's Midland Region covered an area extending from The Potteries to Norfolk and was producing 40% of its broadcast output itself - a greater proportion even than that of BBC Scotland. With 14 producers, it was the largest BBC department outside London.

=== The television era ===
Regional radio was suspended during World War II, but in July 1945, the BBC Home Service was launched on a similar regional basis to the pre-war Regional Programme. The Midlands Region continued under new director Dennis Morris in the independent and innovative vein established by Edgar – pioneering on-air listener feedback with Listeners Answer Back in 1946 and launching the longest-running and most popular programme in the history of radio – The Archers – at the beginning of 1951.

Despite these successes, two technological developments gradually started to make the old regional system untenable. The development of FM radio made it possible to fit a far greater number of channels into the spectrum without conflict and interference, which opened the possibility of more towns and cities having their own radio stations. The Midlands Region opened the BBC's first local radio station, BBC Radio Leicester, in 1967, and with many more of these planned, the relevance of the regional radio station broadcasting from the Welsh border to the North Sea was immediately cast into doubt.

Television was also presenting more of a threat than an opportunity. Although the Midlands had been the first area outside London to receive television coverage with the opening of the Sutton Coldfield transmitting station in 1949, the greater cost of television production compared to radio meant that it was always going to be a more centralised service.

A television studio was opened in Birmingham in 1950 and early successes included Come Dancing in 1949 – the first regionally produced television programme to establish itself as a regular in the national network schedule - and Midlands Today in 1964, one of the UK's first daily regional news programmes. Regional television had been established in 1957 with the launch of local evening news bulletins. Although it fared better than the struggling BBC North or BBC West (which was threatened for a while with being absorbed by the Midlands Region), it was clear that if BBC Midlands was too large to be truly local in the radio market, it was equally too small to be as self-sufficient across the full range of television programming as it had been in radio.

=== Division of the Region ===
The result was the radical shakeup that took place following the publication of the Broadcasting in the Seventies report in 1969. The eastern part of the region was reborn as the Norwich-based BBC East, with both it and the smaller remaining BBC Midlands focussing entirely on regional television (primarily regional news) and local radio. Regional radio ceased almost entirely (save for regional opt-outs on Radio 4 until 1980), and all television and radio production for national networks was transferred to the separate BBC Birmingham network production centre.

The cost of television production technology decreased throughout the 1980s and 1990s and this had several effects on the BBC in the Midlands. Smaller, more local channels became viable. The BBC's Midlands coverage had long been accused of being excessively Birmingham-centric, and in 1991, television broadcasting from the Waltham transmitting station and the BBC Radio Leicester, BBC Radio Nottingham and BBC Radio Derby radio stations were given over to a new Nottingham-based BBC East Midlands.

A more radical move in this direction took place in 2006 when the BBC Midlands Region piloted the BBC's Local TV initiative, with television news programmes produced for six local areas, all much smaller than the traditional TV regions, and in the case of Birmingham and the Black Country, even smaller than those covered by local radio stations. This programming was broadcast on digital television and over the internet only. The experiment came to an end as planned in September 2006 and has not been repeated since.

On the 15 January 2021, BBC Radio launched a new temporary station called BBC Radio Wolverhampton.

== Studios ==
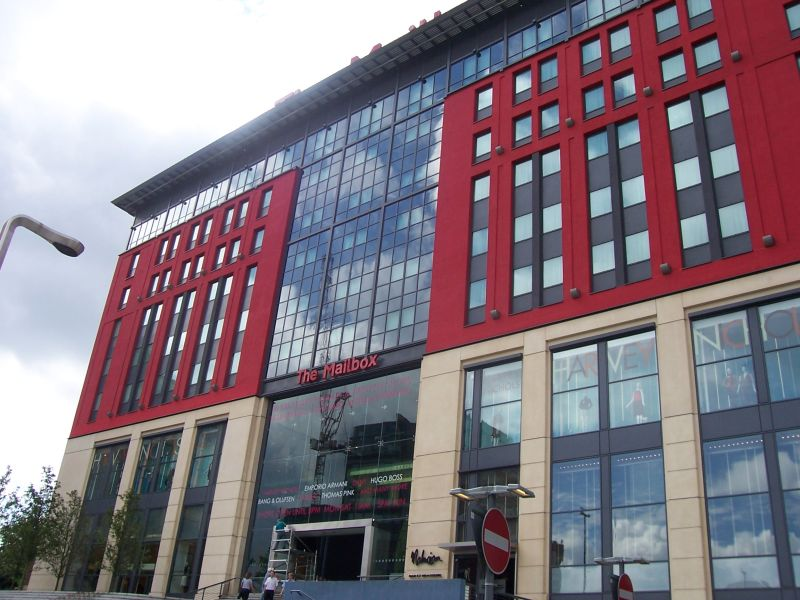
The Mailbox, home of BBC West Midlands since 2004

The first studios used by BBC Midlands were offices and a small studio in Broad Street, Birmingham; however, these became too small for the expanding region. Regional News remained at Broad Street until 1971, the small studio being ideal for news bulletins, while other productions took place in a former cinema in Gosta Green and a regency mansion in Carpenter Road, Edgbaston.

In 1971, all of these operations were condensed into a new integrated studio complex, Pebble Mill Studios. Pebble Mill became iconic because it featured in some of the most popular programming of the 1970s. Pebble Mill had two studios, Studio A for major productions and Studio B, for Midlands Today and other local programming. When the complex was built, it was intended that there should be a Studio C for drama production; however, this never happened, and instead the foyer of the building was used as an extra studio, complete with the gallery and facilities built in for Studio C. A conservatory studio was also built that held Good Morning with Anne and Nick for many years. The new studios encompassed network and regional productions and radio, and was the Headquarters for BBC English Regions.

By the 1990s, change meant Pebble Mill's future was uncertain. Advances in technology made outside broadcasts cheaper and much more common, while also increasing the scope for independent and outsourced television production. In combination, these meant that much television programming could increasingly be produced without the need for the sort of large integrated studio complexes represented by Pebble Mill. In addition, the building was getting costly to heat and maintain. In 2000, Studio A was closed, following the need to make savings at the corporation, and plans were made to dispose of Pebble Mill.

In 2004, productions split two ways. BBC Midlands, Midlands Today, BBC Radio WM, BBC English Regions and the network production base BBC Birmingham moved to The Mailbox in Birmingham city centre, with many of the productions moving to the BBC Drama Village. The Mailbox contains the studios, a newsroom and radio facilities, all of which have windows allowing the public to view how their television and radio is made.

It was announced in August 2022, that BBC Birmingham will leave The Mailbox for the new creative quarter in Digbeth, Birmingham from 2026. The new broadcast centre will occupy the former Typhoo Tea factory. By then, in adjacent studios, the BBC’s flagship show Masterchef would have already taken up residence. The move coincides with BBC’s lease at The Mailbox coming to an end, having been located there since the move from Pebble Mill in 2004.

In addition to the main headquarters, BBC Midlands has local radio stations and news bureaux located in Coventry, Gloucester, Shrewsbury, Stoke-on-Trent, and Worcester.

== See also ==
- BBC English Regions

== References and further reading ==
- Briggs, Asa (1961–1995). The History of Broadcasting in the United Kingdom (Volumes I-V). Oxford University Press.
