= Altar of Plagues =

Irish extreme metal band

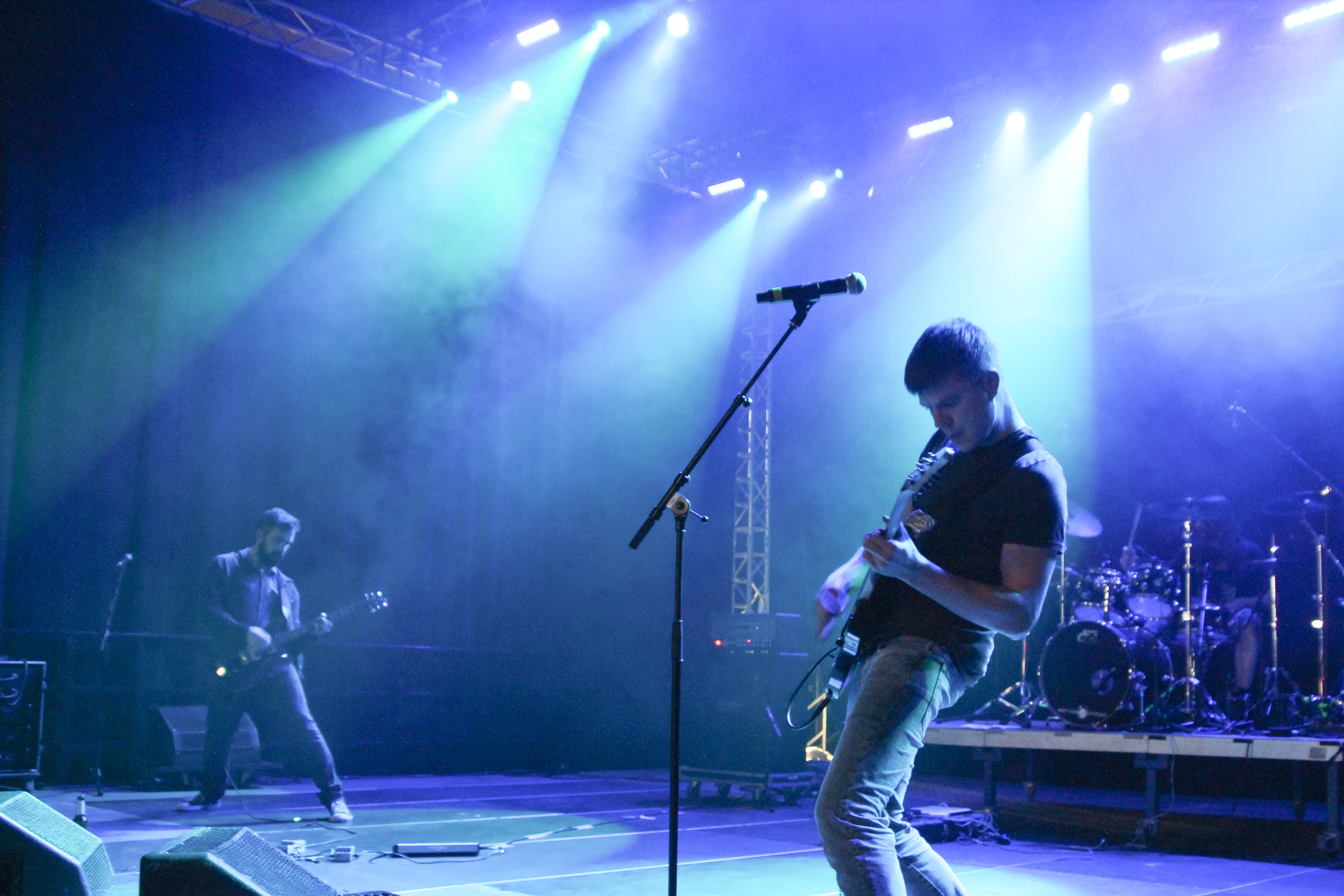
- At the Wave-Gotik-Treffen 2013

Background information
- Origin: Cork, Ireland
- Genres: Atmospheric black metal, post-black metal, dark ambient
- Years active: 2006–2013, 2015
- Labels: Profound Lore, Candlelight
- Members: James Kelly; Johnny King
- Past members: Dave Condon; Jeremiah Spillane; Bryan O' Sullivan
- Website: www.altarofplagues.com

Altar of Plagues were an Irish black metal band, founded in Cork by James Kelly. After gaining attention in the metal community with a series of self recorded demos and EPs, the band released their first studio album, White Tomb, in April 2009 on Profound Lore Records. Following a year of gigging and some changes to the lineup, the group signed with Candlelight Records in January 2010. They released their second album Mammal in 2011, with US/Can and ROW editions featuring alternate artworks. The album's tour included a European headline tour and festival appearances such as the Hopscotch Music Festival in the US.

Their third album, Teethed Glory and Injury, was released in 2013 and met with critical acclaim. Terrorizer named it #2 on "Terrorizer 50 Albums Of The Year 2013".

On 15 June 2013, Altar of Plagues announced via Facebook that they were splitting up and that their final live performance would be at the Unsound Festival in Poland in October. However, in January 2015, after teasing it for weeks, they announced a few shows to take place in early 2015. In late 2015, the band announced they would embark on one last tour across mainland Europe with fellow Irish band Malthusian (with whom Altar of Plagues' drummer Johnny King also plays). Their final performance was at the Damnation Festival 2015. Kelly now releases music under the name Wife, while Johnny King drums for the doom metal band Conan.

== Members ==
Final lineup

- James Kelly – guitar, vocals, keyboards (2006–2013, 2015), drums (2006–2008)
- Johnny King – drums (2008–2013, 2015)

Previous members

- Dave Condon – bass, vocals (2006–2013)
- Bryan O'Sullivan – guitar (2006–2008; live 2015)
- Jeremiah Spillane – guitar (2006–2010)

Live musicians

- Stavros Giannopoulos – guitar (2012)
- Joe Noel – bass (2012)

Timeline

== Discography ==
=== Studio albums ===
- White Tomb (2009)
- Mammal (2011)
- Teethed Glory and Injury (2013)

=== Demos and EPs ===
- First Plague (2006)
- Through the Cracks of the Earth (2007)
- Sol (2008)
- Tides (2010)
- Split with Year of No Light (2011)
