= 5IT =

English radio station

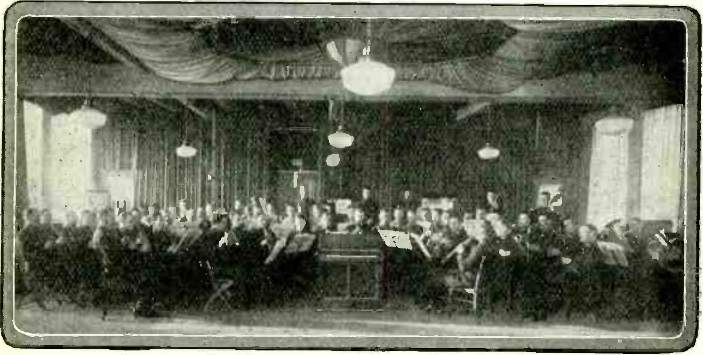
The BBC's radio studio in Birmingham, from the BBC Hand Book 1928, which described it as "Europe's largest studio".

5IT was a British Broadcasting Company (later BBC) radio station which broadcast from Birmingham, England, between 1922 and 1927.

Birmingham was the first British city outside London to have a radio service from the newly formed British Broadcasting Company, with 5IT starting regular broadcasting from its temporary Witton base at 17:00 on 15 November 1922, one day after 2LO started daily BBC broadcasting from London and one hour before the 18:00 launch of Manchester's 2ZY. The transmitter was located at Birmingham City Council's Summer Lane electricity generating station.

5IT pioneered many innovations in early broadcasting, launching Children's Hour in 1922, developing sophisticated methods of programme control and employing the first full-time announcers in 1923. The station's first announcer on its opening night was its general manager Percy Edgar, who was to be the dominant figure in Birmingham broadcasting and the BBC's most influential regional director until his retirement in 1948.

5IT moved its studios from Witton to a former cinema in New Street in 1923, moving again in January 1926 to a completely new, custom-designed building in Broad Street with two studios – one, at 45 by 50 feet (14 by 15 m), the largest in the country, if not Europe. The Broad Street studios now controlled and made programmes for a region stretching across central England from The Potteries to Norfolk.

From 21 August 1927 the low-powered city station 5IT was replaced by the 5GB (the BBC Midland Region) – the first of the BBC's regional services – broadcast from the new high powered Daventry transmitting station at Borough Hill near Daventry.
