= Maurice Flynn =

Maurice or Morris Flynn may refer to:

- Maurice Flynn (presenter) (born 1976), BBC journalist and presenter
- Maurice Bennett Flynn (1892–1959), American college football player and actor
- Maurice Flynn (hurler) (1865–1936), Irish hurler
- Morris Flynn, character in The Man Who Was Sherlock Holmes
