= Stirk =

Stirk is a surname of Norse origin. Notable people with the surname include:

- Cornelius Stirk, fictional character
- Craig Stirk (born 1957), South African cricketer
- Graham Stirk, British architect
- Hellen Stirk (died 1544), Scottish Protestant martyr
- John Stirk (born 1955), English former football right-back
- Ryan Stirk (born 2000), English-born football midfielder
- Samuel Stirk (1756–1793), English attorney
- Sarah Stirk, British television presenter

== See also ==
- Cattle#Terminology, a stirk is a yearling calf
