= Priya Kaur-Jones =

British newsreader (born 1979)

Priya Kaur-Jones (born 1979 in Walton, Wakefield) is a British newsreader.

== Early life ==
Kaur-Jones was born in 1979 in Walton near Wakefield in West Yorkshire, and attended Wakefield Girls' High School. After completing her A-levels in French, Chemistry, General studies and biology, she began a three-year Genetics degree at the University of Nottingham, graduating in July 2000. She subsequently completed a postgraduate degree in Broadcast Journalism at Sheffield Hallam University.

Her father is a Christian from England and her mother is a Sikh from Delhi.

== Career ==
Kaur-Jones began her career in 2001 when she worked at Fosseway Radio in Leicestershire. Later in 2001 she was a runner up in the Miss India UK competition. In 2002 she started work at BBC Asian Network Radio where she read the news bulletins and was soon made the reporter for the East Midlands. She then moved to BBC East Midlands Today, where she presented the breakfast, lunchtime and weekend news bulletins, and filed news reports.

In December 2005, she joined Five News, claiming to be the youngest national news reader. After a year with Sky, she returned to the BBC to present the BBC Politics Show in the East Midlands. In 2004 and 2005, she presented the Miss India UK competition.

She joined GMTV in August 2007, initially as a correspondent. In 2008, she was given the role of newsreader (6 am – 7 am weekdays). She left in September 2009 and moved to the Middle East. She is currently making documentaries and working in advertising.

In 2011 Priya joined France 24 as a newsreader.

== Personal life ==
Kaur-Jones currently resides in the Middle East. She is a qualified holistic massage therapist. She completed the London Marathon in 2009 in a time of 7 hours 58 minutes carrying a 7 ft by 14 ft model of a submarine with three other individuals, including well known charity fundraiser Lloyd Scott.
