= Noel-Baker Academy =

Location
- Bracknell Drive; Derby, Derbyshire, DE24 0HR; England
- 52°52′58″N 1°26′20″W

Information
- Type: Academy
- Established: 1960
- Founder: Derby City Council
- Trust: LEAD Multi-Academy Trust
- Department for Education URN: 143853 Tables
- Ofsted: Reports
- Headteacher: Paul Greenhough
- Staff: 72 plus 90 associated staff
- Gender: Co-educational
- Age: 11 to 16
- Enrolment: 1239
- Houses: Lead, Empower, Achieve, Drive
- Colours: Orange, Royal Blue, Blue, Burgundy
- Website: http://www.noel-baker.derby.sch.uk

Noel-Baker Academy (formerly Noel-Baker Community School) is a co-educational secondary school located in Alvaston, Derby, England.

The school takes students from the Alvaston, Boulton and Crewton areas of Derby.In September 2004, the school was awarded specialist school status as a Language College by the Department for Education and Skills (DfES).

Previously a foundation school administered by Derby City Council, in February 2017, Noel-Baker Community School converted to academy status and was renamed Noel-Baker Academy. The school is now sponsored by the LEAD Multi-Academy Trust.

The school was named after Olympic silver medallist, Derby South MP and Nobel Peace prize winner, Philip Noel-Baker.In keeping with the values of its namesake, the school made international headlines by 'allowing' the students to 'take the knee' in honour of English footballer Marcus Rashford (the mural had been vandalised) and the Black Lives Matter movement.

== Ofsted judgements ==
The school's was inspected by Ofsted in 2018, with the judgement of Inadequate: Special Measures. It was inspected again in 2022, with the judgement of Good.

== New building ==
The old building, over 50 years old and now demolished, has been replaced with a new building constructed on the old playing fields. The new building was ready for the beginning of the school year in September 2012 at a cost of £34 million. The 1,150 pupils have combined with 90 pupils from St.Martin's Special School which educates special needs students.

== Notable former pupils ==
- Glenda Bailey, editor of US fashion magazine Harper's Bazaar
- Christopher Jackson, geologist
- Ivan Gaskell, BBC sports presenter
- Tony Franklin - "The Fretless Monster" Bass Guitarist
