= Self-Portrait with Cigarette =

Painting by Edvard Munch

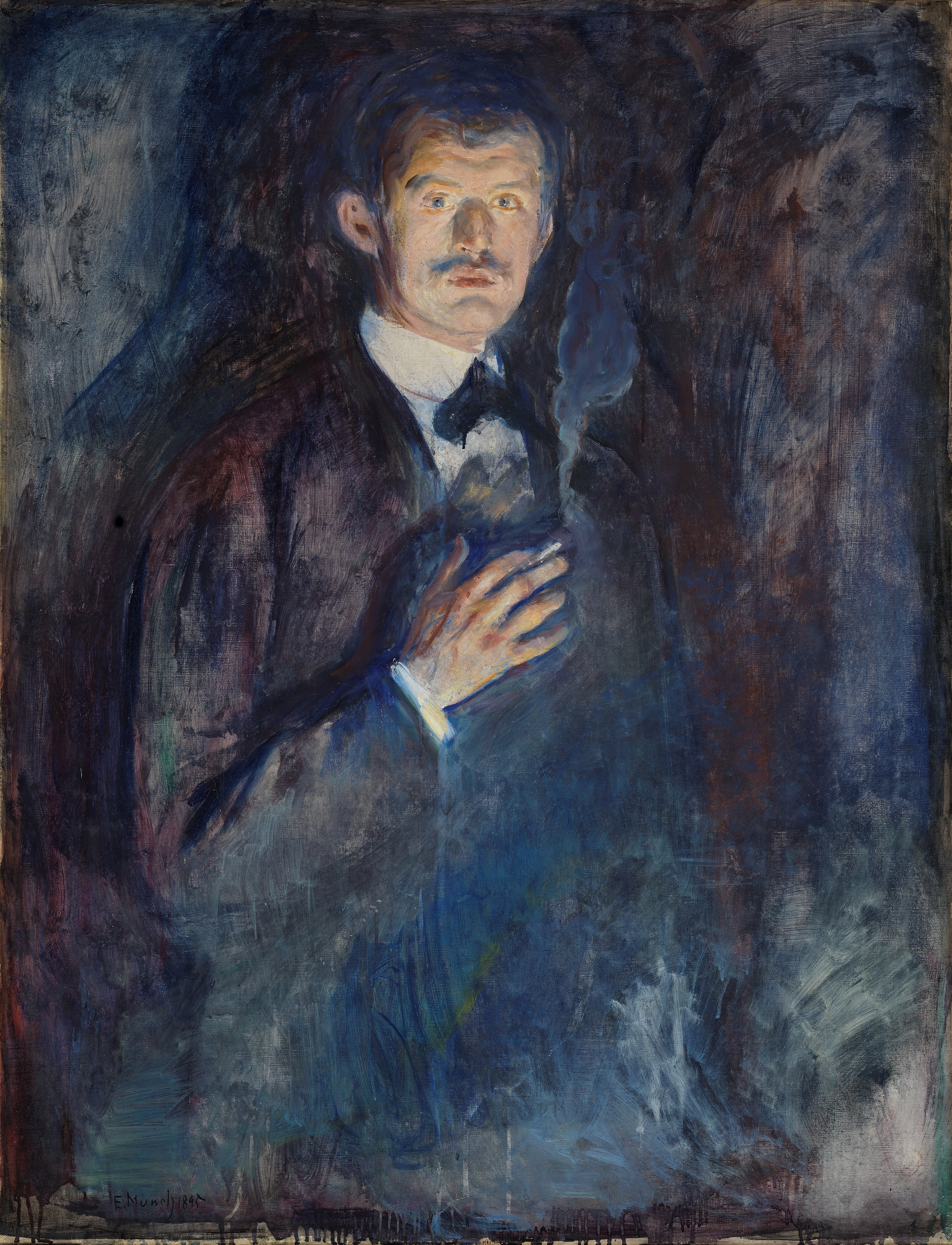
- Artist: Edvard Munch
- Year: 1895
- Medium: oil on canvas
- Dimensions: 110.5 cm × 85.5 cm (43.5 in × 33.7 in)
- Location: National Gallery, Oslo

Self-Portrait with Cigarette (Norwegian: Selvportrett med sigarett) is an 1895 painting by the Norwegian artist Edvard Munch. Munch's use of the cigarette and physical decay as a rejection of societal values aroused controversy following the self-portrait's 1895 exhibition. As of 2021, the work is held by the National Gallery in Oslo.

== Composition ==
The artist is surrounded by a dark shadow as he holds a smoking cigarette. John Ravenal compares the painting's dramatic lighting to that of a stage. Sue Prideaux writes that "Munch appears from the cigarette smoke like a genie from a bottle". The cigarette, which the art historian Patricia Berman calls "a nexus for marginal social identities in the 1890s", was a symbol for "deviancy" and the "social dissolution" between class and gender boundaries. Thus, its inclusion in the self-portrait rejects traditional values and associates Munch with bohemianism and decadence. Berman also believes that the artist's depiction of himself with a "thin, dissolving body" and "sallow skin" employs physical decay to challenge social and health norms.

== History ==
The painting was exhibited at Blomqvist's in Oslo during the autumn of 1895, along with Munch's other works including the 1893 version of The Scream, the 1894–1895 version of Madonna, and Vampire. The self-portrait was originally intended to be exhibited as "twin wedding portraits" with Munch's portrait of his supposed lover Dagny Juel. However, Juel's father asked Munch to take down his daughter's portrait before the exhibition, which Munch did. Self-Portrait with Cigarette was purchased that year by the National Gallery, now part of the National Museum of Norway.

The self-portrait's exhibition led to controversy surrounding Munch's mental health. Johan Scharffenberg, then a medical student, suggested the painting to be a manifestation of Munch's amorality and mental degeneration; Scharffenberg diagnosed the artist as a sick and corrupting influence on Norwegian youth. Berman identifies this and other criticism of the painting's potential danger towards society to be motivated by influential thinkers such as Max Nordau.

From 1908 to 1909, Munch produced a lithograph also titled Self-Portrait with Cigarette. He also made a photographic reproduction of the painting some time between 1907 and 1909.

From February to May 2006, the self-portrait and 86 other paintings by Munch were featured at the Museum of Modern Art in New York for the first 21st-century retrospective of Munch's career, titled Edvard Munch: The Modern Life of the Soul.

== See also ==
- List of paintings by Edvard Munch
- Tobacco and art
