= BBC East Midlands Today =

BBC television news programme for the East Midlands

- Title card used since April 2022
- Theme music composer: David Lowe
- Country of origin: United Kingdom
- Original language: English

Production
- Producers: BBC News; BBC East Midlands
- Production locations: London Road, Nottingham, NG2 4UU (1999–present) York House, Mansfield Road, Nottingham (1991–1999) Pebble Mill, Birmingham (1986–1988 - as sub-opt of Midlands Today)
- Camera setup: Multi-camera
- Running time: 30 minutes (main 18:30 programme); 10 minutes (13:30 and 22:30 programmes); Various (on weekends and Breakfast)

Original release
- Network: BBC One East Midlands
- Release: 7 January 1991 – present

Related
- Midlands Today (for the West Midlands); ITV News Central

BBC East Midlands Today is the BBC's regional television news programme for the East Midlands.

The programme is broadcast on BBC One from studios at the BBC's East Midlands broadcasting centre in Nottingham with district newsrooms based in Derby and Leicester. The main transmitter for the programme is Waltham near Melton Mowbray in Leicestershire.

The programme can be watched in any part of the UK (and Europe) from Astra 1N on Freesat channel 952 and Sky channel 960. The latest edition of BBC East Midlands Today is also available to watch on the BBC iPlayer.

== History ==
=== Background ===
The first BBC Home Service broadcasting site in Nottingham was from the third floor of the Bentinck Buildings in Wheelergate from 18 August 1950. The broadcasts went via the Nottingham telephone exchange to the BBC site in Birmingham on telephone trunk lines. The first live broadcast was on 2 December 1950 by George Liddell, of Nottingham Forest against Exeter. Both Nottingham and Leicester had around 8,000 television sets. Also earlier in 1950, Nottingham's Ken Adam had become Controller of the Light Programme (BBC Radio 2 from 1967).

One of the first live TV broadcasts from the area came on 7 June 1951 with cricket matches being sent to Sutton Coldfield, via a TV relay station on Bardon Hill in Leicestershire. A BBC national broadcasting site at nearby Lincoln opened on 8 March 1951.

The Director General of the BBC, Sir Ian Jacob first visited the new Nottingham site on 12 June 1953, having lunch with the Senate of University of Nottingham.

The controller of the BBC Midland region was John Dunkerley (10 October 1902 – 21 March 1985), who had been there since 1932, working with composer Victor Hely-Hutchinson; Dunkerley was replaced in August 1964 by Patrick Beech , of Malvern, the assistant head of the BBC West region. Beech was the grandson of Mrs Patrick Campbell, whose second husband had been, previously, the second husband (from 1900) of Winston Churchill's mother. In 1969, Beech became the Controller of English Regions. In 1970, the structure of BBC TV regions changed.

=== Earlier sites ===
The £17,000 Derby Road site was opened by the Lord Mayor of Nottingham on 1 October 1963. It had two sound studios. The studio on Derby Road was next to the catholic St Barnabas Cathedral. The site was directed by Gerald Nethercot, of Somerset. Nethercot had worked for Leicester City Council from 1938. He was Emergency Information Officer for Leicester during the war, and a 2nd Lt in the Home Guard. He joined the RAF in 1943 as a Flt Lt, working in reconnaissance of V-weapon sites in the Pas de Calais, joining the BBC Midland region in January 1947. He was the first official BBC East Midlands staff, being appointed in November 1950. There was a press report that he never let his own children watch any evening television, and his children could watch children's television only twice a week. His son Patrick, born in 1946, flatly denies this and remembers watching much television through the 1950s. The local BBC news programme was called 'Midlands Six-Ten'.

The building was designed by Bartlett & Gray, and built by Sweeney & Palmer Ltd of Beechdale Road; structural steelwork was done by Siddons of Redhill. The building was named after Robert Willson (bishop) who was responsible for the cathedral being there, and built by the Catholic diocese, costing £50,000. The BBC were on the second floor. There were plans for a new larger broadcasting centre in Birmingham, which opened in 1971. New colour television transmitters for Nottinghamshire and Northamptonshire were planned for 1966. By the end of 1966, it was hoped that two-thirds of the UK could receive BBC2.

On 13 December 1976, colour news first came from the Derby Road studio on Holden Street. It had been black and white since 1963. The East Midlands correspondent was Bruce Myles, of Ravenshead. The transmitter was on the top of Nottingham Technical College. Philip Tibenham and Chris Drake had worked at the early Derby Road site.

From 7 to 11 September 1981, Midlands Today was broadcast entirely from the Nottingham studio on Derby Road, next to the catholic Cathedral.

The first East Midlands short TV news bulletins began on 3 October 1983, with Graham Henshaw. Central News East began its news programmes around the same time, after a 21-month industrial dispute had finished. Later in 1987, Graham Henshaw became the editor of Look East, in Norwich.

From 3 October 1983, the East Midlands had half-hourly bulletins on Breakfast News. On 15 July 1985, the main East Midlands opt-out of Midlands Today started, with the presenters being the 26-year-old Julie Hall from Marple, who joined in October 1983 from Channel 4, and 38-year-old Brian Conway, of Radio Leicester, from Hathern. In October 1988, Conway married BBC Birmingham presenter Kay Alexander. Hall, with a degree in Industrial Relations, soon returned to Channel 4 to present the 'Union World' documentary series'

Tom Beesley, educated at Wyggeston Grammar School for Boys, the station manager from 1973 to 1979 of Radio Nottingham had been the Midland regional television manager since August 1982, and lived in Kinoulton, and knew the Nottingham area, being born in Leicester. It was 6 minutes, to become 10 minutes in six months, once technology allowed this. Introducing the new opt-out had cost £75,000. New editing facilities were built at a site on Derby Road, where staff increased from two to 18. 75% of the news for the opt-out came from local radio. Beesley, with another former BBC Midlands regional manager David Waine (regional head at Birmingham from June 1983 to September 1994, being replaced by Nigel Chapman), would also start the new regional Radio 106 in September 1997.

In 1992, Janet Mayo voiced the announcements on the London Underground Central Line; the 85 trains were built by BREL in Derby.

=== Establishment ===
There had been plans for a separate region from 1969, in the BBC report 'Broadcasting in the 70s'.

To prepare for the new region, a new studio was built on Mansfield Road, opened by Michael Checkland on 27 June 1989. The building was later demolished, around 2017.

BBC East Midlands Today was established as an independent programme on 7 January 1991, having previously been a part of Midlands Today, which now solely covers the West Midlands region.

The split arose from criticisms of Midlands Today as being too centric on West Midlands coverage, although a service of separate opt-out bulletins for the region had been provided during the 1980s.

On 5 February 1996, the show introduced a double-anchored presentation with Quentin Rayner and Kathy Rochford. The programme's newer (generic) 'look', in line with most other BBC regional TV news programmes, was introduced on 16 September 2002, with an update on 6 September 2004. The current titles and graphics were introduced in July 2019.

== Coverage area ==
Parts of the Government-defined East Midlands region receive different regional programmes rather than East Midlands Today.

North Nottinghamshire (Bassetlaw), northeast Derbyshire (Chesterfield), the eastern High Peak (Hope Valley) and northern area of the Derbyshire Dales (Tideswell and Hathersage) are covered by Look North broadcasting from Leeds.

The western area of the High Peak (Buxton, Glossop, New Mills and Chapel-en-le-Frith), in Derbyshire are covered by North West Tonight.

All of Northamptonshire is covered by Look East and some southwestern parts of the county covered by South Today.

In most of Lincolnshire, BBC regional news is supplied by Look North East Yorkshire and Lincolnshire, broadcast from Hull. East Midlands Today still covers South Kesteven. Some viewers (but not all) in Lincoln have their aerials point to the Waltham transmitter that broadcast East Midlands Today, however the city is mostly covered by Look North, with most of Lincoln's television signals being received from the Belmont transmitter.

Some areas that are well covered by East Midlands Today receive better television signals from other transmitters rather the Waltham transmitter on Freeview. Mansfield, Ashfield and Bolsover areas receive better television signals from either the Emley Moor or Belmont transmitters, Market Harborough get stronger signals from the Sandy Heath transmitter and most of North West Leicestershire and Swadlincote receive better signals from the Sutton Coldfield transmitter.

However, those areas are given East Midlands Today on Channel 101 through satellite television such as Freesat as default via the towns' postcodes.

== On air ==
- A 3-minute brief news update airs each weekday at around 06:27, 06:57, 07:27, 08:27, and 09:05 during BBC Breakfast.
- A 15-minute lunchtime bulletin airs each weekday, between 13:30 and 13:45, as part of the BBC News at One hour.
- A 30-minute main edition of East Midlands Today airs each weekday, from 18:30 to 19:00, following the BBC News at Six.
- A 10-minute late evening bulletin airs each weekday, between 22:30 and 22:40, following the BBC News at Ten.
- A 5-minute early-evening bulletin airs on Saturday, following the BBC Weekend News.
- A 5-minute early-evening bulletin airs on Sunday, following the BBC Weekend News.
- A 5-minute late evening bulletin, airs each Sunday, between 22:25 and 22:30, following the BBC News at Ten.

== Presenters ==
=== News ===
Person	Duties
Anne Davies	Wednesday lunchtime, Mondays – Thursdays main evening programme
Jodi Law	Monday – Wednesday BBC Breakfast / lunchtime, some late cover
Owen Shipton	Monday – Thursday BBC Breakfast / lunchtime, some late cover
Carolyn Moses	Tuesday – Friday BBC Breakfast / lunchtime, some late cover
Emma Snow	Tuesday – Friday BBC Breakfast / lunchtime, some late cover / weekend
Sophie Wheeldon	Monday – Friday BBC Breakfast / lunchtime, some late cover
Elise Chamberlain	Monday – Friday late programme
Mel Duffy	Main programme, late cover Sundays
Rob Rose	East Midlands Today Breakfast news / lunchtime & weekend cover
Simon Ward	East Midlands Today Breakfast news / lunchtime, lates & weekend

=== Main Weather Presenters ===
- Kaye Forster, Senior Weather Presenter (Lunchtime & Evenings: Mon & Tue)
- Anna Church, Senior Weather Presenter (Lunchtime & Evenings: Wed - Fri)
- Gillian Brown (Breakfast & lunchtime cover)

*Weekend forecasts vary

=== Former on air team ===
- Dominic Heale (ex-main presenter, 2001–2020)
- Lukwesa Burak (now with the BBC News channel & BBC World News)
- Jo Wheeler (freelance with Sky News)
- Des Coleman (now with ITV News Central)
- Martine Croxall (now with the BBC News channel & BBC World News)
- Shiulie Ghosh (now with Al Jazeera English in Doha)
- Kylie Pentelow (now with BBC News)
- Priya Kaur-Jones (now with France 24)
- John Hess (Political correspondent until retiring in 2015, briefly returned for coverage on the EU Referendum in 2016)
- Maurice Flynn (ex-weekend presenter 2009–2019)
- Ivan Gaskell (now with BBC Sport)
- Sarah Stirk (now with Sky Sports)
- Nina Warhurst (now BBC News at One Main Presenter as well as BBC Breakfast Relief Presenter)
