= Sarah Stirk =

British television presenter

- Born: Sarah Stirk; 47–48; United Kingdom
- Occupation: TV presenter
- Years active: 2007–present

Sarah Stirk is a British television presenter.

== Broadcasting career ==
Stirk began her broadcasting career on MUTV, the channel for prominent football team Manchester United. She has also presented on BBC's East Midlands Today.

She spent two years covering the PGA Golf Tour on the now defunct Setanta Golf. After Setanta's demise in 2009 she started presenting sports news for the BBC, appearing on the BBC News Channel in the UK and BBC World News, including Sports Today. She works as a presenter for Sky Sports Golf.

Stirk has also reported on the Open Championship on radio for Talksport and in 2010 was part of the team on Radio 5 Live's coverage of the PGA Championship and Scottish Open.

== Writing ==
Stirk contributes to several golfing publications, including Golf International and A Place in the Sun.

== Personal life ==
In 2021, Stirk came out as a lesbian. She has a son.
