= Ivan Gaskell =

British sports reporter

Ivan Gaskell is a Derby born sports reporter for the BBC. He was sports editor and presenter at BBC Radio Stoke between 1986 and 1992, he joined BBC Sport in 1997, after working on East Midlands Today for 10 years. He worked on World Cup coverage in 2002 and 2006, and is a regular reporter on Football Focus, Match of the Day and Final Score. Along with these duties, Gaskell also occasionally presents sports bulletins on the BBC News Channel

Gaskell attended Noel-Baker Community School.
