= Maurice Flynn (presenter) =

Irish journalist and presenter

- Born: Muirgheas Flynn; County Kilkenny, Ireland
- Occupation: Journalist

Maurice Flynn is an Irish journalist and presenter, best known for presenting BBC Points West and BBC East Midlands Today.

== Early life ==
He was born in Kilkenny, Ireland. He moved to England when he was 10.

== Career history ==
Maurice worked for Fox FM, Radio Oxford, ITV news and is best known for presenting for BBC News in the East Midlands and West regions of England.

He left the BBC in 2019.
