= Maurice Flynn (hurler) =

Irish hurler

Personal information
- Native name: Muiris Ó Floinn (Irish)
- Born: 24 March 1869 Kilfinane, County Limerick, Ireland
- Died: 25 July 1936 (aged 67) Kilfinane, County Limerick, Ireland
- Occupation: Farmer

Sport
- Sport: Hurling
- Position: Left wing-forward
Club
- Years: Club
- Kilfinane
Inter-county
- Years: County
- Limerick
Inter-county titles
- Munster titles: 1
- All-Irelands: 1

Maurice Flynn (24 March 1869 – 25 July 1936) was an Irish hurler who played as a left wing-forward for the Limerick senior team.

Born in Kilfinane, County Limerick, Flynn first played competitive hurling in his youth. He was a regular for the Limerick senior hurling team during a successful period at the end of the 19th century. During his inter-county career he won one All-Ireland medal and one Munster medal.

At club level Flood was a two-time championship medallist with Kilfinane.

== Honours ==
=== Player ===
Limerick

- All-Ireland Senior Hurling Championship (1): 1897
- Munster Senior Hurling Championship (1): 1897
