= March 1988 in the Troubles =

Uptick in violence during the Troubles

- Part of the Troubles
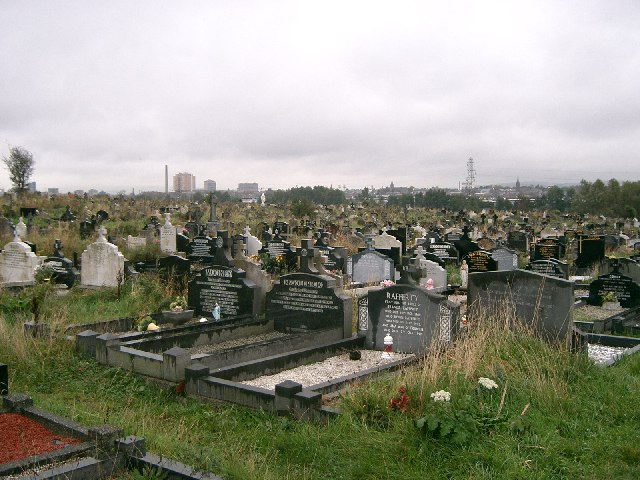
- Milltown Cemetery in Belfast; all three major events during this period were linked to it
Date	March 6 – March 19, 1988 (1 week and 6 days)
Location	Gibraltar and Northern Ireland
Result	Uptick in paramilitary violence in the conflict; Broadcast restrictions placed on various loyalist and republican groups; Increased calls for peace in Northern Ireland

Belligerents
British Armed Forces; Royal Gibraltar Police; Royal Ulster Constabulary	Provisional Irish Republican Army (PIRA); Irish nationalist civilians	Ulster Defence Association (UDA)

Units involved
British Army; Special Air Service (SAS)	Belfast Brigade; Various Active service unit (ASUs)	Ulster Freedom Fighters (UFF)

Casualties and losses
2 dead	8 dead; 60+ injured	0 casualties
- Total killed: 11; Total injured: 60+

March 1988 saw an uptick in violence in the Troubles, promulgated by a string of fatal events between British security forces and local paramilitary groups. Starting with a British military operation in Gibraltar on March 6, the ensuing chain reaction of incidents would last for fourteen days, ushering some of the worst violence of the conflict and nearly bringing Northern Ireland into civil war according to some. The attacks, which received extensive domestic and global coverage, helped ultimately initiate the Northern Ireland peace process.

The events began on March 6, when the British Special Air Service (SAS) shot dead three members of the Provisional Irish Republican Army (PIRA or IRA) in Gibraltar as part of Operation Flavius. As their bodies were flown back to Ireland to be buried, tensions between security forces, Protestants, and Catholics intensified. On March 14, a PIRA member attempting to attack a patrol in Belfast was shot dead by a British Army soldier, and the following day, a Catholic trade-unionist named Charles McGrillen was fatally shot by the Ulster Defence Association (UDA). At the funeral for the fallen IRA members at Milltown Cemetery in Belfast on March 16, attended by Sinn Féin leaders Gerry Adams and Martin McGuinness, a loyalist militant, Michael Stone, launched a gun and grenade attack, killing three and injuring over 60; after being chased and beaten by a mob, he was arrested by the Royal Ulster Constabulary (RUC). The attack, the first of the so-called Funeral Murders, informed Catholics present at the later March 19 funeral for one of Stone's victims, who believed that two British Army corporals who had driven towards their procession were loyalists attempting to instigate another attack; they were subsequentially dragged out of their car, abducted, and killed. Additionally, the day prior, a chemist named Gillian Johnston was killed by an IRA ambush intended for her brother, accused of being a Ulster Defence Regiment (UDR) member.

The succession of event generated extensive, international headlines; in particular the Funeral Murders had both been caught by news crews who distributed their pictures throughout the world, described as among the "most dramatic and harrowing" of the entire conflict. The incidents angered many in Great Britain and London, who faced increased political and public pressure to tackle the conflict in Northern Ireland. The IRA and Sinn Féin were also undermined by series of events, having already seen decreasing public support following another bombing in Enniskillen during a Remembrance Sunday ceremony in November 1987. In response to the events, as well as a fatal bombing of a British Army bus in Ballygawley later that year, the British government implemented a broadcasting ban on various loyalist and republican groups, including Sinn Féin. The brutality of the attacks helped foster growing sentiment amongst the public, as well as political and militant actors for peaceful dialogue, helping initiate the peace efforts of the 1990s that ended in the Good Friday Agreement of 1998.

== Background ==
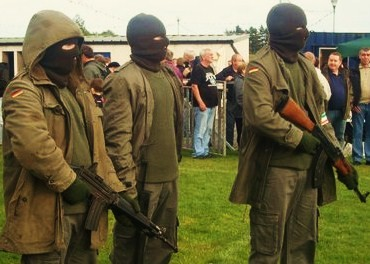
Provisional IRA re-enactors in 2009

Anglo presence in Ireland began in the 12th century, when the Kingdom of England, under the House of Anjou, invaded and subjugated large parts of Ireland. English control of Ireland fluctuated for the remainder of the Middle Ages, eventually being reduced to a pale around Dublin by the 15th century, however, renewed efforts by the Tudors in the 16th century resulted in the last Irish rulers being subjugated by 1603. To help maintain order, the English began anglicization efforts starting in the 14th century, culminating in the settling of British colonists in Ireland starting under the Tudors. Unlike Scotland and England, Ireland remained Catholic during the Protestant Reformation, resulting in longstanding sectarian violence between Irish Catholics and the descendants of the British, mostly concentrated in the adjacent province of Ulster. A wave of violence during the mid and late 17th centuries resulted in the Protestants dominating Irish socioeconomic and political life for the next two centuries, intensifying after Ireland was formally annexed by Britain in 1801. Irish nationalism grew rapidly in the 19th century, largely amongst Catholics who began embracing an independence-oriented movement known as republicanism; this culminated in Ireland seceding from the United Kingdom during an independence war following World War I. The treaty that ended the war separated six of the counties of Ulster into the Protestant Northern Ireland, which remained British.

The ruling Unionist establishment in Northern Ireland oppressed the Catholic minority, leading to sectarian clashes. During the independence war, the Irish republicans fought under the name of the Irish Republican Army (IRA); after the treaty, the IRA, who opposed the UK retention of Northern Ireland, as well as the continued link between Ireland and the UK outlined in the treaty, fought a civil war against Pro-Treaty forces that ended in defeat for them; afterwards, they became proscribed as a terrorist organization by the new Irish state. The IRA waged several campaigns in the 1930s, 1940s, 1950s, and 1960s, aiming to integrate Northern Ireland into a new Irish republican state. They also defended Catholic communities in the north. Sectarian violence mounted in the 1960s, with Ulster loyalist and Irish republican militias mobilizing, culminating in a riot in Derry in 1969 that prompted the intervention of the British Army and is widely regarded as the start of the Troubles, a nearly three decade era of sectarian unrest between Protestants and Catholics in Northern Ireland. The IRA split in response to the events in Derry, with the new Provisional IRA (PIRA) emerging as the preeminent organization; they fought and competed with various loyalist militias, namely the Ulster Defence Association (UDA) and Ulster Volunteer Force (UVF), as well as the Royal Ulster Constabulary (RUC), Northern Ireland's police service, and the British military, the latter two which were accused by Catholics of being partial to loyalists. The conflict, which would see widespread shootings, bombing attempts, the militarization of Northern Ireland, and attacks outside the region, would lead to over 3,000 deaths and nearly 50,000 injuries over its duration in the late 20th century.

After an initial insurgency phase early in the conflict, the PIRA took their campaign into a more indirect approach starting in the mid 1970s, in response to infiltration by British intelligence, successful counter-insurgency efforts, and withering public support. The PIRA prioritized smaller-scale, cellular organization, and became more selective in their attacks, targeting specific high-profile figures and sites. They also began a campaign outside Northern Ireland, targeting mainland Britain and British personnel and sites on Continental Europe, and attempted to drum up public support via actions such as the 1981 hunger strike and increasing prioritization of electoral politics via their associated party, Sinn Féin, led by Gerry Adams and Martin McGuinness, both accused by many of being on the PIRA Army Council. The PIRA continued launching attacks throughout the United Kingdom and Europe, with the 1980s seeing worsening violence, with both sides of the conflict launching major attacks. The PIRA attempted to assassinate British Prime Minister Margaret Thatcher in the 1984 Brighton hotel bombing, and continued attacks on loyalists and security forces; often prompting or in response to clashes from them in a continuing cycle of violence. All sides frequently held memorial services for their fallen, which often drew conflict with the other factions; the Republicans in particular accused security forces of excessive conduct at their funerals. In November 1987, a PIRA time bomb at a Remembrance Sunday procession in Enniskillen, meant to kill British soldiers in a possible response to the harassment of a republican memorial service by the RUC the week prior, detonated early, killing 11 civilians and an RUC officer, as well as injuring 63 others. The attack, which prompted an apology from the PIRA, greatly damaged the reputation of it and Sinn Féin, and outraged loyalists, who embarked on a campaign of revenge attacks on Catholics. The months leading up to March 1988 saw an uptick in violence, as loyalists and republicans continued to harass and kill one another.

== Attacks ==
=== Operation Flavius ===
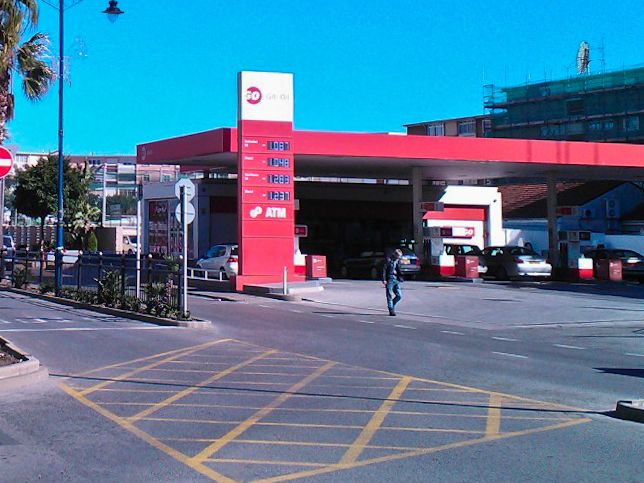
The gas station where PIRA members Daniel McCann and Mairéad Farrell were shot dead...

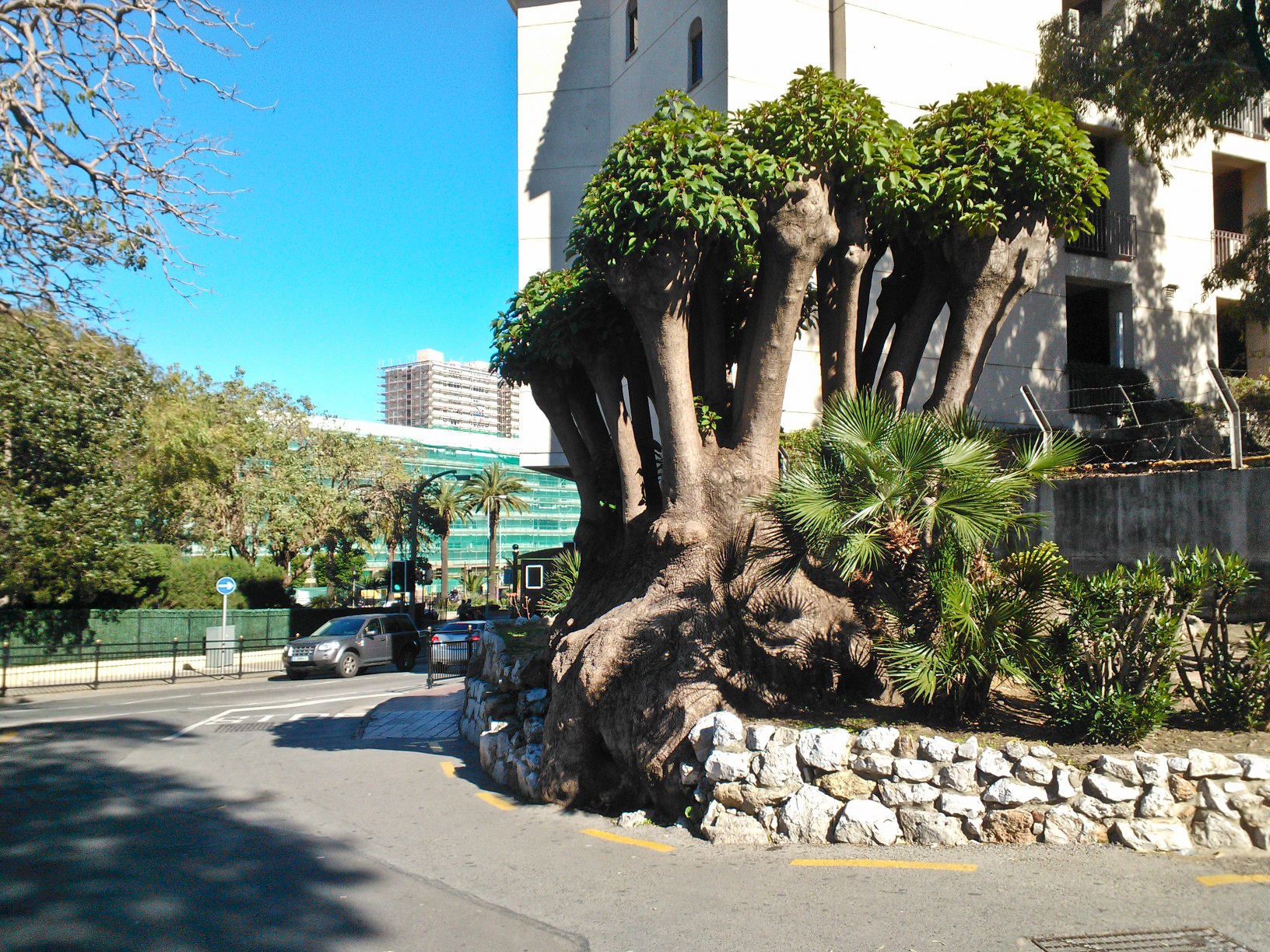
... and the location close by where PIRA member Seán Savage was shot dead.

Beginning in late 1987, British authorities began gaining intelligence on a possible Provisional IRA attack in the overseas territory of Gibraltar in Iberia. British and Spanish intelligence became aware of a PIRA active service unit operating in Andalusia's Costa del Sol. After a known PIRA member was spotted at two guard mounting ceremonies at the Convent, the official residence of Gibraltar's governor, in late 1987 and early 1988, British authorities began monitoring the activities of three PIRA members; Seán Savage, Daniel McCann, and Mairéad Farrell, all of whom had experience in explosives, with the latter two even serving prison time for related charges. The three traveled to the Andalusian town of Málaga in February, where they were extensively monitored by authorities; by March, British authorities believed that a PIRA attack was imminent. The Special Air Services (SAS), a special force unit under the British Army, under the approval of Prime Minister Margaret Thatcher, subsequently dispatched a team to the territory. The SAS planned to arrest the trio in collaboration with the Gibraltar Police.

The SAS took action on March 6. According to the official record, Savage entered Gibraltar undetected at 12:45 CET, and was traced by a MI5 agent who recognized him. Savage parked his white Renault 5 in the parking lot used for the guard mounting. Farrell and McCann were observed entering Gibraltar at 14:30 and subsequentially followed; the trio met at 14:50. A bomb disposal officer subsequentially investigated the car after they left, reporting to four SAS members that it should be treated as a potential car bomb. After Gibraltar Police formally transferred oversight of the operation to the SAS, they began an effort to intercept the trio as they trekked up Winston Churchill Avenue towards the Spanish border. The PIRA members subsequentially realized that they were being followed, and Savage split up from the group; they were all followed by SAS members. Arrangements began to be made for the three once in custody, and in response, a patrol unit was ordered to return to police headquarters. The unit was unaware of the ordeal, and was traveling north on Smith Dorrien Avenue, near the roundabout where it intersects with Winston Churchill; stuck in traffic, they activated their siren to enter the roundabout from the wrong side of the road and turn around. Farrell and McCann, who were just outside a gas station on Winston Churchill, were startled by the siren, just as they were about to be apprehended by two SAS officers. As one approached them, Farrell appeared to realize who they were, and according to officer testimony, both her and McCann's moved in a way that made the officer believe they were reaching for detonators, prompting him to shoot them in the back with his pistol, before shooting McCann a further three times in the body and head, followed by the other officer who opened fire on the two in response. As gunfire rang out, Savage, who was 300 feet (91 m) south of the gas station, turned around, prompting the two soldiers trailing him to open fire on him; according to testimony, they also believed he had a remote detonator. All three PIRA members died.

Oversight was subsequentially returned to Gibraltar Police, who began immediately arriving at the scene. The area around the Convent was evacuated afterwards, and four hours later, authorities proclaimed that a bomb had been diffused. Anglo-Spanish authorities later tracked, via car keys found on Farrell, a red Ford Fiesta in Marbella, Andalusia, where a large cache of Semtex and ammunition, in addition to timers and detonators, were discovered. The UK Ministry of Defense (MoD) disclosed the engagement, known as Operation Flavius, within minutes of the killings. The PIRA later confirmed the following day that the trio were on active service in Gibraltar. Initial reports illustrated the trio as being armed and with bombs, though as it later became apparent that this was false, suspicions around the legality of the killings arose.

On April 28, the ITV London regional station Thames broadcast the documentary "Death on the Rock". The This Week documentary claimed that the PIRA members had been shot without warning or hands up. It was condemned by the UK government and savaged by the British press, becoming the first documentary to be subject to independent inquiry, one headed by Conservative politician Lord Windlesham and libel lawyer Richard Rampton. The Windlesham–Rampton Report, prompted after one of the witnesses in the documentary retracted his statements in the official Gibraltar inquest, largely vindicated the documentary and its findings. The families of the trio took the case to the European Commission of Human Rights in 1990, on the grounds that Operation Flavius violated Article 2 of the European Convention on Human Rights (ECHR). The commission ruled in 1993 that although the conduct of the SAS was regrettable, it did not violate Article 2; nevertheless, it referred the case to the European Court of Human Rights, which ruled in 1995 that it did. Although the court denied the families' damages and inquest costs claims due to the trio being killed in a terrorist operation, they did mandate that the UK government pay their applicants fees, which, after initial suggestions of not doing so and withdrawing from the ECHR, they did begrudgingly. The governor of Gibraltar, Peter Terry, celebrated the engagement; in a probable revenge attack, the PIRA wounded him and his wife at a shooting in their home at Staffordshire, England, in 1990 following the end of his governorship the year prior.

=== Reaction ===
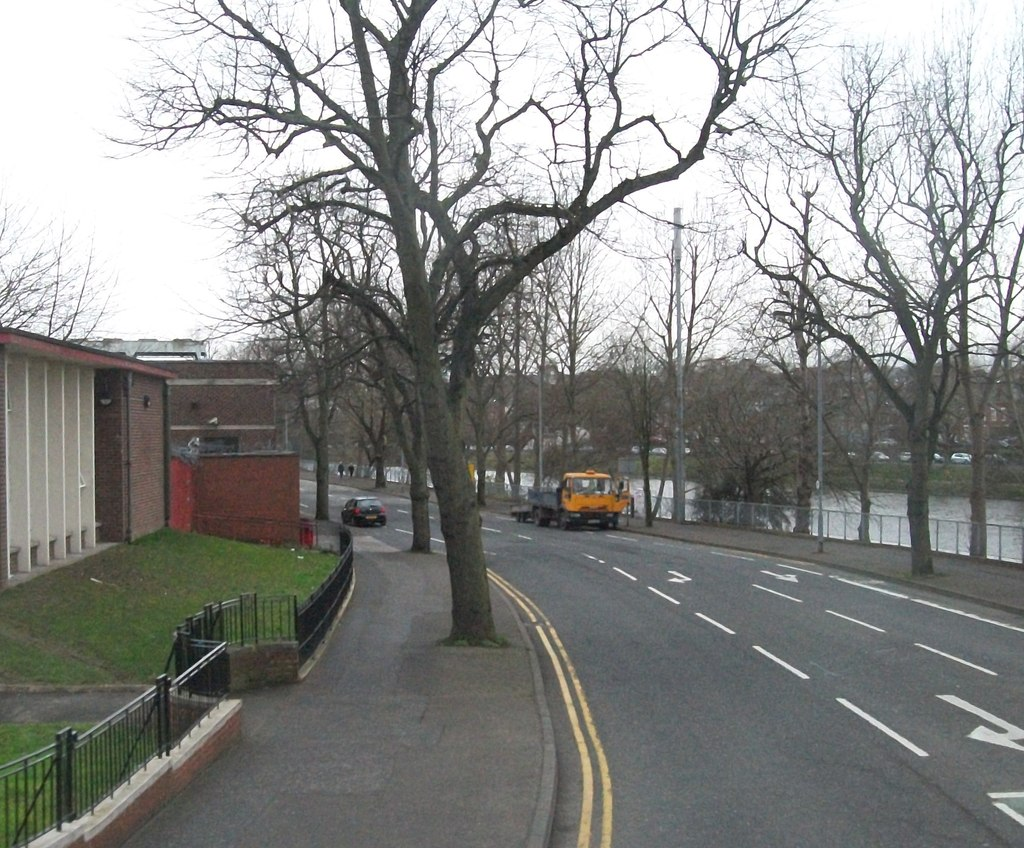
The Annadale Embankment in Belfast, where the Catholic trade unionist Charles McGrillen would be killed by a loyalist gunman on March 15

The PIRA informed the families of the trio the evening of their deaths, before confirming their membership the following day. Sinn Féin member Joe Austin was tasked with bringing their bodies back to Ireland. Traveling to Gibraltar on March 9 with Terrance Farrell, the brother of Mairéad, Austin arranged a chartered flight of their bodies back to Ireland. Although the Taoiseach of the Republic of Ireland, Charles Haughey, privately attempted to get the Royal Air Force (RAF) to fly their bodies directly to Belfast in Northern Ireland, Allen's plan went on as intended, with their bodies being flown to Dublin in the Republic on March 14.

Tensions had already been brewing between Catholics, loyalists, and security forces in Northern Ireland in the wake of Operation Flavius. The coffins of the three PIRA members were greeted by around two thousand people in the city, before being driven up north. At the border, Northern Irish officials greeted the procession with a large number of UK military and RUC vehicles and men; they insisted on the hearses carrying the three to be let in separately at intervals, causing clashes with the procession and charges that the RUC rammed Savage's hearse. Eventually, the hearses were allowed to travel individually to their families' homes. UK troops and RUC officers amassed in the streets of Northern Ireland in an attempt to minimize outpouring of sympathy.

That night, a PIRA member, Kevin McCracken, a former inmate at the H-Blocks, was fatally shot by British patrols in Turf Lodge, located in western Belfast, as he prepared to attack them. Republicans claim that he was about to attack troops surrounding the Savage family home and harassing visitors. The following day, on March 15, Charles McGrillen, a Catholic trade-unionist who had attempted to bridge divides between the two sides, arrived for work at the Annadale Embankment in southern Belfast. There, early in the morning, he was approached by a gunman from the Ulster Freedom Fighters (UFF), the UDA's paramilitary wing, who opened fire, killing him; the gunman fled via motorcycle. Continued reports of RUC harassment of the republican funeral processions fueled further anger amongst Catholics. McCracken's death brought the total number of PIRA members killed to six in the two weeks prior; the day before Operation Flavius saw volunteers Brendan Burns and Brendan Moley be laid to rest after dying in a premature explosion. The three were planned to be collectively buried on March 16; the killings and clashes since had led to an exorbitantly high degree of tension throughout Northern Ireland on that day.

=== Milltown Cemetery attack ===
Brief excerpt of an ITN report on the incident.

In response to repeated criticism from republicans, which had once again reared its head with the clashes with security forces the days prior, that the RUC and British military practiced overly heavy-handed policing at their funerals, the RUC agreed to be absent from the funeral of the "Gibraltar three", in exchange for the absence of the republican three-volley salute, an illegal act that had provoked previous interventions by the security forces. This publicly undisclosed decision resulted in the RUC only watching from the sidelines.

The joint funeral of Savage, Farrell, and McCann started with a requiem at the St Agnes’s Church in Andersonstown, a suburb of Belfast. Thousands of Republican sympathizers were present at the service, including the President of Sinn Féin, Gerry Adams, and senior party leader Martin McGuinness. Unbeknownst to them, a loyalist militant named Michael Stone had infiltrated the service. Stone was a member of the UFF, though he described himself as a "freelance loyalist paramilitary". He had become aware of the lax security at the funeral and aimed to assassinate Adams, McGuinness, as revenge for the earlier Remembrance Day bombing in 1987. Given approval by senior UDA leadership, he and other members initially planned to plant bombs at the funerals, but ruled it out as they might have not killed the Sinn Féin-IRA leadership. Stone was present at the requiem, getting close to Adams and McGuinness, but then ruled out killing them right there, stating later that he thought doing so in the middle of the service would be excessively barbaric. After requiem finished, the procession then made its way to the Milltown Cemetery, where the fallen IRA trio were to be buried in the cemetery's republican plot. Stone entered the cemetery with mourners, as RUC and news helicopters soared ahead. He was unable to get close to Adams and McGuinness. The coffins then began to be lowered; as the third was, Stone tossed two RGD-5 grenades towards the republican plot. The grenades exploded, causing panic and the crowd to take cover; Stone then opened fire with a pistol, before jogging towards the M1 motorway. He was pursued by dozens in the crowd, who were met with gunfire and grenades from Stone; despite this, they continued pursuing him. Stone arrived at the M1, where a UDA getaway vehicle had driven off as its driver panicked, causing Stone to attempt to stop cars on the highway to get a ride; he was subsequentially tackled by his pursuers, beaten, and bundled into a hijacked vehicle, before being saved by armed RUC officers who arrested him. A separate RUC van that had been parked on the M1 and sped off shortly after the attacks was attributed by the agency to officers who feared for their lives.

=== Reaction ===
Riot in Belfast in the aftermath of the attack

The Milltown Cemetery attack killed three people and injured over sixty. Caught by news cameras from overhead helicopters and on the ground, the attack was broadcast globally, prompting widespread international attention and shock. The UDA and UVF promptly denied responsibility. Despite the fact that Stone was a UFF and had received endorsement for his attacks, the UDA's West Belfast Brigade leader, Tommy Lyttle, without condemning the attacks, described Stone as a rogue militant, and two UDA members telegraphed the IRA to inform them that they had no knowledge of him. Many, including Sinn Féin, have alleged collusion between Stone and security forces, due to his knowledge of the fact that they were not to be present at the service. Stone himself alleged that he had received his weaponry the day before from a cache outside Belfast owned by Ulster Resistance, the paramilitary wing of the Democratic Unionist Party, which is the main unionist party in Northern Ireland; he claims that he was driven back into the city by an RUC member. Journalist Martin Dillon alleged that he received his weaponry from UDA member Brian Nelson, an undercover British agent. Stone was convicted in 1989, becoming a loyalist icon; he was sentenced to life, but freed in 1998 under the terms of the Good Friday Agreement (GFA), before being imprisoned in 2006 again for attempting once more to take out McGuinness and Adams, being paroled in 2021. The weapons used by Stone were used by the PIRA in several latter attacks, including an attack on a joint Army-RUC patrol in 1990, in which a constable died, and a August 2, 1988 killing of a lance-corporal of the Ulster Defence Regiment (UDR), a British Army regiment in Northern Ireland, was killed by the PIRA using one of the guns taken from the corporals.

Unrest erupted immediately following the attack, with Catholic youths burning vehicles and attacking security forces that night. Adams and local Catholic clergy made pleas for calm as violence and unrest intensified in Northern Ireland. The PIRA remained active during this period; on March 18, an ASU, possibly the one responsible for the Remembrance Day bombing, killed Gillian Johnston and her fiancé in a shooting. The PIRA were aiming for her brother, who they claimed was a UDA member; they subsequentially issued an apology. Later, they admitted that they were mistake about her brother as well. Public revulsion prompted the eventual disbandment of the ASU.

The funeral of one of the fallen, Caoimhín Mac Brádaigh, was set to take place on March 19. In the wake of the Cemetery attack, Northern Irish Catholics became increasingly vigilant and weary, fearing for another round of loyalist attacks. The atmosphere within Northern Ireland remained palpably tense as a result.

=== Andersonstown Road killings ===
Brief excerpt from a BBC News report over the lynching

On March 19, Mac Brádaigh's funeral was making its way along the Andersonstown Road, heading towards Milltown Cemetery. The British Army had issued general orders to avoid the procession; despite this, as it moved along the road, a silver Volkswagen Passat B2 hatchback drove in front of it. In it contained British Army corporals Derek Wood and David Howes, aged 24 and 23 respectively. Wood had served in Northern Ireland for four years and was about to finish his tour; Howes had arrived in Northern Ireland just the week prior. It is believed that the two off-duty corporals had accidentally driven up to the procession. The two drove up to the procession, which was headed by several hackneys. A Sinn Féin steward attempted to direct them away. Funeralgoers starting believing that there were being subjected to another loyalist attack. The car then mounted a pavement and turned into a small road, scattering mourners. The road was blocked, causing the car to speedily reverse. Wood, the driver, attempted to leave the procession, but the way out was blocked by a hackney. Funeralgoers then set upon the car, smashing it in an attempt to drag the soldiers out. Wood withdrew a pistol in response, scattering the crowd at its sight and again when he fired from it. In both cases, they surged back, resuming their attempt to break in. Eventually, they succeeded.

The incident was caught by media, who were forced by the mob to stop. A hackney was later seen leaving the area as the men were taken to the Casement Park stadium. The abducted corporals were stripped to their socks and underwear, tortured, and searched, where it was revealed that they were British soldiers. A military ID on Howes was found, which read Herford, the site of a UK military base in West Germany, but their captors interpreted it as Hereford, the location of the SAS headquarters. They were then promptly taken to a waste ground and shot to death. The Catholic priest Alec Reid attempted to save the men's life, pleading for people to call an ambulance before they were taken away and shot, but was warned by one of the captors; later, having heard the shots, he rushed to the waste ground and attempted to give one of them mouth-to-mouth resuscitation, believing they were still alive. Upon realizing they were both deceased, he administered them their last rites. Although the PIRA was confiscating the media's pictures and films, photojournalist David Cairns was able to flee quickly enough and capture a photo of Reid administering the last rites to the naked body of Wood, creating one of the most iconic images of the Troubles.

The British Army captured the event from an overhead helicopter. However, fear of being ambushed by the PIRA resulted in them being instructed to not intervene, in addition to the RUC. The funeral procession then resumed as intended. The PIRA then later issued a statement acknowledging that they had executed two "SAS" members. PIRA volunteers and former Maze Prison inmates Alex Murphy and Harry Maguire were imprisoned for life over the murders in 1989, being released in 1998 under the GFA. Several others would be convicted for their role in the events of that day in the following years.

== Aftermath ==
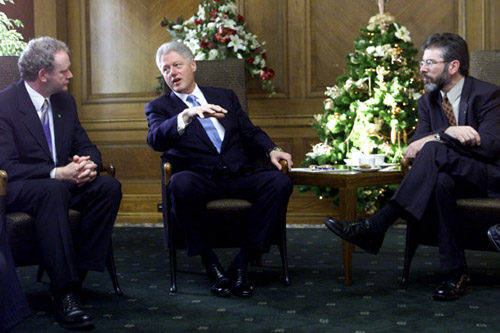
Martin McGuinness and Gerry Adams with US President Bill Clinton, who helped broker the GFA in 1998, at Stormont in 2000. The events are often seen as a landmark in the leadup to the Northern Ireland peace process.

The fourteen days of bloodshed and unrest were extensively covered worldwide. They were described as among the most tense and harrowing moments in the Troubles. Although waves of revenge killings and unrest were not uncommon in late-20th century Northern Ireland, the scale and rapid succession of the events of March 1988 were unprecedented, and was compared to the violent unrest gripping Apartheid South Africa at the same time. The level of violence brought forth concerns of Northern Ireland falling into a new level of violence, perhaps even causing a descent into a full-fledged civil war. Media covered the events in great detail, with memories of the fortnight of bloodshed becoming ensnared in the memories of many Brits living at the time. Journalists covering the events themselves were often traumatized by the incidents, and were subject to frequent threats from paramilitaries, as well as the government; the loss of the Thames franchise in 1991 following the 1990 Broadcasting Act was often blamed on the government who were said to be unhappy over "Death on the Rock".

The Funeral Murders, a term used as early as 1993 by The Independent, and popularized by the BBC in 2018, drew particular shock and outrage, with the killing of the two corporals, broadcast extensively into the homes of Brits, becoming an iconic and harrowing moment of the whole conflict. The attacks were generally condemned by the political establishments of both the United Kingdom and Republic of Ireland as savage occurrences as calls for dialogue and peace increased. The Labour Party, Fine Gael, and Fianna Fáil leaders Dick Spring, Alan Dukes, Charles Haughey (the Taoiseach) respectively all condemned the violence. In Britain, reactions were similar amongst the population and London, which faced renewed calls to tackle the escalating crisis in Northern Ireland. Prime Minister Margaret Thatcher denounced the violence, while debate intensified in Westminster over the solution. The "hands off" policy came under scrutiny, though its defenders argued that it was preferable to clashing with Catholics and prompting republicans to state "they won't even let us bury our dead in peace".

In Parliament, many MPs expressed great outrage. A conversation with an Irish embassy official in the aftermath detailed that many were demanding a timetable for a British withdrawal from Northern Ireland, so as "to let the Irish get on with butchering each other". Thatcher herself opposed this, claiming that a united Ireland would lead to "the worst civil war in history". Popular reaction in Britain saw the public demanding their MPs take greater action, with some MPs calling for an expansion of the internment policy. The wave of unrest, compounded with the prior Remembrance Day bombing and a fatal bombing of a bus carrying British troops later that year in Ballygawley, County Tyrone, led to the then Home Secretary, Douglas Hurd, announcing a ban on the broadcasting of the voices of members of Sinn Féin and ten other nationalist and loyalist groups in an attempt to stop them from practicing apologia of paramilitaries and their campaigns, similar to restrictions implemented by the Republic's all-island RTÉ national broadcaster from the 1970s onward.

Amongst republicans and unionists, reactions were more mixed. Danny Morrison, who was Sinn Féin's publicity director, informed his contact in the Republic's government that the PIRA funeral incidents has been a "godsend" for Gerry Adams's re-election efforts, (Note: Adams was officially an MP for Belfast West, though, in line with Sinn Féin tradition, he refused to take his seat) and that Sinn Féin was happy to see confrontations with the RUC continue. Unionists were outraged over the lynching of the corporals, and the remainder of the year saw a continued escalation of paramilitary violence, including the aforementioned bus bombing that prompted the British Army to begin ferrying its troops throughout County Tyrone via helicopter. Still, amongst ordinary people, the rapid succession of blood flow and tension prompted growing calls for peace, especially amongst Northern Irish youth, who by then had entirely grown up in a Northern Ireland wrapped up in the Troubles. Writing for the Scottish newspaper The Herald during the 35th anniversary of the events in 2023, Northern Irish journalist Neil Mackay wrote "Those 14 days shaped every single kid in Northern Ireland. We’d become the 'Peace Generation': young people demanding an end to the rule of the monsters; who would march for peace, [and] turn our lives towards peace..." The wave of violence was a watershed moment for the Troubles, undermining paramilitary support in the long run and paving the way for the Northern Ireland peace process of the 1990s that culminated in the Good Friday Agreement that largely ended the Troubles in 1998, after several years of ceasefires from republican and loyalist militias.

The events of the March 1988 fortnight have been featured in media relating to the Troubles. In 2013, a documentary dubbed 14 Days premiered on BBC One, documenting the events through the lenses of Alec Reid, who, in part due to the events, would go on to play an important role in the peace process, and would die shortly after the documentary's release. In 2018, a documentary premiered on BBC Two, which documented the Funeral Murders; the documentary (literally named The Funeral Murders) popularized the term.
