= Carmen Proetta =

Carmen Proetta (born 24 September 1947 in London) is a Gibraltarian who was an independent witness to Operation Flavius, a controversial British Army operation in which the Special Air Service shot dead three unarmed Provisional IRA members in Gibraltar on 6 March 1988. She became the subject of a number of articles by several British newspapers, which later paid her substantial damages in an out-of-court settlement.

Proetta had given a statement to the police, saying that she was washing dishes when she looked out of her kitchen window and witnessed the killings. According to her account, two of the three West Belfast suspects, Mairead Farrell and Dan McCann, had their hands in the air when they were shot without warning.

Her claims were made public a month later in an interview for the Thames Television documentary Death on the Rock.

In her interview she said "They [security forces] didn't do anything... they just went and shot these people. That's all. They didn't say anything, they didn't scream, they didn't shout, they didn't do anything. These people were turning their heads back to see what was happening and when they saw these men had guns in their hands they put their hands up. It looked like the man was protecting the girl because he stood in front of her, but there was no chance. I mean they went to the floor immediately, they dropped."

After the programme was broadcast, several British newspapers, including The Sun and The Sunday Times ran stories about her background. The Sun ran a headline labelling her 'The tart of Gib'. Its front-page story accused her of being a former prostitute, of running an escort agency and of being 'anti-British'. The Sunday Times interviewed the same witnesses after the broadcast. A Sunday Times journalist involved, Rosie Waterhouse, resigned not long afterwards. In a letter to the Press Gazette published in January 1989, Waterhouse wrote that her copy had been altered with the effect of discrediting Proetta's evidence.

All of the accusations were later shown to be false. Proetta launched a libel action case against five of the newspapers and was subsequently awarded an estimated £300,000 damages in an out-of-court settlement.

== See also ==
- Operation Flavius
- Death on the Rock; a controversial documentary about the shootings.
