= Milltown Cemetery attack =

1988 terrorist attack in Northern Ireland

- Part of March 1988 in the Troubles
- The funerals, minutes before the attack
- Location: 54°35′0″N 5°58′38″W; Milltown Cemetery, Belfast, Northern Ireland
- Date: 16 March 1988
- Weapons: RGD-5 hand grenades; Browning Hi-Power 9mm semi-automatic pistol; Ruger Speed-Six .357 Magnum revolver
- Deaths: 3
- Injuries: 60+
- Perpetrator: Michael Stone

On 16 March 1988, Michael Stone, an Ulster loyalist, attacked the funeral of three Provisional IRA members, killed in Operation Flavius, at Milltown Cemetery in Belfast, Northern Ireland with hand grenades and pistols. He had learned there would be no police or armed IRA members at the cemetery. As Stone then ran towards the nearby motorway, a large crowd chased him and he continued shooting and throwing grenades. Some of the crowd caught Stone and beat him, but he was rescued by the police and arrested. Three people were killed and more than 60 wounded.

The "unprecedented, one-man attack" was filmed by television news crews and caused shock around the world. Three days later, two British Army corporals drove into the funeral procession of one of the Milltown victims. The non-uniformed soldiers were dragged from their car by an angry crowd, beaten and then shot dead by the IRA.

== Background ==
On 6 March 1988, Provisional Irish Republican Army (IRA) members Daniel McCann, Seán Savage and Mairéad Farrell were shot dead by the Special Air Service (SAS) in Gibraltar, in Operation Flavius. The three had allegedly been preparing a bomb attack on British military personnel there, but the deaths outraged Irish republicans as the three were unarmed and purportedly shot without warning. Their bodies arrived in Belfast on 14 March and were taken to their family homes. Tensions were high as British security forces increased their presence in the neighbourhoods where they had lived, to try to prevent public displays honouring the trio. The "Gibraltar Three" were due to be buried in the republican plot at Milltown Cemetery on 16 March. For years, republicans had complained about the heavy-handed policing of IRA funerals, which had frequently led to outbreaks of violence. In a change from normal procedure, the Royal Ulster Constabulary (RUC) agreed to stay away from the funeral in exchange for guarantees that there would be no three-volley salute by IRA gunmen. The security forces would instead keep watch from the sidelines. This decision was not made public.

Michael Stone was an Ulster loyalist and a member of the paramilitary Ulster Defence Association (UDA) who had been involved in several killings and other attacks, and who described himself as a "freelance loyalist paramilitary". Stone learned that there would be minimal security force presence at the funerals, and planned "to take out the Sinn Féin and IRA leadership at the graveside". He said his attack was retaliation for the Remembrance Day bombing four months earlier when eleven Protestants had been killed by an IRA bomb at a Remembrance Sunday ceremony in Enniskillen. He later told journalist Peter Taylor that "it was symbolic: the IRA had attacked a British cenotaph and he was taking revenge by attacking the IRA equivalent". Stone claimed that he and other UDA members considered planting bombs in the graveyard, but abandoned the plan because the bombs might miss the republican leaders. He instead decided to carry out a one-man attack with guns and grenades. Stone claimed that a "senior member of the UDA" had given him the organisation's official clearance for the attack and that he was given a Browning Hi-Power pistol, a Ruger Speed-Six revolver and seven RGD-5 grenades the night before the funeral. Stone then created a "kangaroo pouch" to hold the grenades by cutting the leg off a pair of jeans and running rope up it before sewing the narrow bottom closed. The pouch would then be slung over his chest and have the grenades with the shortest fuses placed in first.

== Attack ==
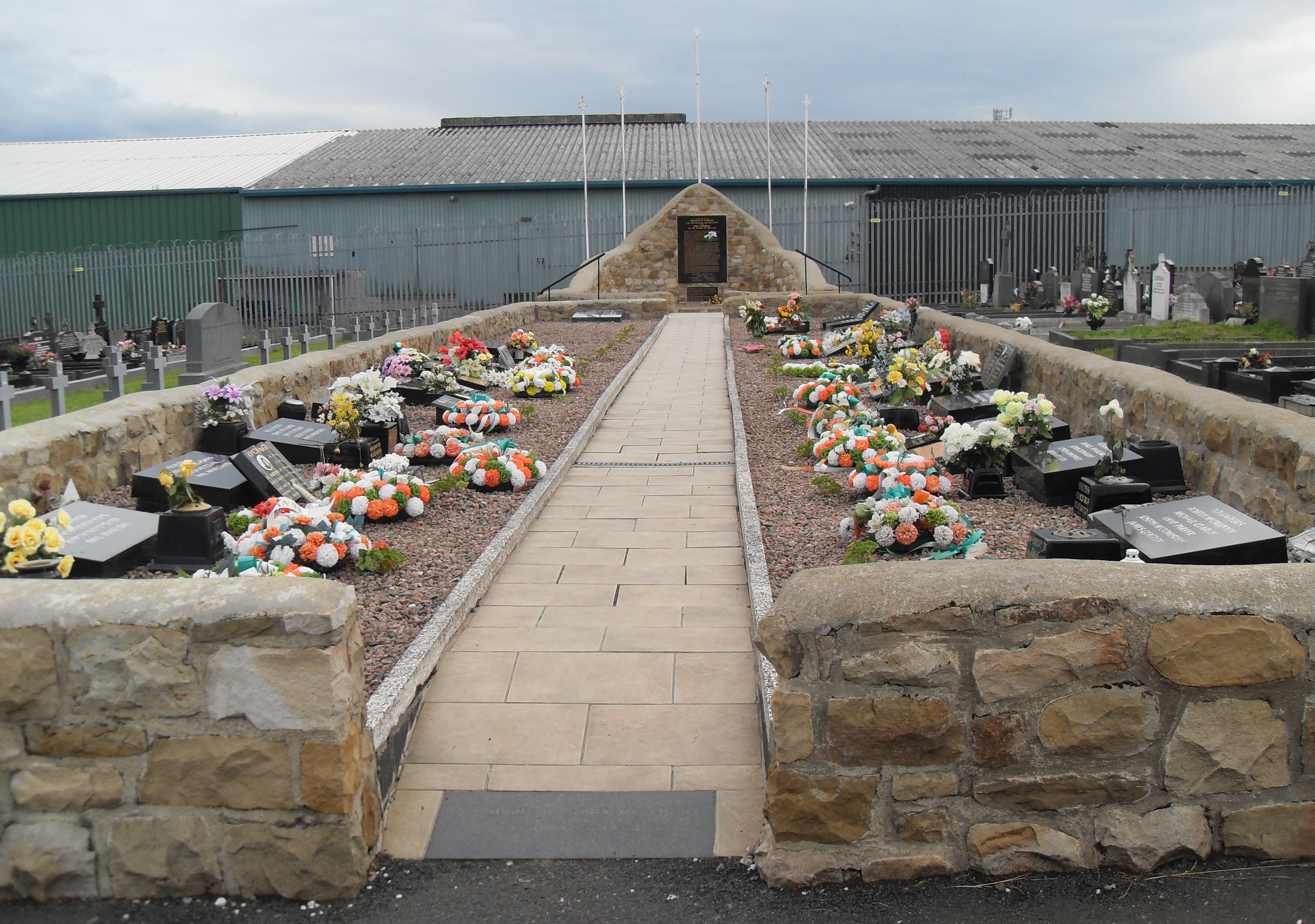
The republican plot at Milltown Cemetery, Michael Stone's target

The joint funerals of the three fallen IRA members took place at St Agnes’s Church in Andersonstown. Present at this requiem mass were thousands of mourners and top members of the IRA and Sinn Féin, including Sinn Féin leader Gerry Adams and Martin McGuinness. Stone had infiltrated the church and got close to Adams and McGuinness, but decided that killing them during the funeral service itself would be "too barbaric". Afterwards, the funeral cortege made its way to Milltown Cemetery, located off the Falls Road, as two RUC helicopters hovered overhead. Stone claimed that he entered the graveyard through the front gate with the mourners and mingled with the large crowd, although one witness claimed to have seen him enter from the M1 motorway with three other people.

As the third coffin was about to be lowered into the ground, Stone threw two RGD-5 grenades, which had a seven-second delay, toward the republican plot. After they detonated and the crowd instinctively took cover, he then opened fire with a Browning Hi-Power pistol. The first grenade exploded near the crowd and about 20 yards (18 m) from the grave. There was panic and confusion; people took cover behind gravestones. Stone began jogging toward the motorway, several hundred yards away, chased by dozens of men and youths. He periodically stopped to shoot and throw grenades at his pursuers, and when his 9mm semi-automatic pistol jammed he switched to a Ruger Security-Six revolver. In the 19 March edition of the Irish Times, columnist Kevin Myers, an opponent of republican paramilitary violence, wrote: "Unarmed young men charged against the man hurling grenades and firing an automatic pistol ... The young men stalking their quarry repeatedly came under fire; they were repeatedly bombed; they repeatedly advanced. Indeed this was not simply bravery; this was a heroism which in other circumstances, I have no doubt, would have won the highest military decorations".

Three people were killed while pursuing Stone, Catholic civilians Thomas McErlean (20) and John Murray (26) and IRA member Caoimhín Mac Brádaigh (30), also known as Kevin Brady. During the attack, about 60 people were wounded by bullets, grenade shrapnel and fragments of marble and stone from gravestones. Among those wounded was a pregnant mother of four, a 72-year-old grandmother, and a ten-year-old boy. Some fellow loyalists said that Stone made the mistake of throwing his grenades too soon; the death toll would likely have been much higher had the grenades exploded in mid-air, "raining lethal shrapnel over a wide area".

A white van that had been parked on the hard shoulder of the motorway was suddenly driven off as Stone fled from the angry crowd. There was speculation that the van was part of the attack, but the RUC said it was part of a police patrol, and that the officers sped off because they feared for their lives. Stone said he had arranged for a getaway car, driven by a UDA member, to pick him up on the hard shoulder of the motorway, but the driver allegedly "panicked and left". By the time Stone reached the motorway, he had seemingly run out of ammunition. He ran out onto the road and tried to stop cars, but was caught by the crowd, beaten, and bundled into a hijacked vehicle. Armed RUC officers in Land Rovers quickly arrived, "almost certainly saving his life". They arrested him and took him to Musgrave Park Hospital for treatment of his injuries. The whole event was recorded by television news cameras.

1 Republican Plot
2 First and second grenades
3 Third grenade
4 Fourth grenade
5 Fifth grenade
6 Sixth grenade
7 Stone captured

== Aftermath ==
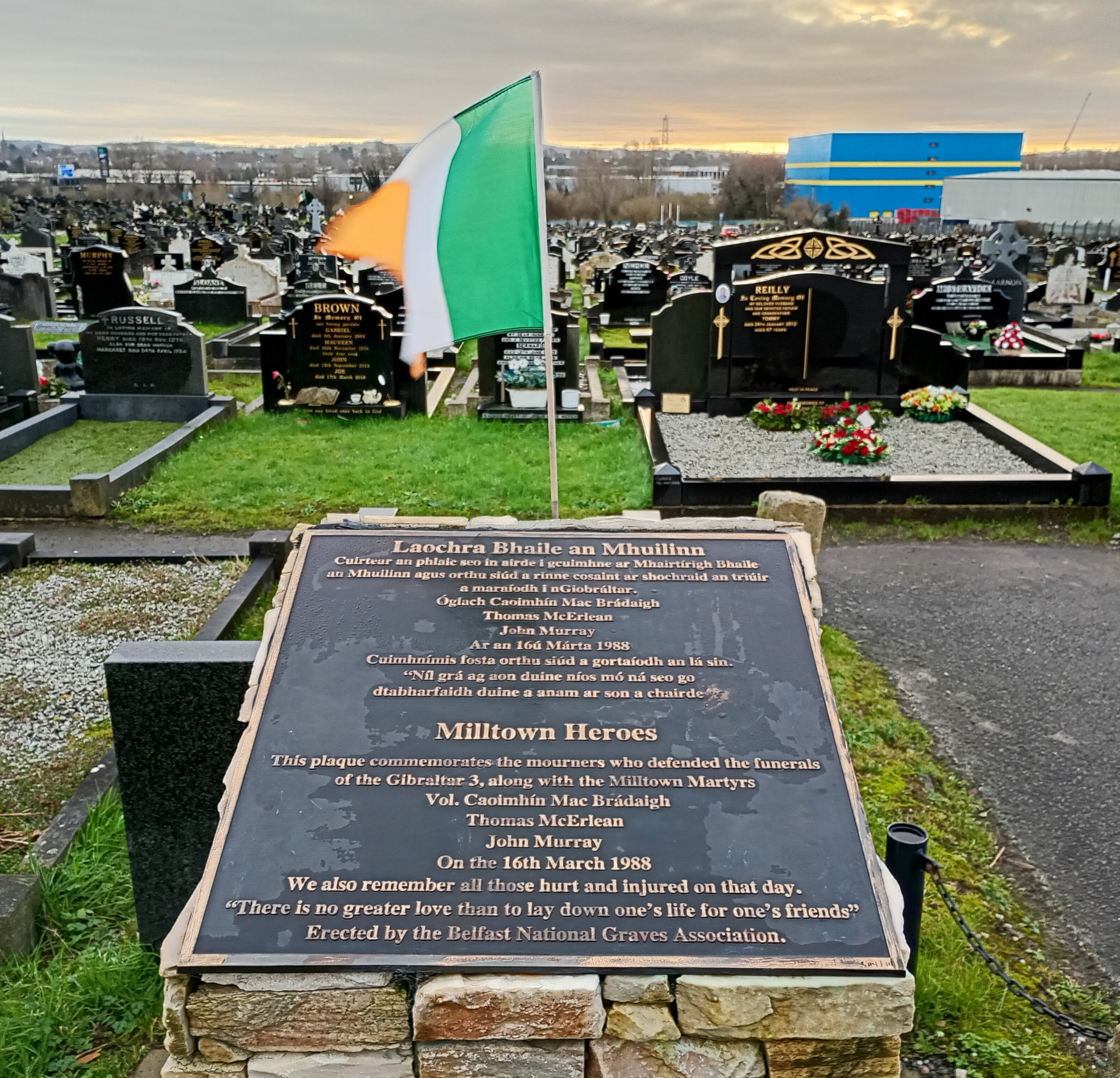
Memorial to the victims of the attack in Milltown Cemetery, Belfast

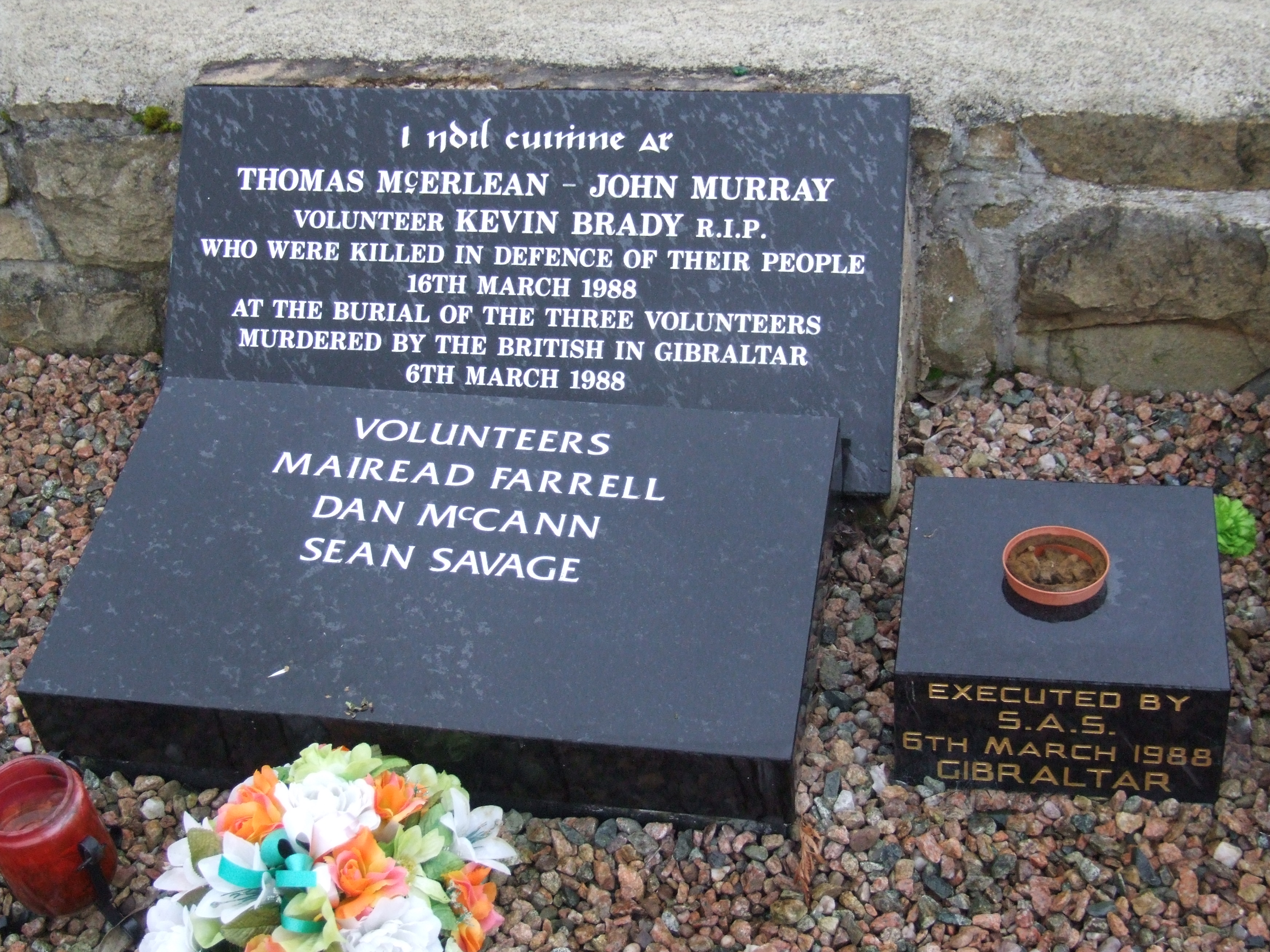
Memorial to Mairéad Farrell, Daniel McCann, Seán Savage and the victims of the attack in Milltown Cemetery, Belfast

That evening, angry youths in republican districts burnt hijacked vehicles and attacked the RUC. Immediately after the attack, the two main loyalist paramilitary groups—the UDA and the Ulster Volunteer Force (UVF)—denied responsibility. The leader of the UDA West Belfast Brigade, Tommy Lyttle, said that Stone was a rogue loyalist acting without orders from the UDA, although he did not condemn the attack. Lyttle told other UDA leaders to keep to this line. UDA member Sammy Duddy said: "After Milltown, two UDA brigadiers from two Belfast battalions telephoned the IRA to say they didn't know Michael Stone ... But Michael was UDA, he was a travelling gunman who went after the IRA and Republicans and he needed no authority for that because that was his job. Those two brigadiers were scared in case the IRA would retaliate against them or their areas ... so they disclaimed Michael, one of our best operators".

Sinn Féin and others "claimed that there must have been collusion with the security forces, because only a small number of people knew in advance of the reduced police presence at the funerals". Stone subsequently claimed that he had assurances that the security forces would not be deployed in the graveyard, and also claimed to have had detailed information about their movements on that day. Stone alleged that on the night before the attack, he was "given his pick of weapons from an Ulster Resistance cache at a secret location outside Belfast" and was "driven back into the city by a member of the RUC". According to journalist Martin Dillon, the weapons he used were given to him on the orders of UDA intelligence chief Brian Nelson, who was later revealed to be an undercover agent of the Force Research Unit (FRU), a covert British military intelligence unit.

In March 1989, Stone was convicted of the three murders at Milltown, of three paramilitary murders before and of other offences, receiving sentences totalling 682 years. Many hardline loyalists saw him as a hero and he became a loyalist icon. After his conviction, an issue of the UDA magazine Ulster was devoted to Stone, stating that he "stood bravely in the middle of rebel scum and let them have it". Apart from time on remand spent in Crumlin Road Prison, Stone spent all of his sentence in HM Prison Maze. Stone was released under the Good Friday Agreement after serving 13 years. Author and journalist Martin Dillon interviewed Stone in prison and published a book about him in 1992, Stone Cold: The True Story of Michael Stone and the Milltown Massacre.

Stone later published an autobiography, None Shall Divide Us, which included an account of the attack, in which he wrote that he deeply regretted the hurt he had caused the families of those he killed and paid tribute to the bravery of two of the men killed while pursuing him at the cemetery (Murray, Mac Brádaigh). Stone wrote "I didn't choose killing as a career, killing chose me". Stone later alleged that while being held in police custody after the attack, a young RUC officer asked him to sign a copy of the RUC's in-house magazine Police Beat that had Chief Constable John Hermon's face on the cover. In November 2006, Stone was charged with attempted murder of Martin McGuinness and Gerry Adams, having been arrested attempting to enter the parliament buildings at Stormont while armed. He was subsequently convicted and sentenced to a further 16 years' imprisonment. Stone was released on parole in 2021.

== Use of Stone's captured weapons by the IRA ==
The pistol's Stone used during the attack were seized by Republican sympathisers on the day of the attack before the RUC arrived, and were eventually handed over to the IRA to be used in gun attacks of their own. The 9mm Browning pistol was used in the murder of Ulster Defence Regiment lance-corporal Roy Butler in August 1988, as well as the killing of RUC Constable Samuel Todd in September 1990, while the Ruger revolver was determined to be the murder weapon in the shooting of Ulster Clubs member Colin Abernethy in September 1988. Although the Browning was never recovered by authorities, the Ruger was later seized in June 1990 by Belgian police investigating the murder of two Australian tourists who the IRA had mistaken for off-duty British Army of the Rhine soldiers in southern Holland.

== Corporals killings ==
Three days later, during the funeral of one of Stone's victims, Caoimhín Mac Brádaigh, two British Army corporals, Derek Wood and David Howes, wearing civilian clothes and in a civilian Volkswagen Passat drove into the path of the funeral cortège, apparently by mistake. Many of those present believed the soldiers were loyalists intent on repeating Stone's attack. An angry crowd surrounded and attacked their car. Wood drew his service pistol and fired a shot in the air. The two men were then dragged from the car before being taken away, beaten and shot dead by the IRA. Like the attack at Milltown, much of it was filmed by television news cameras.

== See also ==
- Timeline of Ulster Defence Association actions
