= Seán Savage =

Provisional IRA member (1965–1988)

- Born: Seán Savage; 26 January 1965; Belfast, Northern Ireland
- Died: 6 March 1988 (aged 23); Gibraltar
- Cause of death: Multiple gunshot wounds
- Resting place: Milltown Cemetery, Belfast, Northern Ireland
- Other names: Seán Sabhaois

Seán Savage (Irish: Seán Sabhaois) (26 January 1965 – 6 March 1988) was a member of the Provisional IRA who was shot dead by the British Army whilst allegedly attempting to plant a car bomb in Gibraltar. The car believed to hold the bomb planted by Savage and his fellow conspirers was later found to hold no bomb.

== Early life ==
Born into an Irish Republican family in the Kashmir Street area of Belfast, Savage was educated at St. Gall's Primary School, and at St. Paul's Secondary School in the Falls Road area of West Belfast.

== Paramilitary activity ==
In 1987 Savage and Daniel McCann shot two Royal Ulster Constabulary officers dead at Belfast docks.

Savage was the leader of an IRA attack that placed a booby-trap car bomb beneath the car of John McMichael, an Ulster loyalist paramilitary, in Lisburn in December 1987. McMichael died of his injuries two hours after the blast.

=== Gibraltar attack ===
In March 1988, Savage and McCann, along with another Provisional IRA member Mairéad Farrell, were sent to the British overseas territory of Gibraltar to plant a bomb in the town area targeting a British Army band which paraded weekly in front of the Governors' residence. However, the British Government had acquired information about the intended attack and specially dispatched a British Army detachment there to intercept it, in an operation that it code-named Operation Flavius. On 6 March 1988 Savage, McCann and Farrell entered Gibraltar from across the Spanish border to carry out a reconnaissance of the target. Having conducted it, they were leaving Gibraltar on foot approaching the Spanish border in two separate parties, when Savage saw ahead at eyesight distance McCann and Farrell being confronted and shot dead by soldiers from the Special Air Service Regiment. Savage turned about and fled, running back into Gibraltar town, closely pursued on foot by another SAS soldier, who after a 300-yard chase caught up with Savage and shot him dead beneath a beech tree in Smith Dorrien Avenue. Civilian witnesses to the incident stated afterwards that Savage was repeatedly fired upon by the soldier that had run him down whilst he was lying on the ground seemingly incapacitated.

The IRA team was subsequently found to be unarmed at the time of their deaths. A hire car rented by them, converted into a car bomb containing 140 lb (64 kg) of Semtex, with a device timed to go off during the changing of the guard ceremony in Gibraltar, was found two days later by the Spanish Police, who had assisted the British Government in tracking the IRA team's movements in its territory before it had entered Gibraltar.

== Milltown Cemetery attack ==
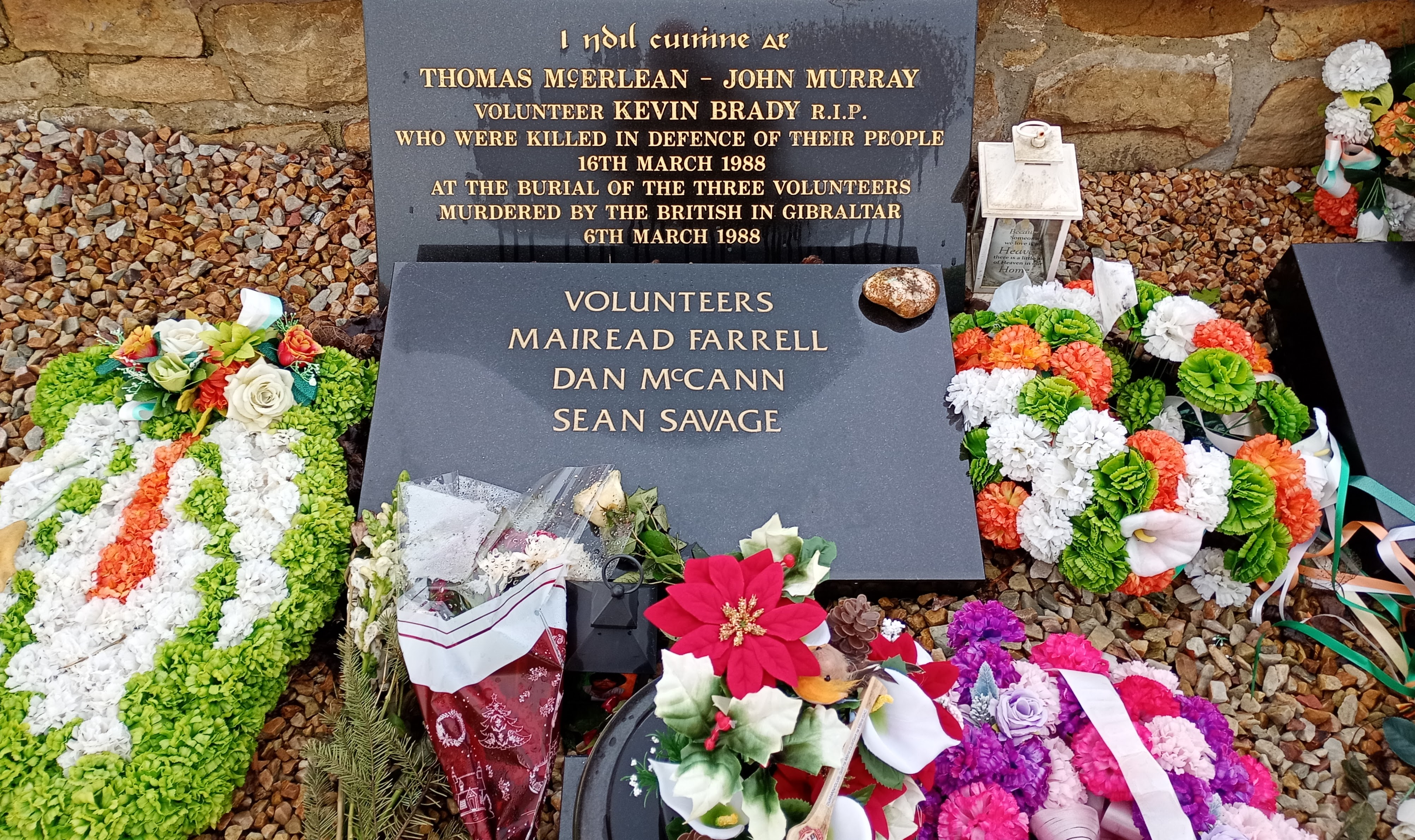
Grave of Savage, Mairéad Farrell and Daniel McCann in Milltown Cemetery, Belfast

Savage's body, along with Farrell and McCann's were repatriated to Northern Ireland, where a collective IRA-sponsored funeral was held for them on 16 March 1988 at the IRA plot in Milltown Cemetery in West Belfast. As the coffins were being lowered into the ground, Michael Stone, an Ulster loyalist paramilitary, staged a single-handed attack upon the ceremony, throwing hand grenades and firing a handgun at mourners. The funeral immediately descended into chaos. One group of mourners pursued the retreating attacker, who continued to throw handgrenades and fire bullets, through cemetery grounds. Three of these unarmed mourners were killed and scores were injured. Stone retreated on to the adjoining M1 motorway, where he was arrested.

== Subsequent events ==
A Gibraltar inquest into the deaths of Savage, McCann and Farrell concluded the three had been lawfully killed. In 1995, the European Court of Human Rights ruled that the human rights of the three were infringed, and criticized the British authorities for lack of control in the arrest operation. They also ruled that the three had been engaged in an act of terrorism, and consequently dismissed unanimously the applicants’ claims for damages, for costs and expenses incurred in the Gibraltar Inquest and the remainder of the claims for just satisfaction.

A British television documentary, Death on the Rock (1988) was produced and broadcast about the failed IRA operation in Gibraltar, examining the details of the events, and raising doubts about aspects of the British Government's statements about the circumstances of the shootings of the IRA team, and questioning whether excessive force had been used in the confrontation in line with persistent rumours in the British media at that time of a "Shoot to Kill" strategy being used against the Provisional IRA by the British Government.
