= Mairéad Farrell (IRA activist) =

IRA member (1957–1988)

- Mairéad Farrell
- Born: 3 March 1957; Belfast, Northern Ireland
- Died: 6 March 1988 (aged 31); Gibraltar
- Cause of death: Internal haemorrhaging caused by multiple bullet wounds
- Resting place: Milltown Cemetery, Belfast, Northern Ireland
- Other name: Máiréad Ní Fhearghail / Ní Fhearail
- Relatives: Mairéad Farrell (niece)

Mairéad Farrell (Irish: Máiréad Ní Fhearghail or Mairéad Ní Fhearail; 3 March 1957 – 6 March 1988) was a member of the Provisional Irish Republican Army (IRA). She was shot and killed by the Special Air Service in Gibraltar during Operation Flavius.

== Early life ==
Farrell was born in Belfast, Northern Ireland, on 3 March 1957 to a middle-class family with no link to militant Irish republicanism other than a grandfather who had been interned during the Irish War for Independence. She grew up in West Belfast and was educated at Rathmore Convent School, Belfast. At the age of 14 she was recruited into the Provisional IRA by Bobby Storey. After leaving school at the age of 18, she was hired as a clerical worker for an insurance broker's office.

== IRA activity, 1975–1976 ==
On 1 March 1976, the British government revoked Special Category Status for prisoners convicted from this date under anti-terrorism legislation. In response, the IRA instigated a wave of bombings and shootings across Northern Ireland; younger members such as Farrell were asked to participate. On 5 April 1976, along with Kieran Doherty and Sean McDermott, she attempted to plant a bomb at the Conway Hotel in Dunmurry which had often been used by British soldiers on temporary duty to Northern Ireland. She was arrested by Royal Ulster Constabulary (RUC) officers within an hour of planting the bomb. Her boyfriend McDermott was shot dead by an RUC reservist at a nearby housing estate. McDermott and two other members of the IRA active service unit had broken into a home, not realising it was the private residence of a policeman. The RUC officer shot McDermott dead; Doherty and another man escaped.

At her trial, Farrell refused to recognise the court as it was an institution of the British state. She was sentenced to fourteen years in prison for explosives offences, firearms offences and belonging to an illegal organisation.

== Imprisonment, 1976–1986 ==
At Armagh prison, Farrell was the commanding officer of the female IRA prisoners.

When she arrived in Armagh, Farrell began a protest for political status, along with the male prisoners in H-Blocks of HMP Maze. As women prisoners in Northern Ireland already had the right to wear their own clothes this did not involve a blanket protest, but it did involve refusing to work or co-operate with the prison authorities. They began a no-wash protest in February 1980; this meant that prisoners refused to slop out and would smear excrement and menstrual material on the walls of their cells instead of risking being attacked by the guards while slopping out. After 13 months, Farrell, along with Mary Doyle and Mairead Nugent, began a hunger strike in Armagh prison a month after the men in Long Kesh had begun theirs; their intention to go on hunger strike was announced on 22 November, commencing on 1 December. On 18 December, the 'Armagh Three' heard, on a smuggled radio, that the men's fast at Long Kesh had come to an end; despite their elation, they decided to maintain their strike until the news had been confirmed by a republican source. On 19 December, the rapidly deteriorating women received confirmation and ended the hunger strike after nineteen days. The dirty protest ended in March 1981 as the prisoners' rights campaign was focused on the hunger strike being undertaken by Bobby Sands, leader of IRA prisoners in the H-Blocks. She was one of the H-Block/Armagh prisoners to stand for election in the Republic of Ireland in the 1981 General Election, standing in Cork North-Central and polling 2,751 votes (6.05%).

== Gibraltar and death ==
Upon her release from prison in October 1986, Farrell enrolled at Queen's University Belfast for a course in Political Science and Economics; however, she dropped out to re-engage in IRA activity. The IRA sent her with Sean Savage and Daniel McCann to the British overseas territory of Gibraltar to plant a car bomb in a heavily populated town area. The target was the band and guard of the 1st Battalion of the Royal Anglian Regiment during a weekly ceremonial changing of the guard in front of the Governors' residence, on 8 March 1988. According to interrogated IRA members, Gibraltar had been selected as a target because it was a British possession that was in dispute, and the security measures that were in force were less rigorous than those being applied at British military installations elsewhere at the time due to the IRA's campaign.

The British government's domestic intelligence service MI5 had become aware of their plan, and a detachment from the British Army was specifically deployed to Gibraltar to intercept the IRA team and prevent the attack. Farrell, Savage and McCann were confronted by plainclothes soldiers from the Special Air Service Regiment whilst they were engaged in a reconnaissance in Gibraltar pending the delivery of the car bomb. Farrell was shot three times in the back and once in the face; her two accomplices were also killed in an operation code-named Operation Flavius by the British Government. Some witnesses to the shooting stated that Farrell and McCann had been shot while attempting to surrender, and while lying wounded on the ground. The three IRA members were all found afterwards to be unarmed. Keys to a hire car found in Farrell's handbag led the Spanish Police, who had closely worked with the British security services in Operation Flavius, to the discovery across the border in Spain of five packages totalling 84 kg of Semtex explosive in a car which the IRA team had intended to subsequently drive into Gibraltar for the attack. These packages had four separate detonators attached. Around this was packed 200 rounds of ammunition as shrapnel. There were two timers, marked 10 hrs 45 mins and 11 hrs 15 mins respectively, but they were not primed or connected.

== Gibraltar inquest ==
At the inquest into the deaths held in Gibraltar the jury returned a verdict of lawful killing by a 9–2 majority. The coroner, in summing up the evidence to the jury, told them to avoid an open verdict. The 9–2 verdict is the smallest majority allowed. Paddy McGrory, lawyer for Amnesty International, believed that it had been a "perverse verdict," and that it had gone against the weight of the evidence.

Carmen Proetta, an independent witness, told Thames Television, 'They [the security forces] didn't do anything ... they just went and shot these people. That's all. They didn't say anything, they didn't scream, they didn't shout, they didn't do anything. These people were turning their heads back to see what was happening and when they saw these men had guns in their hands they put their hands up. It looked like the man was protecting the girl because he stood in front of her, but there was no chance. I mean they went to the floor immediately, they dropped.'

Stephen Bullock, a lawyer by profession, who was 150 metres from the shooting, and another independent witness saw Dan McCann falling backwards with his hands at shoulder height. At the inquest into the killings Bullock stated, 'I think with one step he could have actually touched the person he was shooting'.

The researcher for Thames Television which made the programme Death on the Rock believed Ms Proetta's evidence as it matched another account they had received. The scientific evidence provided by pathologist Professor Alan Watson also corroborated the evidence of Proetta, Bullock and a third witness, Josie Celecia.

Five independent civil liberty organisations have criticised many aspects of the proceedings during the inquest, and have called for further inquiries into the killings in Gibraltar. They are the International Association of Democratic Lawyers, Inquest the National Council for Civil Liberties (London), the International League for Human Rights (New York) and Amnesty International.

The report by Amnesty International stated that the inquest had failed to answer 'the fundamental issue... whether the fatal shootings were caused by what happened in the street, or whether the authorities planned in advance for the three to be shot dead.'

== European Court of Human Rights ==
The relatives of McCann, Savage and Farrell were dissatisfied with the response to their case in the British legal system, so they took their case to the European Court of Human Rights in 1995. The court found that the three had been unlawfully killed. By a 10–9 majority it ruled that the human rights of the 'Gibraltar Three' had been infringed in breach of Article 2 – right to life, of the European Convention on Human Rights and criticised the authorities for lack of appropriate care in the control and organisation of the arrest operation.

In sum, having regard to the decision not to prevent the suspects from travelling into Gibraltar, to the failure of the authorities to make sufficient allowances for the possibility that their intelligence assessments might, in some respects at least, be erroneous and to the automatic recourse to lethal force when the soldiers opened fire, the Court is not persuaded that the killing of the three terrorists constituted the use of force which was no more than absolutely necessary in defence of persons from unlawful violence within the meaning of Article 2(2)(a) of the Convention

In the Judgement the court said that the actions of the authorities lacked 'the degree of caution in the use of firearms to be expected from law enforcement personnel in a democratic society.' Some newspapers reported the decision as a finding that the three had been unlawfully killed.

The ECHR also ruled that the three had been engaged in an act of terrorism, and consequently dismissed unanimously the applicants' claims for damages, for costs and expenses incurred in the Gibraltar Inquest and the remainder of the claims for just satisfaction.

The Court is not empowered to overrule national decisions or annul national laws.

== Related events ==
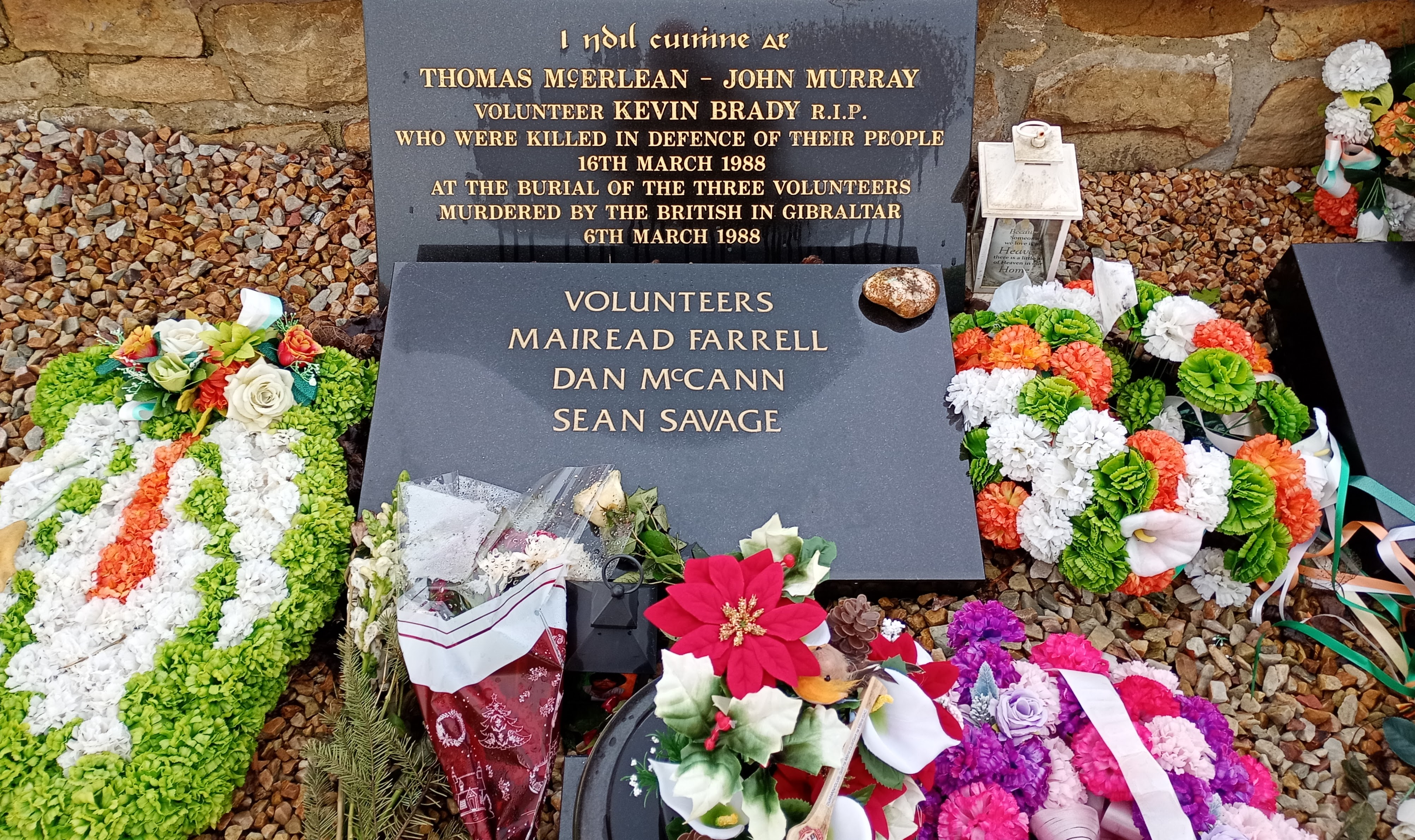
Grave of Farrell, Daniel McCann and Seán Savage in Milltown Cemetery, Belfast

In the aftermath of the shooting on Gibraltar, violence escalated in the Belfast area and resulted in at least six further deaths. The three bodies were returned to Belfast on 14 March. That evening an IRA sniper, Kevin McCracken, was shot dead in Norglen Crescent, Turf Lodge, Belfast while preparing to attack British soldiers. Those attending the return of the bodies said that the security services were harassing them and that he was attacking the security services to deflect their attention. According to witnesses, McCracken was beaten while lying wounded by members of the security services.

At the funeral of the 'Gibraltar Three' on 16 March, three mourners were killed in a gun and grenade attack by loyalist paramilitary Michael Stone in the Milltown Cemetery attack.

At the funeral of IRA member Caoimhín Mac Brádaigh on 19 March – one of the three men killed three days earlier by Michael Stone – two British Army corporals, Derek Wood and David Howes, drove into the funeral cortège, apparently by accident but mourners evidently feared an attack similar to Stone's was taking place. Scenes relayed on television showed the two corporals being cornered by black taxis and dragged from their car before being taken away to be beaten, stripped, and then executed.

On 10 September 1990, the IRA attempted to kill Air Chief Marshal Sir Peter Terry at his Staffordshire home. Terry had been a prime target since his days as Governor of Gibraltar, where he signed the documents allowing the SAS to pursue IRA members. The attack took place at 9 pm at the Main Road house. The gunman opened fire through a window hitting Sir Peter at least nine times and injuring his wife near one of her eyes. The couple's daughter was found to be suffering from shock. Terry's face had to be rebuilt as the shots shattered his face and two high-velocity bullets were within millimetres of his brain.

A few months before she was killed, Farrell had been interviewed for the documentary Mother Ireland, directed by Anne Crilly, which was subsequently deemed untransmittable due to the 1988 broadcasting restrictions. Channel 4 eventually screened the documentary on 11 April 1991, with Farrell's voice having been de-dubbed to comply with the restrictions.

In 2008 Sinn Féin asked to hold an International Women's Day event in the Long Gallery at Stormont commemorating Farrell. The Assembly Commission, which runs the Stormont estate, ruled that it could not go ahead.

== Media comment ==
The New York Times, reviewing a Frontline documentary examining the circumstances of Farrell's death, stated: 'Miss Farrell might be dismissed as some wild-eyed fanatic except that part of her life has been preserved in several home movies and a television interview taped shortly before her death. What emerges is a portrait of a soft-spoken, attractive woman determined to end what she perceived as the injustices surrounding her everyday life.... The program leaves us pondering the obvious conclusion: "To the people of Falls Road she was a patriot. To the British she was a terrorist. To her family she was a victim of Irish history."'
