= Republican plot =

Cemetery plot in Ireland

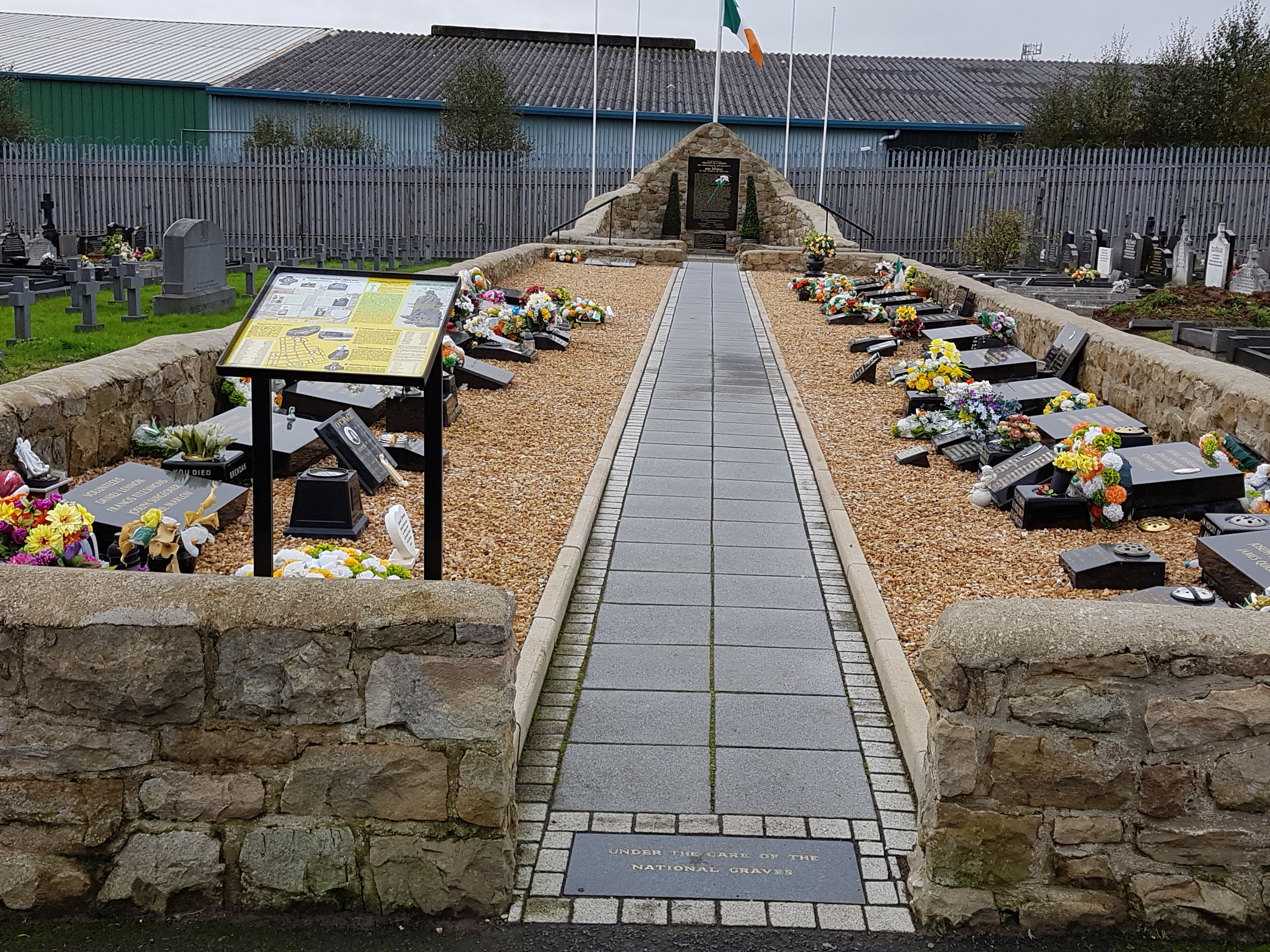
Republican Plot, Milltown Cemetery

In Ireland, a republican plot is a cemetery plot where combatants or members of various Irish republican organisations are buried in a group of adjacent graves, rather than being buried with family members. These plots often hold the bodies of casualties of earlier 19th and 20th-century campaigns by organisations such as the Fenians or the IRA.

Most republican plots are owned and maintained by the National Graves Association. Notable Republican plots include those at Glasnevin Cemetery in Dublin, and Milltown Cemetery in Belfast, the Belfast graveyard was the site of a fatal attack on a Republican funeral in 1988 by a loyalist paramilitary, Michael Stone.

Republican plots are the focus of annual commemorations by Republican groups and also by political parties such as Fianna Fáil, the Workers' Party and Sinn Féin and its offshoots, each group commemorating its own fallen, as Fianna Fáil commemorations focus exclusively on members of the Old IRA. Commemorations take place on dates such as Easter Monday (to commemorate the Easter Rising), and the anniversaries of the death of those buried in the plots.

Annual commemorations also take place at the grave of Theobald Wolfe Tone at Bodenstown in Sallins, Co Kildare and at the graves of the leaders of the Easter Rising at Arbour Hill Prison in Dublin.

== Sources ==
'Memorials to the Casualties of Conflict: Northern Ireland 1969 to 1997' by Jane Leonard
