= Daniel McCann =

IRA member (1957–1988)

- Born: Daniel McCann; 30 November 1957; Clonard, Belfast, Northern Ireland
- Died: 6 March 1988 (aged 30); Gibraltar
- Cause of death: Multiple gunshot wounds
- Resting place: Milltown Cemetery, Belfast, Northern Ireland

Daniel McCann (30 November 1957 – 6 March 1988) was a member of the Provisional Irish Republican Army (IRA), who was shot dead by the British Army on 6 March 1988 while being accused of attempting to plant a car bomb in Gibraltar.

== Early life ==
McCann was born into an Irish republican family from the Clonard area of West Belfast. He was educated at primary level at St Gall's Primary School, Belfast, and at St Mary's Grammar School, Belfast. McCann did not finish his education as he was arrested after becoming involved in rioting. He was charged and convicted of "riotous behaviour" and sentenced to six months in prison. Later that year McCann joined the Provisional IRA. He was later convicted and sentenced to two years imprisonment for the possession of explosives.

== Paramilitary activity ==
In 1987 McCann along with another IRA member, Sean Savage, murdered two Royal Ulster Constabulary officers at Belfast docks.

In 1988 McCann and Savage, along with Mairead Farrell, another IRA member, were sent to the British overseas territory of Gibraltar to plant a bomb in the town area, targeting a British Army band which paraded weekly in connection with the changing of the guard in front of the Governors' residence.

The British Government knew in advance about the operation, and specially dispatched to Gibraltar a British Army detachment to intercept the IRA team. Whilst McCann, Savage and Farrell were engaged on 6 March 1988 on a reconnaissance trip in Gibraltar before driving in a car-bomb, soldiers from the Special Air Service Regiment wearing civilian clothes confronted them in the streets of the town. McCann was shot five times at close-range, the SAS soldiers later claiming that he had made an 'aggressive move' when approached. Farrell who was with McCann was also shot dead. Savage was walking separately behind McCann and Farrell within eyesight distance, and seeing them ahead being confronted and fired upon, fled, running several hundred yards back into Gibraltar town closely pursued on foot by another Special Air Service soldier, who caught up with him and shot him dead also. All three IRA members were subsequently found to be unarmed.

A car bomb ready to be driven into Gibraltar that had been created by McCann, Savage and Farrell was found 36 miles away in Spain by the Spanish Police two days after their deaths, containing 140 lb (64 kg) of Semtex with a device timed to go off during the changing of the guard in Gibraltar.

== Subsequent events ==
A documentary entitled Death on the Rock, was produced and broadcast on British television about the failed IRA operation in Gibraltar shortly after it had taken place, detailing the British and Spanish Government's actions and that of the IRA team, in an operation that the British Government had code-named Operation Flavius. The documentary also interviewed civilian eyewitnesses to the shooting of the Provisional IRA members, raising questions about the veracity of the British Government and its involved soldiers' accounts of it, focusing on whether the three IRA members had been offered the chance to surrender by the soldiers confronting them before they had been fired upon. It also questioned whether the violence used had been proportionate, in line with ongoing rumours in the British media of a purported "Shoot to Kill" policy that the British Government was at that point pursuing against the Provisional IRA in The Troubles.

== Funeral ==
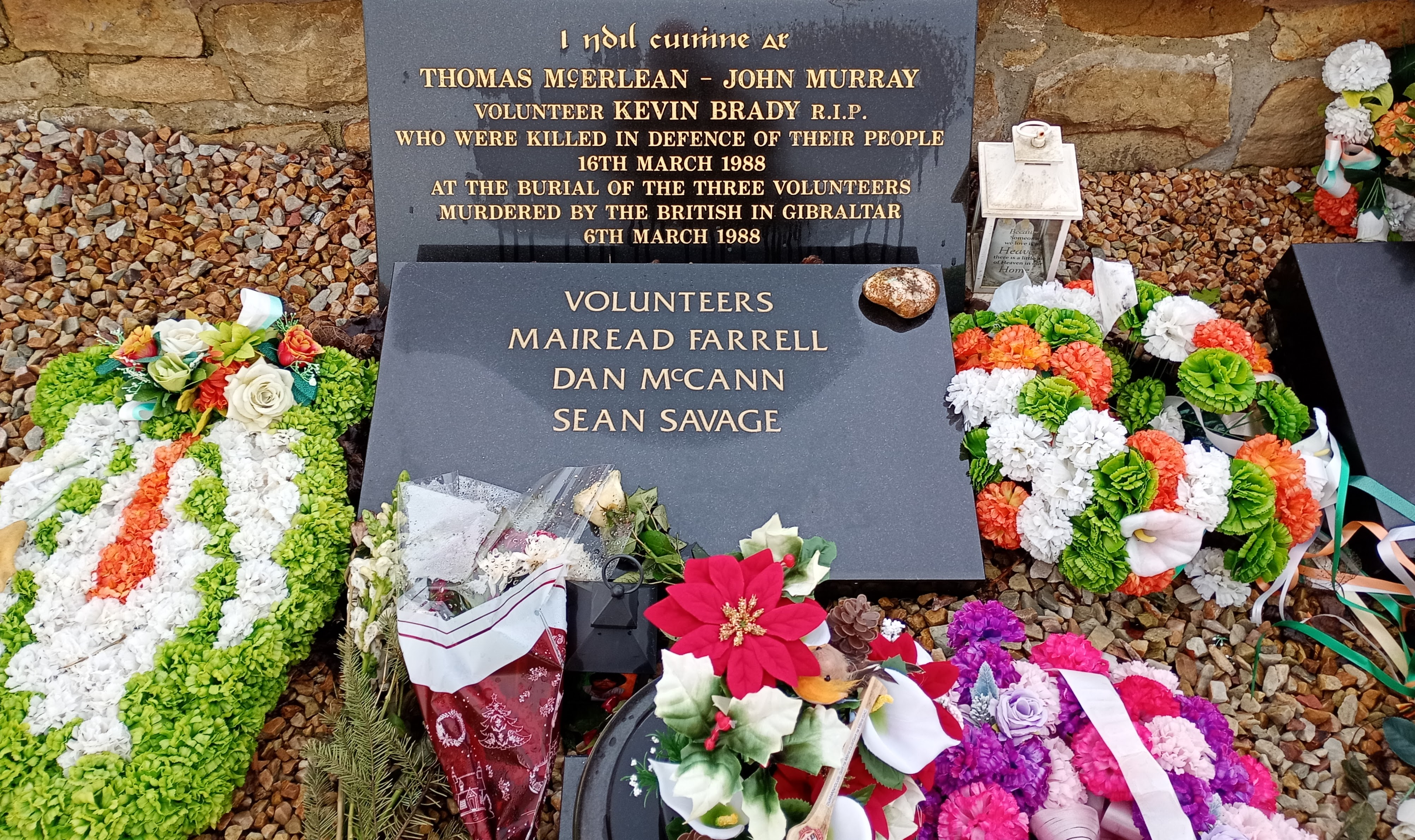
Grave of McCann, Mairéad Farrell and Seán Savage in Milltown Cemetery, Belfast

At an IRA-sponsored collective funeral on 16 March 1988 for McCann's body along with that of Savage and Farrell's at the IRA plot in Milltown Cemetery in West Belfast, as the bodies were being lowered into the ground the funeral party came under a hand-grenade attack from a lone Loyalist paramilitary. The funeral immediately descended into chaotic scenes, as a running fight occurred between the lone gunman firing a handgun and throwing more grenades at a group of mourners, as they pursued him through the cemetery's grounds. Three mourners were killed and scores wounded in the incident.

== Bibliography ==
- Gerry Adams, Hope and History: Making Peace in Ireland, Brandon Books, 2003. ISBN 0-86322-330-3
