= Timeline of BBC Radio 4 =

A timeline of notable events relating to BBC Radio 4, a British national radio station which began broadcasting in September 1967.

== 1960s ==
- 1967
  - 30 September – BBC Radio 4 launches at 6:35am, replacing the BBC Home Service. The first programme to be broadcast is Farming Today.
  - 22 December – Panel game Just a Minute is first aired with Nicholas Parsons as chairman (initially as a temporary stand-in). He would go on to present the programme until 2019.
  - Your Hundred Best Tunes, Choral Evensong, and Listen with Mother are broadcast on Radio 4 for the first time.
- 1968
  - No events.
- 1969
  - 10 July – The BBC publishes a report called "Broadcasting in the Seventies" proposing the reorganisation of programmes on the national networks and replacing regional broadcasting on BBC Radio 4 with BBC Local Radio.

== 1970s ==
- 1970
  - 28 March – Live sport is broadcast on all Radio 4 frequencies for the final time ahead of the transfer of all sports coverage to Radio 2 from the following week.
  - 1 April – Choral Evensong is broadcast on Radio 4 for the final time, it transfers to Radio 3 from the following week.
  - 3 April – For the first time, both airings of Any Questions are broadcast on Radio 4. Previously, the station had only broadcast the Saturday repeat as the Friday night debut broadcast had been on Radio 2.
  - 5 April – Your Hundred Best Tunes moves from Radio 4 to Radio 2.
  - 6 April
    - The first editions of PM and The World Tonight are broadcast.
    - The first Thought for the Day is broadcast, replacing Ten to Eight.
    - The first edition of Start the Week is broadcast with Richard Baker as presenter.
  - 10 April – The first broadcast of a new news and current affairs programme Analysis.
  - 6 September – Sunday, which looks at topical religious and ethical issues, launches.
  - 5 October – The consumer affairs programme You and Yours makes its debut.
- 1971
  - 4 November – Radio 4 (and Radio 2) begin broadcasting in stereo in South East England. Stereo was rolled out to the rest of the country over subsequent years.
- 1972
  - 2 April – The first edition of the comedy panel game I'm Sorry I Haven't a Clue airs.
  - 2 September
    - Radio 4 begins transmitting on one of their MW frequencies – 1151, 1052, 908 or 692 kHz (251, 285, 330 to 434 metres).
    - All regional variations begin airing only on VHF, likely due to BBC Local Radio beginning broadcasts on this day on MW.
- 1973
  - 9 April – The first edition of Kaleidoscope is broadcast.
  - 29 June – Programmes For Schools are broadcast on all Radio 4 frequencies for the final time. From next term, they are aired only on VHF/FM.
  - 2 July
    - Woman's Hour is transferred from Radio 2 to Radio 4
    - Hourly news bulletins during weekday daytimes are introduced.
  - 23 December – I'm Sorry, I'll Read That Again airs its last episode.
- 1974
  - 28 September – Stop the Week is broadcast for the first time.
- 1975
  - 9 June – Proceedings in the Parliament of the United Kingdom are broadcast on radio for the first time and Radio 4 broadcasts the first two hours of that day's proceedings.
- 1976
  - 4 January – First broadcast of the panel game Quote... Unquote.
  - 27 August – First broadcast of the sketch comedy show The Burkiss Way.
- 1977
  - 30 April – The first edition of Sport on Four is broadcast.
  - 2 May – Radio 4 launches a new breakfast programme Up to the Hour. Consequently, The Today Programme is reduced from a continuous two-hour programme to two 25-minute slots.
  - 1 July – Radio 4 extends the 6pm news on weekdays from 15 to 30 minutes and renames the bulletin to The Six O’Clock News. The weekend 6pm news bulletin remains as a 15-minute broadcast and continues to be listed as News. This is the flagship change to a number of schedule alterations, which include The Archers moving from 6:45pm to 7:05 pm.
  - 22 August – The BBC Radio comedy The Men from the Ministry airs its final episode after fifteen years on air.
  - 2 October – The first edition of Money Box is broadcast.
- 1978
  - 3 April – Permanent radio broadcasts of proceedings in the House of Commons begin. Radio 4 marks the first day with an afternoon of live coverage. The station goes on to broadcast Prime Minister's Questions for the next year.
  - 3 July – Changes are made to the station's weekday breakfast schedule. After just over a year on air, Up to the Hour is cancelled. Consequently, Today once again becomes a continuous two-hour programme. Also, a new weekday 6am News Briefing is introduced.
  - 23 November
    - Radio 4's AM service moves from medium wave to 1500m (200kHz) long wave as part of a plan to improve national AM reception, and to conform with the Geneva Frequency Plan of 1975. However, long wave reception is not universal in some parts of the UK where long wave reception is poor, filler transmitters on MW are used.
    - The shipping forecast transfers from Radio 2 to Radio 4 so that the forecast can continue to be broadcast on long wave.
    - The Radio 4 UK Theme is used for the first time to coincide with the network becoming a fully national service for the first time and to mark this the station is officially known as Radio 4 UK.
  - 22 December – Industrial action at the BBC by the ABS union, which started the previous day, extends to radio when the radio unions join their television counterparts by going on strike, forcing the BBC to merge its four national radio networks into one national radio station from 4pm and called it the BBC All Network Radio Service. The strike is settled shortly before 10pm on that day, with the unions and BBC management reaching an agreement at the British government's industrial disputes arbitration service ACAS.
- 1979
  - 1 April – The first edition of Feedback is broadcast.
  - 30 September – First broadcast of The Food Programme.
  - 5 October – First broadcast of Poetry Please.
  - 15 November – Radio 4 begins broadcasting on MW in London. Listeners struggle to get buzz-free and crackle-free reception on long wave due to large steel-framed buildings. This issue does not affect MW broadcasts so the transmitter is brought into service to provide a satisfactory signal for the station's long wave output for listeners in central London.

== 1980s ==
- 1980
  - Summer – Due to the continued expansion of BBC Local Radio, regional opt-out programming ends, apart from in the south west as this is now the only part of England still without any BBC local station.
- 1981
  - No events.
- 1982
  - 10 September – After 32 years on air, Listen with Mother is broadcast for the final time. It is replaced three days later by a shorter five minute lunchtime programme called Listening Corner which is transmitted on FM only whilst long wave listeners receive the lunchtime Shipping Forecast.
  - 31 December – The last regional opt-out programming ends when the final edition of Morning Sou'West is broadcast ahead of the forthcoming launch of BBC Radio Devon and BBC Radio Cornwall.
- 1983
  - 1 February – In Business is broadcast for the first time.
- 1984
  - 5 April – Radio 4 begins what is described in Radio Times as "a new three-hour sequence – a six-month broadcast experiment in which you are invited to participate." The programme is called Rollercoaster and is presented by Richard Baker. The "Grand Finale of Radio 4's rollicking rolling experiment" takes place on 27 September and was not repeated.
  - 27 July – David Jacobs chairs Any Questions? for the final time.
  - 14 September – John Timpson chairs Any Questions? for the first time.
  - 29 September
    - The post-midnight Shipping Forecast starts being broadcast 18 minutes later than before, moving to a start time of 00:33.
    - Radio 4 starts broadcasting 30 minutes earlier at the weekend when it launches a 20-minute Prelude, described as "a musical start to your weekend listening". Consequently, the station is now on air every day from just before 6am until 12:30am.
    - The Radio 4 UK branding is dropped and the station is now officially simply known as Radio 4.
- 1985
  - 28 June – The final weeknight Study on 4 broadcast takes place.
  - 29 June – Study on 4 is renamed Options and from this date, all of BBC Radio's adult educational programming is now broadcast on weekend afternoons. The programmes continue to be broadcast only on VHF/FM. This means that Radio 4's output on weeknights between 11pm and 11:30pm – i.e. all of The World Tonight and The Financial World Tonight – are now also broadcast on VHF/FM.
  - 25 July–8 August – During the 1985 school Summer holidays, Radio 4 broadcasts an all-morning children's programme called Pirate Radio 4 on Thursday mornings. Three editions of it are aired. It is broadcast on VHF/FM only with the usual Radio 4 schedule continuing on long wave. It would return the following Summer for three more editions.
- 1986
  - 5 January – Michael Parkinson takes over as host of Desert Island Discs following the death the previous year of Roy Plomley.
  - 24 December – John Timpson presents The Today programme for the final time.
  - 28 December – Apna Hi Ghar Samajhiye (Make Yourself at Home) is broadcast for the final time. The programme, aimed at the Asian community, had been broadcast on Radio 4 and the BBC Home Service every Sunday morning since 1965.
- 1987
  - 3 January – The Today programme is extended to six days a week when it launches a Saturday edition and John Humphrys joins the programme's presenting team as John Timpson's replacement.
  - 17 July – John Timpson chairs Any Questions? for the final time.
  - 4 September – Jonathan Dimbleby chairs Any Questions? for the first time.
  - 27 October – Radio 4 launches a new twice-weekly soap opera called Citizens.
- 1988
  - 1 February – Radio 4's long wave frequency is adjusted from 200 kHz to 198 kHz.
  - 27 March – Sue Lawley replaces Michael Parkinson as host of Desert Island Discs.
- 1989
  - 26 May – Radio 4 airs the 10,000th episode of The Archers.

== 1990s ==
- 1990
  - 23 June – Ahead of the transfer of all of BBC radio's educational programmes to the forthcoming BBC Radio 5, the last edition of Options, the BBC's weekend afternoon strand of adult educational programmes which had been transmitted as a weekend afternoon opt-out from the main schedule on FM, is broadcast.
  - 29 June – Programmes For Schools are broadcast on Radio 4 for the final time.
  - 20 August – The Moral Maze is broadcast for the first time.
  - 24 August – Listening Corner, the weekday lunchtime programme for small children, is broadcast for the final time.
  - 26 August – Open University programmes are broadcast on Radio 4 for the final time until they return to Radio 4 in 1994 when Radio 5 is replaced by BBC Radio 5 Live.
  - 27 August – The launch of Radio 5 sees the full Radio 4 schedule broadcast on FM for the first time.
- 1991
  - 17 January–2 March – BBC Radio 4 News FM, a rolling BBC Radio news service, is on air during the first Gulf War. It broadcasts on the station's FM frequencies, with Radio 4's regularly scheduled non-news programming continuing on long wave.
  - 25 July – The final episode of soap opera Citizens is broadcast.
  - 13 September – The Daily Service is broadcast on FM for the final time.
  - 16 September
    - The main Radio 4 service moves from long wave to FM as FM coverage has now been extended to cover almost all of the UK. Radio 4 didn't become available on FM in much of Scotland, Wales and Northern Ireland until the start of the 1990s. Opt-outs are transferred to long wave.
    - A new 30-minute religious slot at 10am on weekdays is launched, but is broadcast as an opt-out and therefore is only available on long wave. The first fifteen minutes is used to broadcast The Daily Service and this is followed by the launch of a 12-month series featuring readings from The Bible.
    - Woman’s Hour moves from early afternoons to a mid-morning slot.
- 1992
  - Late March–7 April – For the first time, Radio 4 long wave opts out of the main Radio 4 schedule to provide additional news coverage. It does so to provide live coverage of the latest developments in the general election campaign. Previously, additional news coverage had been broadcast on FM.
  - 14 July – The BBC announces plans for a new 24-hour radio news station on long wave. It would simulcast the main Radio 4 news programmes and focus on live news coverage when Radio 4's other shows were being aired, which, after the network's launch, would be broadcast exclusively on FM despite Radio 4's FM network still not reaching many rural parts of the UK outside of England and South Wales.
  - 25 July – Radio 4 stops the week for the final time, after having done so since 1974.
  - 15 October – The BBC announces plans to launch a continuous news service on Radio 4’s long wave frequency with the date of 5 April 1994 set as the launch date. The plan would result in Radio 4 broadcasting exclusively on FM.
- 1993
  - There is widespread opposition to the BBC's plans to launch a rolling news service on Radio 4’s long wave frequency and by the end of the year the proposals are dropped. But a new news and sport service BBC Radio 5 Live launches on MW the following year.
  - 18 December – BBC2 broadcasts the Arena special "Radio Night", an ambitious simulcast with Radio 4.
- 1994
  - 21 February – A new weekday afternoon magazine show starts, called Anderson Country. The programme proves divisive amongst the station's listenership over the different tone of it when compared with the rest of Radio 4. It is replaced after a year by The Afternoon Shift.
  - 25 March – The Financial World Tonight is broadcast on Radio 4 for the final time, ahead of its move to the new news and sport station Radio 5 Live.
  - 3 April – The closure of Radio 5 sees children's programmes return to Radio 4. However, instead of daily programmes, just one weekly 30-minute programme is broadcast, aired on Sunday evenings.
  - 8 April – Following the closure of Radio 5, Test Match Special is broadcast on Radio 4’s long wave frequency for the first time.
  - 10 April – Radio 5's closure sees adult education and Open University programmes return to Radio 4. They are broadcast on long wave only as a two-hour block on Sunday evenings. Open University programmes are broadcast between February and September with language courses aired from October until January.
- 1995
  - 27 September – Radio 4 begins to broadcast digitally following the commencement by the BBC of regular Digital Audio Broadcasting, initially only from the Crystal Palace transmitting station.
- 1996
  - James Boyle is appointed station controller.
- 1997
  - 31 August – Regular programming on the BBC’s radio and television stations is abandoned to provide ongoing news coverage of the death of Diana, Princess of Wales. Radio 4 airs a special programme from BBC Radio News, which is also carried on Radio 1, Radio 2, Radio 3, and Radio 5 Live. Radio 4 broadcasts live coverage of the funeral six days later.
  - September – In the aftermath of Princess Diana's death, the PM programme drops its theme tune which had been in use since 1993. This had been the third time it had used theme music and has not subsequently had a theme tune.
- 1998
  - 6 April – Extensive schedule changes take place. Many long-standing programmes are axed as part of the shake-up, including Breakaway, Week Ending and Sport on Four while arts programme Kaleidoscope is replaced by a new programme Front Row with Mark Lawson as its presenter. The changes coincide with an earlier start to the station's day, 5:30am instead of 6am and a 30-minute extension to the weekday editions of The Today programme.
  - 12 April – A Sunday episode of The Archers is introduced.
  - 19 April – A new Sunday morning current affairs programme Broadcasting House launches.
  - 15 October – In Our Time is broadcast for the first time.
- 1999
  - April – Roger Bolton, formally of Channel 4's viewer feedback programme Right to Reply, replaces Chris Dunkley as the presenter of Feedback. with his last episode being broadcast on 26 August 2022.
  - September – Open University broadcasts cease.

== 2000s ==
- 2000
  - March – Helen Boaden is appointed as controller.
  - 26 December – Radio 4 clears its Boxing Day schedule in order to broadcast an eight-hour reading of Harry Potter and the Philosopher's Stone, read by Stephen Fry.
- 2001
  - 15 April – The children's magazine show Go4It is broadcast for the first time.
  - Radio 4, along with other BBC Radio stations, stop broadcasting via Sky's analogue satellite service.
- 2002
  - 15 December – Radio 4 gets a digital spin-off station, BBC7. The station broadcasts content from BBC Radio's spoken word archive, repeating programmes previously broadcast on Radio 4, as well as airing daily programmes for children.
- 2003
  - No events.
- 2004
  - 20 February – Radio 4 airs the final Letter from America. The weekly 15-minute programme ran for 2,869 shows from 24 March 1946, making it the longest-running speech radio programme in history.
  - 20 September – Mark Damazer replaces Helen Boaden as Controller.
- 2005
  - No events.
- 2006
  - 23 April – The Radio 4 UK Theme is used for the last time, amid controversy over its axing by Radio 4 controller Mark Damazer. The decision to axe the theme, which had been used since 1978, to make way for a 'pacy news briefing' led to widespread coverage in the media and even debate in Parliament.
  - 24 June – The final edition of Home Truths is broadcast.
  - 27 August – Sue Lawley presents her final edition of Desert Island Discs after eighteen years. Her last castaway is the actress Joan Plowright.
  - 16 September – Saturday Live begins.
  - 1 October – Kirsty Young presents her first edition of Desert Island Discs. Her first castaway is the illustrator Quentin Blake.
- 2007
  - No events.
- 2008
  - 4 October – BBC7 is renamed BBC Radio 7 in an effort to bring it in line with other BBC Radio brands.
  - 14 October – You and Yours undergoes a significant change of format, with two presenters being replaced by one. The breadth of topics covered is extended to global problems as well as those closer to home.
- 2009
  - 24 May – Go4It is broadcast for the final time. The reason given is that it does not attract enough young listeners and that less than 1 in 20 of the show's audience is aged between 4 and 14, with the average age of the listeners being between 52 and 55. Consequently, there are now no children's programmes on BBC analogue radio.

== 2010s ==
- 2010
  - April – The newspaper review show What the Papers Say, which was on television for 52 years, is revived on Radio 4, airing for 12 episodes in the run-up to the 2010 general election. It would subsequently return on a permanent basis until March 2016.
  - September – Gwyneth Williams replaces Mark Damazer as station Controller.
  - 24 December – A Christmas message by Pope Benedict XVI is broadcast by Radio 4's Thought for the Day programme, the first time the Pontiff has addressed a Christmas message to one of the countries he has visited during the year.
- 2011
  - 2 April – BBC7 is rebranded as BBC Radio 4 Extra.
  - 7 November – The World at One is extended from 30 to 45 minutes.
- 2012
  - 5 May – BBC Breakfast presenter Sian Williams joins Radio 4's Saturday Live magazine programme to co-host alongside Rev. Richard Coles. It is also extended from 60 to 90 minutes.
  - 31 May – Radio 4 announces a five-and-a-half-hour celebration of James Joyce's Ulysses on the coming Bloomsday (16 June), claiming it as the novel's first full-length dramatisation in Britain.
  - 5 September – It is announced that continuity announcers Charlotte Green and Harriet Cass are to take voluntary redundancy as the BBC cuts the announcing team for the station from twelve to ten. Both had been with Radio 4 since the 1970s. Charlotte leaves in January 2013, with Harriet departing two months later.
- 2013
  - 16 July – Mishal Husain joins the presenting team of The Today programme.
- 2014
  - 31 January – It is announced that The Archers spin-off Ambridge Extra, which has been on air since 2011, is to be "rested".
  - 5 March – It is announced that Mark Lawson will step down as presenter of Radio 4's Front Row after 16 years as its host.
- 2015
  - 1 January – Radio 4 airs a 10-hour adaptation of Tolstoy's War and Peace written by Timberlake Wertenbaker.
  - 28 April – Sandi Toksvig announces she is to step down as presenter of Radio 4's The News Quiz after nine years.
  - 21 May – Figures released by RAJAR indicate that Radio 4 Extra has overtaken 6 Music as the most listened to digital-only radio station, with 2.17 million tuning in weekly to Radio 4 Extra compared to 2.06 million for 6 Music.
  - Autumn – Ahead of the departure of James Naughtie from The Today programme, Nick Robinson joins the presenting team.
  - 8 October – Radio 4 marks National Poetry Day with a series of poems telling the story of Britain. We British: An Epic In Poetry runs throughout the day and sees Andrew Marr, Dominic West and Fiona Shaw reading works by names such as Walter Raleigh, William Shakespeare, Geoffrey Chaucer and William Wordsworth.
  - 16 December – After 21 years, James Naughtie presents The Today programme for the final time.
- 2016
  - No events.
- 2017
  - 30 January – London Evening Standard editor Sarah Sands is appointed editor of The Today, replacing Jamie Angus. She becomes the second woman to take the role after Jenny Abramsky who was appointed to the position in 1986.
  - 29 March – Radio 4 broadcasts the magazine programme Midweek, presented by Libby Purves, for the last time after 30 years.
  - 10 April – Controller Gwyneth Williams announces that the arts programme Saturday Review will be axed in the Autumn as part of cost-cutting measures, instead, Front Row will get a Saturday highlights edition.
  - 27 July – The BBC reverses its decision to axe Saturday Review.
  - 27 December – Prince Harry guest edits The Today programme, on which is included guest interviews with former US President Barack Obama and the then-Prince Charles.
- 2018
  - April – Martha Kearney and Sarah Montague swap roles with Sarah leaving the Today programme after 17 years and Martha leaving The World at One after 11 years.
  - 8 August – Eddie Mair presents PM for the final time. He had presented the programme for the past 20 years.
- 2019
  - 28 June – Jonathan Dimbleby steps down as chair of Any Questions?, having presented the programme for nearly 32 years.
  - 5 July – Kirsty Young announces she is stepping down as presenter of Radio 4's Desert Island Discs. Lauren Laverne is announced as cover presenter for the foreseeable future.
  - August – Mohit Bakaya replaces Gwyneth Williams as station controller.
  - 19 September – John Humphrys presents his final edition of The Today programme after 32 years.
  - 18 October – BBC political correspondent Chris Mason takes over as presenter of Any Questions?.

== 2020s ==
- 2020
  - 30 January – Sarah Sands announces she is standing down as editor of Radio 4's The Today programme after three years in the post.
  - 30 April – The British Library is to archive hundreds of essays submitted to Radio 4's PM programme by listeners detailing their coronavirus experiences. The Covid Chronicles, launched in March, has seen listeners submit their accounts of their lives during the lockdown restrictions, some of which have been broadcast.
  - 1 June – An episode of Radio 4's The Infinite Monkey Cage becomes the first BBC programme recorded with a live audience at home.
  - 1 October – Dame Jenni Murray presents her final edition of Woman's Hour.
  - 31 December – Jane Garvey presents her final edition of Woman's Hour.
- 2021
  - 4 January – Emma Barnett takes over as presenter of Woman's Hour, presenting the programme on Monday to Thursday.
  - 15 January
    - Anita Rani joins Woman's Hour to present the programme's Friday and Saturday editions.
    - Radio 4 confirms Elizabeth Day and Johny Pitts as the new presenters of the Open Book programme, with Day making her debut on 17 January and Pitts making his debut on 31 January. They replace Mariella Frostrup who had presented the programme since 2003.
  - 9–11 April – Following the death of Prince Philip, Duke of Edinburgh, Radio 4 abandons half of its regular Friday, Saturday, and Sunday weekend programming in favour of simulcasting the BBC Radio News special programme and from 4pm, the station broadcasts a revised schedule for the rest of the day and over the weekend.
  - 17 May – Woman's Hour is extended from 45 minutes to a full hour.
  - 6 September – Sue Perkins takes over as the permanent host of Just a Minute.
- 2022
  - 26 May – BBC Director-General Tim Davie announces plans for an annual £500m of savings that will see the closure of Radio 5 Live's medium wave service, Radio 4's long wave service and Radio 4 Extra. There are also changes to local radio, with plans for shared content and the cancellation of some programmes that are not drawing a large enough audience.
  - 8–19 September – Following the death of Queen Elizabeth II, Radio 4 abandons some of its regular scheduled programming in favour of simulcasting a BBC Radio News special programme on the day of her death. The station broadcasts a revised schedule from 9 to 11 September. It would also broadcast a revised schedule on 19 September, which was the day of her state funeral.
  - 14 October – Andrea Catherwood succeeds Roger Bolton as presenter of Radio 4's Feedback.
- 2023
  - 30 May – The BBC announces its plans to switch off the station's long wave frequency sometime in 2024, and a campaign to migrate remaining long wave listeners to other outlets begins.
  - 31 July – Test Match Special is broadcast for the final time on Radio 4 long wave after 30 Summer seasons of cricket commentary on that frequency.
- 2024
  - 31 March – The final long wave opt-out ends after the 12:01 Shipping Forecast.
  - 1 April – The Daily Service is broadcast on Radio 4 Extra for the first time and Shipping Forecasts are reduced from four bulletins each day to two on weekdays and three at the weekend.
  - 15 April – Radio 4 switches off its medium wave frequencies. They had been used to provide reception on AM where the long wave signal was weak, such as in London, Northern Ireland and south west England. The frequencies broadcast a retune loop informing listeners to retune to other ways of reception.
  - 16 April – Yesterday in Parliament is broadcast on Radio 4 Extra for the first time. The change of station sees the programme move to a new post-9am slot.
  - 24 July – Radio 4 LW no longer shows up on BBC Sounds due to the schedule being the same as the output on FM.
- 2025
  - 24 March – Radio 4 expands its weekday broadcast hours and now begins broadcasting 20 minutes earlier, at 5am with a news bulletin replacing News Briefing. Yesterday In Parliament returns to Radio 4, airing at 05:04, and the Shipping Forecast moves to 05:34. Weekend programmes start at 5:30am.
- 2026
  - 1 January – Radio 4 celebrates the 75th anniversary of The Archers with a day of programmes and drama dedicated to the rural soap.
  - 17 June – The BBC announces that Radio 4 programmes such as The World Tonight, Midnight News, Money Box Live, The Law Show, AntiSocial and Crossing Continents will be cancelled by 2027 as part of a series of cuts to its news division.
  - 27 June – At 1am, Radio 4 stops broadcasting on long wave. A retune loop is broadcast for the next three days before the transmitter falls silent at just after 12noon.
  - 5 September – The Saturday edition of Today becomes solo anchored.
  - 12–16 October – Radio 4 will air a season of programmes under the banner "Winnie-the-Pooh at 100" to celebrate 100th anniversary of the A. A. Milne character, with programmes introduced by Queen Camilla.
  - By the end of the year, the Midnight News bulletin will end. It will be replaced by a short news summary and broadcasts of podcasts.
- 2027
  - April – The World Tonight will end and be replaced with a simulcast of BBC World Service’s Newshour.
