= Gwyneth Williams =

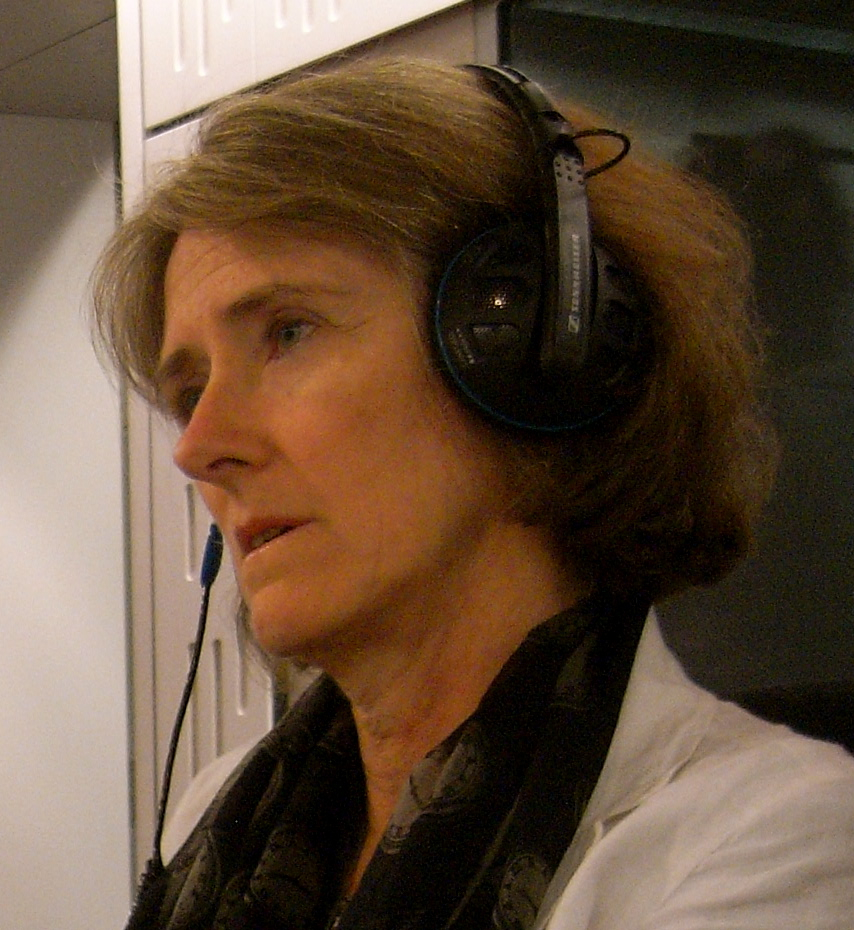
- Williams in 2011
- Born: 14 July 1953 (age 73); South Africa
- Education: St Hugh's College, Oxford
- Known for: Controller of BBC Radio 4 2010–2019

Gwyneth Williams OBE (born 14 July 1953) is a former controller of BBC Radio 4. She grew up in South Africa and attended St Hugh's College, Oxford.

== Earlier career ==
Williams joined the BBC World Service in 1976 as a trainee, having briefly worked as researcher at the Overseas Development Institute. In the 1980s she became producer and duty editor of BBC Radio 4's The World Tonight, and then Deputy Editor, Special Current Affairs Programmes, responsible for broadcasting general elections and other major events.

In 1994 as Editor, Policy and Social Programmes she launched current affairs programmes on BBC Radio 5 Live and then became Head of Radio Current Affairs and editor of the BBC Reith Lectures – responsible for the department that produced such programmes as File On 4, Analysis, From Our Own Correspondent, Crossing Continents, 5 Live Report, Money Box and In Business.

In 2007 she returned to the World Service as Director of English Networks and News, responsible for all of the service's English-language programming, until she was made redundant in 2010.

== BBC Radio 4 ==
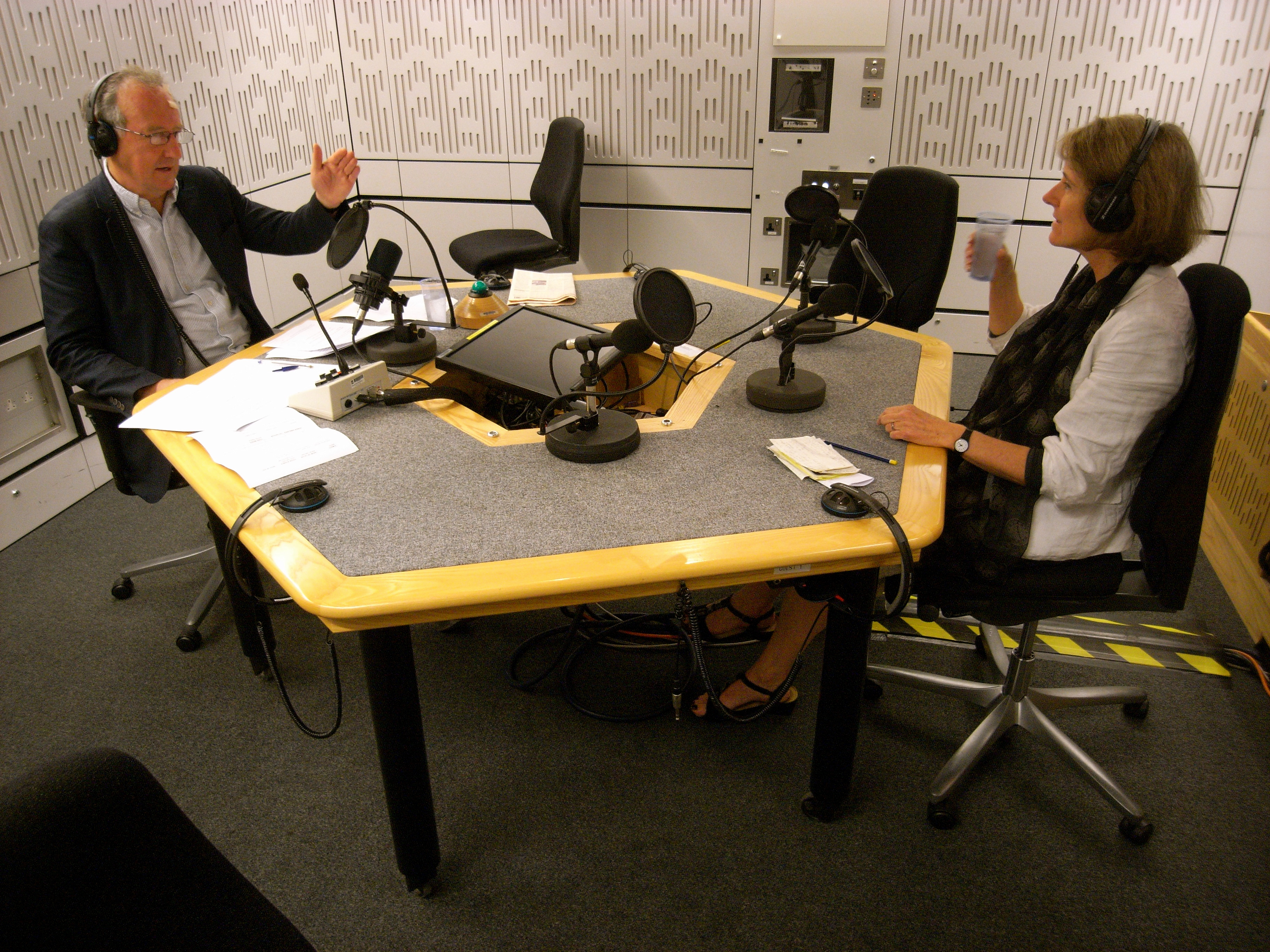
Roger Bolton interviewing Gwyneth Williams on Feedback (2011)

Williams took over from former Radio 4 controller Mark Damazer in September 2010. Her job includes responsibility for BBC Radio 4 Extra, which under her tenure has been rebranded from BBC Radio 7. Her salary was reported to be £175,000 - a 20% reduction on that of her predecessor. The BBC website states her salary to be £183,618.

On 18 November 2011, she was interviewed by Roger Bolton on the Radio 4 programme Feedback about the changes she had made to Radio 4. It was pointed out on the programme that she had caused the biggest changes to Radio 4 for ten years. The changes for which she was responsible included extending the length of The World at One to 45 minutes, and reducing the number of history programmes but increasing Radio 4's coverage of science.

In January 2019 it was announced that Williams was due to leave the corporation after 43 years.

She was appointed Officer of the Order of the British Empire (OBE) in the 2020 Birthday Honours for services to radio and broadcasting.
