= Live report =

Live report is an alternative name for a live broadcast.

Live Report may refer to:

- Live Report, a British band who came second in the 1989 Eurovision Song Contest
- Live Reports, a record label for a Zavoloka & Kotra release
- 5 Live Report, a BBC radio programme
- "Live Report", a track by Toby Fox from the soundtrack of the 2015 video game Undertale
