= Open Air =

British TV series (1986–90)

- Opening titles for Open Air.
- Genre: Discussion of television
- Developed by: BBC
- Country of origin: United Kingdom
- Original language: English
- No. of series: 4

Production
- Running time: 55 minutes

Original release
- Network: BBC1
- Release: 27 October 1986 – 18 May 1990

Related
- Right to Reply; Points of View

Open Air was BBC1's flagship programme for their new daytime service which began on 27 October 1986.

The programme was an on-air discussion forum for viewers to phone in their comments on the previous night's television. The series covered all television channels and would have programme makers and television management explaining their actions. Open Air also included features about current television and discussed all aspects of television. It also tried to answer viewers' questions. Unlike similar programmes Right to Reply and Points of View, Open Air was transmitted live each weekday morning.

== Broadcast ==
The programme was broadcast between September and May, initially between 11.35am and 12.20pm which, from 8 December 1986, included a five-minute break for a news summary at midday. For its second series, the programme moved to an uninterrupted 55-minute slot, airing between 11.05am and 12noon. September 1987 also saw the introduction of an additional 15-minute early morning episode, initially aired at 8.40am following the end of Breakfast Time, before moving to 9.05am from January 1988.

After four seasons, Open Air ended on 18 May 1990.

== Presenters ==
- Pattie Coldwell
- Eamonn Holmes
- Gloria Hunniford
- Jayne Irving
- John Mundy
- Mavis Nicholson
- Susan Rae
- Mike Shaft
- Bob Wellings
