= Mavis Nicholson =

Welsh writer and broadcaster (1930–2022)

- Born: Mavis Mainwaring; 19 October 1930; Briton Ferry, Glamorgan, Wales
- Died: 8 September 2022 (aged 91); Llansantffraid-ym-Mechain, Powys, Wales
- Education: Swansea University
- Occupations: Television and radio presenter, writer
- Television: Good Afternoon; After Noon; After Noon Plus; Mavis on 4 A Plus 4
- Spouse: Geoffrey Nicholson (m. 1952; died 1999)
- Children: 3

Mavis Nicholson (née Mainwaring; 19 October 1930 – 8 September 2022) was a Welsh radio and television broadcaster and writer. She was born in Wales, and worked throughout the United Kingdom.

== Early life ==
Nicholson was born on 19 October 1930 in Briton Ferry, Wales where she spent her childhood. Her father worked as a crane driver at the Port Talbot Steelworks in Aberavon. She attended Neath County School, leaving in 1949. She then studied English at Swansea University, although was unable to pass her final exams in English, forfeiting a degree. It was here that she met her husband, and both of them were tutored by the novelist Kingsley Amis.

In 1951, at the end of her undergraduate studies, Nicholson won a scholarship to train as an advertising copywriter and with this moved to London. There she and her husband were at the centre of a lively social circle, including their former tutor, Kingsley Amis, and the journalist and broadcaster John Morgan. According to Peter Corrigan's obituary of her husband, Mavis and Geoff Nicholson "became a much-loved double-act. Amis did not always approve of their views and claimed to have invented the word 'lefties' during one little set-to with them. While it was true that the Nicholsons didn't have dinner parties as such – they invited people for an argument and threw some food in – they were by no means belligerent but had in abundance the Welsh love of debate".

== Career ==
=== Early years ===
Nicholson stopped her work as an advertising copywriter when she had her children. Her second career as a broadcaster began in 1971 when, because of her probing and engaging conversational style at the dinner table, she was asked by Thames Television to host a programme on newly launched daytime television (British television had previously only started to broadcast in the late afternoon).

=== Broadcasting ===
Nicholson's screen debut occurred when she spoke out over a local dispute over school buses. The presenter of Thames TV News, Eamonn Andrews, told her she was a natural for the job. A year later, Nicholson had secured her first presenting job on the 1971–72 show Tea Break. By April 1972, this had become Good Afternoon, after which her TV career spanned the next 25 years. Nicholson then presented British television programmes such as After Noon, After Noon Plus and Mavis on 4 from the 1970s to 1990s, on which she interviewed people including Elizabeth Taylor, Kenneth Williams, Lilli Palmer, Kenny Everett, David Bowie, James Baldwin, J. G. Ballard, Peter Cook and Dudley Moore. Nicholson presented the Channel 4 programme A Plus 4, which ran from 1984 to 1986. In 1983, she presented the discussion series Predicaments, also a Thames production for Channel 4; she dismissed the view that the programme was "voyeuristic" as "middle-class queasiness". For the BBC, she appeared on Start the Week regularly in the 1970s, presented You and Yours in 1976 and hosted a number of interview and discussion series, including Open Air from 1988 to 1989 and Welsh editions of the Radio 2 Arts Programme in the 1990s.

In the 1980s, she and her husband returned to Wales to live in a farmhouse in Powys. In the early 1990s, she fronted a number of Channel 4 series produced by YoYo Films, such as Third Wave, In with Mavis, Moments of Crisis and Faces of the Family. She also presented the discussion show Right or Wrong, made by Central Television and taken by some other regions including Meridian. Her last work for television was Oldie TV in 1997, a television version of The Oldie magazine. However, in 2005, she returned to interview Elaine Morgan in an On Show programme for BBC One Wales, broadcast on 13 March that year. On 25 August 2016, BBC One Wales broadcast a profile called Being Mavis Nicholson: the Greatest TV Interviewer of All Time? in a peak 9 pm slot.

=== Other activities ===
After a sympathetic interview with Richard Ingrams, he was compelled to appoint her as resident agony aunt for his magazine The Oldie, for which she wrote until 2014. She was the author of the 1992 book Martha Jane & Me: A Girlhood In Wales.

Nicholson also presented radio shows, including a history of the department store and a look back at her childhood.

== Personal life and death ==
Nicholson married Geoffrey Nicholson in 1952. They met while studying at Swansea, and remained married until his death in 1999. Together, they had three sons.

Nicholson was a staunch supporter of the Labour Party.

Nicholson died from complications of dementia at a nursing home in Llansantffraid-ym-Mechain, on 8 September 2022, aged 91.
