= Death on the Rock =

- This Week episode
- Narrated by: Julian Manyon
- Presented by: Jonathan Dimbleby
- Editing by: Roger Bolton
- Original air date: 28 April 1988
- Running time: 44 minutes (without commercials)

"Death on the Rock" was a British television documentary broadcast in April 1988, part of Thames Television's current affairs series This Week. The programme examined the killing of three Provisional Irish Republican Army (IRA) members in Gibraltar in March 1988 by the British Special Air Service (SAS), codenamed "Operation Flavius". "Death on the Rock" presented evidence that the IRA members were shot without warning or with their hands up. It was condemned by the British government and denounced in the press as sensationalist. After one of its witnesses retracted his statement, "Death on the Rock" became the first individual documentary to be the subject of an independent inquiry, in which it was largely vindicated.

This Week began investigating the shootings after it emerged that IRA members were not armed or in possession of a bomb, as initially reported. The documentary was broadcast on ITV on 28 April 1988, despite two attempts by the government to have it postponed. Using eyewitness statements, the documentary questioned the government's version of events, and suggested that the three IRA members may have been unlawfully killed. It concluded by putting its findings to a human rights lawyer, who suggested the government should convene a judicial inquiry. Several newspapers attacked the documentary, accusing it of sensationalism and "trial by television". They mounted a campaign against Carmen Proetta, one of the documentary's witnesses, accusing her of being a former prostitute and of being anti-British; Proetta later successfully sued several newspapers for libel. Other newspapers accused "Death on the Rock" of misrepresenting the eyewitnesses' statements and criticised the Independent Broadcasting Authority (IBA) for allowing it to be broadcast.

Most of the programme's eyewitnesses repeated the statements to the inquest in Gibraltar, but one—who said he had seen a soldier stand over one of the IRA members and fire at the man while he was on the ground—retracted his evidence. As a result, Thames commissioned an independent inquiry—the first independent inquiry into an individual documentary. The Windlesham–Rampton report found that the programme sought to raise questions rather than to reach a conclusion. The authors made several criticisms of the documentary, but overall found it a "trenchant" work of journalism, made in "good faith and without ulterior motives". Thames lost its broadcasting rights and the IBA was abolished as a result of the Broadcasting Act 1990—decisions which several involved parties believed were influenced by the government's anger at "Death on the Rock".

== Background ==
=== This Week ===
This Week was a current affairs television series that began in 1956. In 1978, it was renamed TV Eye and took on a slightly lighter format; the title This Week was restored in 1986, after which it became steadily more journalistic. The programme was broadcast simultaneously across the ITV regions and became a mainstay of ITV's current affairs programming. By 1988, the programme had interviewed several prime ministers and leaders of the opposition, including Margaret Thatcher (the incumbent prime minister), who had been interviewed for three full episodes.

=== Gibraltar shootings ===
On 6 March 1988, three members of an IRA Active Service Unit—Daniel McCann, Mairead Farrell, and Sean Savage—were witnessed parking a car in a car park in Gibraltar; the car park was used as an assembly area for British soldiers preparing for the weekly "changing of the guard" ceremony outside the Convent (the residence of the governor of Gibraltar). The three were suspected by the British authorities of being part of a plot to detonate a car bomb in the car park while it was full of soldiers preparing for the ceremony; while the suspects were walking back towards the Spanish border, they were shot dead by British soldiers, members of the Special Air Service. In the immediate aftermath of the shootings, the British government released a statement to the effect that a large car bomb had been found in Gibraltar, and that three suspected terrorists had been shot dead by the Gibraltar Police. That evening, British television news reported the finding of the alleged car bomb, and added that the IRA members had been involved in a "shootout" with authorities. All of Britain's daily newspapers covered the shootings the following morning, several of which cited the size of the alleged car bomb as 500 pounds (230 kg) and wrote that it was "packed with shrapnel". The same morning, Ian Stewart, Minister of State for the Armed Forces, told BBC Radio 4 that "military personnel were involved" in the shootings, and that "a car bomb was found, which has been defused".

The following day, Sir Geoffrey Howe, the British foreign secretary, made a statement to the House of Commons regarding the shootings, in which he informed the house that the IRA members were unarmed, and that the car parked in the assembly area did not contain an explosive device. Howe stated that the IRA members "made movements which led the military personnel, operating in support of the Gibraltar Police, to conclude that their own lives and the lives of others were under threat". "In light of this response", Howe continued, "they were shot" by "military personnel, operating in support of the Gibraltar Police". Subsequent inquiries led to the discovery of a large quantity of explosives in Marbella (50 miles (80 km) from Gibraltar), along with detonators and timers.

== Investigation ==
This Week's editor, Roger Bolton, initially believed there was little merit in investigating the shootings. Based on the official account of events that was presented in the immediate aftermath of the shootings, Bolton believed that most people would think the IRA members "deserved what they got". Bolton's interest was piqued by Howe's statement, and the revelation in it that the deceased were unarmed and were not in possession of a bomb. Shortly afterwards, he dispatched two of This Week's journalists, Julian Manyon and Chris Oxley, to Gibraltar and Spain (respectively) to gather more information on the shootings. Bolton believed that the Milltown Cemetery attack and the corporals killings, two events in Belfast which resulted from the Gibraltar killings, provided "even more compelling reasons" to investigate the shootings; the team considered switching the focus of the programme to the effects the shootings had in Belfast, but decided to continue with the original project.

=== Gibraltar ===
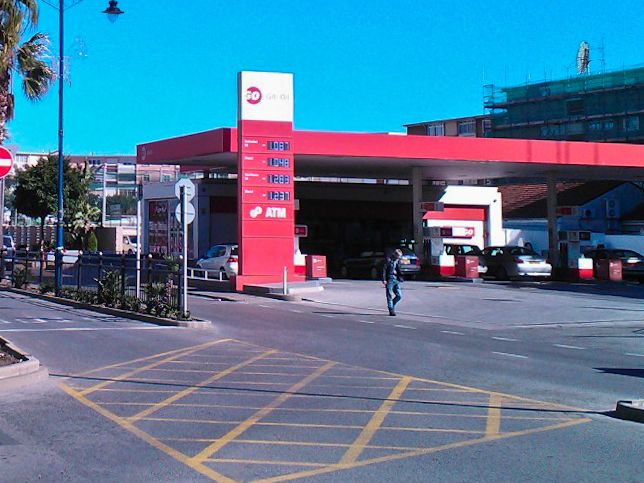
The petrol station on Winston Churchill Avenue where two of the three IRA members were shot

Oxley was surprised to learn that the Gibraltar Police were handling the police investigation into the shootings, having been closely involved in the events leading up to them. He grew concerned that the police investigation was insufficiently rigorous when he learned that the police had not taken statements from residents whose flats overlooked the scene of Farrell's and McCann's deaths. The Gibraltar coroner, Felix Pizzarello, welcomed This Week's investigation and hoped it would uncover witnesses who could assist the inquest. Manyon travelled to Madrid to learn more about the surveillance operation. Bolton added Alison Cahn to the team on 18 March; her task was to visit the flats which overlooked the scene of the shootings and interview any eyewitnesses. The team found two eyewitnesses who were willing to speak on camera—Stephen Bullock, a local lawyer who had witnessed the events while out for a walk with his wife, and Josie Celecia, a housewife who had seen the shooting of McCann and Savage from her apartment window. Both witnesses' statements appeared to be inconsistent with the official account of the shootings.

The journalists engaged Lieutenant Colonel George Styles, GC, as a ballistics expert. Styles was a retired British Army officer who had served as a bomb-disposal officer in Northern Ireland during the Troubles. He inspected the car park where Savage had parked the car, then walked through the town along what the journalists believed was the IRA members' most likely route. When asked his opinion by the journalists, Styles cast doubt on the authorities' stated reasons for the shootings. He explained that, had Savage's car contained a substantial bomb, the weight would have been evident on the vehicle's springs. Styles also felt that a potential bomb was unlikely to have been detonated with a remote detonator on account of the buildings between the scenes of the shootings and the likelihood that it would be drowned out by other radio signals in the area. Finally, the journalists asked Styles to examine the scenes of the shootings, including ricochet marks on the pumps at the petrol station where McCann and Farrell were shot.

As Styles was examining the ricochet marks, Cahn was approached by an elderly woman, who led her to a nearby apartment building. There, the woman introduced Cahn to her daughter—Carmen Proetta—who told Cahn that she had witnessed the shooting at the petrol station; although initially reluctant, she gave her account in an affidavit. Proetta asserted that, immediately before McCann and Farrell were shot, she saw a police car travelling north on Winston Churchill Avenue with its siren activated; as she watched, the police car stopped abruptly and four men—one uniformed police officer and three men in civilian clothes—jumped out. She stated that the plain-clothed men, all carrying pistols, leapt across the central reservation barrier, at which point she saw McCann and Farrell raise their hands. She believed the three men then opened fire, while McCann and Farrell had their hands in the air, and that neither made any movements towards their clothing or Farrell's handbag. One of the men then crouched over McCann and Farrell while they were on the ground, and continued to shoot them. Proetta's account of the shooting tallied with conclusions Styles drew from bullet marks at the petrol station. Styles also found her description of the bullets striking the bodies convincing, believing that only somebody who had witnessed a shooting would be able to describe it so vividly. Proetta's account of the soldiers arriving in a police car matched some of the newspaper reports from the day after the shootings.

Cahn traced two further witnesses to the shootings—Diana Treacy, who said she had seen the soldiers shooting Savage in the back without warning and continuing to shoot him while he was on the ground, and Kenneth Asquez, who had provided a hand-written, unsigned statement, but was extremely reluctant to be filmed or named as a witness. He had come to the attention of the journalists through another witness, who provided Cahn with a video recording of the aftermath of the shootings. The journalists approached the witness through a second intermediary and received a typed but unsigned affidavit. In both documents, Asquez stated that he had been a passenger in a car that was passing the scene of Savage's shooting; he described seeing Savage lying on the ground with a soldier standing over him, and witnessing the soldier shoot Savage "two or three times at point-blank range" while the latter was on the ground. The journalists failed to persuade Asquez to sign his affidavit, but decided to incorporate it into the programme nonetheless.

=== Spain ===
Julian Manyon met with a spokesman for the Spanish interior ministry, who confirmed that the Spanish authorities had tracked the three IRA members throughout their time in Spain. The Spanish surveillance operation included multiple cars following the suspects' vehicle, periodically "leap-frogging" each other to avoid attracting attention; use of a helicopter; constant radio communication between the officers involved and police headquarters; and officers monitoring the suspects' movements at fixed observation posts. The spokesman also told the men that the Spanish authorities kept the British government constantly apprised of the IRA team's movements, and that the British were aware of Savage's arrival at the Gibraltar border, and allowed the white Renault he was driving to enter the territory.

=== Northern Ireland ===
This Week conducted some of the filming for "Death on the Rock" in Northern Ireland, including the funeral of McCann, Savage, and Farrell. Manyon interviewed Gerry Adams, leader of Sinn Féin, who refused to confirm that the three were planning a bomb attack on Gibraltar. The team decided against using Adams' interview, and only 45 seconds of the footage was used in the final cut. The journalists were keen to show the potential impact of a bomb like the one the IRA had planned to explode in Gibraltar; they initially hoped to film a controlled explosion of a bomb of similar size, but no private contractor would conduct such an experiment without government approval. Instead, This Week interviewed Noreen Hill—whose husband was left in a coma as a result of a smaller bombing in Enniskillen in November 1987—to "depict the human tragedy of IRA bombings". (Note: They also filmed an interview with a second survivor of the Enniskillen bombing, which was not included in the final cut.)

== Conclusion ==
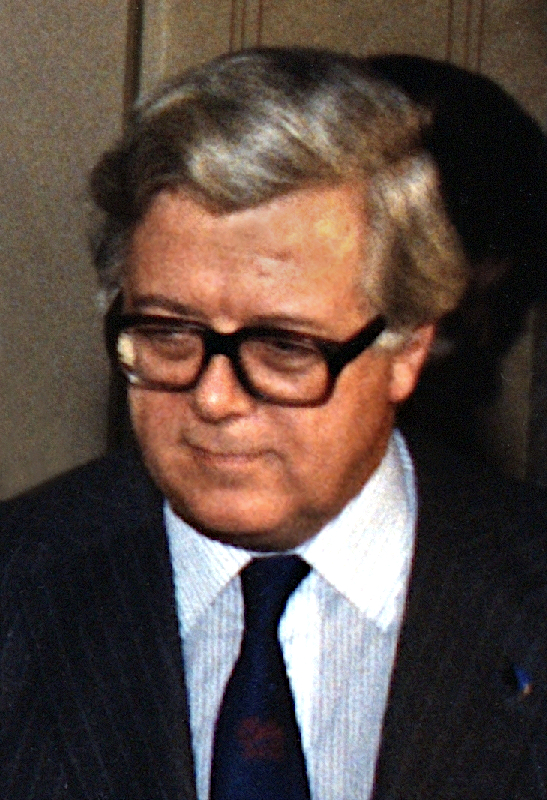
Sir Geoffrey Howe, then Foreign Secretary, twice attempted to have the programme postponed.

Bolton believed his team had enough to broadcast a documentary about the Gibraltar shootings. The journalists filmed those eyewitnesses who were willing to speak on camera. They also rented a helicopter and, with the assistance of the Spanish police, reconstructed the surveillance operation.

The authorities in Britain and Gibraltar refused to provide any information or to comment on the journalists' findings. Thus, This Week were unable to present their conclusions to a member of the government and broadcast their reaction, as was the usual practice for closing such a documentary. In place of such a conclusion, Bolton approached George Carman—a leading London lawyer specialising in human rights issues—who agreed to be interviewed for the programme. (Note: On 21 April, a week before the programme was due to be broadcast, Manyon met with a Ministry of Defence (MoD) spokesman and a British Army public relations officer, in a final, unsuccessful, attempt to include an official statement from the government.)

On 26 April, two days before "Death on the Rock" was due to air, the British government attempted to prevent its broadcast. Howe requested that Lord Thomson, chair of the Independent Broadcasting Authority (IBA), force a postponement on the grounds that Howe feared the documentary might prejudice the coroner's inquest. Thomson personally viewed "Death on the Rock" before making the final decision to permit its broadcast, with two alterations to the commentary. (Note: The IBA felt that the first version of the commentary suggested too strongly that the inquest would be inadequate and that the Gibraltar Police were unreliable; both concerns were addressed before the IBA approved the programme.) He later wrote that, "paradoxically", the decision "was not a difficult one. My colleagues and I saw no reason why the IBA should prevent Thames' journalists interviewing those who claimed to be eyewitnesses and investigating the affair as numerous other journalists had since the shootings, provided that the criminal record of the terrorists and the enormity of the outrage they planned was made clear and the legal position had been established to our satisfaction". With a slightly altered rationale—that the documentary could contaminate witness evidence at the inquest—Howe again attempted to prevent the programme's broadcast on the day it was due to be shown; after taking legal advice, the IBA upheld its decision to permit the broadcast.

== Broadcast ==
Final editing of the programme was still under way while the IBA was considering Howe's requests, causing Bolton to worry that it would not be completed in time. The editing was eventually finished just ten minutes before the documentary was due to air. "Death on the Rock" was ultimately broadcast in the United Kingdom on schedule, at 21:00 on 28 April 1988, six weeks after the shootings.

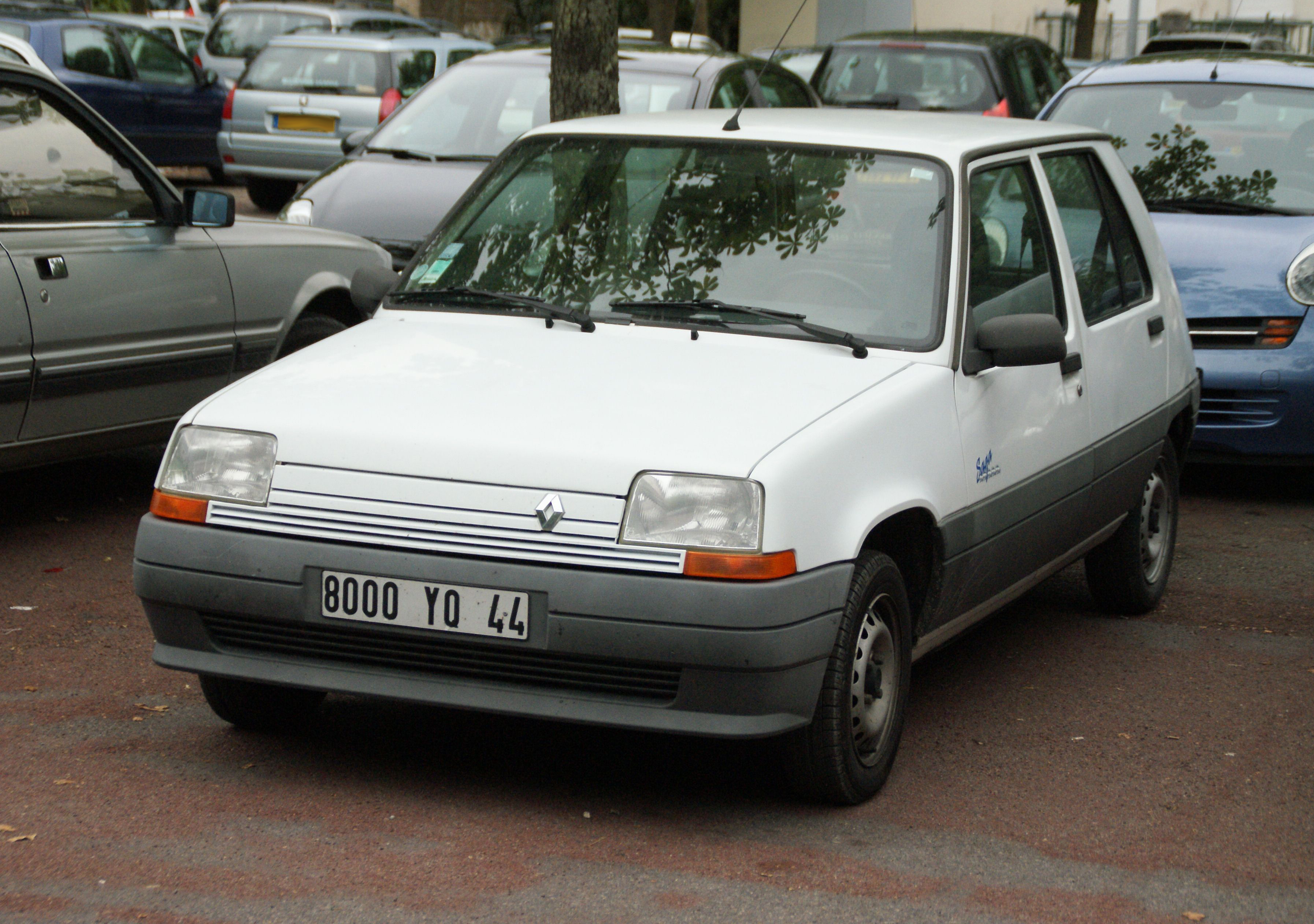
A white Renault 5, similar to that driven into Gibraltar by Sean Savage

The programme opened with excerpts from two of the interviews prior to the title sequence, followed by an introduction from Jonathan Dimbleby, who told viewers that the evidence presented in the programme was "of critical importance for those who wish to find out what really happened in Gibraltar last month". The commentary cut to Manyon, who introduced Styles and discussed the impact the IRA's bomb would have had, and then to Noreen Hill, whose husband was in a coma as a result of the Enniskillen bombing. Manyon pointed out that the IRA expressed regret after Enniskillen, but that they were by then already planning to attack Gibraltar. Manyon told viewers of the three IRA members' backgrounds, before introducing an interview with an official from the Spanish Interior Ministry, who discussed the surveillance operation, of which viewers were shown the reconstruction with a voice-over from Manyon. The programme reconstructed Savage's movements as he crossed the border into Gibraltar, parked his car in the assembly area for the ceremony and met up with McCann and Farrell, after which it broadcast part of Howe's statement to the House of Commons: "Their presence and actions near the parked Renault car gave rise to strong suspicion that it contained a bomb, which appeared to be corroborated by a rapid technical examination of the car". Manyon explained that the vehicle was later found not to contain a bomb, and introduced Styles, who believed that such an examination would have shown that the car did not contain a bomb, as the weight would have been evident on the vehicle's springs.

Manyon continued to narrate as the programme reconstructed the IRA team's movements through Gibraltar towards the border until McCann and Farrell reached a petrol station on Winston Churchill Avenue. "Then, suddenly", Manyon told viewers, "shots rang out, and in less than a minute all three terrorists were dead—shot by the SAS". The commentary again cut to Howe's statement, after which Manyon detailed This Week's investigation. He introduced the four eyewitnesses the journalists had discovered (Diana Treacy, Josie Celecia, Stephen Bullock, and Carmen Proetta). Celecia described witnessing McCann and Farrell walking along Winston Churchill Avenue before hearing several shots, and then seeing a soldier continue to fire at the pair while they were on the ground. Proetta told the programme she saw a police car arrive opposite the petrol station, that three armed men in plain clothes then disembarked, jumped across the central barrier, and shot McCann and Farrell while the latter had their hands up. Bullock was interviewed walking the route he had walked on the day of the shootings; his account was of two men in plain clothes shooting McCann and Farrell at very close range and continuing to shoot as the pair fell and while they were on the ground. Treacy, meanwhile, was walking along Landport Lane when Savage ran past her, pursued by at least one soldier. She stated that she did not hear any warning before Savage was shot; she ran away after the shooting began. Asquez was not named in the broadcast; his statement—that he saw a soldier firing at Savage while the latter was on the ground—was read out by an actor.

Styles told Manyon he believed it unlikely that the IRA would have succeeded in detonating a bomb in the assembly area from the petrol station where McCann and Farrell were shot (a distance of approximately 1.5 miles (2.4 km)). Returning to Proetta, the documentary heard her reaction to Howe's statement that McCann and Farrell made threatening movements; Proetta believed that the incident was triggered by the siren from the police car on Winston Churchill Avenue. She believed that any movements McCann and Farrell made were in response to the siren, and was adamant that the pair had their hands up when they were shot. Manyon summed up the programme's findings:

- no independent witnesses heard a challenge,
- Proetta believed McCann and Farrell were shot with their hands up,
- Treacy saw Savage shot in the back,
- two witnesses claimed to have seen the IRA members "finished off" on the ground,
- Styles believed the authorities should have known the car did not contain a bomb.

Carman, the QC recruited by Bolton, was the last contributor to the documentary. Presented with This Week's evidence, he disagreed with Margaret Thatcher's statement that the inquest would be sufficient to establish the facts of the incident. He opined that a more powerful judicial enquiry, possibly headed by a British High Court judge, would be better equipped to eliminate the inconsistencies between the official version of events and the eyewitness statements. In conclusion, Manyon asked Carman "do you believe this case is so important that the government should take such extraordinary steps in order to clarify the facts?" Carman responded "the programme indicates there are serious, important public issues involved, and speaking as a lawyer, one is always anxious when there is contest on the facts in such important areas, they should be properly and efficiently investigated". The documentary closed with Jonathan Dimbleby:

That report was made, as you may have detected, without the cooperation of the British government, which says it will make no comment until the inquest.

As our film contained much new evidence hitherto unavailable to the coroner, we are sending the transcripts to his court in Gibraltar, where it's been made clear to us that all such evidence is welcomed.

From This Week, goodnight.

== Reaction ==
The controversy surrounding "Death on the Rock" was "unsurpassed" in Lord Thomson's experience. The morning after the broadcast, the British broadsheets appeared open-minded or moderately favourable to This Week; The Times believed that "Death on the Rock" "seemed a significant, thoroughly responsible and serious examination of a most disturbing case" and that it "simply raised serious questions and suggested they needed deep examination". The tabloids berated the programme and its makers. The Daily Mail's main headline read "fury over SAS 'trial by TV'", while in an inside article, it called the programme "woefully one-sided", and accused Bolton of having previously collaborated with the IRA for sensational news stories. Bolton later successfully sued the Mail for libel. That evening, Bolton agreed to appear on Channel 4's Right to Reply, a show which allowed ordinary viewers to question the makers of controversial television programmes; the programme was pre-recorded, and, unusually, the producers agreed to cut the end of the recording after one of the participants—a former member of Margaret Thatcher's personal staff claiming to be an impartial viewer—launched an attack on Bolton, in which he accused Bolton of associating with terrorists.

The British tabloid press mounted a campaign against Proetta. The day after the broadcast, the London Evening Standard printed a story about Proetta's husband; the piece—citing the Gibraltar Police press officer—stated that he was a drug smuggler well known to the police. Over the course of the week, several of the tabloids ran stories alleging that Carmen Proetta ran an escort agency and that she was a former prostitute with a criminal record. Several stories also attempted to portray Proetta as anti-British, including one in the broadsheet The Daily Telegraph which said she was one of the 44 people who voted to end the British administration in Gibraltar's 1967 referendum. In fact, Proetta had served briefly as a director of a Spanish tour company and had no criminal record in either Spain or Gibraltar; her husband had been convicted for drug possession in Spain and was, at the time of the shootings, facing separate charges for allowing his boat to be used by drug smugglers. Proetta later sued The Sun and other newspapers for libel and won substantial damages.

The Sunday Times attempted to undermine the programme's credibility with its own investigative journalism. Citing "official sources", the paper told its readers that This Week's account of the shootings was "crucially flawed", and "bore no resemblance to what happened". It stated that several of the programme's witnesses felt that "Death on the Rock" had misrepresented their statements. Styles was said to be aggrieved that two of his "key opinions" had been omitted from the version broadcast—specifically that what Proetta interpreted as a gesture of surrender may have been an involuntary reaction to the bullets striking the suspects' bodies, and that the IRA members could still have detonated a bomb in another vehicle parked on the Spanish side of the border. The latter opinion was omitted because the This Week team saw little for the IRA to gain by detonating a bomb on Spanish soil; the former was included in the broadcast. Celecia, it alleged, had dismissed Proetta's account as "ridiculous", while Stephen Bullock had contradicted Proetta's statement that she had seen plain-clothed soldiers arriving in a police car—testimony The Sunday Times believed "destroyed" Proetta's evidence. Both witnesses refuted these claims in letters to other newspapers. Bullock had dismissed only one detail in Proetta's evidence, while he and Proetta had been referring to two distinct police cars in their statements. (Note: Bullock did observe one inaccuracy in "Death on the Rock": that he was reported as saying he had not heard the soldiers shout a warning to McCann and Farrell, when he was in no position to hear whether such a warning was given or not.) The Sunday Times omitted Styles' belief that the shootings were a pre-emptive attack. Styles' view was one of "two active service units waging war [...] taking [the IRA members] out quickly, cleanly, and without other people being hurt (Note: Styles was apparently unaware that one passer-by was grazed by a ricocheting bullet.)—that seems to be the only way". (Note: Three Sunday Times journalists later wrote letters to other publications to complain that their copy was distorted by sub-editors.) Several newspapers were critical of the IBA's decision to allow the documentary to be broadcast.

== Inquest ==
The programme's eyewitnesses appeared at the inquest, which began on 6 September. One of the first civilians to give evidence was Allen Feraday, an explosives expert who worked for the Ministry of Defence (MoD); he confirmed Styles' contribution to the documentary—that the IRA had not been known to use a remote-detonated bomb without a direct line of sight to their target. The various expert witnesses at the inquest disagreed as to whether a detonation signal could have reached the parked Renault from the scenes of the shootings. Four eyewitnesses gave evidence which broadly supported the official version of events; in particular, none saw the soldiers shoot McCann, Savage, or Farrell while they were on the ground. When the witnesses from "Death on the Rock" were called, Stephen Bullock told the coroner that he saw McCann and Savage raise their hands before seeing the SAS shoot them at point-blank range. Josie Celecia's statement that she saw a soldier shooting at McCann and Farrell while the pair were on the ground was challenged by government lawyers, who pointed out that her account had changed since "Death on the Rock" and that she was unable to identify the soldiers from photographs taken by her husband. (Note: Douglas Celecia handed his photographs to the Gibraltar Police. After the inquest, his request for their return was declined; he eventually recovered them after legal action against the Gibraltar Police, which was funded by Thames Television.)

Maxie Proetta told the coroner that he had witnessed four men (three in plain clothes and one uniformed Gibraltar Police officer) arriving opposite the petrol station on Winston Churchill Avenue; the men jumped over the central reservation barrier and Farrell put her hands up, after which he heard a series of shots. In contrast to his wife's testimony, he believed that Farrell's gesture was one of self-defence rather than surrender, and he believed that the shots he heard did not come from the men from the police car. The government lawyers suggested that the police car he and his wife had seen was one seen by other eyewitnesses further south, and that it was responding to the shootings but Proetta replied that the lawyers' suggestion did not make sense. Carmen Proetta's testimony the following day contained some discrepancies with the evidence she gave to "Death on the Rock". She was no longer certain that she had seen the SAS shoot McCann and Savage while the latter were on the ground, because she could not recall seeing shell casings being ejected from the soldiers' weapons. The government lawyers questioned the reliability of Proetta's evidence based on her changes, and implied that she behaved suspiciously by giving evidence to "Death on the Rock" before the police. She responded that the police had not spoken to her about the shootings until after "Death on the Rock" had been shown. When Asquez reluctantly appeared, he retracted the statements he had given to the journalists, which he said he had made up after "pestering" from Major Bob Randall (who had sold the programme a video recording of the aftermath of the shootings). (Note: Randall was on holiday abroad at the time of the inquest, having been advised by the Gibraltar Police that he would not be needed. Upon his return, he denied putting any pressure on Asquez.) The British tabloids covered Asquez's retraction extensively, while several members of parliament accused "Death on the Rock" of manipulating Asquez in an attempt to discredit the SAS and the British government. However, Asquez's statement contained several details that were not released publicly, and which only entered the public domain during the inquest, though, when questioned by the coroner, Asquez said he could not explain the discrepancy because he was "a bit confused". The inquest concluded on 30 September and the jury returned a verdict of lawful killing.

Following the inquest, the families of McCann, Savage, and Farrell applied to the European Commission of Human Rights for an opinion on whether the authorities' actions in Gibraltar violated Article 2 (the "right to life") of the European Convention on Human Rights (ECHR); This Week's journalists provided statements to the commission regarding the Spanish surveillance operation (the existence of which had been denied by the British authorities at the inquest). The commission's report found no violation of Article 2, but referred the case to the European Court of Human Rights (ECtHR) for a final decision. The court rejected the families' submission that the British government had conspired to kill the three, but did find a violation of Article 2 in the defective planning and control of the operation. Nevertheless, the applicants' claim for damages was dismissed on the grounds that the trio had been killed while preparing an act of terrorism, though it did order the government to pay the applicants' costs.

== Windlesham–Rampton Report ==
Following Asquez's retraction of his statement and his allegation that he was pressured into giving a false account of the events he witnessed, the IBA contacted Thames to express its concern and to raise the possibility of an investigation into the making of the documentary. Thames eventually agreed to commission an independent inquiry into the programme (the first such inquiry into an individual programme), to be conducted by two people with no connection to either Thames or the IBA; to that end, Thames engaged Lord Windlesham and Richard Rampton, QC. Windlesham was a Conservative politician, privy councillor, and former minister in the Home Office and then the Northern Ireland Office; he also had experience of television journalism, having previously managed two television companies. Rampton was a leading barrister specialising in media law and libel. The inquiry's terms of reference were "to inquire into the making and screening of 'Death on the Rock'", including its creation, production, content, and any effect it had had on the inquest.

The report found that the tendency of the evidence presented in the programme was to suggest the terrorists had been unlawfully killed, and that it did not explore alternative explanations in any depth. Nevertheless, Windlesham and Rampton believed that the programme presented evidence for one possible explanation, but sought to raise questions rather than reach a conclusion. In analysing the content of the programme, they found that it allowed the witnesses to give their accounts in their own words rather than presenting them as established fact. Thus, they found that the content did not infringe any requirement for neutrality. The report scrutinised in detail the statements of the eyewitnesses who spoke on camera, including the parts of the interviews that were not included in the broadcast version of the programme. It found, with two exceptions, that the witnesses' statements were fairly represented in the programme. The exceptions were that the programme suggested that Bullock had not heard a warning, when he was in no position to hear whether such a warning was given or not; and that the commentary implied that all four witnesses who appeared on the programme had seen no threatening movements from the IRA members, when only two had been asked whether they witnessed such movements. Windlesham and Rampton also considered Asquez's statement and the journalists' decision to incorporate it into the programme. The report considered that the journalists acted reasonably in using the statement, despite Asquez's refusal to sign it, on the grounds that Asquez had given two separate, near-identical statements (including one to a lawyer), and that they considered it unlikely that somebody would invent such a dramatic account. Nonetheless, the report criticised the programme for not informing viewers of Asquez's refusal to sign the statement.

The Foreign and Commonwealth Office (FCO) made representations to the inquiry that "Death on the Rock" could potentially have had an adverse effect on the inquest on the same grounds that Howe had attempted to delay the broadcast. The first was that the programme might have been seen by members of the inquest jury, and could thus have caused them to reach a conclusion on the shootings before hearing the evidence at the inquest. Considering this submission, the report agreed with the opinions of lawyers consulted by Thames and the IBA that "Death on the Rock" was safe to be broadcast on 28 April 1988. The report considered that Thames withheld distribution of "Death on the Rock" from Gibraltar and Spain specifically to address such concerns, though it was widely discussed in British newspapers (which are widely sold in the territory) and extracts later became available in Gibraltar. The report concluded it was foreseeable that the content of "Death on the Rock" would become known in Gibraltar, but that it would not have prejudiced potential jurors as, in the authors' opinion, the programme raised one possibility, but did not seek to present it as the only possible version of events. The second was that the programme might have contaminated the evidence presented at the inquest, as witnesses might have been tempted to give false or embellished accounts for the television. The report dismissed this concern; the authors believed that all the eyewitnesses gave honest accounts of what they believed they saw, and pointed out that three had given statements to the Gibraltar Police and two had been interviewed by Gibraltarian and British newspapers prior to being interviewed for "Death on the Rock".

Overall, Windlesham and Rampton found "Death on the Rock" to be a "trenchant" work of journalism, made in "good faith and without ulterior motives". In conclusion, the authors believed that "Death on the Rock" proved that "freedom of expression can prevail in the most extensive, and the most immediate, of all the means of mass communication".

The terms of reference of the report did not invite any recommendations, nor did the authors offer any.

== Impact ==
"Death on the Rock" was highly praised within the television industry and went on to win the BAFTA Award for Best Documentary and an award from the Broadcasting Press Guild. In 2000, Death on the Rock was placed 92nd by industry professionals in a list of the 100 Greatest British Television Programmes compiled by the British Film Institute.

Two other programmes were made about the Gibraltar shootings for British television, both by the BBC. BBC Northern Ireland produced an episode of Spotlight which arrived at similar findings to those of This Week; Howe attempted to have the programme delayed, using the same rationale with which he requested "Death on the Rock" be postponed. The programme was eventually broadcast, but restricted to Northern Ireland. The BBC's flagship current affairs series Panorama made a programme about the SAS and its role in the Troubles to coincide with the end of the Gibraltar inquest; it was postponed by BBC executives in the wake of the controversy surrounding "Death on the Rock".

Academic Christian Potschka described "Death on the Rock" as part of a decade of "unprecedented conflict between government and broadcasters over ... investigative documentaries". Margaret Thatcher "utterly rejected" the findings of the Windlesham–Rampton report. After the reforms brought in by the Broadcasting Act 1990, the process of bidding for ITV franchises was overhauled in an attempt to introduce greater competition. In the subsequent auction, Thames Television lost its contract; several journalists and former Thames employees speculated that the Act was the government's revenge for "Death on the Rock". This Week ceased after Thames lost its franchise. Lord Thomson, chairman of the IBA, believed the dispute between the government and the authority had a "very substantial influence on Mrs Thatcher's attitude towards broadcasting policy", which led her to the belief that Thames' franchise should not be renewed. The 1990 Act abolished the IBA, which Thomson believed was directly related to the authority's decision to permit the showing of "Death on the Rock".

It was broadcast again in April 1991 as part of the Channel 4 Banned season.
