= Mike Shaft =

UK radio presenter

- Born: Grenada
- Presenting career
- Country: United Kingdom
- Website: www.bbc.co.uk/programmes/p001d73y

Mike Shaft is a UK based radio presenter, who has been active in British broadcasting for over forty years. During his career Shaft has presented programmes for Piccadilly Radio, Jazz FM, BBC Radio Manchester and Mike Shaft's Music and Radio Office. He also has enjoyed a stint on television where he was a presenter on the BBC daytime Open Air programme.

In 2017 Shaft's Radio Manchester show won the national, Jerusalem Award – recognised as "a delightful presentational style and truly fitting of the great city from which it comes….willing to ask any question and to leave questions open, this is 21st century religious broadcasting".

== Career ==
Shaft was born in Grenada and moved to the UK in 1968. He currently resides in Manchester.

Shaft began his broadcasting career in 1978 when he joined Piccadilly Radio on a freelance basis and in 1980 he was given his own weekly programme. In 1987 he left Piccadilly and joined BBC Radio Manchester as a presenter of the weekly soul music show, it was during his first stint on Radio Manchester that Mike was offered a presenting job on television, he was one of the presenters for Open Air and was a co-presenter for two series. Soon after he began presenting episodes of Open Air, Shaft fulfilled the position of the Drivetime show on Radio Manchester.

In 1989 he left Radio Manchester in order to set up Sunset Radio, where he became Managing Director and Programme Controller. The station proved popular with listeners, but Shaft left the station in 1990 due to disagreement with some members of the Board about the direction that the station was taking. Following his resignation Shaft began working for various radio stations across the North West of England, these included Marcher Sound, Piccadilly Gold, Piccadilly Key 103 and Wear FM. During this time, Mike also co-presented a television series for Central Television called One World. In 1990 Shaft also appeared as a radio host in Coronation Street, interviewing Alec and Bet Gilroy at the Rover's Return.

Shaft returned to frontline broadcasting in 1993 when he presented the mid-morning programme on The Bay, during his stint he was also head of promotion for The Bay. In 1996 he left The Bay in order to work for Jazz FM and The Christian Broadcasting station Reach FM in Bolton. Additionally Shaft returned to Piccadilly Radio in 1993, where he became Head of Music and also fronted the late night show Takin’ care of business for seven years, which featured briefly in the first episode of Cold Feet's fourth series.

On television Shaft was Sky Television's basketball commentator during the mid-1990s, he has presented programmes for The Christian Channel and regularly contributed to BBC Breakfast.

He later presented the Sunday morning breakfast show on BBC Radio Manchester, hosting his final programme on 27 March 2022.
