= Kenny Richey =

British-US dual citizen (born 1964)

Kenneth Thomas Richey (born August 3, 1964) is a British-US dual citizen who in 1987 was convicted in Ohio of murdering a two-year-old girl and sentenced to death. He spent 21 years on death row before re-examination of his case led to his release, after he accepted a plea bargain in which he pleaded no contest to manslaughter.

== Early life ==
Richey was born in the Netherlands to a Scottish mother and an American father. He was raised in Edinburgh, Scotland but moved to Ohio to join his father in late 1982. He served in the United States Marine Corps before moving into government-subsidized housing in Columbus Grove. In 1986, Richey's younger brother Tom shot two people in Washington State during an LSD trip, which resulted in the death of a shop assistant, and was eventually sentenced to 65 years in prison.

== Murder conviction and imprisonment ==
On June 30, 1986, a fire broke out at the Old Farm Village Apartments complex in which Richey lived at 4:15am. The fire originated in an apartment where 21-year-old Hope Collins lived with her two-year-old daughter, Cynthia; Cynthia died of smoke inhalation. Richey had allegedly earlier offered to babysit Cynthia for Collins in the apartment so she could go out on a date, however Richey would later claim that he refused to look after her when asked by Collins and instead went to his father's apartment to sleep off the effects of prescription drugs and alcohol. Prosecutors argued that Richey started the fire and was targeting his ex-girlfriend, Candy Barchet, who lived in the same apartment complex. Richey had earlier attended a party at the apartment next door to Collins where he, Barchet and her new boyfriend attended, and was allegedly heard to say Barchet's building "was going to burn" that night by three separate witnesses.

Richey was convicted in January 1987 of aggravated murder by arson. During the trial, he twice rejected plea-bargains which would have avoided the death penalty if he had admitted setting the fire deliberately.At his sentencing hearing, evidence was presented regarding Richey's history of mental health problems; a psychologist and social worker testified that Richey had borderline personality disorder, antisocial personality disorder, and histrionic behavior disorder. In a separate case, Hope Collins pleaded guilty to the involuntary manslaughter of her daughter and served 45 days in prison.

Richey spent the next 21 years on death row, serving time in both Southern Ohio Correctional Facility and Mansfield Correctional Institution. In 1993, he was one hour away from being executed via the electric chair when a last-minute reprieve halted proceedings.

== Release ==
During his 20-year incarceration, doubts arose about the circumstantial evidence that led to conviction, particularly the forensic evidence. This led to a campaign to re-examine the evidence. Amnesty International described the case as, "one of the most compelling cases of apparent innocence that human rights campaigners have ever seen." In 1997, two witnesses who had previously testified that Richey had threatened to set fire to his ex-girlfriend's apartment retracted their original statements.

Richey's lawyers filed a series of appeals that disputed the prosecution's evidence at his original trial. Inconsistencies in the circumstantial evidence used to convict him were also highlighted, such as despite the fact he was supposed to have used gasoline and paint thinners as accerants in the fire, no traces of these substances were found on the clothes or boots he was wearing at the time of his arrest the following morning. Witnesses also came forward to testify that Cynthia Collins was obsessed with matches and had started several accidental fires beforehand, while her mother often disconnected the apartments' smoke detector while cooking (rather than Richey disabling it with intent). Richey himself also highlighted how he had a broken right hand in a plaster cast on the night in question, and the impossibility of him being able to carry two cans of accelerant up onto a roof while being heavily intoxicated on drugs and alcohol, before setting the fire and disposing of all the evidence without being seen by any eyewitnesses.

In December 2007, Richey accepted a plea bargain, which led to his release from death row and return to Scotland on January 9, 2008. Richey's plea bargain involved pleading 'no contest' to manslaughter, child endangering and breaking and entering. He was sentenced to time served, with the murder and arson charges dropped. A 'no contest' plea is not an admission of guilt. The accused, by entering a no contest plea, neither disputes nor admits to the charges.

== Life after prison ==
Richey was granted British citizenship in 2003, becoming the first to benefit from a change in British nationality law regarding the status of children of British mothers and non-British fathers born outside the United Kingdom.

=== 2010 imprisonment ===
After returning to the United States in 2010, Richey was arrested in Mississippi and charged in Ohio with phoning in threatening messages to Judge Randall Basinger (who was assistant county prosecutor at the time of Richey's 1987 murder trial). Despite Richey's claim that the threats were merely a drunken prank, Visiting Judge Dale Crawford found Richey guilty and sentenced him to three years in prison. Richey was released after two years and spent some time working with the American charity Sanctuary Quarters, which builds houses for homeless veterans.

=== 2020 imprisonment ===
In October 2019 Richey was arrested in Columbus, Ohio after posting a video threatening Judge Randall Basinger, his children, and his grandchildren. In July 2020 he was convicted of making threats and sentenced to 12 years in prison. He is currently housed at Allen-Oakwood Correctional Institution in Lima, Ohio.

== In popular culture ==
A 1992 documentary from This Week entitled "The Brit on Death Row" and a 1998 documentary from World in Action entitled "A Date with the Executioner", were both made about Richey and the campaign for his release from the death sentence.

== See also ==
- Krishna Maharaj, another British national who fought a murder conviction in the United States
