= Denis Tuohy =

Irish broadcaster

Denis Tuohy (born 2 April 1937) is a Northern Irish television broadcaster, newsreader, journalist and actor.

Tuohy was born on 2 April 1937 in Belfast. He attended Queen's University Belfast, where he learned to debate and acquired an interest in acting. In 1960, he appeared in Over the Bridge, a play written by Sam Thompson and directed by Jimmy Ellis. Later that year, Tuohy became the first Catholic broadcaster for BBC Northern Ireland.

Tuohy moved to London in 1964 to work for the new BBC2. At the channel's launch that April, he was scheduled to be the first face on air. However, there was a power failure on the opening night and newsreader Gerald Priestland was briefly seen before the transmission was aborted and the official launch postponed until the day after. The opening broadcast began with a shot of a burning candle and Tuohy then blowing it out.

Tuohy participated in several of the BBC's current affairs programmes of the 1970s, including Tonight and the long-running Panorama. After moving to Thames Television, he was a reporter and presenter for This Week (and TV Eye, 1978–1986). He interviewed Margaret Thatcher in the lead-up to the 1979 general election. Communication specialist Geoffrey Beattie analysed the interview extensively in a work on patterns of interruption in conversation. During the 1990s, Tuohy was a newscaster for ITN, usually anchoring overnight bulletins and the ITV Morning News, and also worked on several documentaries.

On returning to live in Ireland in 2001, Tuohy took up acting again, playing roles in RTE's Fair City, The Clinic and Fallout and BBC NI's Betrayal of Trust. He also wrote a memoir, Wide-Eyed in Medialand: A Broadcaster's Journey. As a broadcaster, he has written and presented over twenty documentaries for UTV, particularly The Troubles I've Seen. He has made many contributions to BBC Radio Ulster's Thought for the Day. A collection of these, Streets and Secret Places, was published in 2021.

== Notes ==
- Tuohy, Dennis (5 September 2018). "Belfast-born TV journalist Denis Tuohy recalls how he was banned by BBC from reporting civil rights movement in Northern Ireland". Belfast Telegraph.
- Jones, Francis (16 August 2005). "Denis Tuohy". Culture Northern Ireland. Archived from the original on 12 April 2019.
- "Attenborough 'turned down Wogan' for job". BBC. 9 February 2016.
- Hailes, Anne (6 June 2016). "Denis Tuohy: 'Career highlight was my Muhammad Ali chat'". The Irish News.
- Bakewell, Joan (20 April 2014). "Joan Bakewell: 'David Attenborough called us his programme guerillas'". The Telegraph.
- "Memories of the Troubles". Belfast Newsletter. 24 March 2008.
- Tuohy, Denis (30 November 2017). "Denis Tuohy: The day I came face to face with Charles Manson's killer cult in a remote mountain ranch". Belfast Telegraph.
- Collins, Liam (27 November 2005). "The journo who never grew up tells his life story". Sunday Independent.
- Bull, Peter (2003). The Microanalysis of Political Communication: Claptrap and Ambiguity. Routledge. ISBN 9781134480524.
