= Roger Bolton (broadcaster) =

British TV producer and TV and radio presenter

Roger John Bolton (born 13 November 1945) is a British television producer and TV and radio presenter.

== Early life ==
After attending Carlisle Grammar School and the University of Liverpool he joined the BBC as a trainee in 1967.

== Broadcasting ==
=== Television ===
He has worked on television as an editor of Tonight in 1978, Panorama in 1979 and Nationwide in 1981. After Nationwide's run ended in 1983 he became Head of Network Production for the BBC at its Manchester studios. After nearly two decades at the BBC he joined Thames as editor of This Week from 1986 and was involved with the controversial documentary "Death on the Rock" in April 1988. Even though he nearly lost his job due to "Death on the Rock", he was kept on by Thames TV and was promoted to be Controller of Factual Programmes in 1989. This job ended when Thames lost its franchise in 1992. After this he set up his own eponymous production company in 1993, and co-founded the Flame Group with Barbara Altounyan in 2001.

In the 1990s, he also fronted the series Right to Reply for the last six years of its run. This was a Feedback-style television programme for Channel 4, which like the BBC's Points of View, dealt with viewers complaints to the channel and tried to get a response from the network's bosses.

=== Radio ===
As a radio presenter on BBC Radio 4, he is chiefly known for his work on Feedback, which he presented for 23 years, and Sunday which he regularly presented from 1998 until January 2010.

Bolton was removed as presenter of Feedback in August 2022 by the BBC, which thanked him for his service but did not provide a reason for the change, and said it would be seeking a new presenter and production company for the programme. Bolton said "I'd have liked to have continued", and his removal was met with criticism from politicians and journalists. Following his departure he launched a podcast, Roger Bolton's Beeb Watch, with a former BBC colleague and focuses on public service broadcasting generally with a focus on the BBC in particular.

== Personal life ==
He married Julia Helen McLaren in July 1987 in Hammersmith. They have two daughters and live in Little Gaddesden in Hertfordshire.
