= Tonight (1975 TV programme) =

BBC television current affairs programme from 1975 to 1979

- Genre: News and Current affairs
- Created by: BBC
- Presented by: Sue Lawley; Denis Tuohy; Donald MacCormick; John Timpson; Ludovic Kennedy; Robin Day; Valerie Singleton
- Country of origin: United Kingdom
- No. of episodes: 756

Production
- News editors: Michael Bunce; Chris Capron; Roger Bolton
- Running time: 40-50 minutes

Original release
- Network: BBC1
- Release: 1 September 1975 – 15 July 1979

Tonight is a BBC television current affairs programme that was shown on weekday nights from 1 September 1975 until 5 July 1979 on BBC1. It was initially presented by Sue Lawley, Denis Tuohy and Donald MacCormick and reporters included John Pitman, Richard Kershaw, David Lomax, David Jessel and Michael Delahaye. Michael Bunce was the programme's first editor. Unlike its predecessor also called Tonight which was shown in the early evening, this programme was generally the last BBC1 programme each evening and appeared at variable times. It took over from the 24 Hours programme, also on BBC1 in late evenings, and ran in the same years as the BBC's Nationwide which was shown early evening.

In 1976, under editor Chris Capron, John Timpson alternated with Tuohy and MacCormick presented occasional topics. Lawley took maternity leave and Ludovic Kennedy and Robin Day, from BBC2's Newsday current affairs series, became new presenters, supported by Melvin Bragg and Barry Norman for arts and cinema topics. Jeremy Paxman became a new presenter.

Valerie Singleton had become a presenter and Roger Bolton the editor by the time the programme ended in July 1979, making way for Newsnight on BBC2.
