= Donald MacCormick =

Scottish broadcast journalist (1939–2009)

- Born: Donald MacCormick; 16 April 1939; Glasgow, Scotland
- Died: 12 July 2009 (aged 70)
- Occupations: Teacher, journalist, presenter
- Notable credit(s): Tonight; Newsnight; Question Time; Money Programme
- Spouses: Lis MacKinlay (divorced): Liz Elton
- Children: 5

Donald MacCormick (16 April 1939 – 12 July 2009) was a Scottish broadcast journalist.

== Early life ==
MacCormick's father was a Glasgow teacher who died when Donald was six. As a result, he became close to the family of his uncle John MacCormick, a lawyer and advocate for Scottish devolution.

He studied English at the University of Glasgow, where he was chairman of the Labour Club with Donald Dewar and John Smith. Following his graduation, he trained to become a teacher at Jordanhill College of Education and taught at the High School of Glasgow from 1962 to 1967.

== Media career ==
He began his media career in Scotland in 1967, working at Grampian Television as a news reporter and then later, on political programmes both for ITV and BBC. He presented the ground-breaking political programme Public Account for BBC Scotland with James Cox and Andrew Neil.

In 1975, he moved to London and became a presenter on BBC1's new Tonight programme and a series of national roles followed. Most significantly, along with John Tusa and Peter Snow, he made up the triumvirate that anchored Newsnight in its early years. MacCormick also chaired BBC1's Question Time, presented the Money Programme and for several years was a commentator on the BBC's live coverage of the party political conferences.

Moving to London Weekend Television in the early 1990s, MacCormick hosted a lunchtime news analysis programme and conducted a major discussion series during the First Gulf War. On the night of the 1992 general election he was one of the presenters of Sky News's election night coverage, alongside Sir David Frost. He later returned to Scotland to present three seasons of political programmes for Scottish Television in Glasgow. On radio, he hosted his own Sunday morning topical magazine programme on London News Direct.

MacCormick had moved into the corporate sector, interviewing executives for company videos, chairing conferences and working in media training.

On 28 March 2009 MacCormick returned to the BBC to present an evening on BBC Parliament. The Night The Government Fell marked the 30th anniversary of the vote of no confidence in the Labour government headed by James Callaghan. 30 years previously MacCormick had presented a live programme in Westminster covering these same events.

MacCormick died of a heart attack on 12 July 2009. He was divorced from Lis MacKinlay, by whom he had three children. He was married to Liz Elton from 1978 until his death; they had two children. All five children survive MacCormick.

Former Liberal Democrat leader Sir Menzies Campbell, who first met MacCormick at Glasgow University in 1959, paid tribute to the broadcaster saying: "Donald MacCormick was a prince among broadcasters. His style was always civil but insistent. He was always thoroughly prepared and his kind of journalism characterised all that is best in the BBC."
