= Any Questions? =

British topical discussion programme

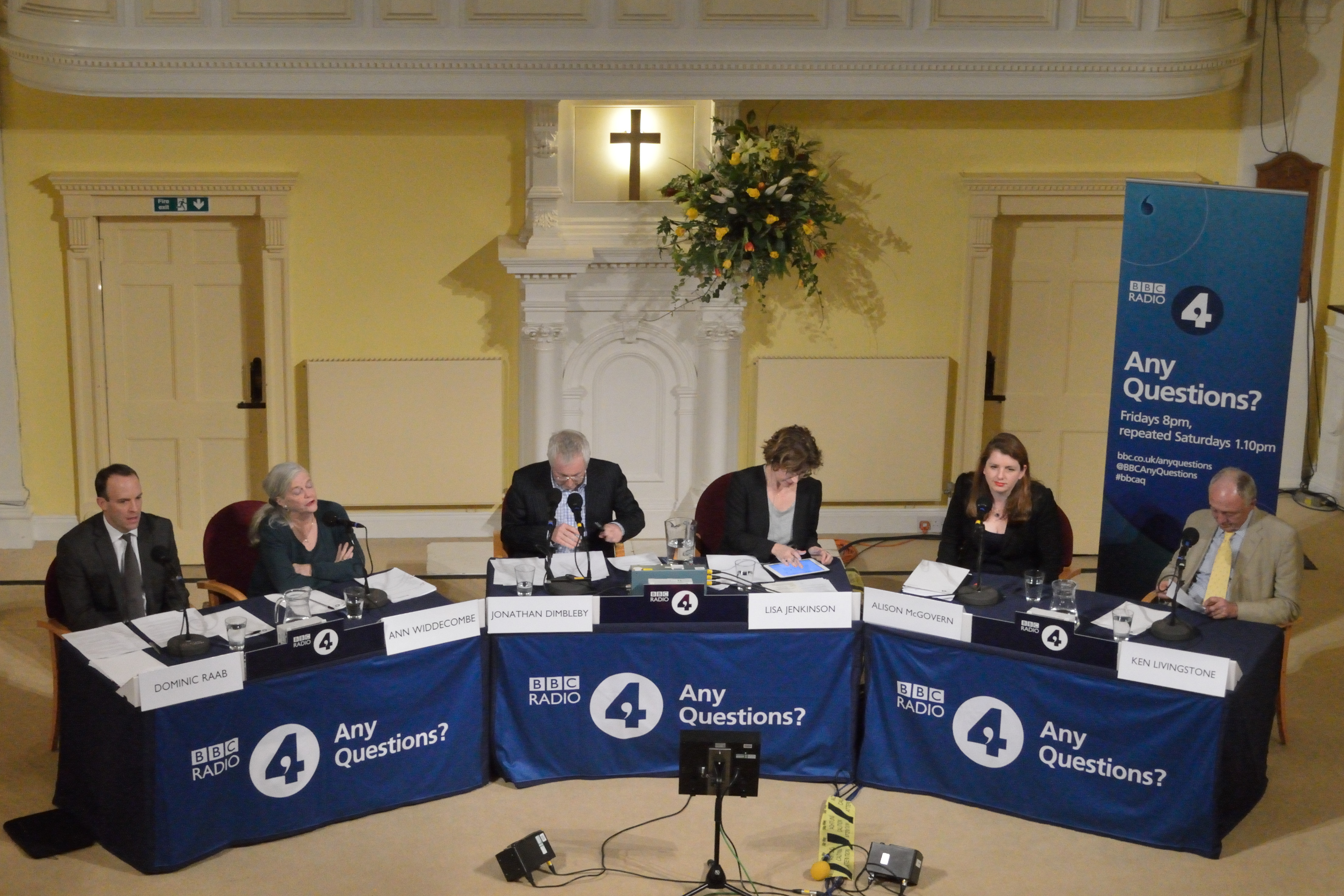
- The panel during a recording of a 2016 episode in the Nexus Methodist Church, Bath
- Genre: Topical discussion
- Running time: 50 minutes
- Country of origin: United Kingdom
- Language: English
- Home station: BBC Radio 4
- Hosted by: Current: Alex Forsyth (2022–); Former: Freddie Grisewood (1948–1967); David Jacobs (1967–1984); John Timpson (1984–1987); Jonathan Dimbleby (1987–2019); Chris Mason (2019–2022)
- Original release: 12 October 1948 – present
- Website: Any Questions?

Any Questions? is a British topical discussion programme "in which a panel of personalities from the worlds of politics, media, and elsewhere are posed questions by the audience".

It is typically broadcast on BBC Radio 4 on Fridays at 20:00 and repeated the following day at 13:10. Any Questions? is also available on BBC Sounds.

== Origins and scheduling ==
Any Questions? was first broadcast in October 1948, beginning as a fortnightly programme on the West of England Home Service and was originally intended to run for six editions only. It became a weekly programme in September 1949, broadcast live in the West Region on Friday evenings with a national repeat transmission on the Home Service up to six days later.

This pattern changed in September 1950 when the live Friday broadcast was switched to the BBC Light Programme (BBC Radio 2 from October 1967), although the discussion still came from venues in the West of England and the programme continued to be repeated later on the Home Service (BBC Radio 4 from October 1967).

On 10 April 1970, the Friday broadcast moved to Radio 4, which has broadcast both the live and the recorded editions of Any Questions? ever since.

== Presenters ==
Any Questions? was chaired by Freddie Grisewood from 1948 to 1967, by David Jacobs from 1967 to 1984, by John Timpson from 1984 to 1987 and by Jonathan Dimbleby from 1987 to 2019.

In March 2019, Dimbleby announced that he would "stand down... at the end of June". Shaun Ley, Ritula Shah, Edward Stourton and Julian Worricker served as interim moderators. In October 2019, Chris Mason was announced as Dimbleby's successor. Following Mason's appointment as political editor of BBC News in 2022, it was announced that Alex Forsyth would succeed him as regular presenter from November 2022.

== Venues ==
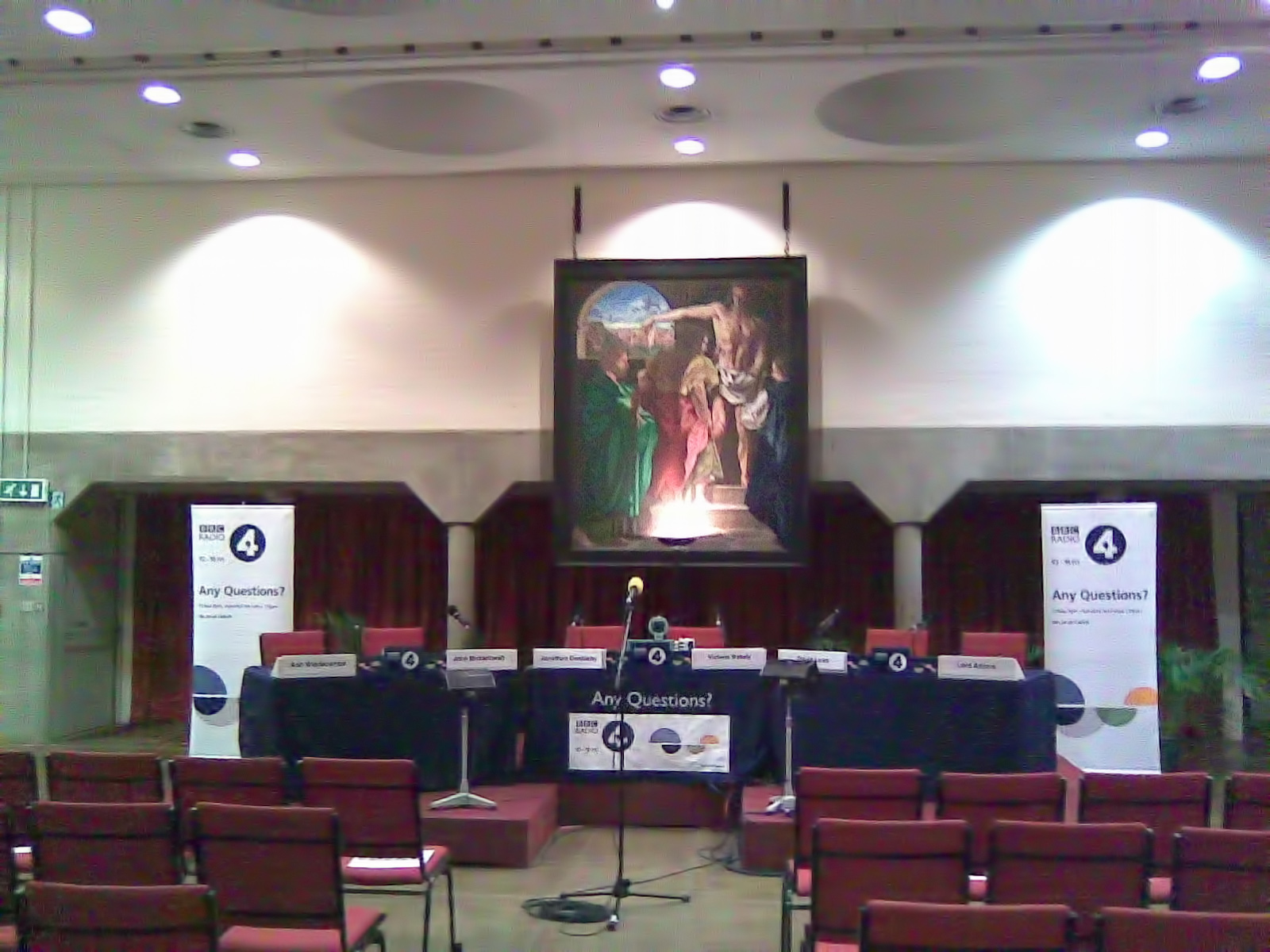
Tables set up for a recording at Oxford University's Catholic chaplaincy

Any Questions? is broadcast from a different location each week. Among others, Any Questions? has broadcast from educational institutions, performing arts venues, and religious and government buildings, including:

- Rugby's Ashlawn School
- Birmingham Repertory Theatre
- Chichester's Bishop Luffa School
- Runcorn's Bolingbroke Academy
- Bridlington Priory
- Brockenhurst College
- Weybridge's Brooklands College
- Peterborough's Bushfield Academy
- Aberystwyth's Ceredigion Museum
- Coventry Cathedral
- Crickhowell High School
- Falmouth University
- Giggleswick School
- Bath's Hayesfield Girls' School
- Cardiff's Hoddinott Hall
- London's Lady Margaret School
- Leeds Minster
- Horsforth's Leeds Trinity University
- Manchester Metropolitan University
- Middlesbrough Town Hall
- Oxford Town Hall
- Sevenoaks School
- Sheffield Cathedral
- St John's Wood Church
- University of Aberdeen
- University of Chester
- University of East London
- University of Glasgow
- University of Worcester
- Maidstone's Valley Park School
- Glasgow's Wellington Church
- Westminster Synagogue
- Weston Museum
- Holton's Wheatley Park School
- Wimbledon Synagogue, London – the programme's first ever broadcast from a synagogue, and coinciding with the 200th anniversary of the first Reform Judaism service.
- Wigan's Winstanley College
- Worthing College
- Sedbury's Wyedean School
- The Bishop's Stortford High School

== Notable editions ==
=== First edition ===
Any Questions? was first broadcast on 12 October 1948. The first edition was broadcast from the Guildhall in Winchester.

=== Demonstrators ===
During a November 1976 edition broadcast from Basingstoke, "stone-throwing demonstrators" smashed windows. Politician Enoch Powell, known for the Rivers of Blood speech in which he spoke about mass immigration, was on the panel, and demonstrators decided "to make their views heard".

=== Prison ===
In September 1991, Any Questions? was broadcast from Wayland Prison in Norfolk. The audience was made up of prisoners, who had prison officers sitting beside them. After the programme finished, the prisoners —without their officers — "crowded around" presenter Jonathan Dimbleby. One "confronted" Dimbleby, saying: "I want to ask you something, because we're quite cross here." After Dimbleby felt a moment of "alarm", the prisoner continued: "Why do we only hear Test Match Special now on longwave?" Dimbleby had "no answer" but felt "very relieved".

=== Stuck in traffic ===
In March 1993, Any Questions? broadcast during snowy weather. Then-Conservative Party chairman Norman Fowler was scheduled as a guest for that day; although he was stuck in traffic, he still managed to call on his mobile phone and take part in the discussion.

Presenter Jonathan Dimbleby went to Fowler first as "phone batteries used to run out very quickly". Fowler's first words were: "Good evening Jonathan, I find myself at something of a disadvantage here." Fellow panellist Jack Cunningham, then Labour's Shadow Foreign Secretary, replied: "Of course you are, you are in the Cabinet which is ruining the country!"

=== 60th anniversary ===
In October 2008, Any Questions? returned to Winchester for its 60th anniversary edition. On the panel, at the Henry Beaufort School, were: Labour MP Harriet Harman, historian and academic Peter Hennessy, Conservative politician Oliver Letwin, and Liberal Democrat Shirley Williams.

=== 2013 New York special ===
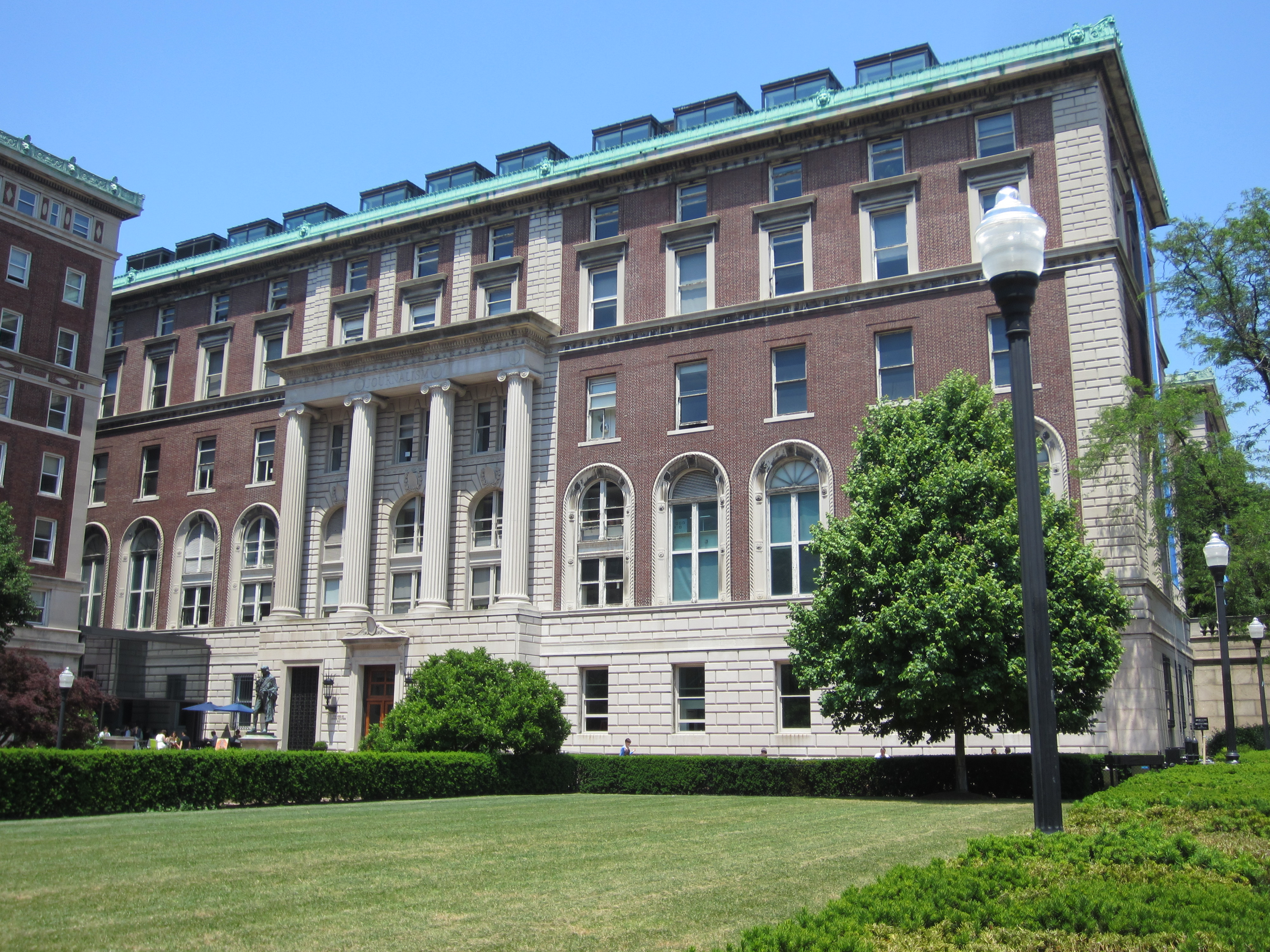
Columbia University Graduate School of Journalism, the venue for the programme's 2013 New York special

In April 2013, Any Questions? presented a "special edition" from New York, "to mark the first 100 days of President Obama's second term". On the panel were: Democratic Member of Congress Donna Edwards, Reuters editor-at-large Harry Evans, Republican Member of Congress Nan Hayworth, and Democratic politician, former Attorney General and Governor of New York state Eliot Spitzer. This edition was broadcast from Columbia University Graduate School of Journalism.

=== 70th anniversary ===
In October 2018, Any Questions? held its 70th anniversary edition at the House of Commons. On the panel were: Conservative politician Tom Pursglove, Scottish Labour Party MP Danielle Rowley, online estate agent Akshay Ruparelia, Our Future Our Choice co-founder Lara Spirit, and Rizzle Kicks singer Jordan Stephens. The panel answered questions on climate change, mental health and social media, Brexit, and housing. The programme's panel and audience were aged 18 to 30.

== See also ==
- Any Answers?
- Question Time (TV programme)
