= Kenneth Robinson (broadcaster) =

English pianist, architect, journalist and broadcaster

- Born: Kenneth John Robinson; 26 April 1925; Ealing, Middlesex
- Died: 26 March 1994 (aged 68) Kingston Hospital, London

Kenneth John Robinson (26 April 1925 – 26 March 1994) was an English pianist, architect, journalist, and broadcaster. Born in Ealing, he toured as a pianist with the Entertainments National Service Association (ENSA) and then took up posts at numerous newspapers. He then joined the BBC, where he was the presenter of BBC One's Points of View between 1965 and 1969 and BBC Radio 4's If It's Wednesday It Must Be... between 1972 and 1973 and a regular panellist on the latter's Start the Week between 1971 and 1986. He was notorious for acerbity, especially towards women, and spent six weeks suspended from Start the Week in 1984 for a joke about disabled people having sex.

== Life and career ==
Kenneth Robinson was born on 26 April 1925 in Ealing and was educated at Ealing Grammar School. During the Second World War, he was a pianist in ENSA concert parties, though aborted a planned concert career on competency grounds. He then spent a period working in the insurance industry. After the war, he wrote for The Croydon Advertiser, where he wrote caustic, Tynan-like reviews. The Independent's obituary for Robinson attributed his firing to a refusal to learn shorthand and typing; however, Robinson claimed in 1976 that he was fired for saying of Ten Little Niggers that it was "a pity" that more plays where "members of the cast are strangled and poisoned one by one [were] not available to the amateur". He then wrote for Architect and Building News, and then spent ten years with the Architectural Press, ending up as chief assistant editor for the Architects' Journal.

Robinson married Mary Hargreaves in 1955 and had a son and daughter with her. Their marriage was not a happy one; Gyles Brandreth wrote of meeting Robinson in a 1987 diary entry that he had said of her: "If only I had murdered her when I first thought of it, I'd be out of prison by now". He joined The Design Centre in the mid-1950s, where he found that lecture-goers preferred the humorous content of his lectures to the architectural content. He had begun contributing humorous items to journals and radio by the time he left The Design Centre in 1962; his first pieces were on the foibles of architecture and language. Between 1965 and 1969, Robinson presented BBC One's Points of View, a show also hosted by Robert Robinson, Tony Robinson, and Anne Robinson. He was fired from that show after its producer objected to the frivolous way in which he referred to bananas; it later transpired that the producer was married to a banana heiress. He had a stint as a presenter of religious programmes, but the producer found his tone too ironic for the subject matter.

In 1971, Robinson became a regular guest panellist of Start the Week, a BBC Radio 4 show usually presented by Richard Baker. He became notorious for acerbity, especially towards women; he rowed with Anna Raeburn and Esther Rantzen, brought Angela Rippon to tears after dismantling her book about horses and caused Jilly Cooper to flee the studio in a similar state, and disgusted Pamela Stephenson enough for her to empty a jug of water down his neck. His other victims included the editor of H&E naturist, to whom he said that he "loathe[d] and despise[d] everything [they] stood for", stand-in host Melvyn Bragg, who had a copy of Barbara Woodhouse's Talking to Animals thrown at him, and the writers Frederic Raphael and Angela Neustatter. Cooper, who had also been told by Clive James that she had "rotten skin" and "square boobs", attempted to get her own back on both by naming two sketches of pigs she had contributed to "The Mencap Famous Faces Collection" after them, though the caption was changed to "Two critics" on legal advice.

In January 1984, in response to a lecturer from the University of East Anglia talking about a dating agency for disabled people, Robinson joked that the service would mean that "you could hear the wheelchairs banging all night in some parts of the country", for which he was chastised by stand-in host Jimmy Hill and suspended for six weeks by an apologetic BBC. His remark did however amuse The Spastics Society, who commissioned him to write a humorous book for the disabled. Robinson was fired with three days notice on 13 June 1986, causing him to describe his sacking as "a bloody disgrace" on-air during his last programme three days later.

Robinson also presented If It's Wednesday It Must Be..., a vehicle for Kenny Everett and Vivian Stanshall, for three series between summer 1972 and Easter 1973. Everett's biography Hello, Darlings describes Robinson as "probably the only man in radio who had been sacked more times than Kenny". Around this time, Robinson also narrated Les Shadoks. In addition, he had a stage show during the 1970s, The Worst of Kenneth Robinson, that he had developed from talks he had given at such venues as women's institutes and young conservative groups. A compilation programme of these shows, The Best of the Worst of Kenneth Robinson, aired on ITV in January 1975. In 1983, he threw a bucket of water over Stephenson to raise money to protest the creation of Sizewell. He spent his final years contributing freelance articles to journals such as Punch and The Listener and died on 26 March 1994 from a heart attack in Kingston Hospital.

== Selected filmography ==
- Points of View (host, 1965-1969)
- Start the Week (panellist and occasional host, 1971-1986)
- If It's Wednesday, It Must Be... (1972-3)
- Les Shadoks (1973)
- The Best of the Worst of Kenneth Robinson (1975)
- Just a Minute (1979)
- The Innes Book of Records (1980)
