= 5 Live Report =

Weekly investigative programme on BBC Radio 5 Live

5 Live Report was a weekly investigative programme on BBC Radio 5 Live. It was broadcast live at 11 a.m. on Sundays as part of the Julian Worricker programme, and a recorded half-hour documentary was broadcast on Sundays, schedule permitting.

Most reports were produced by the BBC's Radio Current Affairs department, with a sizeable contribution by the independent company All Out Productions, and occasional productions by BBC Northern Ireland.

The reports have been criticised by Elisabeth Mahoney of The Guardian for sometimes feeling "too much like sensation and too little like substance".

== Notable reports ==
In 2001 a report uncovered evidence that there had been miscarriages of justice in many cases where parents, including Sally Clark, had been convicted of murdering babies on the basis of unreliable statistical evidence concerning multiple cot deaths in the same family. Clark was freed on appeal in 2003.

A 2002 report about prisoners on death row in the United States included an interview with Kenny Richey, who had been convicted of murdering a two-year-old in an arson attack, but whose case was widely considered to be a miscarriage of justice. Richie was also later freed after a plea bargain.

2003 reports included one on the rise of the British National Party in Burnley, and one on the use of illegal drugs in the workplace.

In 2004 the 5 Live Report investigated the legacy of the Bhopal disaster 20 years earlier, finding that concentrations of toxic materials in Bhopal were still up to 500 times the World Health Organization's recommended maximum levels.

The report has also featured an interview with Saudi opposition leader Mohammad al-Massari, who admitted to having been in contact with Osama bin Laden and that he would do so again.
