= Points of View (TV programme) =

British TV viewer feedback programme (since 1961)

- Title card from 1985–1987
- Also known as: POV
- Genre: Factual
- Presented by: Robert Robinson; Kenneth Robinson; Barry Took; Guest presenters Anne Robinson; Carol Vorderman; Des Lynam; Terry Wogan; Jeremy Vine; Tina Daheley
- Narrated by: Tina Daheley; Nicki Chapman
- Country of origin: United Kingdom
- Original language: English
- No. of series: 49

Production
- Production locations: BBC TV Centre, BBC White City (1961–2012); Broadcasting House, London (2013–present)
- Running time: 14–15 mins
- Production companies: BBC Studios (2015–present); BBC Features Northern Ireland (2013–2014); BBC Productions Birmingham (1999–2013)

Original release
- Network: BBC One
- Release: 2 October 1961 – present

Related
- Junior Points of View (1963–1970)

Points of View is a long-running British television series broadcast on BBC One. It started on 2 October 1961 and features the letters of viewers offering praise, criticism and observations on BBC television programmes of recent weeks.

== History ==
Points of View began in 1961 with Robert Robinson presenting viewers' letters to the BBC. It was originally designed as an occasional five-minute "filler" to plug gaps between shows. Kenneth Robinson (no relation) took over in 1965, though Robert Robinson returned in 1969 before the show was dropped in 1971. During the 1960s there was also a spin-off, Junior Points of View.

The show returned on 31 August 1979 after a hiatus of eight years, now presented by Barry Took. On its return, Points of View was only broadcast in the London area as a five-minute filler whilst other parts of England were broadcasting regional programming, but in February 1980 it was broadcast across the whole of the UK and moved to more familiar slot before the Nine O'Clock News. Took left in 1986 and was replaced by guest presenters including Tony Robinson, Alan Titchmarsh and Chris Serle, until Anne Robinson took over as presenter in 1987. For many years during this period, the programme was broadcast at 20:50 on Wednesday evenings. Robinson left the series in 1997 to concentrate on Watchdog. Following another period with guest presenters which included the likes of Vanessa Feltz, Janet Street Porter, Jill Dando & Roger Cook, Carol Vorderman became the next regular presenter in April 1998 but was replaced by Des Lynam in February 1999.

In October 1999, Points of View moved to a Sunday early evening slot, with Lynam replaced as presenter by Terry Wogan and now included emails in addition to letters and telephone calls. In the 2007 series, Points of View featured diverse films, such as students from Sussex University making a passionate plea for the BBC to keep the soap opera Neighbours, John Leivers interviewing BBC Two controller Roly Keating on the channel's direction, and Jill Parkinson asking why there were not more people with disabilities featured in BBC programmes.

In April 2008, Jeremy Vine became the regular presenter of the series. From April 2013, production switched to BBC Northern Ireland. Vine announced his retirement from the show on the 1 July 2018 edition. In order to refresh the series, which returned in the autumn, and allow more time for audience feedback, the presenter role was dropped and replaced with narration by Tina Daheley; however, the show returned to the presenter format, whilst retaining Daheley, in 2022. Nicki Chapman narrated the 2021 series as Daheley was absent due to her pregnancy.

== Public perception ==
The show has been seen as representing a certain passive-aggressive aspect of British culture; Victoria Wood once said: "When the Russians feel strongly about an issue they form a bloody revolution – the British write a strongly worded letter to Points of View". Although, much less common now, the show has over the decades featured many a letter beginning "Why, oh why, oh why..." and signed "Upset of Uxbridge" or "Disgusted of Tunbridge Wells", or something similar (these days, most, if not all, simply use their real names). Along the way the show has catered for those who wish to see particular parts of programmes again, featuring letters asking "Please, please, please could you show the clip where Vera Lynn sang to the troops on the 50th anniversary of D-Day last week", and the like.

The series has been criticised for featuring too much praise of the BBC and its programmes, and playing down criticism. This tendency has been sent up by many comedians over the years, including memorable skits in Monty Python's Flying Circus and Not the Nine O'Clock News. In the latter, positive letters said such things as "I think the (television licence) fee is far too low. I would willingly sell my house and all its contents to help the BBC."

Further criticism came from comedians Stephen Fry and Hugh Laurie in their sketch comedy show A Bit of Fry and Laurie. In a sketch where Fry had supposedly removed Laurie's brain, Laurie said that he was "off to write a letter to Points of View". In a later episode, a woman claims she has had two letters read out on Points of View, and that "they say if you get three, you're automatically sectioned under the Mental Health Act." The programme became (around 1994) the first BBC TV show to invite contributions by email, and at one point, its producer Bernard Newnham – who produced more than five years' worth of shows, four of which were with Anne Robinson – had the only internet connection in BBC Television Centre.

== Presenters ==
- Robert Robinson (1961–1965; 1969–1971)
- Kenneth Robinson (1965–1969)
- Barry Took (1979–1986)
- Anne Robinson (January 1987 – September 1997)
- Guest presenters (September 1997 – March 1998)
- Carol Vorderman (April – August 1998)
- Des Lynam (February – May 1999)
- Terry Wogan (October 1999 – September 2007)
- Jeremy Vine (April 2008 – July 2018)
- Tina Daheley (September 2018–present)
- Nicki Chapman (April – October 2021, stand-in)

== Junior Points of View ==
Between 1963 and 1970, Robert Robinson (later replaced by Sarah Ward, and Gaynor Morgan Rees) presented a version designed for children's letters entitled Junior Points of View.

== Theme ==
The original theme tune to the programme was the first 13 seconds of Kid Ory's trad jazz piece "Yaaka Hula Hickey Dula", played by the Dutch Swing College Band. When the series returned in 1979 a new piece called "Northern soul" was used before switching in 1982 to adopting the Beatles' "When I'm Sixty-Four" as its theme tune (because of the lyric "Send me a postcard, drop me a line, stating point of view"). This was dropped at the end of 1990.

In 2000, a bespoke acapella theme tune, entitled "Blah Blah" or "Blah Boopity Baya" was introduced, alongside a new title sequence in 2003, featuring members of the public talking to a screen showing BBC programmes and channels, set against a black background with streaks of light flying past. The composers and performers involved in the creation of this theme tune are unknown. In 2009, the theme gained notoriety when it was featured on BBC Radio 6 Music's Adam and Joe radio show, with the presenters mocking the theme tune's upbeat sound compared to the overall serious tone of Points of View at the time (then presented by Jeremy Vine; though the show became more light-hearted across Vine's overall run as presenter), adding that "the BBC's been in some quite serious trouble of late, so this is just a suggestion to our colleagues at the castle [BBC Television Centre]... you might want to change that music".

In 2011, an alternative mix of the previous theme came into use, with the acapella vocals being swapped for a synthesizer and background strings.

== See also ==
- Feedback, the listener response programme for BBC radio networks
- Newswatch, a viewer response programme focused on BBC News
- Right to Reply, a viewer response programme previously broadcast by Channel 4
- Open Air, another viewer response programme broadcast live on BBC One
- Mailbag, a viewer response programme broadcast on RTÉ One in Ireland
