= John Timpson =

British journalist (1928–2005)

John Timpson OBE
- Timpson in the mid 1960s
- Born: John Harry Robert Timpson; 2 July 1928; Kenton, Middlesex, England
- Died: 19 November 2005 (aged 77); King's Lynn, Norfolk, England
- Occupations: Journalist and radio presenter

John Harry Robert Timpson, OBE (2 July 1928 – 19 November 2005) was a British journalist, best known as a radio presenter.

== Early life ==
The son of John Hubert Victor Timpson and his wife Caroline Willson, Timpson was born at Ridgeholme, 53 The Ridgeway, Kenton, Middlesex, and was educated at Merchant Taylors' School, a boys' independent school in Northwood, Middlesex.

== Career ==
On leaving school he went straight into employment at the Wembley News as a sixteen-year-old cub reporter. After one year there, he had three years of national service in the Royal Army Service Corps, from 1946 to 1949, then returned to the Wembley News for two years. In 1951, he married Patricia Whale and they moved to Norfolk, where he worked for the Eastern Daily Press until 1959, when he started to work for BBC News as a reporter. In 1962, he was appointed as deputy court correspondent, covering overseas royal visits, including tours by Elizabeth II of Australia and Ethiopia, and remained in this post until 1967.

From 1964, Timpson presented Newsroom on BBC 2, which on 1 July 1967 became the first British television news programme to make the switch to colour. He later presented the BBC's late evening Tonight programme.

Timpson co-presented the BBC Radio 4 programme Today from 1970 to 1976 and again from 1978 to 1986, returning to Tonight during the gap. Initially appointed to steady a programme affected by the erratic Jack de Manio, he later presented it in tandem with Robert Robinson and Brian Redhead, among others, forming a popular partnership with the latter. Timpson became known as the more humorous of the two men, with jocular asides like "Insulation – Britain lags behind" or "Crash course for learner drivers".

From 1984 to 1987, Timpson also presented the popular weekly radio show Any Questions?. He was generally perceived as something of a small-c conservative traditionalist and probably politically to the right of his colleague Brian Redhead.

His experiences in broadcasting provided Timpson with material for several books: Today and Yesterday (1976), The Lighter Side of Today (1983) and The Early Morning Book (1986). After his retirement from the BBC he returned to Norfolk and continued writing books, mostly about England and about East Anglia in particular. These included two novels, Paper Trail (1989) and the follow up Sound Track (1991), and two works on the quirks and oddities of English life – Timpson's England (1987) and Timpson's Towns (1989). Later books included Timpson’s English Eccentrics (1991), Timpson’s English Villages (1992), Timpson’s Other England (1993), Timpson’s English Country Inns (1995) and Timpson on the Verge (2002).

On 15 June 1990, the County School railway station in central Norfolk was formally opened as a heritage railway centre by Timpson, who was brought into the station for the occasion on a short train composed of a Ruston diesel locomotive and an LMS brake van.

== Honours ==
In 1986, Timpson was awarded a Sony Gold Award for outstanding services to radio, and the following year he was awarded an OBE for his services to broadcasting.

== Personal life ==
Timpson married Muriel Patricia Whale in 1951, and they had two sons.

He died in King's Lynn, Norfolk, on 19 November 2005 and was buried at his parish church, St Peter's, Weasenham. He was survived by his wife and older son, Jeremy. His second son, Nick, had died five weeks before him. A memorial service was held at Norwich Cathedral on 22 February 2006, when family, friends, and colleagues gathered to celebrate his long and productive life and career. The speakers included the Director of BBC Radio and Music, Jenny Abramsky.
