= Valley Park School =

Location
- Huntsman Lane; Maidstone, Kent, ME14 5DT; United Kingdom
- 51°16′30″N 0°32′10″E

Information
- Type: Academy
- Local authority: Kent
- Specialist: Arts College
- Department for Education URN: 136581 Tables
- Ofsted: Reports
- Chair of Governors: Nick Baster
- Executive Headteacher: Kim Gunn
- Staff: 143
- Gender: Co-educational
- Age: 11 to 18
- Enrolment: 1658
- Colours: Green & White
- Website: http://www.valleypark.viat.org.uk

Valley Park School is an academy school in Maidstone, Kent, England. The school caters for girls and boys between the ages of 11 and 18.

Valley Park became a specialist Arts College in July 2007. It also has the Artsmark Gold award.

Valley Park holds many activities for students e.g. focus days, trips to foreign countries and the best young farmers club in Kent. The school offers a wide range of subjects including English, Maths, History, Science, Music, P.E., Drama, D.T., I.C.T, Art, R.E., Geography, Business Studies, Modern Languages and Agriculture.

== Results ==
The school's GCSE results are average for a secondary school, with 89% of students achieving 5 A*-C grades, with 41% 5A*-C including English and Maths. Valley Park is in the top 5% of schools nationally for Contextual Value Added with a score of 1047.9
