= Feedback (radio series) =

British radio programme

- Genre: Talk radio
- Running time: Under 30 minutes
- Country of origin: United Kingdom
- Language: English
- Home station: BBC Radio 4
- Hosted by: Andrea Catherwood
- Recording studio: Testbed Productions (1994–2006); City Broadcasting (2006–2010); Whistledown Productions (2010–2019); Juniper Connect (2019–2022); Whistledown Productions (2022–present)
- Original release: 1 April 1979

Feedback is a BBC Radio 4 series dealing with listener reaction to the style and content of BBC radio broadcasting. The programme is presented by Andrea Catherwood.

== Format ==
The presenter introduces listeners' letters, phone calls, emails or tweets. It is a conduit for enraged listeners to enunciate their outrage or for enraptured listeners to express their praise for specific BBC radio programmes, and covers the output of other BBC national stations, such as Radio 1, as well as that of Radio 4. On occasion, the comments have less to do with content than with the media by which programmes may be broadcast; for instance, the iPlayer and BBC Sounds.

Producers of radio programmes are often invited for a polite question and answer session with the show's presenter. However, not all of them agree to take part. Another problem is that service improvements announced on Feedback have not always been implemented.

== Transmission ==
The programme, which runs for just under half an hour, is normally broadcast on Thursdays at 15.30 and repeated on the following Sunday at 20.02. The 34 programmes a year (the series is off air in the summer) was produced from October 2010 - 2019 by Whistledown Productions in London. Whistledown took over from City Broadcasting, which had made Feedback since November 2006. Before that, Testbed Productions had produced the programme for twelve years. Juniper Connect produced the programme between 2019 - 2022 and then Whistledown won the tender back.

== History ==
Originally a 15-minute programme, Feedback began on 1 April 1979, replacing an earlier similar programme called Disgusted, Tunbridge Wells. Amongst its first presenters were Colin Semper, a former head of Religious Broadcasting, and Susan Marling. Mary Whitehouse, a regular critic of BBC programming policy, was a temporary presenter in the mid-1980s. For many years in the 1980s and 1990s it was fronted by Chris Dunkley, at that time television critic for the Financial Times (he was always introduced as "Chris Dunkley of the Financial Times", with the intention of reinforcing his independence from BBC management). The programme was presented by Roger Bolton, formerly of Channel 4's viewer feedback programme Right to Reply, for 23 years. Bolton became the regular presenter in April 1999, with his last episode being first broadcast on BBC Radio 4 on 26 August 2022.

The BBC did not provide a reason for Bolton's removal as presenter of Feedback, but thanked him for his work and said it would be seeking a new presenter and production company for the programme. Bolton said "I'd have liked to have continued", and the change was met with criticism from politicians and journalists. Bolton then launched an independent podcast, Roger Bolton's Beeb Watch, which is produced by a former BBC colleague and looks at the challenges facing public service broadcasting generally with a particular focus on the BBC.

On 14 October 2022 the programme resumed with Andrea Catherwood as presenter.

== Notable topics ==
- Radio Four comedies such as The News Quiz have been a popular topic.
- The Archers (specifically when Ruth Archer strayed from the straight and narrow).
- The argument that Radio Four presenters were biased towards arts and lacked competence in science.
- The subject of the Russell Brand Show prank telephone calls row was a prominent topic of controversy on the programme in the autumn of 2008.
- BBC executives not wanting to take part to give replies to criticisms

The television equivalents of Feedback are Newswatch and Points of View (POV), with Bolton presenting Channel 4's version of POV in the 1990s, called Right to Reply.
