= Start the Week =

BBC Radio 4 discussion programme

- Genre: Discussion
- Running time: Approx. 43 minutes
- Country of origin: United Kingdom
- Language: English
- Home station: BBC Radio 4
- Hosted by: Tom Sutcliffe
- Original release: April 1970 – present
- Website: www.bbc.co.uk/programmes/b006r9xr
- Podcast: www.bbc.co.uk/sounds/brand/b006r9xr

Start the Week is a discussion programme that is broadcast on BBC Radio 4 and began in April 1970. The current presenter is Tom Sutcliffe. Previous regular presenters have been Richard Baker, Russell Harty, Melvyn Bragg, Jeremy Paxman and Andrew Marr.

It is broadcast (usually) live on Monday mornings between 9:02 am and 9:45 am, and is repeated in a shortened, edited version at 9:30 pm the same evening. Its guests typically come from the worlds of politics, journalism, science and the arts. Prior to Marr, the programme had a number of regular secondary presenters, including Ken Sykora, Kenneth Robinson (who began in 1971 during the Baker era), Rosie Boycott, Catherine Bennett and Lisa Jardine.

== History ==
=== Richard Baker (1970–1987) ===
The original programme differed from its current form; for the first year or so it was entirely pre-recorded. Produced by Michael Ember, a flamboyant producer from the BBC Hungarian Service, the 1970 show was supposed to be intelligent banter on a weekly theme, held together in a jocular fashion by Richard Baker, a well-known television newsreader.

If that week contained Valentine's Day, for example, the show would start with some hints as to proper behaviour for that day, a bit of history, then a tape recorded by Doug Crawford, a former pirate radio DJ, consisting of a montage of music, archive recordings, opinions recorded on the street and the like, presenting the public's image of the day in question.

After eight minutes or so, the programme returned to the live studio for anecdotes and discussion from a variety of guests. Regulars included Lance Percival, a satirist from TV shows of the time who sang the Start the Week intro theme as a topical calypso, cookery with Zena Skinner.

The programme had a regular following but was thought to be too light-hearted and irreverent for 9.00am on Monday mornings by a new Director of Programmes.

=== Russell Harty (1987–1988) ===
The programme turned towards being a chat show during Harty's year in the chair; Melvyn Bragg, a friend of Harty's, first appeared on the programme as a substitute presenter before illness led to Harty's death in 1988.

=== Melvyn Bragg (1988–1998) ===
After Harty's death, several presenters were tried out, including Kate Adie, Sue Lawley, George Melly and Melvyn Bragg. During Bragg's tenure the programme gained "a new reputation for gravitas"; and also a larger audience, which by 1996 was "at one to one and a half million, slightly more than the far more middle-brow programmes such as Midweek, Desert Island Discs and Loose Ends, which occupy the slot on other days."

According to The Independent newspaper, "rows, however innocuous some of them seemed at the time, have become a trademark under Bragg: among the most notable have been Ben Elton vs Brenda Maddox, Rosie Boycott and Bragg vs novelist Kathy Lette, Armistead Maupin vs Libby Purves, and Bragg himself vs (separately) Joan Smith, Michael Dobbs, William Cash, Tony Parsons and Jean Aitchison.

The programme's prominence in BBC Radio 4's schedule meant that Bragg's elevation to the House of Lords as a life peer necessitated his relinquishing of involvement in the programme.

=== Jeremy Paxman (1998–2002) ===
Jeremy Paxman's tenure was relatively short for a broadcaster of his stature because his aggressive style of interviewing was not considered compatible with the programme.

=== Andrew Marr (2002–2020) ===
Andrew Marr took over as the programme's presenter in 2002. Occasional stand-in presenters in recent years have included David Baddiel and Sue MacGregor. In January 2013, Marr suffered a stroke and went on sabbatical from the show, though he did chair a one-off episode in November and several episodes in December 2013. He thereafter returned as the presenter of the show, but not on a full-time basis. Since 2013, Marr has alternated with various presenters, currently Tom Sutcliffe, Kirsty Wark, Adam Rutherford and Amol Rajan.

== Awards ==
Start the Week won the Best Radio Programme category in the 1994 and 2005 Voice of the Listener & Viewer Awards, and is only the second programme to win the award twice.

== See also ==
- Stop the Week
