= This Week (1956 TV programme) =

British TV current affairs programme (1956–1978, 1986–1992)

- Title card in 1992
- Genre: Current Affairs
- Opening theme: Intermezzo from Karelia Suite
- Composer: Jean Sibelius
- Country of origin: United Kingdom
- Original language: English

Production
- Production companies: Associated-Rediffusion (until 1968); Thames Television (from 1968)

Original release
- Network: ITV
- Release: 6 January 1956 – 20 July 1978
- Release: 11 September 1986 – 17 December 1992

This Week is a British weekly current affairs television programme that was first produced for ITV on 6 January 1956 by Associated-Rediffusion (later Thames Television), running until 20 July 1978, when it was replaced by TV Eye. On 11 September 1986, the earlier name was revived and This Week continued until Thames lost its franchise at the end of 1992.

In September 1958, This Week filmed George Harrison Marks and Pamela Green at their photography studio in Gerrard Street. David Kentick directed and Nick Barker interviewed Marks and Green. They were filmed working with a nude model, who was strategically covered by a very long wig. The film sequence ended with a montage of their photographs, mostly of nudes. However, the night it was to be broadcast Pope Pius XII died and the programme was cut, and the interview never shown. In 1964, This Week returned to their studio. This time round they showed a clip of the infamous striptease comedy film The Window Dresser.

One of its more notable episodes was an exposé of the National Front in 1974, which led to the party's members removing its Chairman John Tyndall and National Activities Organiser Martin Webster two weeks later. The programme featured revelations from former NF Chairman John O'Brien about their neo-Nazi paramilitary pasts and alleged continuing links to extremist groups.

This Week – The National Front, originally broadcast on 5 September 1974, was repeated on Channel 4 on 22 February 1992 as part of TV Heaven, a series of archive television programmes hosted by Frank Muir.

In 1976 the episode Death in the West believed to contain the first recorded admission from a tobacco company representative that smoking causes health problems resulted in an injunction from Philip Morris International.

The most controversial edition was "Death on the Rock", a 1988 documentary which questioned the official account of the Gibraltar shootings.

== Production ==
This Week employed a substantial team of reporters, researchers, directors, producers and film crews. A 1970 TV Times feature described a production operation of around 30 people working from Television House in London. Ideas for stories came into the programme from a variety of sources, with researchers gathering information for directors and reporters, while film crews and sound recordists worked in the field and film editors and dubbing mixers assembled the finished reports.

Among the reporters who worked on the programme were James Cameron, George Fittch, Llew Gardner and Peter Williams. A 1966 TV Times listing identifies all four as reporters on the programme.

Peter Williams was a reporter and producer on This Week for 14 years. He had left school at 15 and begun his career as an office boy at the Bristol Evening Post, subsequently working as a newspaper journalist before moving into television. Williams recalled that he had made more programmes for This Week than any other reporter in the programme's history.

Research was an important part of the programme's work. Williams subsequently described research as the most difficult and important part of the production process.

During its run, the programme's presenters included Ludovic Kennedy, James Cameron, Jonathan Dimbleby, Robert Kee, Dan Farson, Jeremy Thorpe (who became leader of the Liberal Party), Desmond Wilcox, Bryan Magee, Peter Taylor (noted for his coverage of Northern Ireland), Denis Tuohy, John Morgan and Yvonne Roberts.

The programme used the Intermezzo from Sibelius's Karelia Suite as a signature tune.

== See also ==
- Peter Morley
