= Right to Reply =

- Right to Reply logo, 2000s
- Genre: Op-ed, discussion of television
- Developed by: Channel Four
- Presented by: Gus Macdonald (1980s); Roger Bolton (1990s); Sheena McDonald; Rory McGrath
- Country of origin: United Kingdom
- Original language: English

Production
- Running time: Usually 25–30 minutes

Original release
- Network: Channel 4
- Release: 14 November 1982 – 20 April 2001

Related
- The TV Show

Right to Reply (sometimes called R2R) is a British television series shown on Channel 4 from 1982 until 2001, which allowed viewers to voice their complaints or concerns about TV programmes. It featured reports, usually presented by a viewer, and interviews with the programme-makers concerned.

== History ==
Right to Reply was more serious and less humorous than its BBC equivalent Points of View. Also, R2R discussed all channels' programmes, although, originally, only "Channel Four programme makers [were] called to account"; after a few years R2R started to discuss ITV shows as well, and soon also added BBC, and later satellite/cable shows. Points of View only commented on BBC programmes, and continues to today.

A notable feature of Right to Reply was the "video box", which gave viewers a third means of communicating with the programme in the 1980s, alongside letter or telephone. In the late 1990s (until 2001) the "Right to Reply 500", a group of 500 TV viewers, answered weekly online surveys about current television issues.

=== Cancellation ===
Channel 4's 2001 decision to end Right to Reply, after a run of more than 18 years, was criticised by its fans, since nothing similar remains in its place. Some have said that the cancellation was representative of Channel 4's move into the mainstream and unwillingness to take risks like it did in the 1980s - said one viewer, "the Channel 4 that I view today has evolved into just another TV channel".

=== Reinstatement ===
On 24 May 2007, Ofcom ordered the reinstatement of a Channel Four Right to Reply programme in its adjudication of the 2007 Celebrity Big Brother race row. The TV Show was shown once a month on Channel 4, but by the end of the second series, the show was cancelled due to poor ratings and reviews.
