= BBC =

British public service broadcaster

British Broadcasting Corporation
- Logo used since 2021
- Type: Chartered corporation, public broadcaster
- Industry: Mass media
- Predecessor: British Broadcasting Company
- Founded: 18 October 1922; 104 years ago (as British Broadcasting Company); 1 January 1927; 99 years ago (as British Broadcasting Corporation)
- Founder: Government of the United Kingdom
- Headquarters: Broadcasting House; London, England
- Area served: Worldwide
- Key people: Samir Shah (Chair); Matt Brittin (Director-General); Rhodri Talfan Davies (Deputy Director-General)
- Products: Broadcasting; Web portals
- Services: Television; Radio; Online
- Revenue: ▼£5.389 billion (2024)
- Operating income: ▼£199 million (2024)
- Net income: ▲£229 million (2024)
- Total assets: ▼£1.976 billion (2024)
- Number of employees: ▲21,918 (2024)
- Parent: Department for Digital, Culture, Media and Sport
- Divisions: BBC Television; BBC Sport; BBC Radio; BBC News; BBC Online; BBC Sounds; BBC Weather; BBC Music; BBC English Regions; BBC Scotland; BBC Cymru Wales; BBC Northern Ireland; BBC North; BBC Bitesize; BBC Studios
- Website: bbc.com

The British Broadcasting Corporation (BBC) is a British public service broadcaster headquartered at Broadcasting House in London, England. Originally established in 1922 as the British Broadcasting Company, it evolved into its current state with its current name on 1 January 1927. It is the oldest and largest local and global broadcaster by stature and by number of employees, with a total staff of 22,000.

The BBC was established under a royal charter, and operates under an agreement with the secretary of state for culture, media and sport. Its work is funded principally by an annual television licence fee which is charged to all British households, companies, and organisations using any type of equipment to receive or record live television broadcasts or to use the BBC's streaming service, iPlayer. The fee is set by the British government, agreed by Parliament, and is used to fund the BBC's radio, TV, and online services covering the nations and regions of the UK. Since 1 April 2014, it has also funded the BBC World Service (launched in 1932 as the BBC Empire Service), which broadcasts in 43 languages as of 2026.

Some of the BBC's revenue comes from its commercial subsidiary BBC Studios (formerly BBC Worldwide), which sells BBC programs and services internationally and also distributes the BBC's international 24-hour English-language news services BBC News, and from BBC.com, provided by BBC Global News Ltd.

Since its formation on 18 October 1922, the BBC has played a prominent role in British life and culture. It is sometimes informally referred to as the Beeb or Auntie. In 1923 it launched Radio Times (subtitled "The official organ of the BBC"), the first broadcast listings magazine; the 1988 Christmas edition sold 11 million copies, the biggest-selling edition of any British magazine in history.

The BBC has received sustained criticism over its impartiality, independence and funding. It has faced backlash over its coverage of the Iraq War, the Israel-Palestine conflict, transgender rights, and over allegations of antisemitism and colonial attitudes. Accusations of political bias have been made from both the left and the right, and editorial controversies have led to resignations of senior executives. The BBC manages an investigative reporting unit, BBC investigates, which it touts for "ground-breaking" investigations that provide depth and stories beyond breaking news.

== History ==
=== 1920–1922: The birth of British broadcasting ===
Britain's first live public broadcast was made from the factory of Marconi Company in Chelmsford in June 1920. It was sponsored by the Daily Mail's Alfred Harmsworth, 1st Viscount Northcliffe and featured the famous Australian soprano Dame Nellie Melba. The Melba broadcast caught the people's imagination and marked a turning point in the British public's attitude to radio. However, this public enthusiasm was not shared in official circles where such broadcasts were held to interfere with important military and civil communications. By late 1920, the pressure from these quarters and uneasiness among the staff of the licensing authority, the General Post Office (GPO), was sufficient to lead to a ban on further Chelmsford broadcasts.

But by 1922 the GPO had received nearly 100 broadcast licence requests and moved to rescind its ban in the wake of a petition by 63 wireless societies with over 3,000 members. Anxious to avoid the same chaotic expansion experienced in the United States, the GPO proposed that it would issue a single broadcasting licence to a company jointly owned by a consortium of leading wireless receiver manufacturers, to be known as the British Broadcasting Company Ltd, which was formed on 18 October 1922. John Reith, a Scottish Calvinist, was appointed its general manager in December 1922 a few weeks after the company made its first official broadcast. L. Stanton Jefferies was its first director of music. The company was to be financed by a royalty on the sale of BBC wireless receiving sets from approved domestic manufacturers. To this day, the BBC aims to follow the Reithian directive to "inform, educate and entertain".

=== 1923–1926: From private company to public service corporation ===
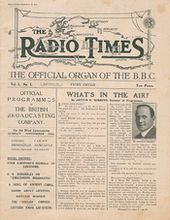
The first issue of the Radio Times (28 September 1923)

The financial arrangements soon proved inadequate. Set sales were disappointing as amateurs made their own receivers and listeners bought rival unlicensed sets. By mid-1923, discussions between the GPO and the BBC had become deadlocked and the Postmaster General commissioned a review of broadcasting by the Sykes Committee. The committee recommended a short-term reorganisation of licence fees with improved enforcement to address the BBC's immediate financial distress, and an increased share of the licence revenue split between it and the GPO. This was to be followed by a simple 10 shillings licence fee to fund broadcasts. The BBC's broadcasting monopoly was made explicit for the duration of its current broadcast licence, as was the prohibition on advertising. To avoid competition with newspapers, Fleet Street persuaded the government to ban news bulletins before 7 pm and the BBC was required to source all news from external wire services. The Radio Times, the world's first and longest-running radio and television listings magazine, was launched by Reith in September 1923. The first edition, subtitled "The official organ of the BBC", was priced at tuppence (two pence) on newsstands, and quickly sold out its run of a quarter of a million copies.

Mid-1925 found the future of broadcasting under further consideration, this time by the Crawford committee. By now the BBC, under Reith's leadership, had forged a consensus favouring a continuation of the unified (monopoly) broadcasting service, but more money was still required to finance rapid expansion. Wireless manufacturers were anxious to exit the loss-making consortium, and Reith was keen that the BBC be seen as a public service rather than a commercial enterprise. The recommendations of the Crawford Committee were published in March the following year and were still under consideration by the GPO when the 1926 United Kingdom general strike broke out in May. The strike temporarily interrupted newspaper production, and with restrictions on news bulletins waived, the BBC suddenly became the primary source of news for the duration of the crisis.

The crisis placed the BBC in a delicate position. On the one hand Reith was acutely aware that the government might exercise its right to commandeer the BBC at any time as a mouthpiece of the government if the BBC were to step out of line, but on the other he was anxious to maintain public trust by appearing to be acting independently. The government was divided on how to handle the BBC, but ended up trusting Reith, whose opposition to the strike mirrored the PM's own. Although Winston Churchill in particular wanted to commandeer the BBC to use it "to the best possible advantage", Reith wrote that Stanley Baldwin's government wanted to be able to say "that they did not commandeer [the BBC], but they know that they can trust us not to be really impartial". Thus the BBC was granted sufficient leeway to pursue the government's objectives largely in a manner of its own choosing. Supporters of the strike nicknamed the BBC the BFC for British Falsehood Company. Reith personally announced the end of the strike which he marked by reciting from Blake's "Jerusalem" signifying that England had been saved.

While the BBC tends to characterise its coverage of the general strike by emphasising the positive impression created by its balanced coverage of the views of government and strikers, Seaton has characterised the episode as the invention of "modern propaganda in its British form". Reith argued that trust gained by 'authentic impartial news' could then be used. Impartial news was not necessarily an end in itself.

The BBC did well out of the crisis, which cemented a national audience for its broadcasting, and it was followed by the Government's acceptance of the recommendation made by the Crawford Committee (1925–26) that the British Broadcasting Company be replaced by a non-commercial, Crown-chartered organisation: the British Broadcasting Corporation.

=== 1927–1939 ===
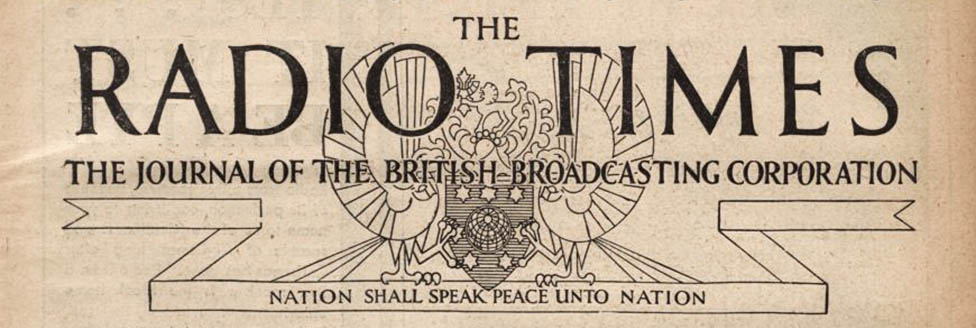
The Radio Times masthead from 25 December 1931, including the BBC motto "Nation shall speak peace unto Nation"

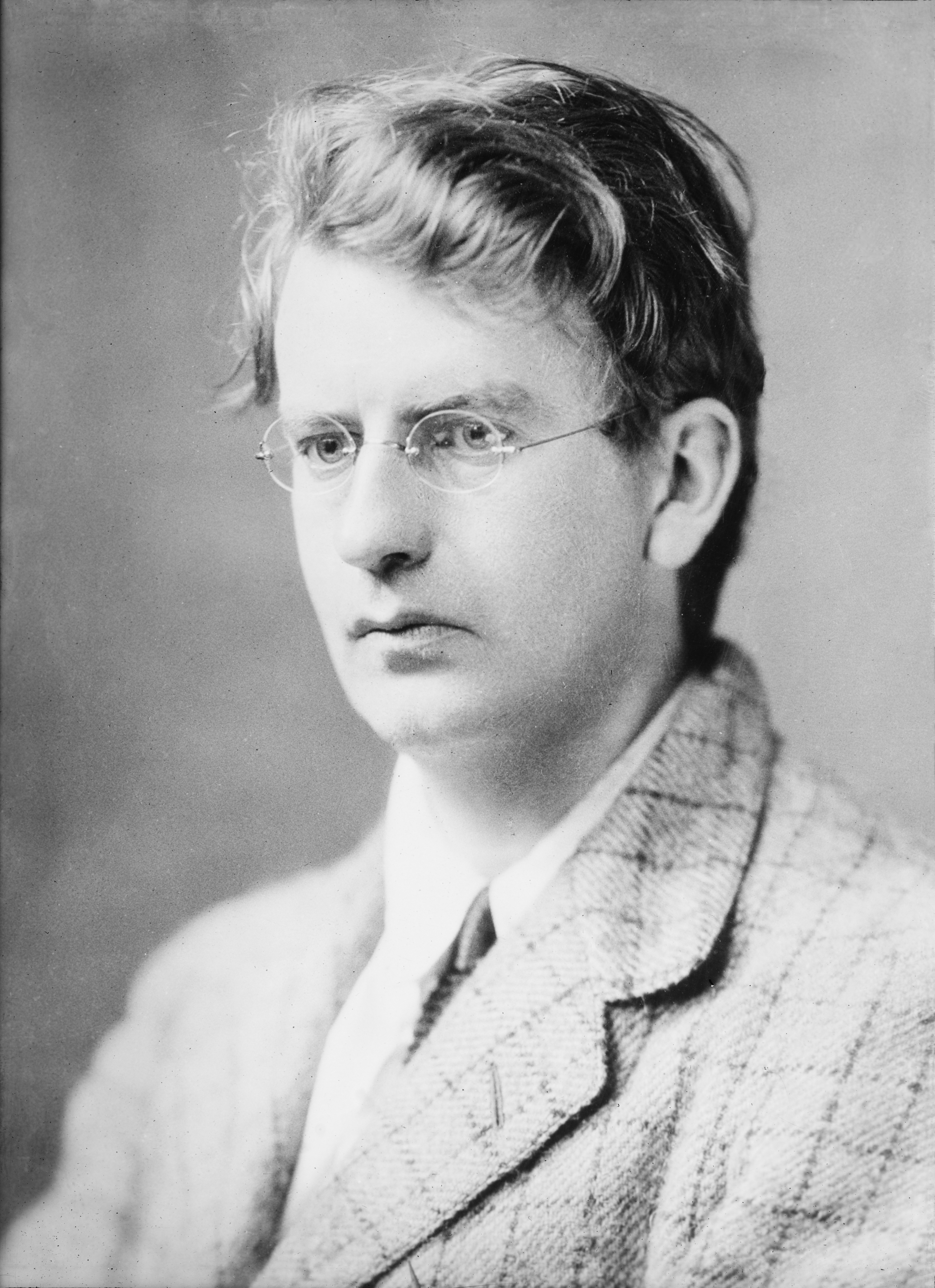
Television pioneer John Logie Baird (seen here in 1917) televised the BBC's first drama, The Man with the Flower in His Mouth, on 14 July 1930, and the first live outside broadcast, The Derby, on 2 June 1931.

The British Broadcasting Corporation came into existence on 1 January 1927, and Reith – newly knighted – was appointed its first director general. To represent its purpose and (stated) values, the new corporation adopted the coat of arms, including the motto "Nation shall speak peace unto Nation".

British radio audiences had little choice apart from BBC's programming approach. Reith was viewed as taking a moralistic approach as an executive, aiming to broadcast "all that is best in every department of human knowledge, endeavour and achievement", and putting the programming in moral or ethical terms, advocating "a high moral tone" as "obviously of paramount importance". Reith succeeded in building a high wall against a more tabloid, free-for-all in radio aimed at merely attracting the largest audience (and advertising revenue). There was no paid advertising on the BBC; all the revenue came from a tax on receiving sets. Highbrow audiences, however, greatly enjoyed it. At a time when American, Australian and Canadian stations were drawing huge audiences cheering for their local teams with the broadcast of baseball, rugby and hockey, the BBC emphasised service for a national rather than a regional audience. Boat races were well covered along with tennis and horse racing, but the BBC was reluctant to spend its severely limited air time on long football or cricket games, regardless of their popularity.

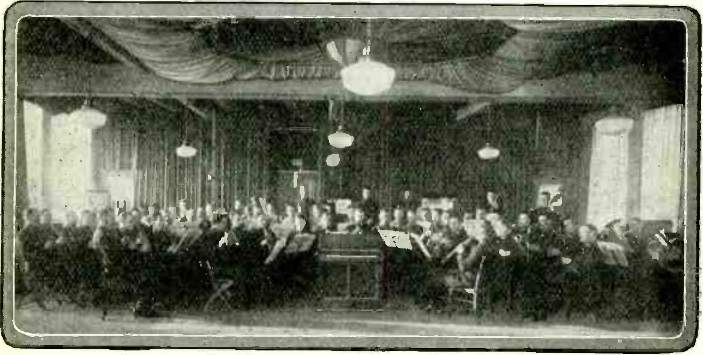
The BBC's radio studio in Birmingham, from the BBC Hand Book 1928, which described it as "Europe's largest studio"

John Reith and the BBC, with support from the Crown, determined the universal needs of the people of Britain and broadcast content according to these perceived standards. Reith effectively censored anything that he felt would be harmful, directly or indirectly. While recounting his time with the BBC in 1935, Raymond Postgate claims that BBC broadcasters were made to submit a draft of their potential broadcast for approval. It was expected that they tailored their content to accommodate the modest, church-going elderly or a member of the Clergy. Until 1928, entertainers broadcasting on the BBC, both singers and "talkers" were expected to avoid biblical quotations, Clerical impersonations and references, references to drink or Prohibition in the United States, vulgar and doubtful matter and political allusions. The BBC excluded popular foreign music and musicians from its broadcasts, while promoting British alternatives. On 5 March 1928, Stanley Baldwin, the Prime Minister, maintained the censorship of editorial opinions on public policy, but allowed the BBC to address matters of religious, political or industrial controversy. The resulting political "talk series", designed to inform England on political issues, were criticised by members of parliament, including Winston Churchill, David Lloyd George and Sir Austen Chamberlain. Those who opposed these chats claimed that they silence the opinions of those in Parliament who are not nominated by Party Leaders or Party Whips, thus stifling independent, non-official views. In October 1932, the policemen of the Metropolitan Police Federation marched in protest at a proposed pay cut. Fearing dissent within the police force and public support for the movement, the BBC censored its coverage of the events, only broadcasting official statements from the government.

Throughout the 1930s political broadcasts had been monitored by the BBC. In 1935, the BBC censored the broadcasts of Oswald Mosley and Harry Pollitt. Mosley was a leader of the British Union of Fascists, and Pollitt a leader of the Communist Party of Great Britain. They were contracted to provide a series of five broadcasts on their parties' politics. The BBC, in conjunction with The Foreign Office of Britain, suspended this series and ultimately cancelled it without the notice of the public. Some politicians faced censorship. In 1938, Winston Churchill proposed a series of talks regarding British domestic and foreign politics and affairs but was censored. The censorship of political discourse by the BBC started the shutdown of the political debate that manifested over the BBC's wartime airwaves. The Foreign Office maintained that the public should not be aware of their role in the censorship. From 1935 to 1939, the BBC attempted to unite the British Empire's radio waves, sending staff to Egypt, Palestine, Newfoundland, Jamaica, India, Canada and South Africa. Reith visited South Africa, lobbying for state-run radio programmes accepted by South African Parliament in 1936. A similar programme was adopted in Canada. Through collaboration with these state-run broadcasting centres, Reith had an influence on the culture across the empire of Great Britain with his departure from the corporation in 1938.

Experimental television broadcasts were started in 1929 using an electromechanical 30-line system developed by John Logie Baird. Limited regular broadcasts using this system began in 1932, and an expanded service (now named the BBC Television Service) started from Alexandra Palace in November 1936, alternating between an improved Baird mechanical 240-line system and the all-electronic 405-line Marconi-EMI system which had been developed by an EMI research team led by Sir Isaac Shoenberg. The superiority of the electronic system saw the mechanical system dropped early the following year, with the Marconi-EMI system the first fully electronic television system in the world to be used in regular broadcasting.

==== BBC versus other media ====
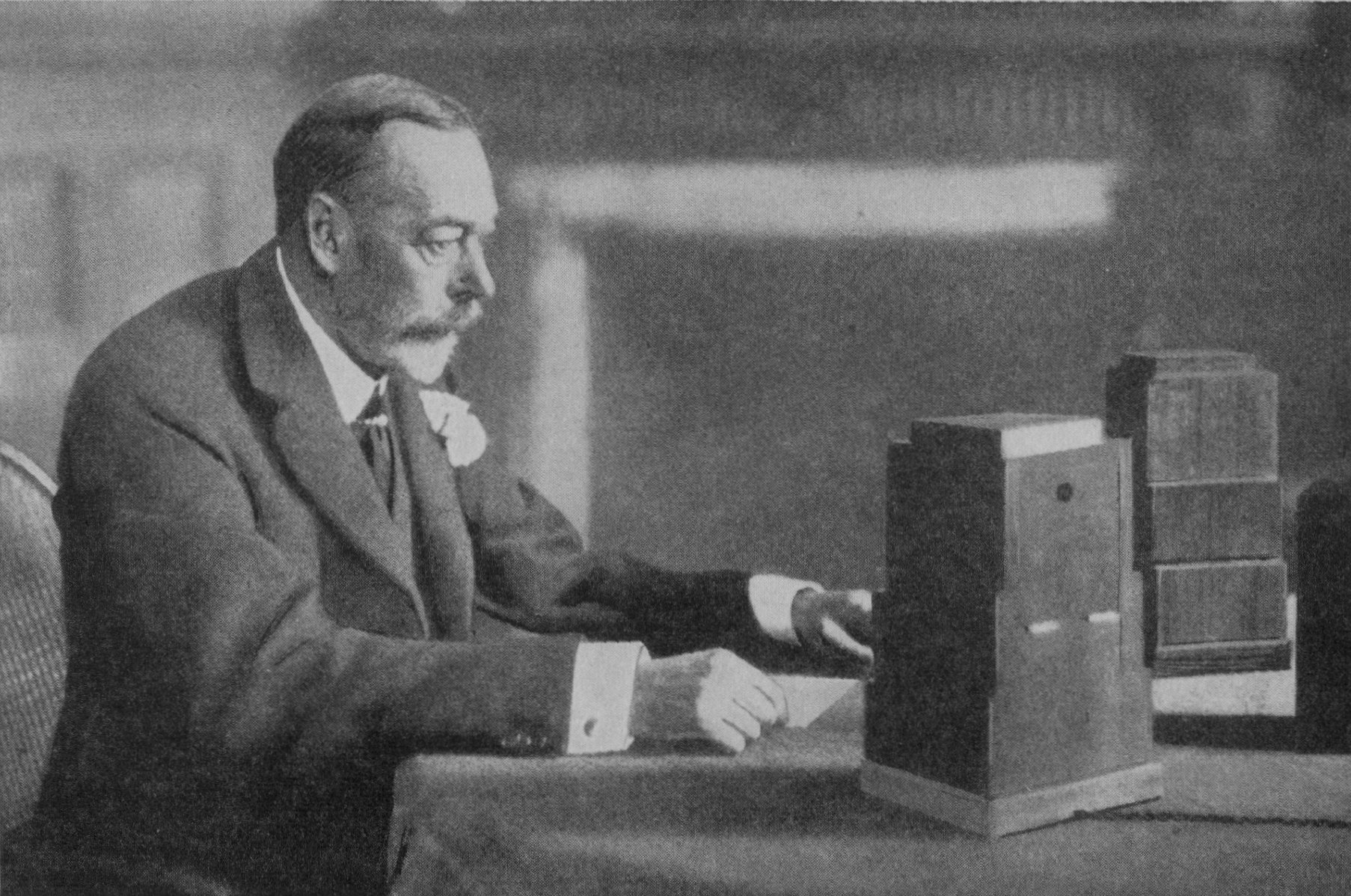
King George V giving the 1934 Royal Christmas message on BBC Radio. The annual message typically reflects on the year's major events.

The success of broadcasting provoked animosities between the BBC and well-established media such as theatres, concert halls and the recording industry. By 1929, the BBC complained that the agents of many comedians refused to sign contracts for broadcasting, because they feared it harmed the artist "by making his material stale" and that it "reduces the value of the artist as a visible music-hall performer". On the other hand, the BBC was "keenly interested" in a cooperation with the recording companies who "in recent years ... have not been slow to make records of singers, orchestras, dance bands, etc. who have already proved their power to achieve popularity by wireless." Radio plays were so popular that the BBC had received 6,000 manuscripts by 1929, most of them written for stage and of little value for broadcasting: "Day in and day out, manuscripts come in, and nearly all go out again through the post, with a note saying 'We regret, etc.'" In the 1930s music broadcasts also enjoyed great popularity, for example the friendly and wide-ranging BBC Theatre Organ broadcasts at St George's Hall, London by Reginald Foort, who held the official role of BBC Staff Theatre Organist from 1936 to 1938.

=== Second World War ===
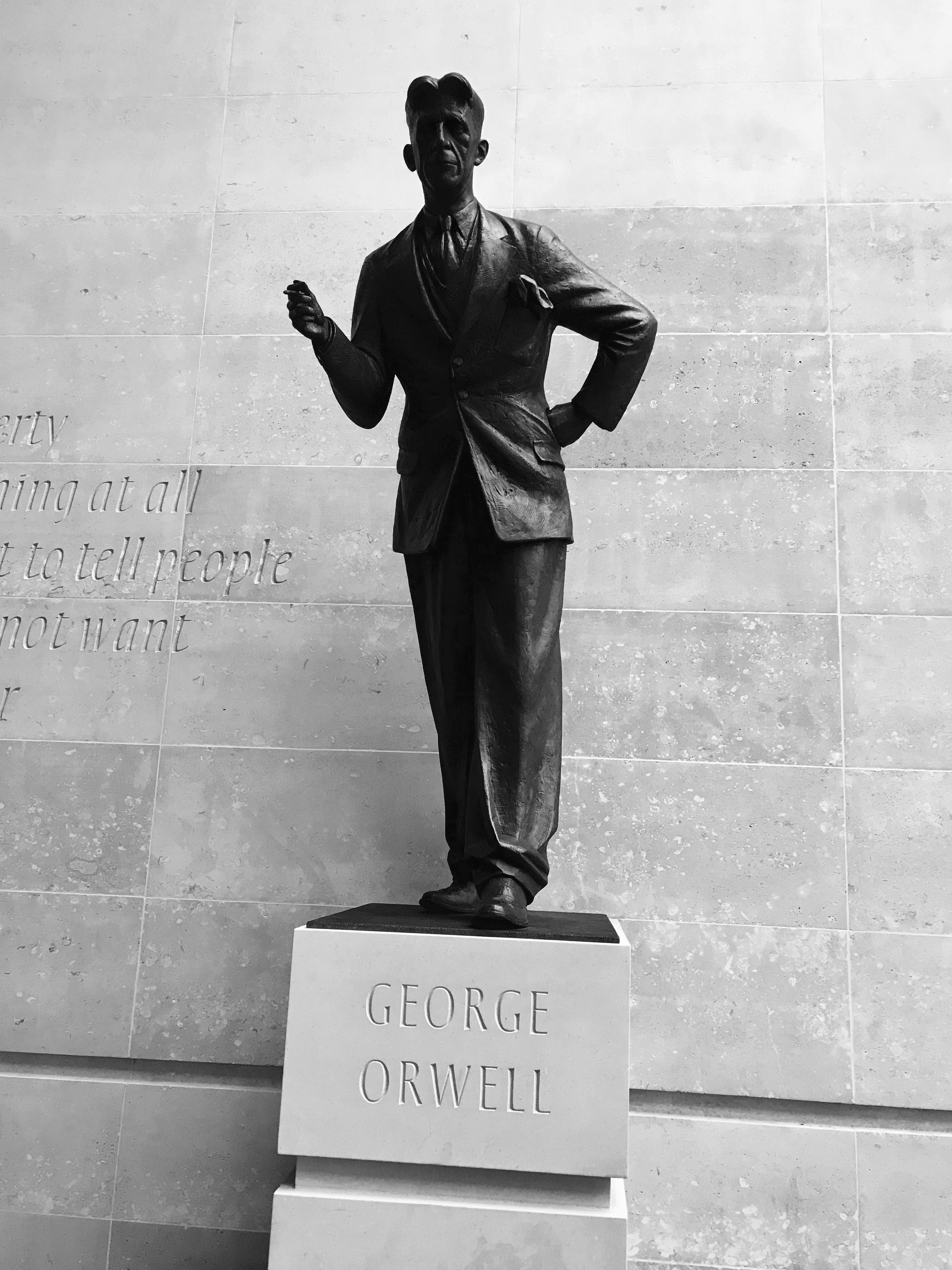
Statue of George Orwell outside Broadcasting House, headquarters of the BBC

Television broadcasting was suspended from 1 September 1939 to 7 June 1946, during World War II, and it was left to BBC Radio broadcasters such as Reginald Foort to keep the nation's spirits up. The BBC moved most of its radio operations out of London, initially to Bristol, and then to Bedford. Concerts were broadcast from the Bedford Corn Exchange; the Trinity Chapel in St Paul's Church, Bedford was the studio for the Daily Service (a daily 15-minute religious service first broadcast on the BBC in 1928 which continues today) from 1941 to 1945, and, in the darkest days of the war in 1941, the Archbishops of Canterbury and York came to St Paul's to broadcast to the UK and the world on the National Day of Prayer. BBC employees during the war included George Orwell who spent two years with the broadcaster.

During his role as prime minister during the war, Winston Churchill delivered 33 major wartime speeches by radio, all of which were carried by the BBC within the UK. On 18 June 1940, French general Charles de Gaulle, in exile in London as the leader of the Free French, made a speech, broadcast by the BBC, urging the French people not to capitulate to the Nazis. In October 1940, Princesses Elizabeth and Margaret made their first radio broadcast for the BBC's Children's Hour, addressing other children who had been evacuated from cities.

In 1938, John Reith and the Government of the United Kingdom, specifically the Ministry of Information which had been set up for WWII, designed a censorship apparatus for the inevitability of war. Due to the BBC's advancements in shortwave radio technology, the corporation could broadcast across the world during the Second World War. Within Europe, the BBC European Service would gather intelligence and information regarding the current events of the war in English. Regional BBC workers, based on their regional geo-political climate, would then further censor the material their broadcasts would cover. Nothing was to be added outside the preordained news items. For example, the BBC Polish Service was heavily censored due to fears of jeopardising relations with the Soviet Union. Controversial topics, i.e. the contested Polish and Soviet border, the deportation of Polish citizens, the arrests of Polish Home Army members and the Katyn massacre, were not included in Polish broadcasts. American radio broadcasts were broadcast across Europe on BBC channels. This material also passed through the BBC's censorship office, which surveilled and edited American coverage of British affairs. By 1940, across all BBC broadcasts, music by composers from enemy nations was censored. In total, 99 German, 38 Austrian and 38 Italian composers were censored. The BBC argued that like the Italian or German languages, listeners would be irritated by the inclusion of enemy composers. Any potential broadcasters said to have pacifist, communist or fascist ideologies were not allowed on the BBC's airwaves. In 1937, a MI5 security officer was given a permanent office within the organisation. This officer would examine the files of potential political subversives and mark the files of those deemed a security risk to the organisation, blacklisting them. This was often done on spurious grounds; even so, the practice would continue and expand during the years of the Cold War.

=== Later 20th century ===
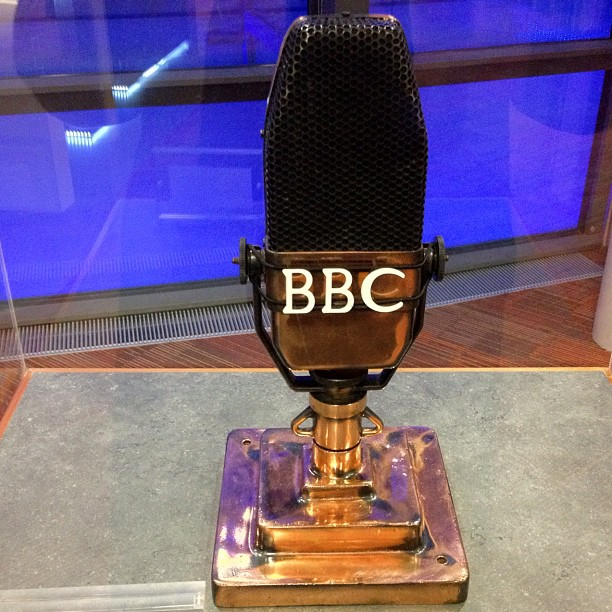
Produced between 1934 and 1959, the BBC-Marconi Type A microphone is regarded as an iconic symbol of the BBC, alongside the channel's rotating globe emblem introduced in 1963.

There was a widely reported urban myth that, upon resumption of the BBC television service after the war, announcer Leslie Mitchell started by saying, "As I was saying before we were so rudely interrupted ...". In fact, the first person to appear when transmission resumed was Jasmine Bligh and the words said were, "Good afternoon, everybody. How are you? Do you remember me, Jasmine Bligh...?" The European Broadcasting Union was formed on 12 February 1950, in Torquay with the BBC among the 23 founding broadcasting organisations.

Competition to the BBC was introduced in 1955, with the commercial and independently operated television network of Independent Television (ITV). However, the BBC monopoly on radio services would persist until 8 October 1973 when under the control of the newly renamed Independent Broadcasting Authority (IBA), the UK's first Independent local radio station, LBC came on-air in the London area. As a result of the Pilkington Committee report of 1962, in which the BBC was praised for the quality and range of its output, and ITV was very heavily criticised for not providing enough quality programming, the decision was taken to award the BBC a second television channel, BBC2, in 1964, renaming the existing service BBC1. BBC2 used the higher resolution 625-line standard which had been standardised across Europe. BBC2 was broadcast in colour from 1 July 1967 and was joined by BBC1 and ITV on 15 November 1969. The 405-line VHF transmissions of BBC1 (and ITV) were continued for compatibility with older television receivers until 1985.

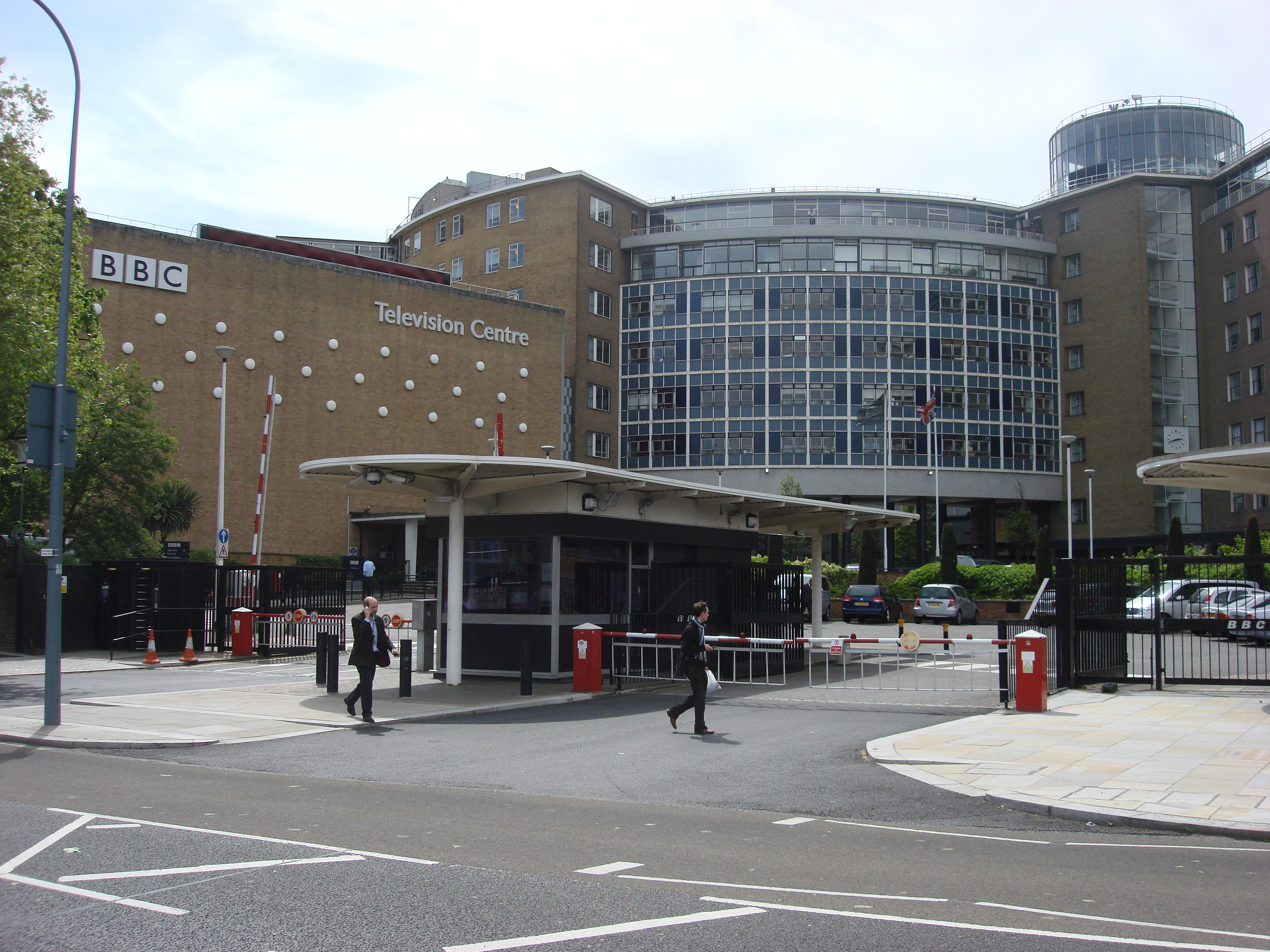
Television Centre at White City, west London (pictured in 2009), headquarters of the BBC from 1960 to 2013. Since being refurbished, the complex is now the home of BBC Studioworks.

Starting in 1964, a series of pirate radio stations (starting with Radio Caroline) came on the air and forced the British government finally to regulate radio services to permit nationally based advertising-financed services. In response, the BBC reorganised and renamed their radio channels. On 30 September 1967, the Light Programme was split into Radio 1 offering continuous "Popular" music and Radio 2 more "Easy Listening". The "Third" programme became Radio 3 offering classical music and cultural programming. The Home Service became Radio 4 offering news, and non-musical content such as quiz shows, readings, dramas and plays. As well as the four national channels, a series of local BBC radio stations were established in 1967, including Radio London. In 1969, the BBC Enterprises department was formed to exploit BBC brands and programmes for commercial spin-off products. In 1979, it became a wholly owned limited company, BBC Enterprises Ltd.

In 1974 the BBC's teletext service, Ceefax, was introduced, created initially to provide subtitling, but developed into a news and information service. In 1978, BBC staff went on strike just before the Christmas, thus blocking out the transmission of both channels and amalgamating all four radio stations into one. Since the deregulation of the UK television and radio market in the 1980s, the BBC has faced increased competition from the commercial sector (and from the advertiser-funded public service broadcaster Channel 4), especially on satellite television, cable television, and digital television services. In the late 1980s, the BBC began a process of divestment by spinning off and selling parts of its organisation. In 1988, it sold off the Hulton Press Library, a photographic archive which had been acquired from the Picture Post magazine by the BBC in 1957. The archive was sold to Brian Deutsch and is now owned by Getty Images. In 1987, the BBC decided to centralise its operations by the management team with the radio and television divisions joining forces together for the first time, the activities of the news and currents departments and coordinated jointly under the new directorate. During the 1990s, this process continued with the separation of certain operational arms of the corporation into autonomous but wholly owned subsidiaries, with the aim of generating additional revenue for programme-making. BBC Enterprises was reorganised and relaunched in 1995, as BBC Worldwide Ltd. In 1998, BBC studios, outside broadcasts, post production, design, costumes and wigs were spun off into BBC Resources Ltd.

The BBC Research & Development has played a major part in the development of broadcasting and recording techniques. The BBC was also responsible for the development of the NICAM stereo standard. In recent decades, a number of additional channels and radio stations have been launched: Radio 5 was launched in 1990, as a sports and educational station, but was replaced in 1994, with BBC Radio 5 Live to become a live radio station, following the success of the Radio 4 service to cover the 1991 Gulf War. The new station would be a news and sport station. In 1997, BBC News 24, a rolling news channel, launched on digital television services, and the following year, BBC Choice was launched as the third general entertainment channel from the BBC. The BBC also purchased The Parliamentary Channel, which was renamed BBC Parliament. In 1999, BBC Knowledge launched as a multimedia channel, with services available on the newly launched BBC Text digital teletext service (later rebranded as BBC Red Button), and on BBC Online. The channel had an educational aim, which was modified later on in its life to offer documentaries.

=== 2000–2011 ===
==== Channel and branding changes ====
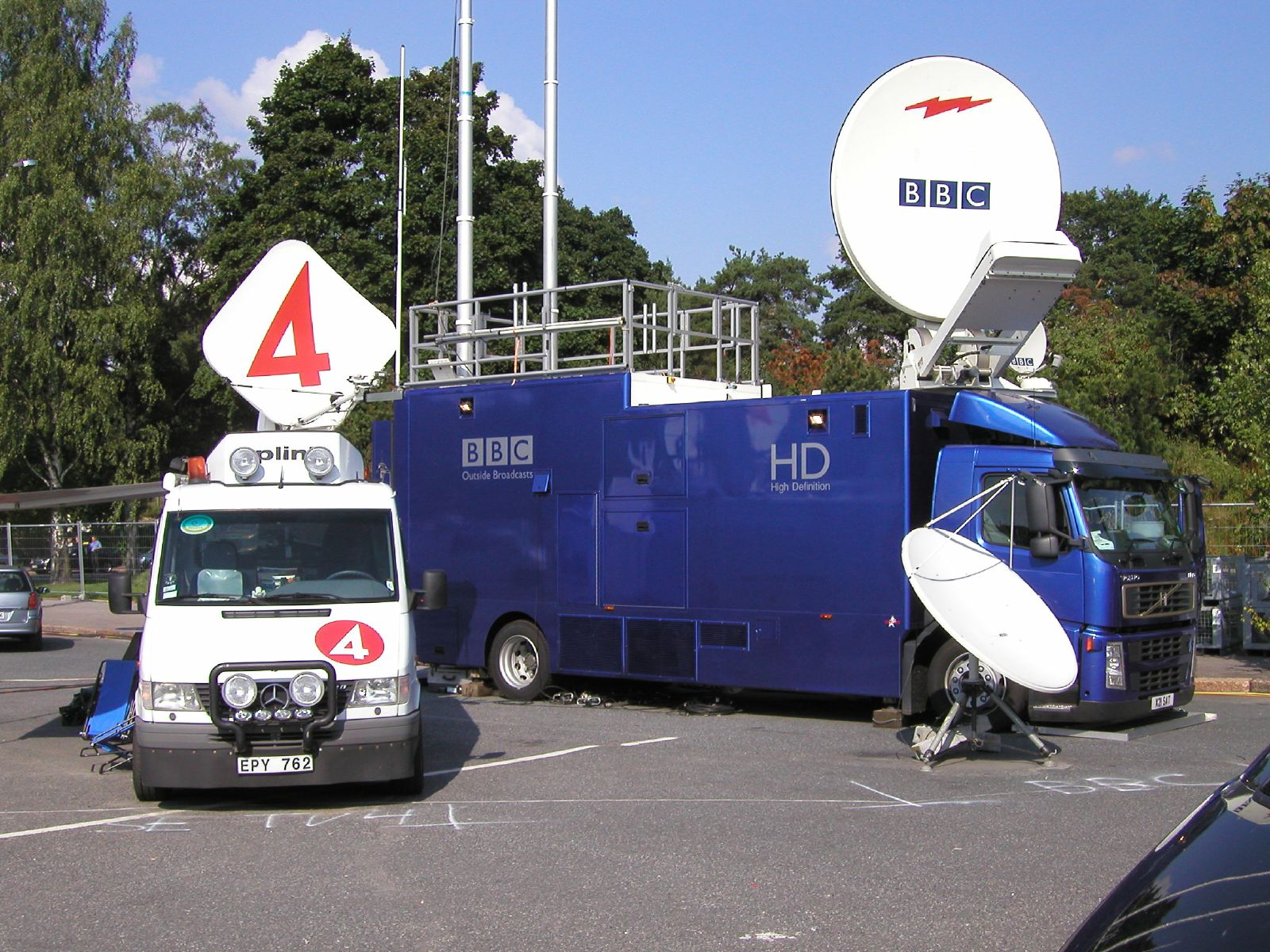
A BBC HD outside broadcast van in August 2005

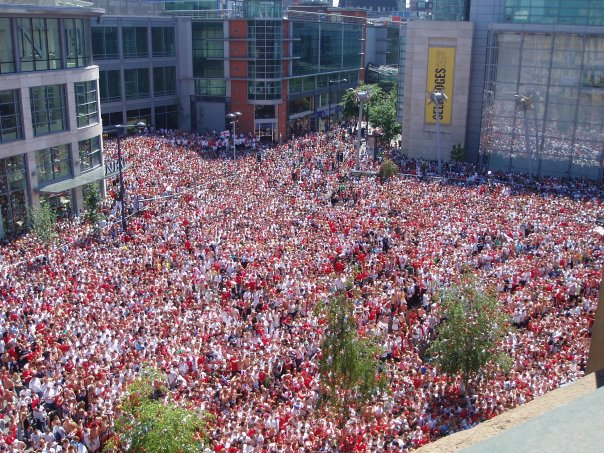
England fans in Manchester during a 2006 FIFA World Cup game shown on the BBC Big Screen

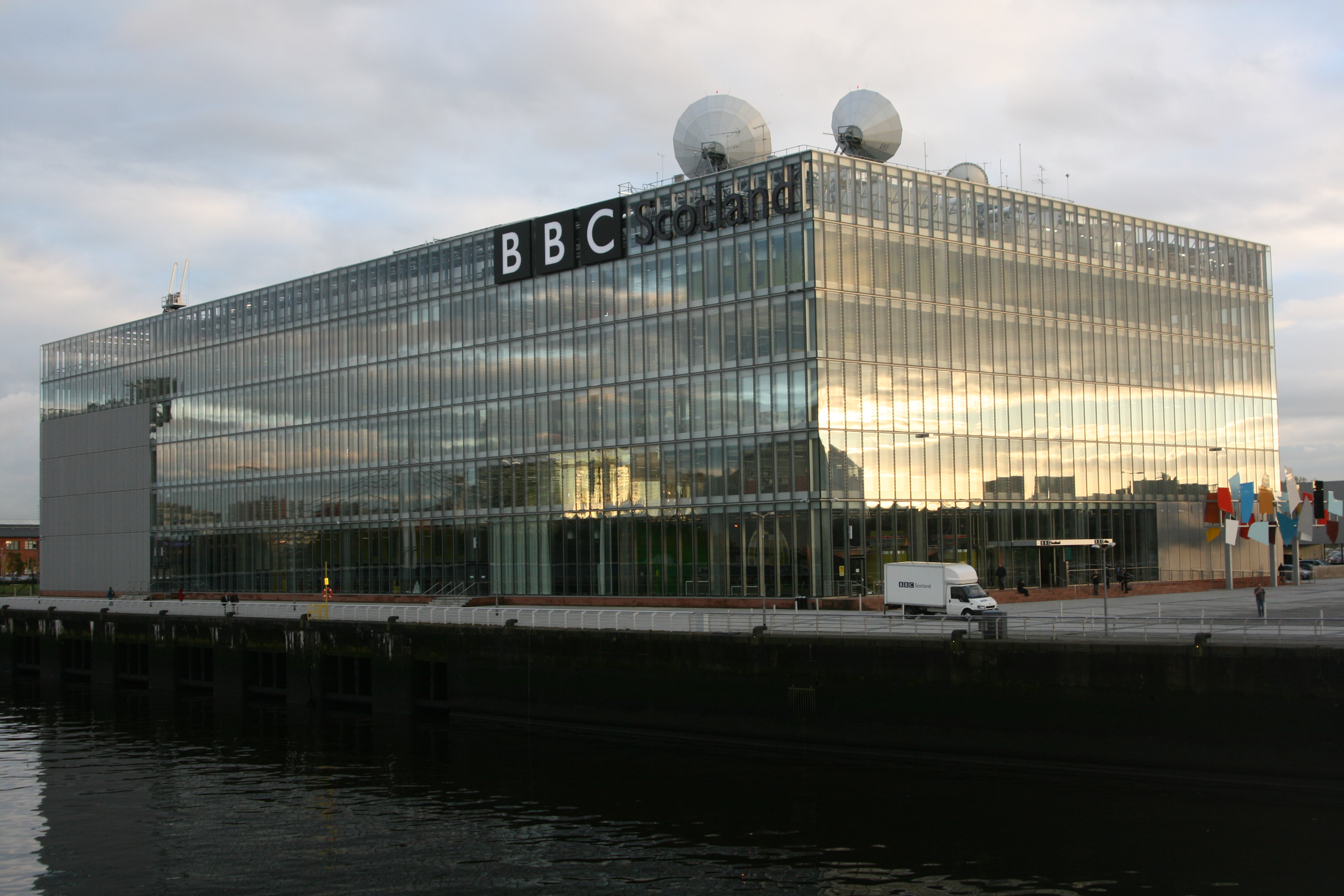
BBC Pacific Quay in Glasgow, which was opened in 2007

In 2002 several television and radio channels were reorganised. BBC Knowledge was replaced by BBC Four and became the BBC's arts and documentaries channel. CBBC, which had been a programming strand as Children's BBC since 1985, was split into CBBC and CBeebies, for younger children, with both new services getting a digital channel: the CBBC Channel and CBeebies Channel. In addition to the television channels, new digital radio stations were created: 1Xtra, 6 Music and Radio 4 Extra. BBC 1Xtra was a sister station to Radio 1 and specialised in modern black music, BBC 6 Music specialised in alternative music genres and BBC7 specialised in archive, speech and children's programming.

The following few years resulted in repositioning of some channels to conform to a larger brand: in 2003, BBC Choice was replaced by BBC Three, with programming for younger adults and shocking real-life documentaries, BBC News 24 became the BBC News Channel in 2008, and BBC Radio 7 became BBC Radio 4 Extra in 2011, with new programmes to supplement those broadcast on Radio 4. In 2008, another channel was launched, BBC Alba, a Scottish Gaelic service.

In 2006 BBC HD was launched as an experimental service, becoming official in December 2007. The channel broadcast HD simulcasts of programmes on BBC One, BBC Two, BBC Three and BBC Four as well as repeats of some older programmes in HD. In 2010, an HD simulcast of BBC One launched: BBC One HD. The channel uses HD versions of BBC One's schedule and uses upscaled versions of programmes not currently produced in HD. The BBC HD channel closed in March 2013 and was replaced by BBC Two HD in the same month.

The 2004 Hutton Inquiry and the subsequent report raised questions about the BBC's journalistic standards and its impartiality. This led to resignations of senior management members at the time including the then Director General, Greg Dyke. In January 2007, the BBC released minutes of the board meeting which led to Greg Dyke's resignation.

==== Sale of divisions ====
During this decade the corporation began to sell off a number of its operational divisions to private owners: BBC Broadcast was spun off as a separate company in 2002, and in 2005, it was sold off to Australian-based Macquarie Capital Alliance Group and Macquarie Group Limited and rebranded Red Bee Media. The BBC's IT, telephony and broadcast technology were brought together as BBC Technology Ltd in 2001, and the division was later sold to the German company Siemens IT Solutions and Services (SIS). SIS was subsequently acquired from Siemens by the French company Atos. Further divestments included BBC Books (sold to Random House in 2006); BBC Outside Broadcasts Ltd (sold in 2008 to Satellite Information Services); Costumes and Wigs (stock sold in 2008 to Angels Costumes); and BBC Magazines (sold to Immediate Media Company in 2011). After the sales of OBs and costumes, the remainder of BBC Resources was reorganised as BBC Studios and Post Production, which continues today as a wholly owned subsidiary of the BBC.

==== Creative Futures ====
On 7 March 2005 director general Mark Thompson launched the "Creative Futures" project to restructure the organisation. A strike in May 2005 by more than 11,000 BBC workers over a proposal to cut 4,000 jobs and to privatise parts of the BBC, disrupted much of the BBC's regular programming.

The blueprint for the future of the BBC resulting from the project was published ion 25 April 2006. On 18 October 2007, Thompson announced a six-year plan, "Delivering Creative Futures", which included merging the television current affairs department into a new "News Programmes" division. Thompson's announcement, in response to a £2 billion shortfall in funding, would, he said, deliver "a smaller but fitter BBC" in the digital age, by cutting its payroll and, in 2013, selling Television Centre. The plans included a reduction in posts of 2,500; including 1,800 redundancies, consolidating news operations, reducing programming output by 10% and selling off the flagship Television Centre building in London.

==== Licence fee frozen ====
On 20 October 2010 the Chancellor of the Exchequer George Osborne announced that the television licence fee would be frozen at its current level until the end of the current charter in 2016. The same announcement revealed that the BBC would take on the full cost of running the BBC World Service and the BBC Monitoring service from the Foreign, Commonwealth and Development Office, and partially finance the Welsh broadcaster S4C. (Note: Unlike the other departments of the BBC, the BBC World Service had been funded by the Foreign, Commonwealth and Development Office (aka Foreign Office or the FCO), is the British government department responsible for promoting the interests of the United Kingdom abroad.)

=== Since 2011 ===
==== Relocations ====
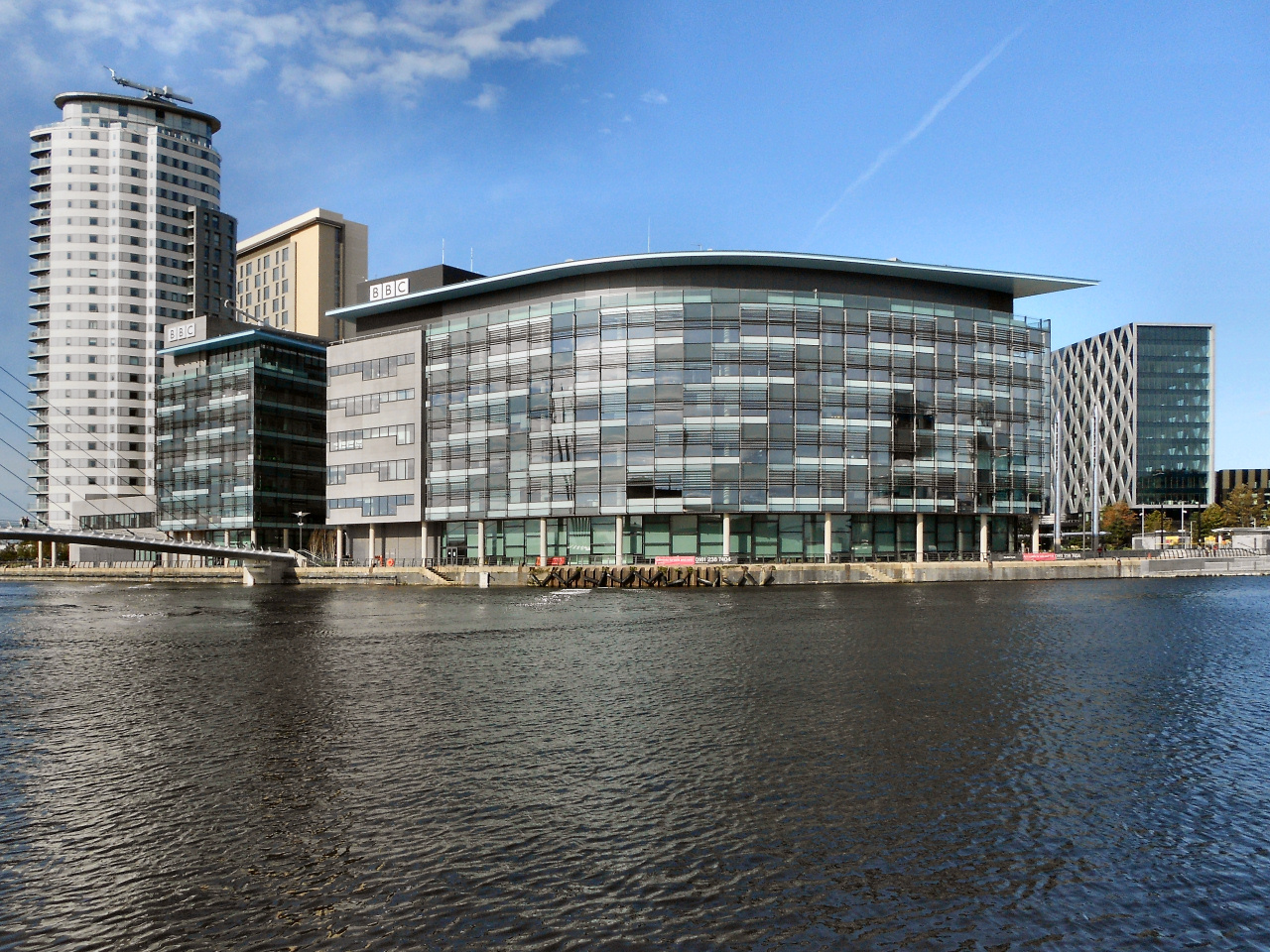
Quay House (centre) and Bridge House (left), MediaCityUK, were occupied by the BBC from 2011.

Following the 2007 announcement of the impending closure and selling off of BBC Television Centre, as part of the Delivering Creative Futures initiative announced by Mark Thompson, new production bases were occupied gradually between 2011 and 2013. The BBC's occupancy at the MediaCityUK development in Salford became operational in May 2011 having been reported as early as November 2003. The complex would house BBC Radio 5 Live and 5 Live Sports Extra, BBC Sport, BBC Breakfast, BBC Children's and Education and parts of BBC Research & Development - all moving from London. Moreover, the departments formerly housed at New Broadcasting House on Wilmslow Road in Manchester which closed in November that year including the production base BBC Manchester, BBC North West, BBC Radio Manchester and BBC Philharmonic. Programmes including BBC Radio 4's You and Yours, Woman's Hour and File on 4 also began production at the base. Approximately 2,500 jobs had moved out of London to Salford as part of the occupancy by July 2014, with the move generally praised for its improved diversity of voices and locations on screen and overall cost control of the move, being on time and on budget, but criticised for some relocation packages being too generous and the increased cost of staff travelling between London and Manchester. The sale of their former Manchester headquarters raised £10.3 million.

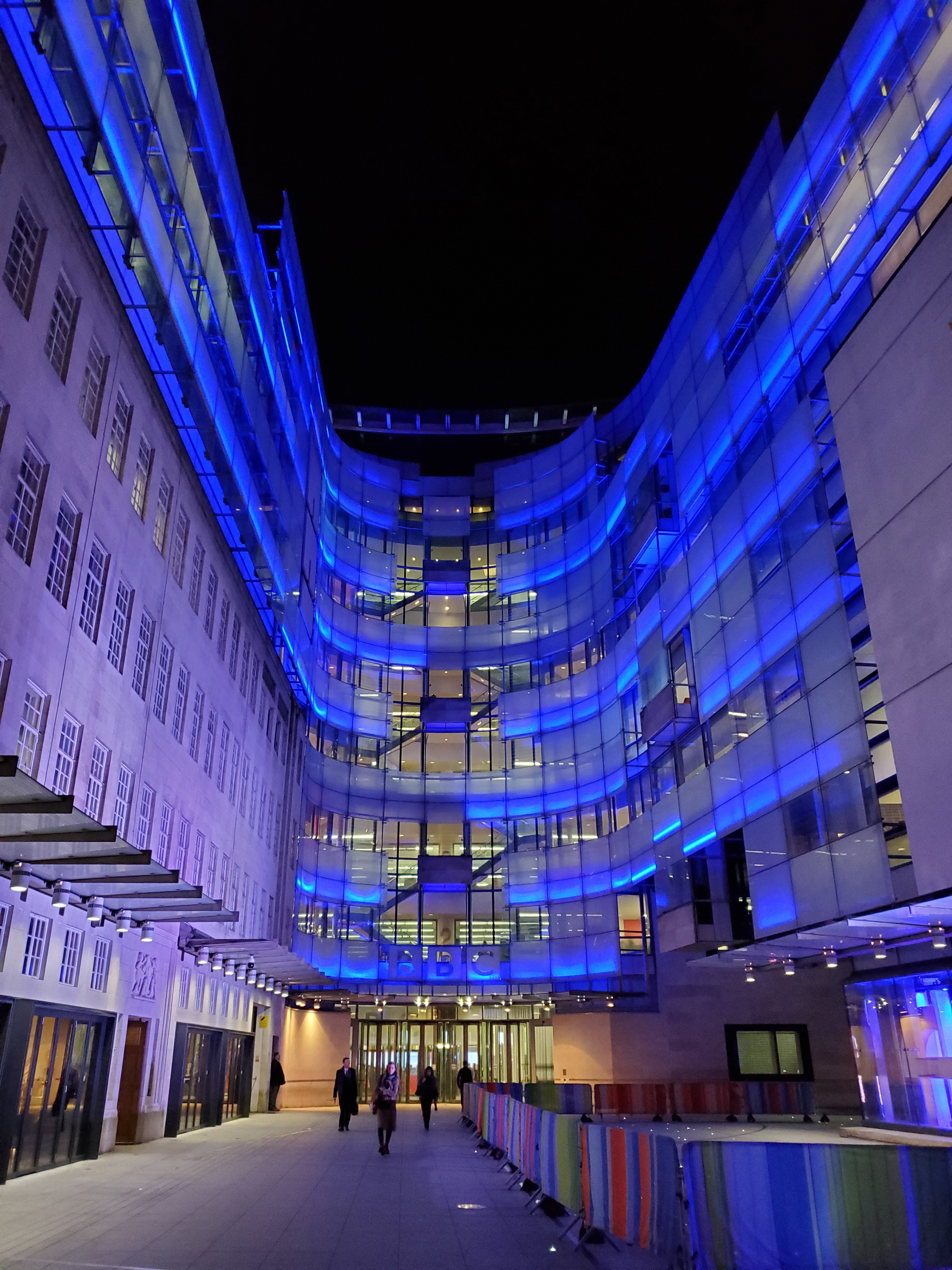
The new extension to the BBC's Broadcasting House, completed in 2012

On 7 June 2013, the BBC's refurbished and extended headquarters at Broadcasting House in central London was opened by HM The Queen bringing to a conclusion a project that had been ongoing since 2002. Comprising a refurbishment of the historic 1932 structure, a newly constructed wing mirroring the original completed in 2005, and a large extension to the rear of both buildings, joining both and creating a plaza between them, the project cost £1.04 billion. At opening, the building would house more than 30 domestic and BBC World Service radio stations including BBC Radio's 1, 1Xtra, 3, 4 and 4 extra, three 24-hour TV news channels (BBC News, BBC World News and BBC Arabic), all of the BBC's main news bulletins and is the workplace for 6,000 BBC staff from the BBC's television, radio, news and online services. BBC Radio 2 and 6 Music would move into the building in February 2024.

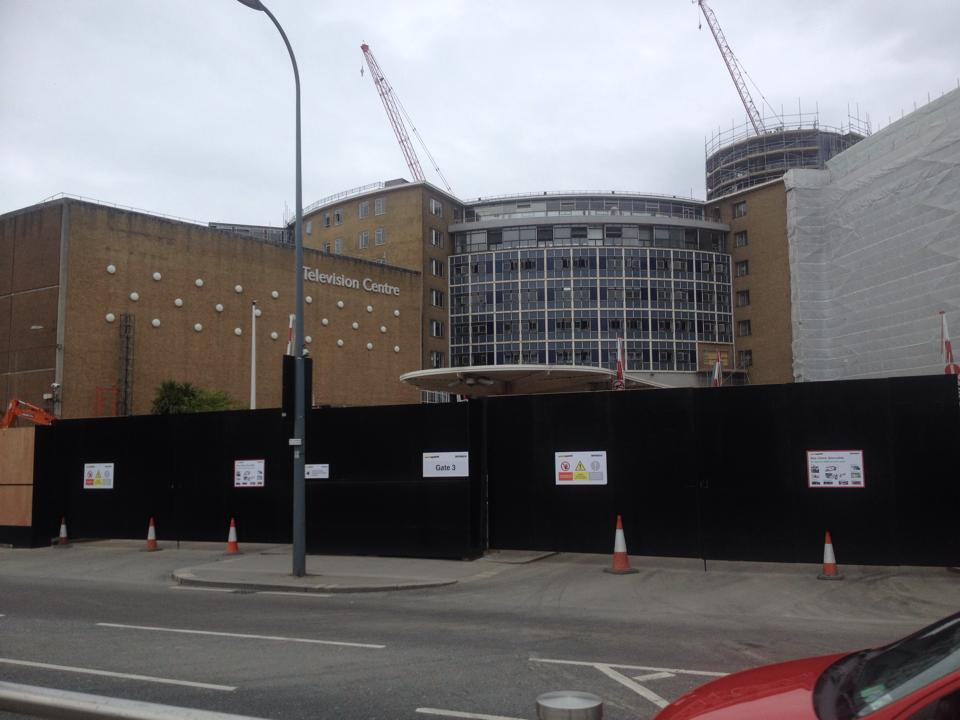
Television Centre, pictured in 2015 during redevelopment.

These major re-locations have come alongside the closure of a number of other facilities, studios and buildings, most notably the closure of BBC Television Centre as all departments formerly held within the building were transferred to MediaCityUK or Broadcasting House, with the final BBC News broadcast from the site on 18 March 2013. The site was sold in July 2012 to property developer Stanhope plc for £200 million in a highly controversial move criticised by current and former BBC stars and staff. The site was finally handed over in September 2014 which saw the majority of the building converted or re-developed into 950 homes. Three studios and associated dressing rooms and support areas were retained, leased by commercial subsidiary BBC Studios and Post Production, later BBC Studioworks and commercial offices facing Wood Lane being leased to commercial distribution arm BBC Worldwide later BBC Studios.

The disposal of Television Centre saved the BBC £30 million annually in running costs and contributed to the £90 million in annual cost savings achieved through property efficiency between 2011 and 2018. Additional buildings disposed of around this time include:

- 35 Marylebone High Street, lease vacated in 2009 when BBC Radio London moved to Broadcasting House
- Kingswood Warren sold in 2010 to developer Octagon
- Henry Wood House, lease vacated c.2012
- Bush House, lease vacated 2012 when the BBC World Service moved to Broadcasting House. Releasing the leases of Bush House, Henry Wood House and Marylebone High St. saved £19 million per annum in operating costs.
- White City 1, closed in March 2013 which along with Media Centre and Garden House were sold to developers in 2015 for £87 million and saving £33 million annually in running costs.
- London buildings Grafton House, Brock House, Great Portland Street, and Euston Square were all vacated in 2017/18.
- Caversham Park was vacated in November 2018 as BBC Monitoring relocated to Broadcasting House and BBC Radio Berkshire moved to Thames Valley Park.
- Wogan House was vacated in February 2024 as BBC Radio 2 and BBC Radio 6 Music moved to Broadcasting House.

Announced in June 2018, the BBC's music studios at Maida Vale, housing the BBC Symphony Orchestra, BBC Singers and hosting live sessions for BBC Radio's 1, 2, 3 and 6 Music would close. The studios were identified for closure as early as 2007 and cited as being run-down, inappropriately located in a residential area, and "wholly unsuitable for the 21st century", with the final session recorded in July 2026. The site placed on the market for £10.5 million in November 2022 and sold in August 2023 with the occupiers of Maida Vale moving to a new BBC Music Studio in the East Bank of Queen Elizabeth Olympic Park by 2027.

==== Budget cuts ====
Further cuts were announced on 6 October 2011, so the BBC could reach a total reduction in their budget of 20%, following the licence fee freeze in October 2010. This included cutting staff by 2,000 and sending a further 1,000 to the MediaCityUK development in Salford, with BBC Three moving to Salford in 2016, the sharing of more programmes between stations and channels, sharing of radio news bulletins, more repeats in schedules including the whole of BBC Two daytime and for some original programming to be reduced. However, flagship programmes, broadcast channels outside of BBC HD and full funding for CBBC and CBeebies would be retained.

In 2016 the BBC Director General Tony Hall announced a savings target of £800 million per year by 2021, which is about 23% of annual licence fee revenue. Having to take on the £700 million cost for free TV licences for the over-75 pensioners, and rapid inflation in drama and sport coverage costs, was given as the reason. Duplication of management and content spending would be reduced, and there would be a review of BBC News.

In 2020 the BBC announced a BBC News savings target of £80 million per year by 2022, involving about 520 staff reductions. The BBC's director of news and current affairs Fran Unsworth said there would be further moves toward digital broadcasting, in part to attract back a youth audience, and more pooling of reporters to stop separate teams covering the same news. In 2020, the BBC reported a £119 million deficit because of delays to cost reduction plans, and the forthcoming ending of the remaining £253 million funding towards pensioner licence fees would increase financial pressures.

In February 2026, Davie stated that due to decreasing licence fee revenue and other factors, the BBC would have to cut 10% (around £400–600 million) of its costs over the next three years. A spokesperson stated that the broadcaster was facing "substantial financial pressures" and needed to be "more productive and prioritising our offer to audiences to ensure we’re providing the best value for money, both now and in the future." On 15 April 2026, the BBC announced cuts up to 2,000 jobs—its largest layoffs in over a decade—to reduce costs by about 10% (around £500 million) over the next two years. Some of these cuts began to occur in October 2026, including the cancellation of multiple programmes across radio and television, plans to close BBC Three, the BBC Scotland channel, and BBC Radio 4 Extra in 2027, and a move by chief content officer Kate Phillips to consolidate its commissioning teams between radio and television (which will result in cuts to 100 content positions).

==== Service changes ====
BBC HD was closed on 26 March 2013 and replaced with an HD simulcast of BBC Two.

The logo of BBC Sounds as launched in 2018 and in use until 2021.

Radio services and programmes began to be made available online initially through the BBC iPlayer Radio service in October 2012 available online and as an app for smartphones. The corporation was criticised for lagging behind competitors in that area, while the developers blamed issues with Adobe Flash for the delay in rolling out apps. After tests including the BBC Radio Explorer, the service was re-built and re-launched in October 2018 as BBC Sounds housing radio, music mixes and podcasts in one app. The Sounds app had a much heavier focus on podcasts and the audio offerings of the corporation in an effort to attract younger audiences in addition to the existing radio listeners iPlayer Radio had gathered.

The BBC Three logo in use while the service was run as digital only and shaped to suit app icons and social media.

On 16 February 2016, the BBC Three broadcast television service was discontinued and replaced by a digital outlet under the same name, targeting its young adult audience with web series and other content. This decision was reversed in 2021 and the service re-launched as a linear broadcast channel in February 2022 amid a wish for successful programmes to be able to reach a mass audience of young people and criticism the move online had 'failed' viewers in words of Julian Knight MP.

In February 2017, BBC director general Lord Hall announced a plan to replace BBC Two Scotland with a new, part-time BBC Scotland television channel, focused exclusively on Scottish programming and featuring an hour-long news programme covering national and international headlines from a Scottish perspective and seen to counter the frequent proposals for a Scotland opt-out of the BBC News at Six. Ofcom granted approval in June 2018 and the BBC Scotland channel launched in February 2019.

Rumoured from November 2019, the corporation began planning a number of radio station streams broadcasting on BBC Sounds to complement existing stations with specific themed content. While the corporation claimed they were exploring ways of better serving audiences, commercial competitors complained it was a way of attracting listeners and copying existing formats. The first to launch was BBC Radio 1 Dance in October 2020, organising existing dance shows into one stream, and was followed in April 2021 by BBC Radio 1 Relax in the COVID-19 pandemic with a focus on relaxing and well-being programming. In February 2024, the BBC announced more expansive plans including the launch of three new stations on BBC Sounds and on DAB+ and the expansion of two more existing stations onto the DAB+ platform subject to Ofcom approval and the completion of a Public Interest Test. BBC Radio 1 Anthems, focusing on acts supported by Radio 1 in the 2000s and 2010s, and BBC Radio 3 Unwind, providing classical music to help listeners escape pressures of daily life, and expanding Radio 1 Dance onto DAB+ were all given the go-ahead and Radio 1 Anthems and Radio 3 Unwind launched in November 2024. However, a Radio 2 spin-off, focusing on music from the 1950s, 60s and 70s, and expanding BBC Radio 5 Live Sports Extra to play sports related audio including from the Nations and Regions when live sport is not broadcast on the station rather than a promotional audio loop were both denied by Ofcom in July 2025. The regulator concluded that the proposed stations "would create a significant adverse impact on fair and effective competition" citing particular significance on Boom Radio in the case of the Radio 2 spin-off and the talkSPORT network in the case of 5 Live Sports Extra.

In October 2024, it was announced that the BBC along with Sky Sports had signed a deal to broadcast the 2025–26 season of the Women's Super League campaign. This would not only dramatically increase the revenue available to league, but also represents the sharing of rights between broadcasters to share costs and ensure matches remain visible on free-to-air television.

In May 2025, BBC director general Tim Davie said there were plans to switch off traditional broadcast transmissions in the 2030s to transition to a fully online delivery of programmes.

On 20 October 2026, as part of a programme of budget cuts, the BBC announced that it would close BBC Radio 4 Extra, BBC Three, and the BBC Scotland channel in 2027; some of their content will be dispersed to Sounds, iPlayer, and BBC One and Two in Scotland respectively.

==== Charter changes and focus on trust ====
Under the new royal charter instituted in 2017, the corporation must publish an annual report to Ofcom, outlining its plans and public service obligations for the next year. In its 2017–18 report, released July 2017, the BBC announced plans to "re-invent" its output to better compete against commercial streaming services such as Netflix. These plans included increasing the diversity of its content on television and radio, a major increase in investments towards digital children's content, and plans to make larger investments in Wales, Scotland and Northern Ireland to "rise to the challenge of better reflecting and representing a changing UK".

Since 2017, the BBC has funded the Local Democracy Reporting Service, with up to 165 journalists employed by independent news organisations to report on local democracy issues on a pooled basis. In September 2019, the BBC launched the Trusted News Initiative to work with news and social media companies to combat disinformation about national elections.

In March 2023 the BBC was at the centre of a political row with football pundit Gary Lineker, after he criticised the British government's asylum policy on social media, seemingly undermining trust in the corporation. Lineker was suspended from his position on Match of the Day before being re-instated after receiving overwhelming support from his colleagues. The scandal was made worse due to the connections between BBC's chairman, Richard Sharp, and the Conservative Party.

The next month, in April 2023, Richard Sharp resigned as chairman after a report found he did not disclose potential perceived conflicts of interest in his role in the facilitation of a loan to Prime Minister Boris Johnson. Dame Elan Closs Stephens was appointed as acting chairwoman on 27 June 2023, and she would lead the BBC board for a year or until a new permanent chair has been appointed. Samir Shah was subsequently appointed with effect from 4 March 2024.

Tom Edgington, BBC Verify senior journalist in the studio.

In May 2023, the BBC Verify brand was launched by BBC News to "fact-check information, verify video, counter disinformation, and analyse data" through specific articles, sections on existing articles analysing opinions expressed, and videos examining complex topics. In 2025, this was expanded to a live-feed on the BBC News website throughout the day. The provision of the service included the use of civil service statisticians, which came into question in October 2026 when an article by The Telegraph claimed that these civil servants were involved in editorial decisions and in breach of impartiality rules, leading to a recruitment pause. A November 2024 report by the media regulator Ofcom into misinformation revealed around a quarter of UK adults said they have used a fact checker website or tool at least once, with BBC Verify named the most likely to be used and heard of, with one in five saying they use it at least once, and one in twenty saying they do so regularly.

In November 2025, following the leaking of a report that alleged systemic bias within the BBC, Tim Davie resigned as Director-General along with Deborah Turness as CEO of News within the organisation. On 25 March 2026, former Google executive Matt Brittin was appointed as the new Director-General.

On 16 December 2025, the UK government considered a green paper of new ways to fund the BBC, such as replacing the television licence with either advertising or a subscription model.

== Governance ==
The BBC is a chartered corporation, independent from direct government intervention, with its activities being overseen from April 2017 by the BBC Board and regulated by Ofcom. The chairman is Samir Shah.

=== Charter and Agreement ===
The BBC is a public broadcasting company that operates under a royal charter. The charter is the constitutional basis for the BBC, and sets out the BBC's object, mission and public purposes. It emphasises public service, (limited) (Note: The BBC itself wrote on the matter (in about 2005) that it can not "express its own editorial opinion about current affairs or matters of public policy", and that that "is not to say, of course, that controversial programmes are never broadcast, but great care is taken to ensure that arguments are well balanced.") editorial independence, prohibits advertising on domestic services and proclaims the BBC is to "seek to avoid adverse impacts on competition which are not necessary for the effective fulfilment of the Mission and the promotion of the Public Purposes".

The charter additionally sets out that the BBC is subject to an additional agreement between it and the Culture Secretary, and that its operating licence is to be set by Ofcom, an external regulatory body. It used to be that the Home Secretary be departmental to both the agreement as well as the licence, and regulatory duties fall to the BBC Trust, but the 2017 charter changed those 2007 arrangements.

The charter also outlines the BBC's governance and regulatory arrangements as a statutory corporation, including the role and composition of the BBC Board. The current charter took effect on 1 January 2017 and is set to expire on 31 December 2027; the agreement being coterminous.

=== BBC Board ===
The BBC Board was formed in April 2017. It replaced the previous governing body, the BBC Trust, which itself had replaced the board of governors in 2007. The board sets the strategy for the corporation, assesses the performance of the BBC's executive board in delivering the BBC's services, and appoints the director-general. Ofcom is responsible for the regulation of the BBC. Samir Shah has served as the chairman since 4 March 2024.

=== Executive committee ===
The executive committee is responsible for the day-to-day operations of the broadcaster. Consisting of senior managers of the BBC, the committee meets once per month and is responsible for operational management and delivery of services within a framework set by the board, and is chaired by the director-general, who is chief executive and (from 1994) editor-in-chief.

Name	Position
Matt Brittin	Director-General (chair)
Rhodri Talfan Davies	Deputy Director-General
Kerris Bright	Chief Customer Officer
Alan Dickson	Chief Financial Officer
Tom Fussell	CEO, BBC Studios
Leigh Tavaziva	Chief Operating Officer
Charlotte Moore	Chief Content Officer
Uzair Qadeer	Chief People Officer
Alice Macandrew	Group Corporate Affairs Director
Gautam Rangarajan	Group Director of Strategy and Performance
Rhuanedd Richards	Interim Director of Nations
vacant	CEO, BBC News and Current Affairs

=== Operational divisions ===
The corporation has the following in-house divisions covering the BBC's output and operations:

- Content, headed by Charlotte Moore is in charge of the corporation's television channels including the commissioning of programming.
- Nations and Regions, headed by Rhodri Talfan Davies is responsible for the corporation's divisions in Scotland, Northern Ireland, Wales, and the English Regions.

=== Commercial divisions ===
The BBC also operates a number of wholly owned commercial divisions:

- BBC Studios is the former in-house television production; Entertainment, Music & Events, Factual and Scripted (drama and comedy). Following a merger with BBC Worldwide in April 2018, it also operates international channels and sells programmes and merchandise in the UK and abroad to gain additional income that is returned to BBC programmes. It is kept separate from the corporation due to its commercial nature.
- BBC News is in charge of the production and distribution of its commercial global television channel. It works closely with the BBC News division, but is not governed by it, and shares the corporation's facilities and staff. It also works with BBC Studios, the channel's distributor.
- BBC Studioworks is also separate and officially owns and operates some of the BBC's studio facilities, such as the BBC Elstree Centre, leasing them out to productions from within and outside the corporation.

=== MI5 vetting policy ===
From as early as the 1930s until the 1990s, MI5, the British domestic intelligence service, engaged in the vetting of applicants for BBC jobs, a policy designed to keep out persons deemed subversive. In 1933, BBC executive Colonel Alan Dawnay began to meet the head of MI5, Sir Vernon Kell, to informally trade information; from 1935, a formal arrangement was made whereby job applicants would be secretly vetted by MI5 for their political views (without their knowledge). The BBC took up a policy of denying any suggestion by the press of such a relationship (the very existence of MI5 itself was not officially acknowledged until the Security Service Act 1989).

This relationship garnered wider public attention after an article by David Leigh and Paul Lashmar appeared in The Observer in August 1985, revealing that MI5 had been vetting appointments, running operations from Room 105 in Broadcasting House. At the time of the exposé, the operation was being run by Ronnie Stonham. A memo from 1984 revealed that blacklisted organisations included the far-left Communist Party of Great Britain, the Socialist Workers Party, the Workers Revolutionary Party and the Militant tendency, as well as the far-right National Front and the British National Party. An association with one of these groups could result in a denial of a job application.

In October 1985 the BBC announced that it would stop the vetting process, except for a few people in top roles, as well as those in charge of Wartime Broadcasting Service emergency broadcasting (in the event of a nuclear war) and staff of the BBC World Service. In 1990, following the Security Service Act 1989, vetting was further restricted to those responsible for wartime broadcasting and those with access to secret government information. Michael Hodder, who succeeded Stonham, had the MI5 vetting files sent to the BBC Archives in Reading, Berkshire.

== Finances ==
The BBC has the second-largest budget of any UK-based broadcaster with an operating expenditure of £4.722 billion in 2013/14 compared with £6.471 billion for Sky UK in 2013/14 and £1.843 billion for ITV in the calendar year 2013.

=== Revenue ===
The principal means of funding the BBC is through the television licence, costing £169.50 per year per household as of April 2024. Such a licence is required to legally receive broadcast television across the UK, the Channel Islands and the Isle of Man. No licence is required to own a television used for other means, or for sound only radio sets (though a separate licence for these was also required for non-TV households until 1971). The cost of a television licence is set by the government and enforced by the criminal law. A 50% discount is offered to people who are registered blind or severely visually impaired, and the licence is completely free for any household containing anyone aged 75 or over and receiving pension credit.

The BBC pursues its licence fee collection and enforcement under the trading name "TV Licensing". The revenue is collected privately by Capita, an outside agency, and is paid into the central government Consolidated Fund, a process defined in the Communications Act 2003. Funds are then allocated by the Department for Culture, Media and Sport (DCMS) and the Treasury and approved by Parliament via legislation. Additional revenues are paid by the Department for Work and Pensions to compensate for subsidised licences for eligible over-75-year-olds.

The licence fee is classified as a tax, and its evasion is a criminal offence. Since 1991, collection and enforcement of the licence fee has been the responsibility of the BBC in its role as TV Licensing Authority. The BBC carries out surveillance (mostly using subcontractors) on properties (under the auspices of the Regulation of Investigatory Powers Act 2000) and may conduct searches of a property using a search warrant. According to TV Licensing, 216,900 people in the UK were caught watching TV without a licence in 2018/19. Licence fee evasion makes up about one-tenth of all cases prosecuted in magistrates' courts, representing 0.3% of court time.

Income from commercial enterprises and from overseas sales of its catalogue of programmes has substantially increased over recent years, with BBC Worldwide contributing some £243 million to the BBC's core public service business.

According to the BBC's 2018/19 Annual Report, its total income was £4.889 billion a decrease from £5.062 billion in 2017/18 – partly owing to a 3.7% phased reduction in government funding for free over-75s TV licences, which can be broken down as follows:

- £3.690 billion in licence fees collected from householders;
- £1.199 billion from the BBC's commercial businesses and government grants some of which will cease in 2020

But the licence fee has attracted criticism. It has been argued that in an age of multi-stream, multi-channel availability, an obligation to pay a licence fee is no longer appropriate. The BBC's use of private sector company Capita to send letters to premises not paying the licence fee has been criticised, especially as there have been cases where such letters have been sent to premises which are up to date with their payments, or do not require a TV licence.

The BBC uses advertising campaigns to inform customers of the requirement to pay the licence fee. Past campaigns have been criticised by Conservative MP Boris Johnson and former MP Ann Widdecombe for having a threatening nature and language used to scare evaders into paying. Audio clips and television broadcasts are used to inform listeners of the BBC's comprehensive database. There are a number of pressure groups campaigning on the issue of the licence fee.

In 2023, about half a million UK households cancelled their TV licence, driven by shifting viewing habits and financial pressures. As a result, the BBC saw a decline in revenue, with the number of households paying the licence fee dropping to 23.9 million.

The majority of the BBC's commercial output comes from its commercial arm BBC Worldwide which sell programmes abroad and exploit key brands for merchandise. Of their 2012/13 sales, 27% were centred on the five key "superbrands" of Doctor Who, Top Gear, Strictly Come Dancing (known as Dancing with the Stars internationally), the BBC's archive of natural history programming (collected under the umbrella of BBC Earth) and the (now sold) travel guide brand Lonely Planet.

In April 2026, the BBC announced that they would be cutting between 1,800 and 2,000 jobs, citing a need to save £500 million over the coming two years.

=== Assets ===
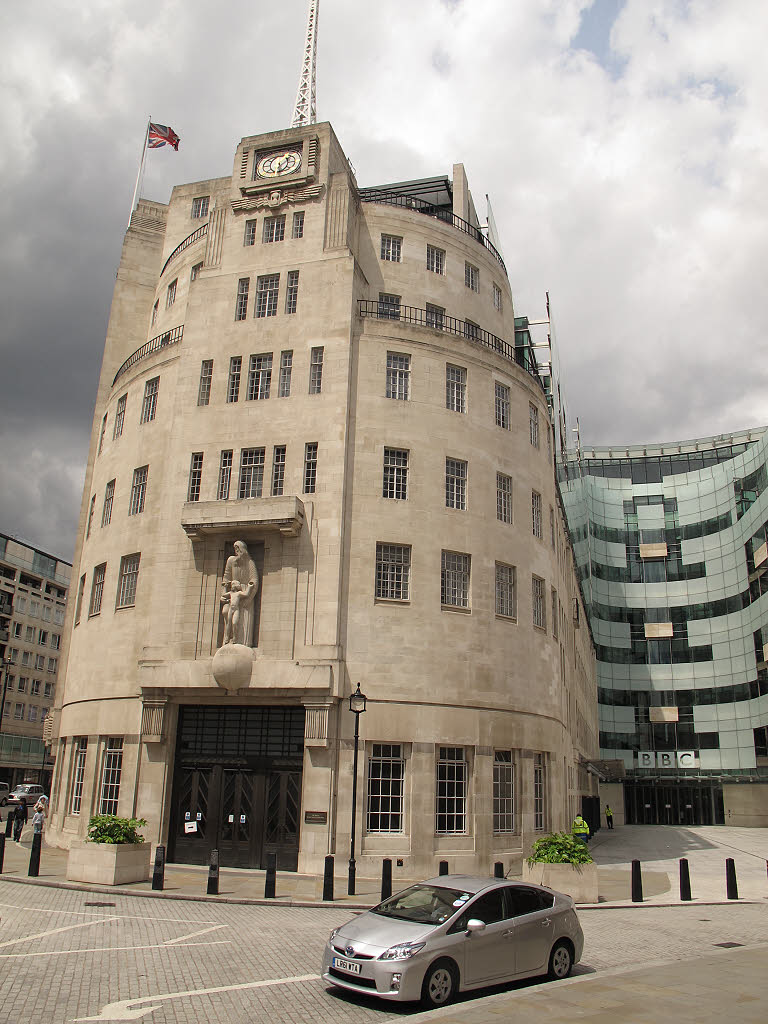
The headquarters of the BBC at Broadcasting House in Portland Place, central London. This section of the building is called Old Broadcasting House.

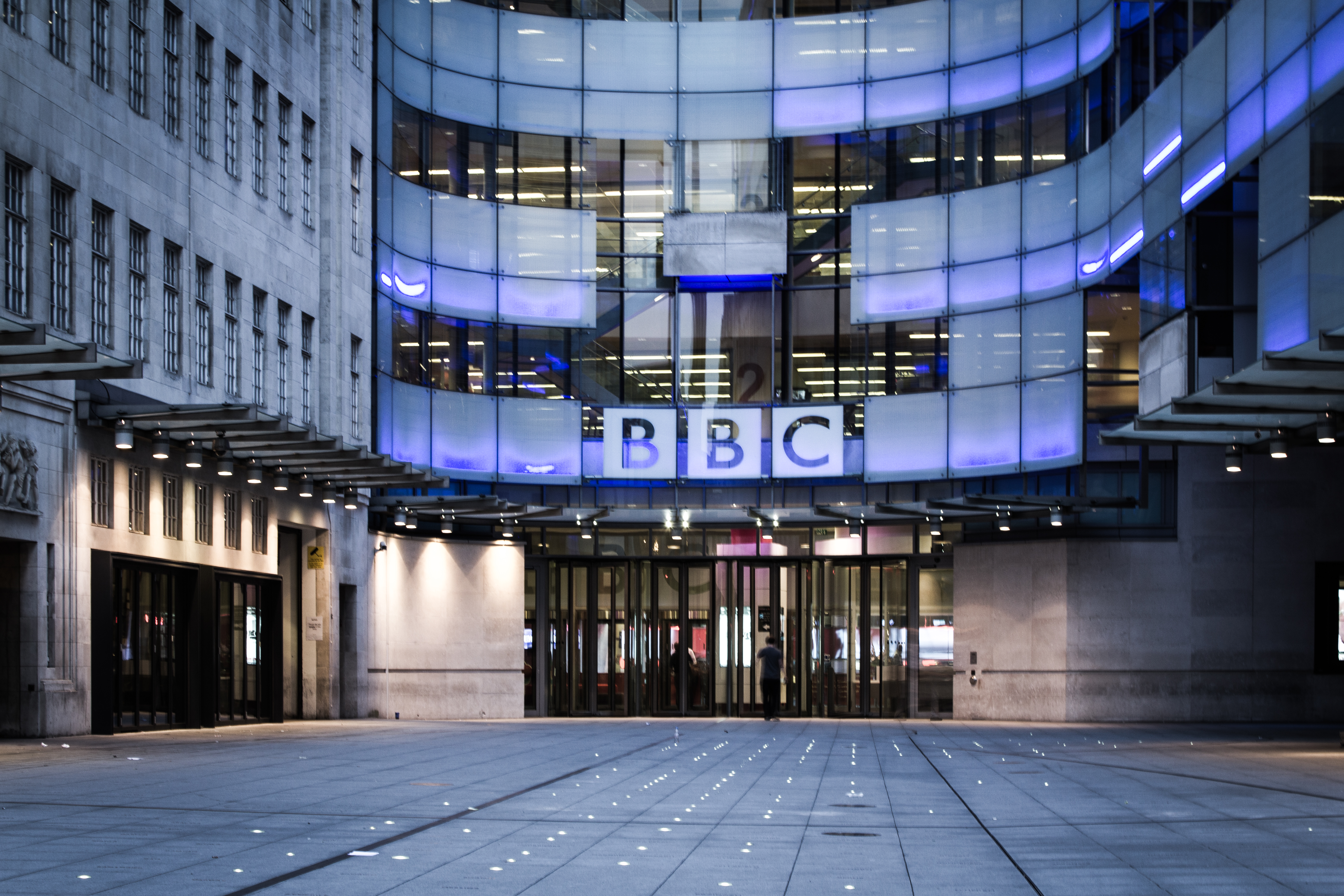
The main entrance of the extension to the building (New Broadcasting House).

Broadcasting House in Portland Place, central London, is the official headquarters of the BBC. It is home to the BBC's national and international radio networks (BBC Radio 1, BBC Radio 1Xtra, BBC Asian Network, BBC Radio 2, BBC Radio 3, BBC Radio 4, BBC Radio 4 Extra, BBC Radio 6 Music and the BBC World Service), with the exception of BBC Radio 5 Live and BBC Radio 5 Sports Extra which have broadcast from MediaCityUK in Salford since 2011. It is also the home of BBC News, which relocated to the building from BBC Television Centre in 2013. On the front of the building are statues of Prospero and Ariel, characters from William Shakespeare's play The Tempest, sculpted by Eric Gill. Renovation of Broadcasting House began in 2002, and was completed in 2012.

Until it closed at the end of March 2013, BBC Television was based at Television Centre, a purpose-built television facility opened in 1960 located in White City, four miles (6 km) west of central London. This facility was host to a number of famous guests and programmes through the years, and its name and image is familiar with many British citizens. Nearby, the White City Place complex contains numerous programme offices, housed in Centre House, the Media Centre and Broadcast Centre. It is in this area around Shepherd's Bush that the majority of BBC employees worked.

As part of a major reorganisation of BBC property, the entire BBC News operation relocated from the News Centre at BBC Television Centre to the refurbished Broadcasting House to create what is being described as "one of the world's largest live broadcast centres". The BBC News Channel and BBC News International relocated to the premises in early 2013. Broadcasting House is now also home to most of the BBC's national radio stations, and the BBC World Service. The major part of this plan involved the demolition of the two post-war extensions to the building and construction of an extension designed by Sir Richard MacCormac of MJP Architects. This move concentrated the BBC's London operations, allowing them to sell Television Centre.

In addition to the scheme above, the BBC is in the process of making and producing more programmes outside London, involving production centres such as Belfast, Cardiff, Glasgow, Newcastle and, most notably, in Greater Manchester as part of the "BBC North Project" scheme where several major departments, including BBC North West, BBC Manchester, BBC Sport, BBC Children's, CBeebies, Radio 5 Live, BBC Radio 5 Sports Extra, BBC Breakfast, BBC Learning and the BBC Philharmonic have all moved from their previous locations in either London or New Broadcasting House, Manchester to the new 200-acre (80ha) MediaCityUK production facilities in Salford, that form part of the large BBC North Group division and will therefore become the biggest staffing operation outside London.

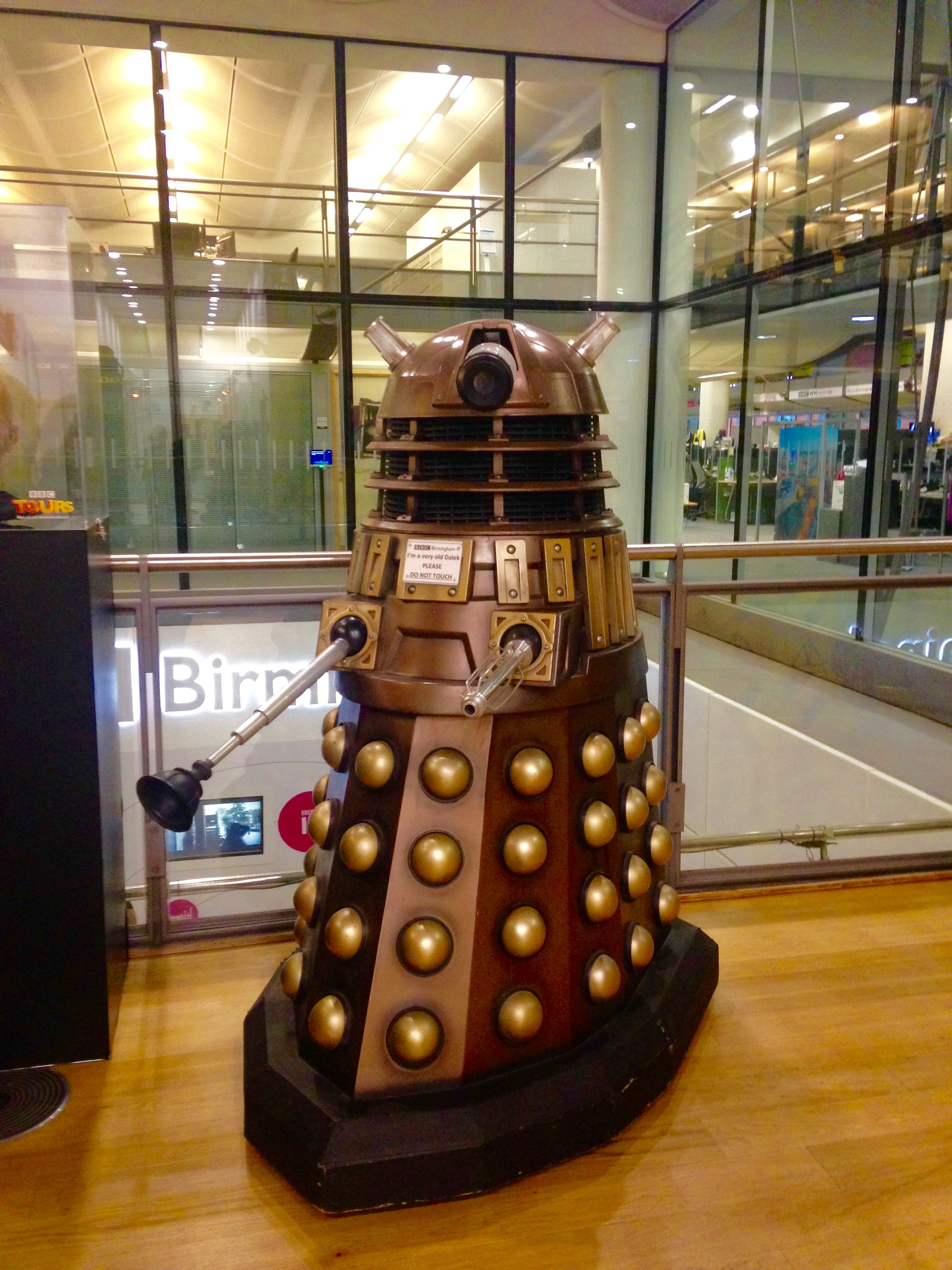
A Dalek prop used in Doctor Who at BBC Birmingham

As well as the two main sites in London (Broadcasting House and White City), there are seven other important BBC production centres in the UK, mainly specialising in different productions. Cardiff is home to BBC Cymru Wales, which specialises in drama production. Open since 2012, and containing 7 new studios, Roath Lock is notable as the home of productions such as Doctor Who and Casualty. Broadcasting House Belfast, home to BBC Northern Ireland, specialises in original drama and comedy, and has taken part in many co-productions with independent companies and notably with RTÉ in the Republic of Ireland. BBC Scotland, based in Pacific Quay, Glasgow is a large producer of programmes for the network, including several quiz shows. In England, the larger regions also produce some programming.

Previously the largest hub of BBC programming from the regions had been BBC North West. At present they produce all religious and ethical programmes on the BBC, as well as other programmes such as A Question of Sport. However, this is to be merged and expanded under the BBC North project, which involved the region moving from New Broadcasting House, Manchester, to MediaCityUK. BBC Midlands, based at Mailbox Birmingham, also produces drama and contains the headquarters for the English regions and the BBC's daytime output. Other production centres include Broadcasting House Bristol, home of BBC West and famously the BBC Studios Natural History Unit and to a lesser extent, Quarry Hill in Leeds, home of BBC Yorkshire. There are also many smaller local and regional studios throughout the UK, operating the BBC regional television services and the BBC Local Radio stations.

The BBC also operates several news gathering centres in various locations around the world, which provide news coverage of that region to the national and international news operations.

=== Information technology service management ===
In 2004 the BBC contracted out its former BBC Technology division to the German engineering and electronics company Siemens IT Solutions and Services (SIS), outsourcing its IT, telephony and broadcast technology systems. When Atos Origin acquired the SIS division from Siemens in December 2010 for €850 million (£720m), the BBC support contract also passed to Atos, and in July 2011, the BBC announced to staff that its technology support would become an Atos service. Siemens staff working on the BBC contract were transferred to Atos; the BBC's Information Technology systems are now managed by Atos. In 2011, the BBC's chief financial officer Zarin Patel stated to the House of Commons Public Accounts Committee that, following criticism of the BBC's management of major IT projects with Siemens (such as the Digital Media Initiative), the BBC partnership with Atos would be instrumental in achieving cost savings of about £64 million as part of the BBC's "Delivering Quality First" programme. In 2012, the BBC's then-chief technology officer John Linwood, expressed confidence in service improvements to the BBC's technology provision brought about by Atos. He also stated that supplier accountability had been strengthened following some high-profile technology failures which had taken place during the partnership with Siemens.

== Services ==
=== Television ===
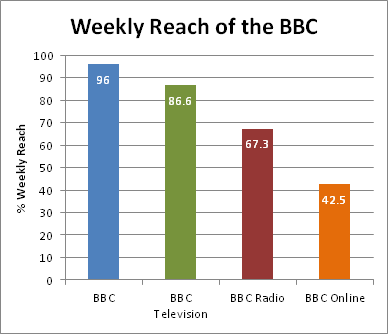
Weekly reach of the BBC's domestic services from 2011 to 2012. Reach is the number of people who use the service at any point for more than 15 minutes in a week.

The BBC operates several television channels nationally and internationally. BBC One and BBC Two are the flagship television channels. Others include the youth channel BBC Three, (Note: BBC Three ceased broadcasting as a linear television channel in February 2016 but returned to television in February 2022.) cultural and documentary channel BBC Four, the British and international variations of the BBC News channel, parliamentary channel BBC Parliament, and two children's channels, CBBC and CBeebies. Digital television is now entrenched in the UK, with analogue transmission completely phased out as of December 2012.

BBC One is a regionalised TV service which provides opt-outs throughout the day for local news and other local programming. These variations are more pronounced in the BBC "Nations", i.e. Northern Ireland, Scotland and Wales, where the presentation is mostly carried out locally on BBC One and Two, and where programme schedules can vary considerably from that of the network. BBC Two variations exist in the Nations; however, English regions today rarely have the option to opt out as regional programming now exists only on BBC One. In 2019, the Scottish variation of BBC Two ceased operation and was replaced with the networked version in favour of a new BBC Scotland channel. BBC Two was the first channel to be transmitted on 625 lines, in 1964. It then carried a small-scale regular colour service from 1967. BBC One followed in November 1969.

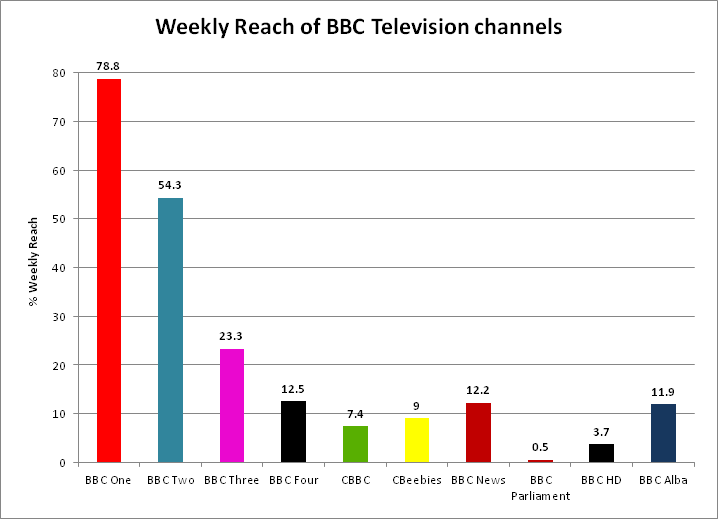
Weekly reach of the BBC's domestic television channels 2011–12

A new Scottish Gaelic television channel, BBC Alba, was launched in September 2008. It is also the first multi-genre channel to come entirely from Scotland with almost all of its programmes made in Scotland. The service was initially available only via satellite but since June 2011 has been available to viewers in Scotland on Freeview and cable television.

The BBC currently operates HD simulcasts of all its nationwide channels with the exception of BBC Parliament. Until 26 March 2013, a separate channel called BBC HD was available, in place of BBC Two HD. It launched on 15 May 2006, following a 12-month trial of the broadcasts. It became a proper channel in 2007, and screened HD programmes as simulcasts of the main network, or as repeats. The corporation has been producing programmes in the format for many years, and stated that it hoped to produce 100% of new programmes in HDTV by 2010. On 3 November 2010, a high-definition simulcast of BBC One was launched, entitled BBC One HD, and BBC Two HD launched on 26 March 2013, replacing BBC HD. Scotland's new television channel, BBC Scotland, launched in February 2019.

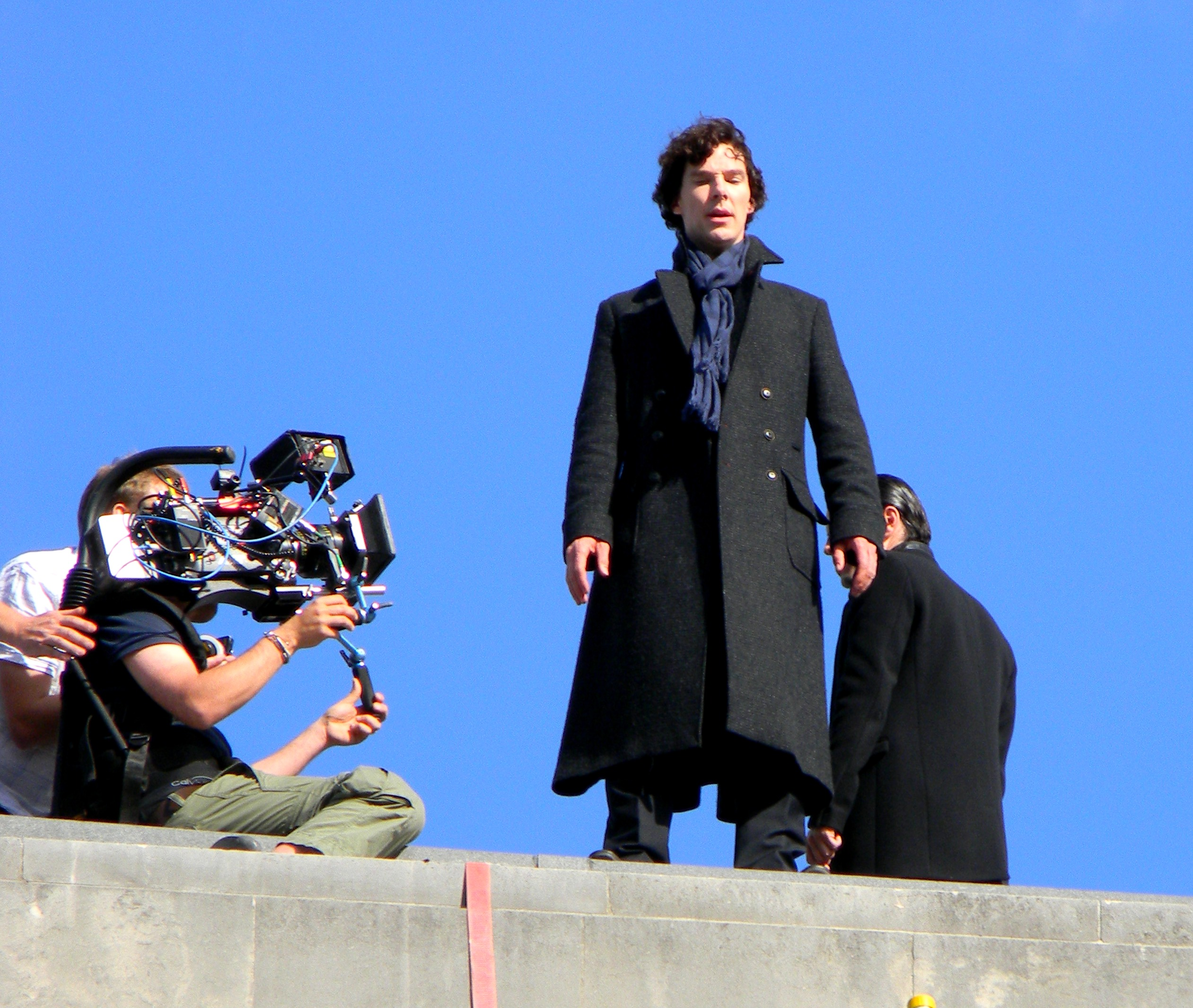
Filming an episode of BBC One's Sherlock (with Benedict Cumberbatch as Sherlock Holmes pictured) in July 2011

In the Republic of Ireland, Belgium, the Netherlands and Switzerland, the BBC channels are available in a number of ways. In these countries digital and cable operators carry a range of BBC channels. These include BBC One, BBC Two, BBC Four and BBC News, although viewers in the Republic of Ireland may receive BBC services via overspill from transmitters in Northern Ireland or Wales, or via "deflectors"—transmitters in the Republic which rebroadcast broadcasts from the UK, received off-air, or from digital satellite.

Since 1975 the BBC has also provided its TV programmes to the British Forces Broadcasting Service (BFBS), allowing members of UK military serving abroad to watch them on four dedicated TV channels. From 27 March 2013, BFBS will carry versions of BBC One and BBC Two, which will include children's programming from CBBC, as well as carrying programming from BBC Three on a new channel called BFBS Extra.

Since 2008 all BBC channels are available to watch online through the BBC iPlayer service. This online streaming ability came about following experiments with live streaming, involving streaming certain channels in the UK. In February 2014, Director-General Tony Hall announced that the corporation needed to save £100 million. In March 2014, the BBC confirmed plans for BBC Three to become an internet-only channel.

=== BBC Genome Project ===
In December 2012 the BBC completed a digitisation exercise, scanning the listings of all BBC programmes from an entire run of about 4,500 copies of the Radio Times magazine from the first, 1923, issue to 2009 (later listings already being held electronically), the "BBC Genome project", with a view to creating an online database of its programme output. An earlier ten months of listings are to be obtained from other sources. They identified about five million programmes, involving 8.5 million actors, presenters, writers and technical staff. The Genome project was opened to public access on 15 October 2014, with corrections to OCR errors and changes to advertised schedules being crowdsourced.

=== Radio ===
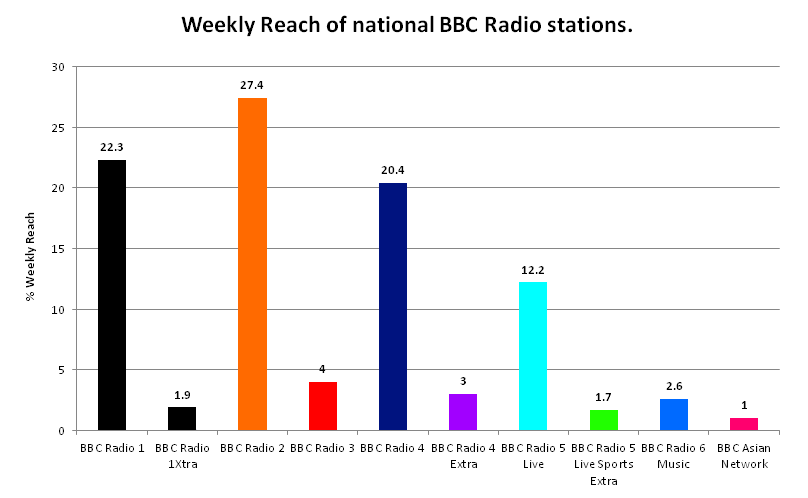
Weekly reach of the BBC's national radio stations, on both analogue and digital (2012)

The BBC has ten radio stations serving the whole of the UK, a further seven stations in the "national regions" (Wales, Scotland, and Northern Ireland), and 39 other local stations serving defined areas of England. Of the ten national stations, five are major stations and are available on FM or AM as well as on DAB and online. These are BBC Radio 1, offering new contemporary music and popular styles and being notable for its chart show; BBC Radio 2, playing adult contemporary, country and soul music amongst many other genres; BBC Radio 3, presenting classical and jazz music together with some spoken-word programming of a cultural nature in the evenings; BBC Radio 4, focusing on news, factual and other speech-based programming, including drama and comedy; and BBC Radio 5 Live, broadcasting 24-hour news, sport and talk programming.

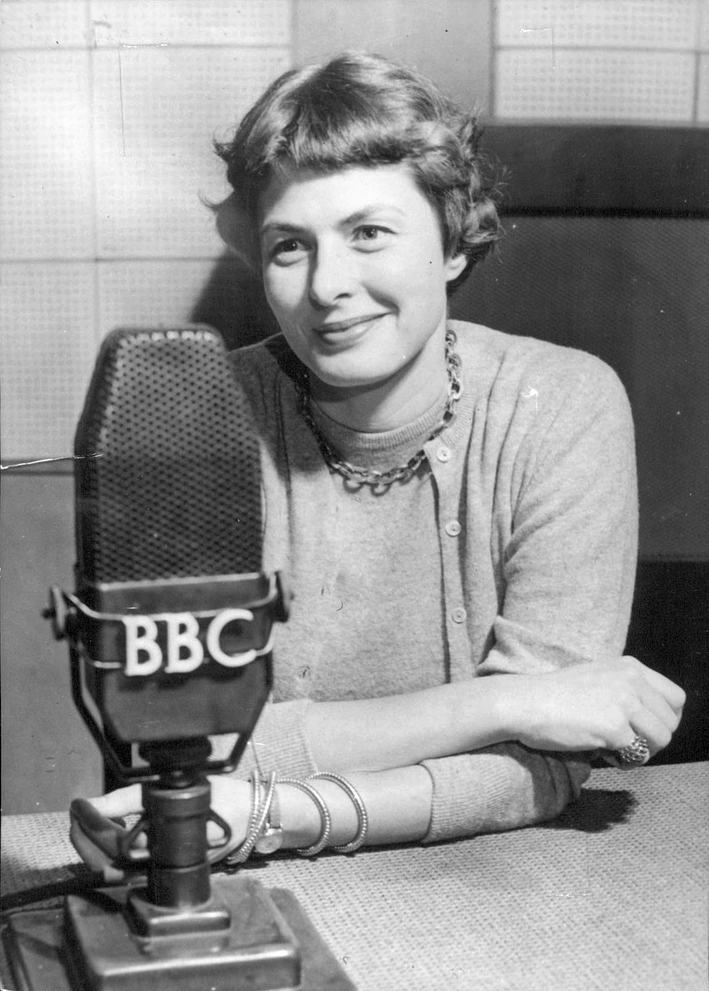
Swedish actress Ingrid Bergman being interviewed on BBC Radio in October 1954

In addition to these five stations, the BBC runs a further five stations that broadcast on DAB and online only. These stations supplement and expand on the big five stations, and were launched in 2002. BBC Radio 1Xtra sisters Radio 1, and broadcasts new Black music and urban tracks. BBC Radio 5 Sports Extra sisters 5 Live and offers extra sport analysis, including broadcasting sports that previously were not covered. BBC Radio 6 Music offers alternative music genres and is notable as a platform for new artists. BBC Radio 7, later renamed BBC Radio 4 Extra, provides archive drama, comedy and children's programming. The final station is the BBC Asian Network, providing music, talk and news to this section of the community. This station evolved out of Local radio stations serving certain areas, and as such this station is available on medium wave frequency in some areas of the Midlands.

As well as the national stations, the BBC also provides 40 BBC Local Radio stations in England and the Channel Islands, each named for and covering a particular city and its surrounding area (e.g. BBC Radio Bristol), county or region (e.g. BBC Three Counties Radio), or geographical area (e.g. BBC Radio Solent covering the central south coast). A further six stations broadcast in what the BBC terms "the national regions": Wales, Scotland, and Northern Ireland. These are BBC Radio Wales (in English), BBC Radio Cymru (in Welsh), BBC Radio Scotland (in English), BBC Radio nan Gàidheal (in Scottish Gaelic), BBC Radio Ulster, and BBC Radio Foyle, the latter being an opt-out station from Radio Ulster for the north-west of Northern Ireland.

The BBC's UK national channels are also broadcast in the Channel Islands and the Isle of Man (although these Crown Dependencies are outside the UK), and in the former there are two local stations – BBC Radio Guernsey and BBC Radio Jersey. There is no BBC local radio station, however, in the Isle of Man, partly because the island has long been served by the popular independent commercial station, Manx Radio, which predates the existence of BBC Local Radio. BBC services in the dependencies are financed from television licence fees which are set at the same level as those payable in the UK, although collected locally. This is the subject of some controversy in the Isle of Man since, as well as having no BBC Local Radio service, the island also lacks a local television news service analogous to that provided by BBC Channel Islands.

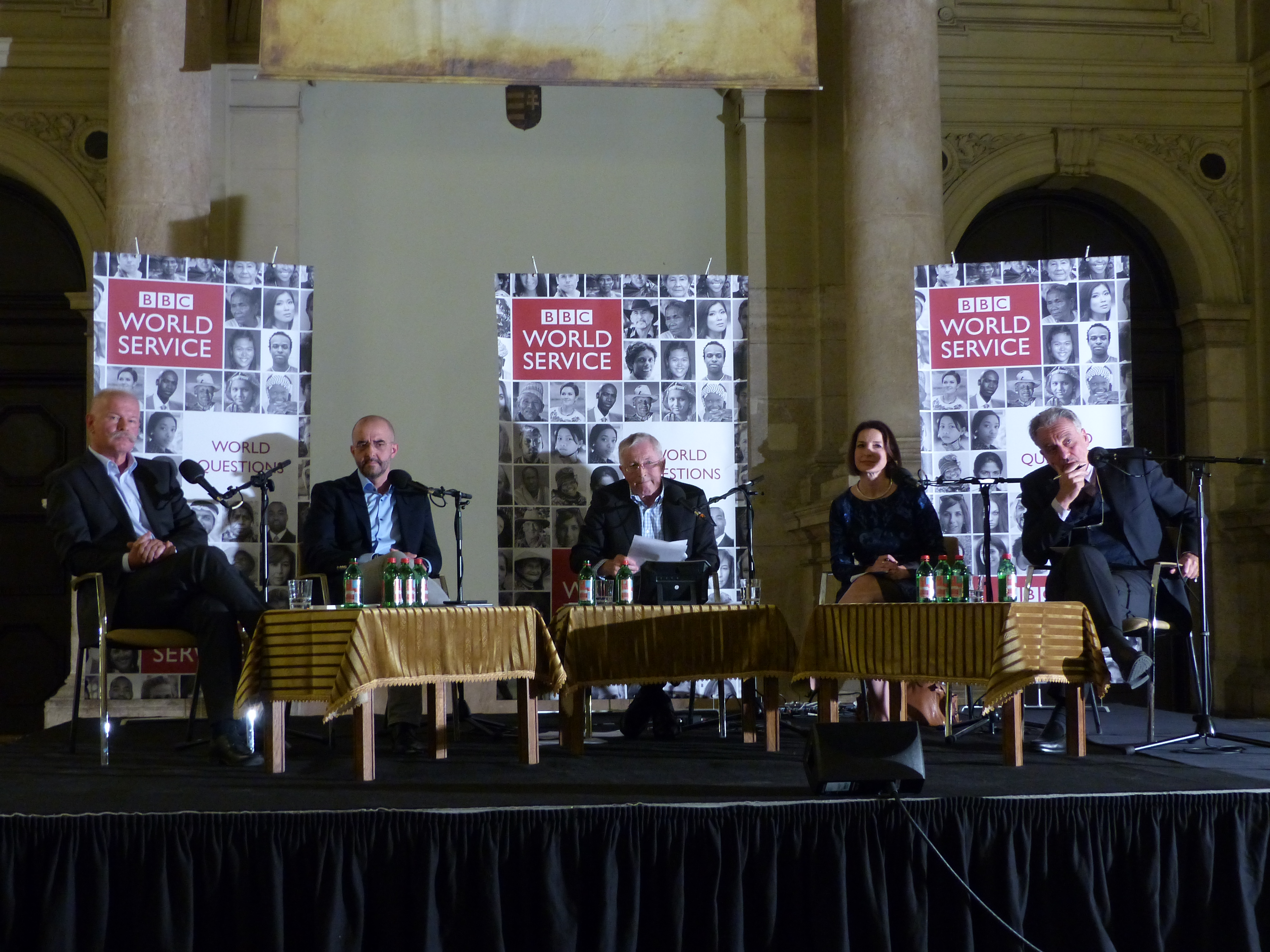
BBC World Service, with Jonathan Dimbleby (middle) broadcasting from Budapest, Hungary in 2016

For a worldwide audience the BBC World Service provides news, current affairs and information in more than 40 languages, including English, around the world, and is available in over 150 capital cities, making it the world's largest external broadcaster in terms of reception area, language selection and audience reach. It is broadcast worldwide on shortwave radio, DAB and online and has an estimated weekly audience of 192 million, and its websites have an audience of 38 million people per week. Since 2005, it is also available on DAB in the UK, a step not taken before, due to the way it is funded. Following the Government's spending review in 2011, the service was funded for the first time through the Licence fee. In recent years, some services of the World Service have been reduced: the Thai service ended in 2006, as did the Eastern European languages. Resources were diverted instead into the new BBC News Arabic.

Historically the BBC was the only legal radio broadcaster based in the UK mainland until 1967, when University Radio York, then under the name Radio York, was launched as the first, and now oldest, legal independent radio station in the country. However, the BBC did not enjoy a complete monopoly before this, as several Continental stations, such as Radio Luxembourg, had broadcast programmes in English to Britain since the 1930s and the Isle of Man-based Manx Radio began in 1964. Today, despite the advent of commercial broadcasting, BBC radio stations remain among the most listened-to in the country. Radio 2 has the largest audience share (up to 16.8% in 2011–12) and Radios 1 and 4 ranked second and third in terms of weekly reach.

BBC programming is also available to other services and in other countries. Since 1943, the BBC has provided radio programming to the British Forces Broadcasting Service, which broadcasts in countries where British troops are stationed. BBC Radio 1 is also carried in Canada on SiriusXM (online streaming only). The BBC is a patron of the Radio Academy, a registered UK charity that promotes excellence in broadcasting.

=== News ===
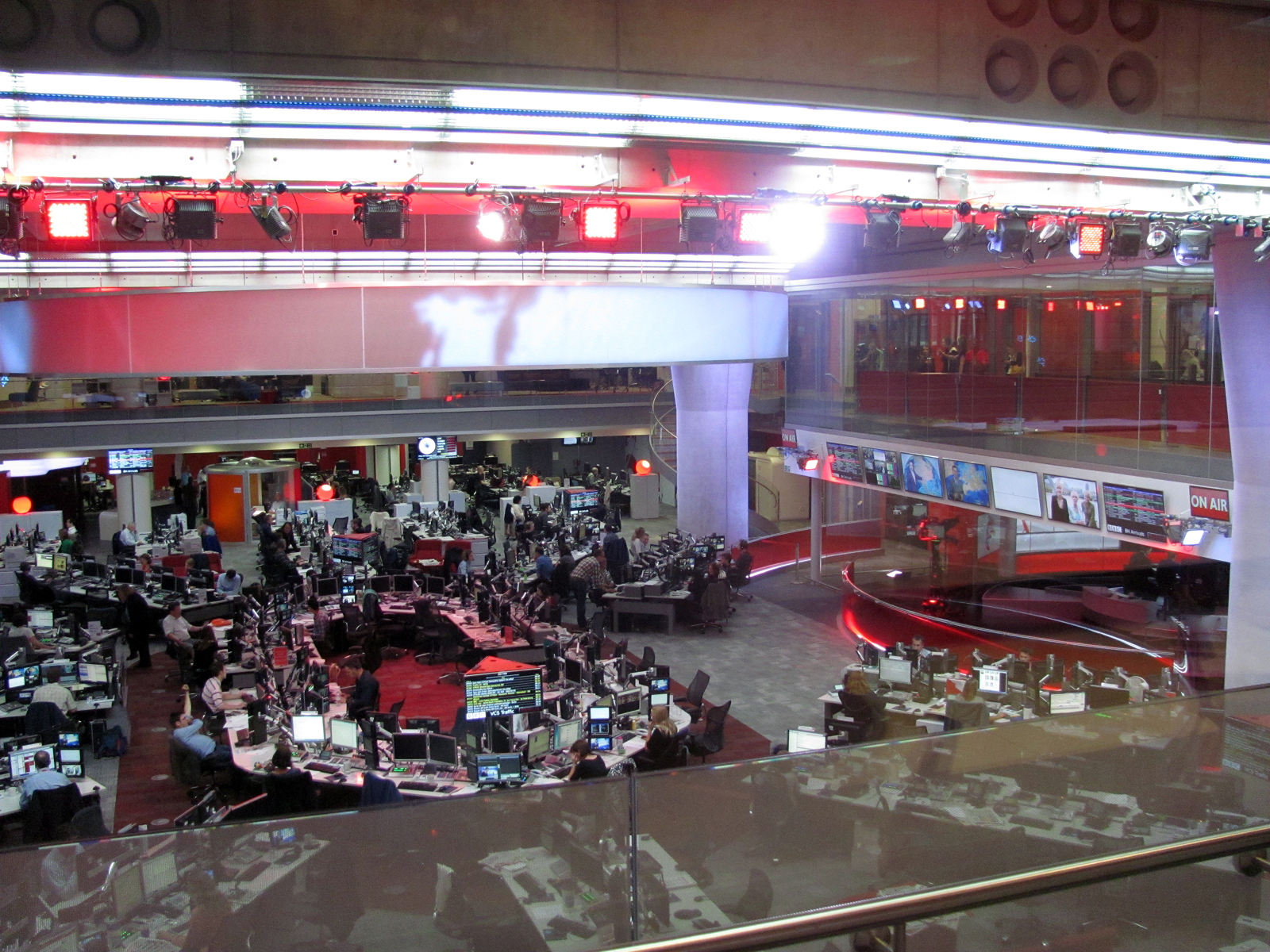
The new newsroom in Broadcasting House, central London, officially opened by the Queen in 2013

BBC News is the largest broadcast news gathering operation in the world, providing services to BBC domestic radio as well as television networks such as the BBC News, BBC Parliament and BBC News International. In addition to this, news stories are available on the BBC Red Button service and BBC News Online. In addition to this, the BBC has been developing new ways to access BBC News and as a result, has launched the service on BBC Mobile, making it accessible to mobile phones and PDAs, as well as developing alerts by email, on digital television, and on computers through a desktop alert.

Ratings figures suggest that during major incidents such as the 7 July 2005 London bombings or royal events, the UK audience overwhelmingly turns to the BBC's coverage as opposed to its commercial rivals. On 7 July 2005, the day there were a series of coordinated bomb blasts on London's public transport system, the BBC Online website recorded an all time bandwidth peak of 11 Gb/s at 12.00 on 7 July. BBC News received some 1 billion total hits on the day of the event (including all images, text, and HTML), serving some 5.5 terabytes of data. At peak times during the day, there were 40,000-page requests per second for the BBC News website. The previous day's announcement of the 2012 Summer Olympics being awarded to London caused a peak of about 5 Gbit/s. The previous all-time high at BBC Online was caused by the announcement of the Michael Jackson verdict, which used 7.2 Gbit/s.

=== Internet ===
The BBC's online presence includes a comprehensive news website and archive. The BBC's first official online service was the BBC Networking Club, which was launched on 11 May 1994. The service was subsequently relaunched as BBC Online in 1997, before being renamed BBCi, then bbc.co.uk, before it was rebranded back as BBC Online. The website is funded by the Licence fee, but uses GeoIP technology, allowing advertisements to be carried on the site when viewed outside the UK. The BBC claims the site to be "Europe's most popular content-based site" and states that 13.2 million people in the UK visit the site's more than two million pages each day.

The centre of the website is the Homepage, which features a modular layout. Users can choose which modules, and which information, is displayed on their homepage, allowing the user to customise it. This system was first launched in December 2007, becoming permanent in February 2008, and has undergone a few aesthetical changes since then. The home page then has links to other micro-sites, such as BBC News Online, Sport, Weather, TV, and Radio. As part of the site, every programme on BBC Television or Radio is given its own page, with bigger programmes getting their own micro-site, and as a result it is often common for viewers and listeners to be told URLs for the programme website.

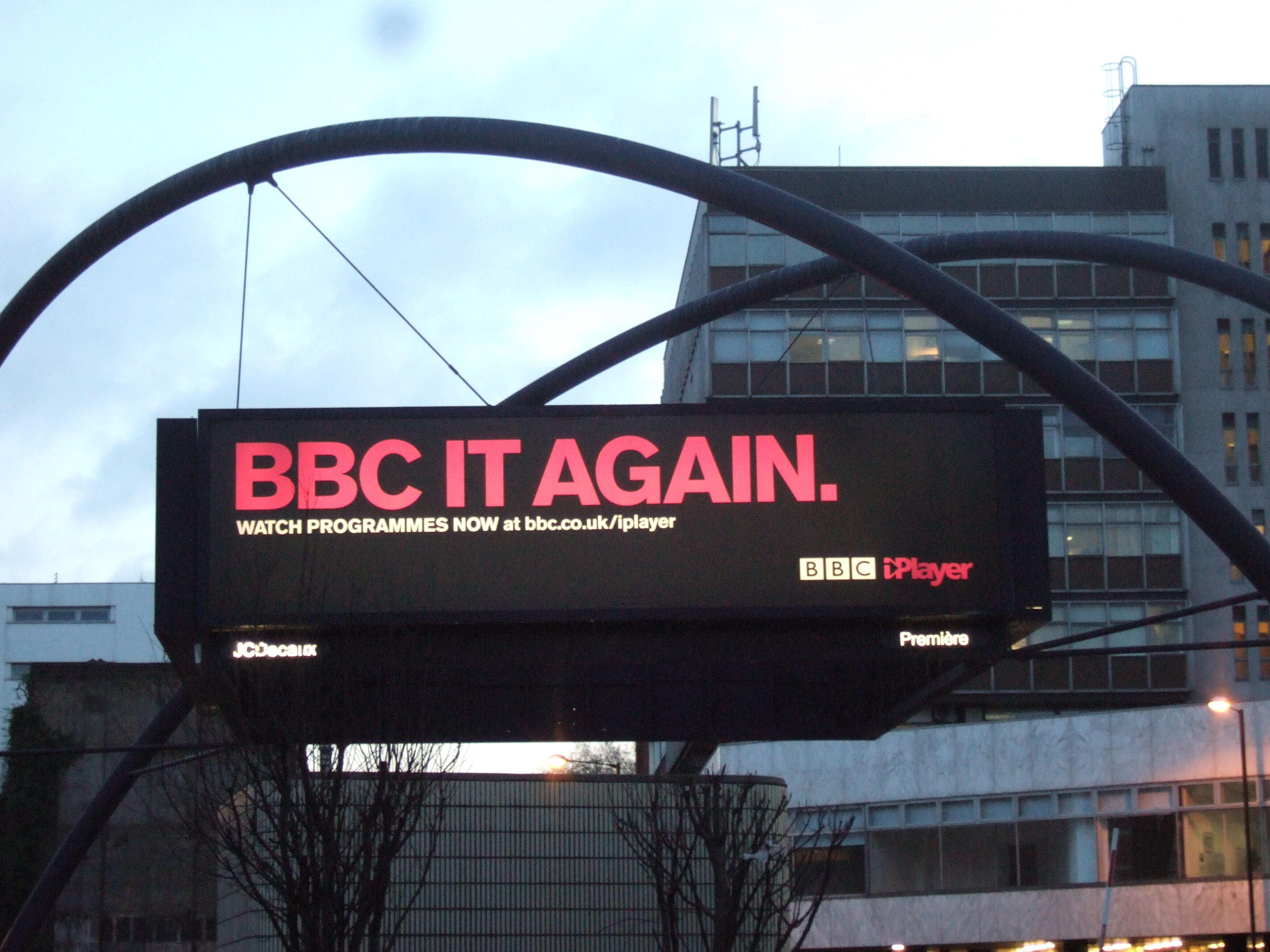
2008 advertisement for BBC iPlayer at Old Street, London

Another large part of the site also allows users to watch and listen to most Television and Radio output live and for seven days after broadcast using the BBC iPlayer platform, which launched on 27 July 2007, and initially used peer-to-peer and DRM technology to deliver both radio and TV content of the last seven days for offline use for up to 30 days, since then video is now streamed directly. Also, through participation in the Creative Archive Licence group, bbc.co.uk allowed legal downloads of selected archive material via the internet.

The BBC has often included learning as part of its online service, running services such as BBC Jam, Learning Zone Class Clips and also runs services such as BBC WebWise and First Click which are designed to teach people how to use the internet. BBC Jam was a free online service, delivered through broadband and narrowband connections, providing high-quality interactive resources designed to stimulate learning at home and at school. Initial content was made available in January 2006; however, BBC Jam was suspended on 20 March 2007 due to allegations made to the European Commission that it was damaging the interests of the commercial sector of the industry.

In recent years some major on-line companies and politicians have complained that BBC Online receives too much funding from the television licence, meaning that other websites are unable to compete with the vast amount of advertising-free on-line content available on BBC Online. Some have proposed that the amount of licence fee money spent on BBC Online should be reduced—either being replaced with funding from advertisements or subscriptions, or a reduction in the amount of content available on the site. In response to this the BBC carried out an investigation, and has now set in motion a plan to change the way it provides its online services. BBC Online will now attempt to fill in gaps in the market, and will guide users to other websites for currently existing market provision. (For example, instead of providing local events information and timetables, users will be guided to outside websites already providing that information.) Part of this plan included the BBC closing some of its websites, and rediverting money to redevelop other parts.

On 26 February 2010 The Times claimed that Mark Thompson, Director General of the BBC, proposed that the BBC's web output should be cut by 50%, with online staff numbers and budgets reduced by 25% in a bid to scale back BBC operations and allow commercial rivals more room. On 2 March 2010, the BBC reported that it would cut its website spending by 25% and close BBC 6 Music and Asian Network, as part of Mark Thompson's plans to make "a smaller, fitter BBC for the digital age".

=== Interactive television ===
BBC Red Button is the brand name for the BBC's interactive television services, which are available through Freeview (digital terrestrial), as well as Freesat, Sky UK (satellite), and Virgin Media (cable). Unlike Ceefax, the service's analogue counterpart, BBC Red Button is able to display full-colour graphics, photographs, and video, as well as programmes and can be accessed from any BBC channel. The service carries News, Weather and Sport 24 hours a day, but also provides extra features related to programmes specific at that time. Examples include viewers to play along at home to gameshows, to give, voice and vote on opinions to issues, as used alongside programmes such as Question Time. At some points in the year, when multiple sporting events occur, some coverage of less mainstream sports or games are frequently placed on the Red Button for viewers to watch. Frequently, other features are added unrelated to programmes being broadcast at that time, such as the broadcast of the Doctor Who animated episode Dreamland in November 2009.

=== Music ===
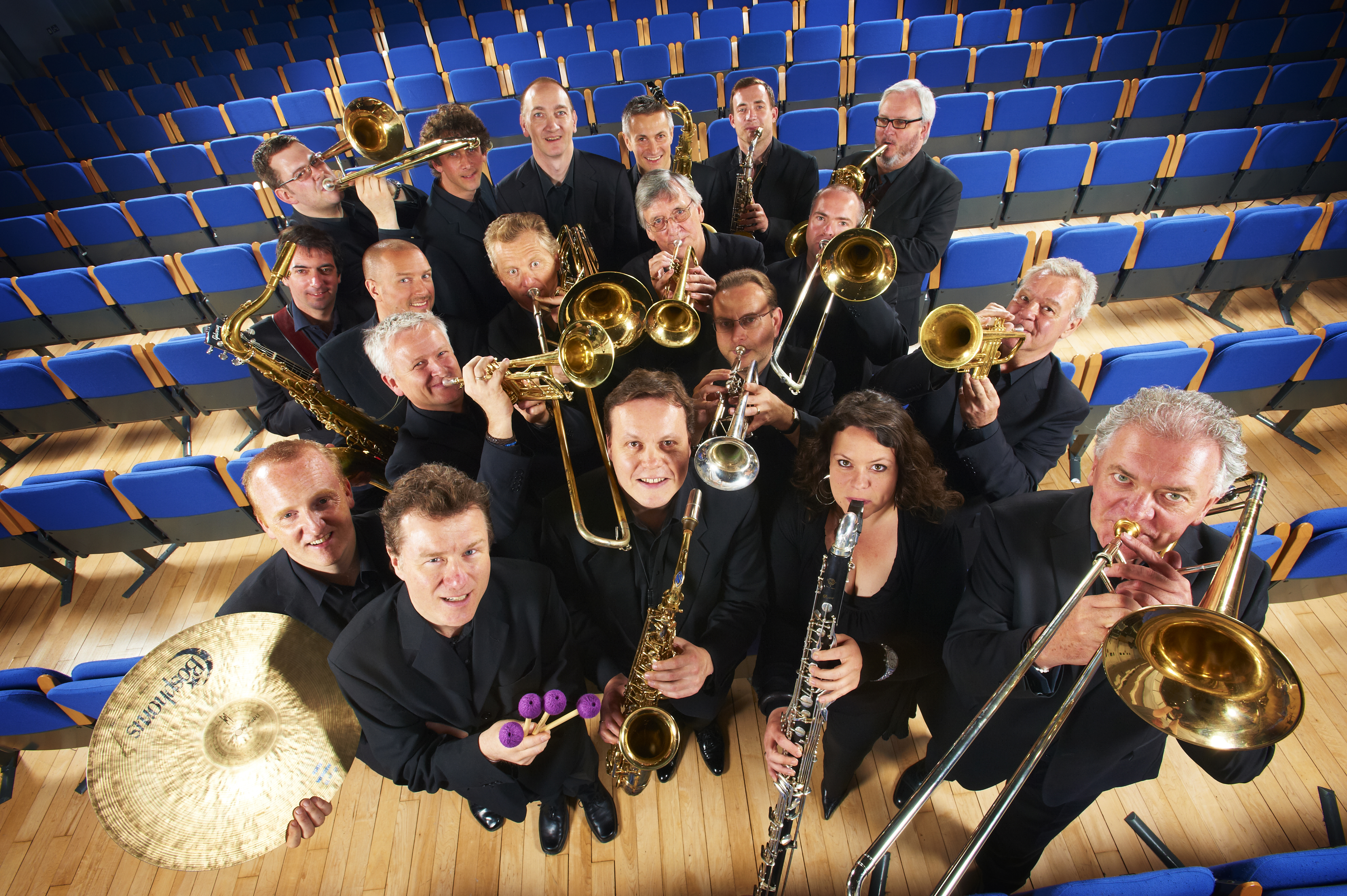
The BBC Big Band

The BBC employs 5 staff orchestras, a professional choir, and supports two amateur choruses, based in BBC venues across the UK; the BBC Symphony Orchestra, the BBC Singers and BBC Symphony Chorus based in London, the BBC Scottish Symphony Orchestra in Glasgow, the BBC Philharmonic in Salford, the BBC Concert Orchestra based in Watford, and the BBC National Orchestra of Wales in Cardiff. It also buys a selected number of broadcasts from the Ulster Orchestra in Belfast and the BBC Big Band.

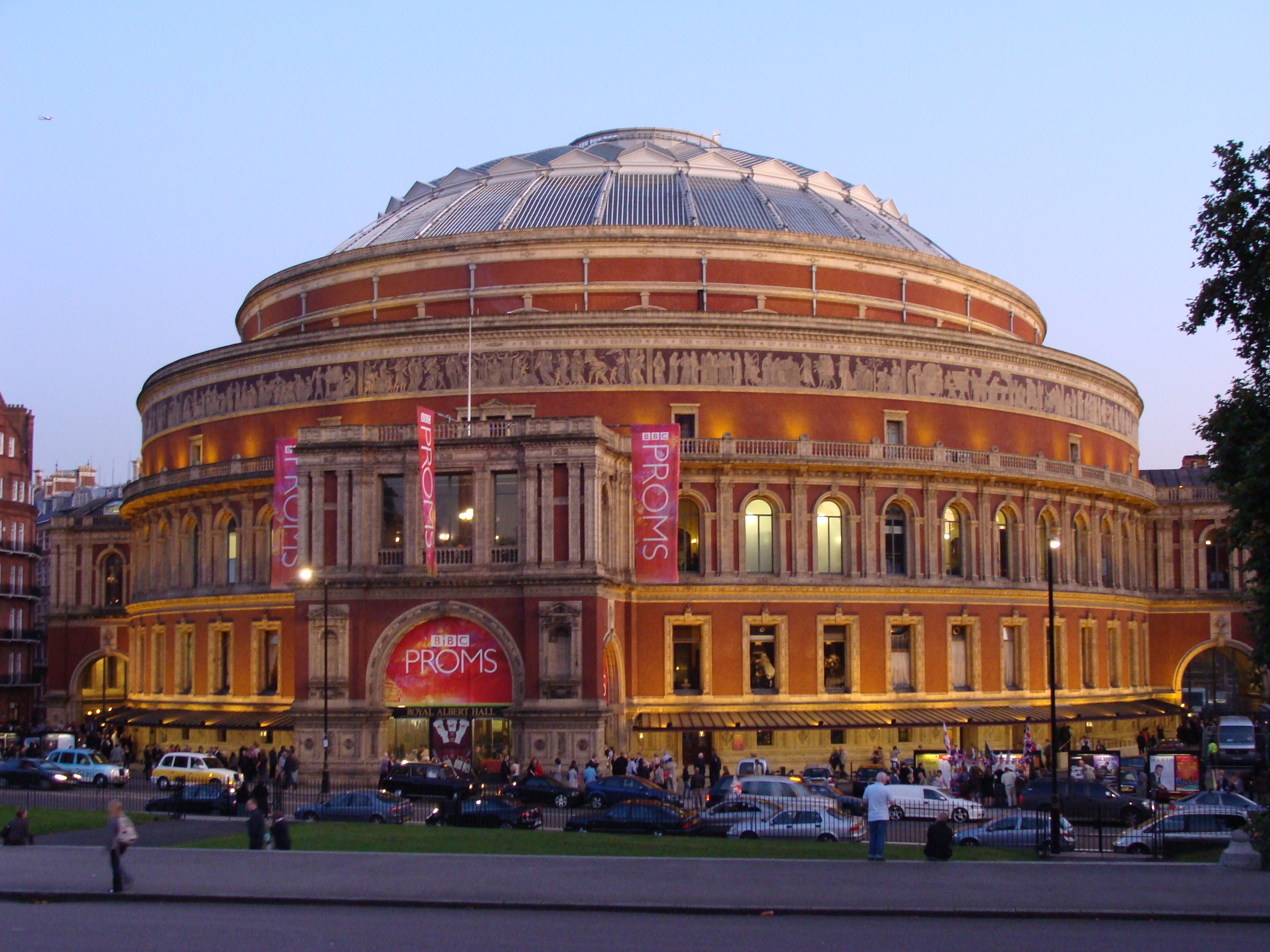
BBC Proms at the Royal Albert Hall

The BBC Proms have been produced by the BBC every year since 1927, stepping in to fund the popular eight-week summer classical music festival when music publishers Chappell and Co withdrew their support. In 1930, the newly formed BBC Symphony Orchestra gave all 49 Proms, and have performed at every Last Night of the Proms since then. The Proms have been held at the Royal Albert Hall since 1941, and the BBC's orchestras and choirs are the backbone of the festival, giving about 40% to 50% of all performances each season.

Many famous musicians of every genre have played at the BBC, such as The Beatles (Live at the BBC is one of their many albums). The BBC is also responsible for the broadcast of the Glastonbury Festival and the Reading and Leeds Festivals, and it has participated in the Eurovision Song Contest representing the United Kingdom for over 60 years. The BBC also operates the division of BBC Audiobooks sometimes found in association with Chivers Audiobooks.

=== Other ===
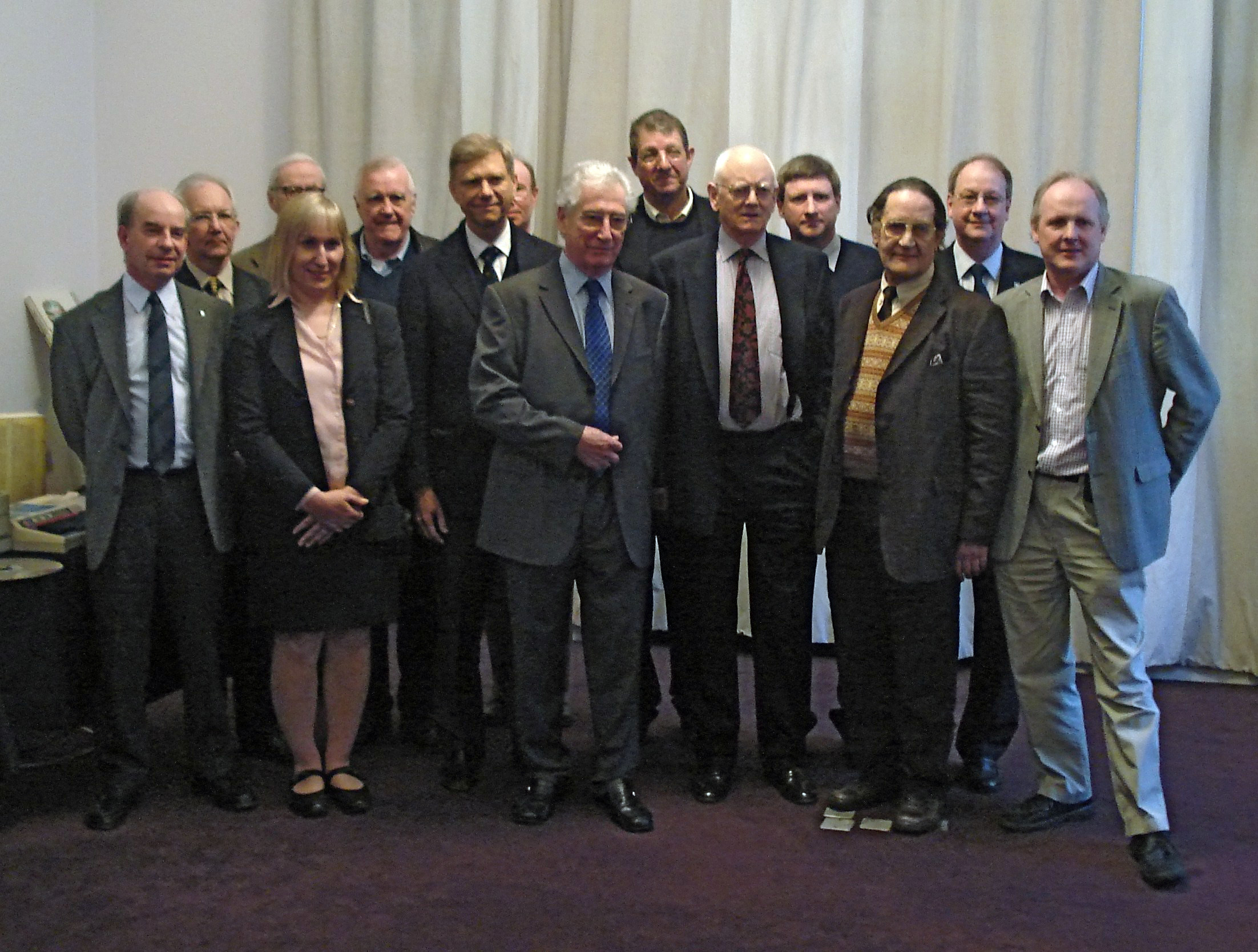
Some of the BBC Micro team in 2008. Developed by Acorn, the Micro computer dominated the educational computer market in the UK during the 1980s.

The BBC operates other ventures as well as its broadcasting arm. In addition to broadcasting output on television and radio, some programmes are also displayed on the BBC Big Screens in several central-city locations. The BBC and the Foreign, Commonwealth and Development Office also jointly run BBC Monitoring, which monitors radio, television, the press and the internet worldwide. The BBC also developed several computers throughout the 1980s, most notably the BBC Micro (created as part of the BBC Computer Literacy Project, which foreshadowed the coming microcomputer revolution and its effect on the economy, industry, and society of the United Kingdom), which ran alongside the corporation's educational aims and programming, starting with The Computer Programme broadcast in 1982. The National Museum of Computing at Bletchley Park uses BBC Micros as part of a scheme to educate school children about computer programming.

In 1951, in conjunction with Oxford University Press, the BBC published The BBC Hymn Book, intended to be used by radio listeners to follow hymns being broadcast. The book was published both with and without music, the music edition being entitled The BBC Hymn Book with Music. The book contained 542 popular hymns.

=== Ceefax ===
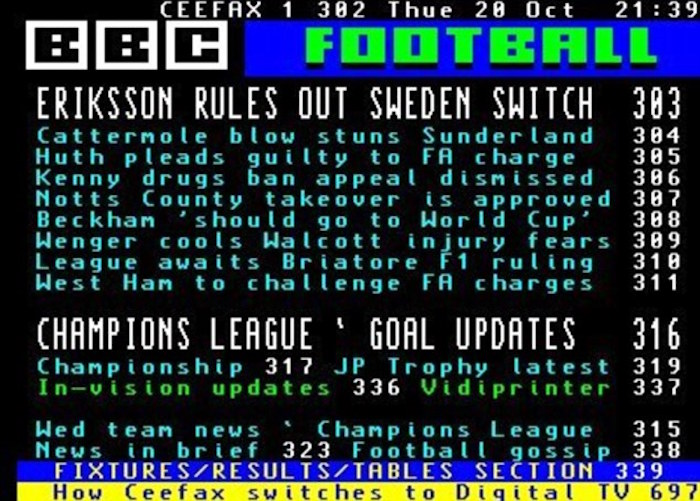
Ceefax page (showing football news) in 2009. A teletext service provided by the BBC from 1974 to 2012, it was a popular method to check score updates.

The BBC provided the world's first teletext service called Ceefax (near-homophonous with "See Facts") from 23 September 1974 until 23 October 2012 on the BBC1 analogue channel, then later on BBC2. It showed informational pages, such as news, sport, and the weather. From New Year's Eve, 1974, ITV's Oracle tried to compete with Ceefax. Oracle closed on New Year's Eve, 1992. During its lifetime, Ceefax attracted millions of viewers, right up until 2012, prior to the digital switchover in the United Kingdom. Since then, the BBC's Red Button Service has provided a digital information system that replaced Ceefax.

=== BritBox ===
In 2016 the BBC, in partnership with fellow UK broadcasters ITV and Channel 4 (the latter later withdrew from the project), set up 'project kangaroo' to develop an international online streaming service to rival services such as Netflix and Hulu. During the development stages 'Britflix' was touted as a potential name. However, the service eventually launched as BritBox in March 2017. The online platform shows a catalogue of classic BBC and ITV shows, as well as making a number of programmes available shortly after their UK broadcast. As of 2021, BritBox is available in the UK, the US, Canada, Australia, and, more recently, South Africa, with the potential availability for new markets in the future.

== Commercial activities ==
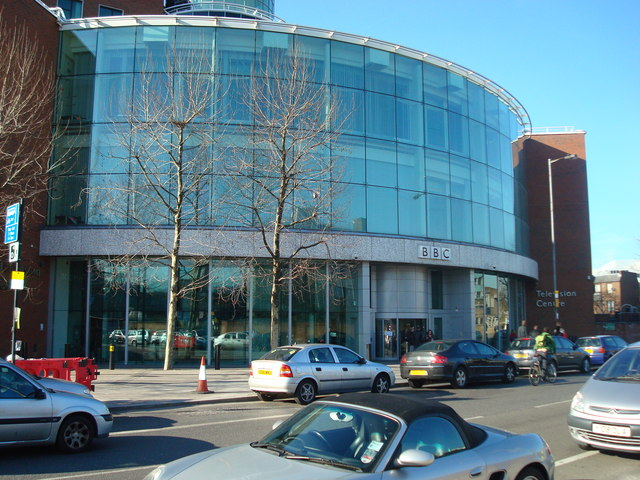
BBC Studios is headquartered at Television Centre (BBC Television's former headquarters) in west London.

BBC Studios is the wholly owned commercial subsidiary of the BBC, responsible for the commercial exploitation of BBC programmes and other properties, including a number of television stations throughout the world. It was formed in 2018 after the merger of the BBC's commercial production arm and the BBC's commercial international distribution arm, BBC Worldwide, with the latter formed in 1995 following the restructuring of its predecessor, BBC Enterprises. Prior to this, the selling of BBC television programmes was at first handled in 1958 with the establishment of a business manager post. This expanded until the establishment of the Television Promotions (renamed Television Enterprises) department in 1960 under a general manager.

The company owns and administers a number of commercial stations around the world operating in a number of territories and on a number of different platforms. These include BBC UKTV for the Australasia region, and formerly BBC America (now fully owned by AMC Networks). The company airs two channels aimed at children, an international CBeebies channel and BBC Kids, a joint venture with Knowledge Network Corporation. The company also runs BBC Earth, which distributes the BBC's natural history content to countries outside the UK, and BBC Lifestyle, broadcasting programmes based on themes of Food, Style and Wellbeing. In addition to this, BBC Studios ran an international version of the channel BBC HD.

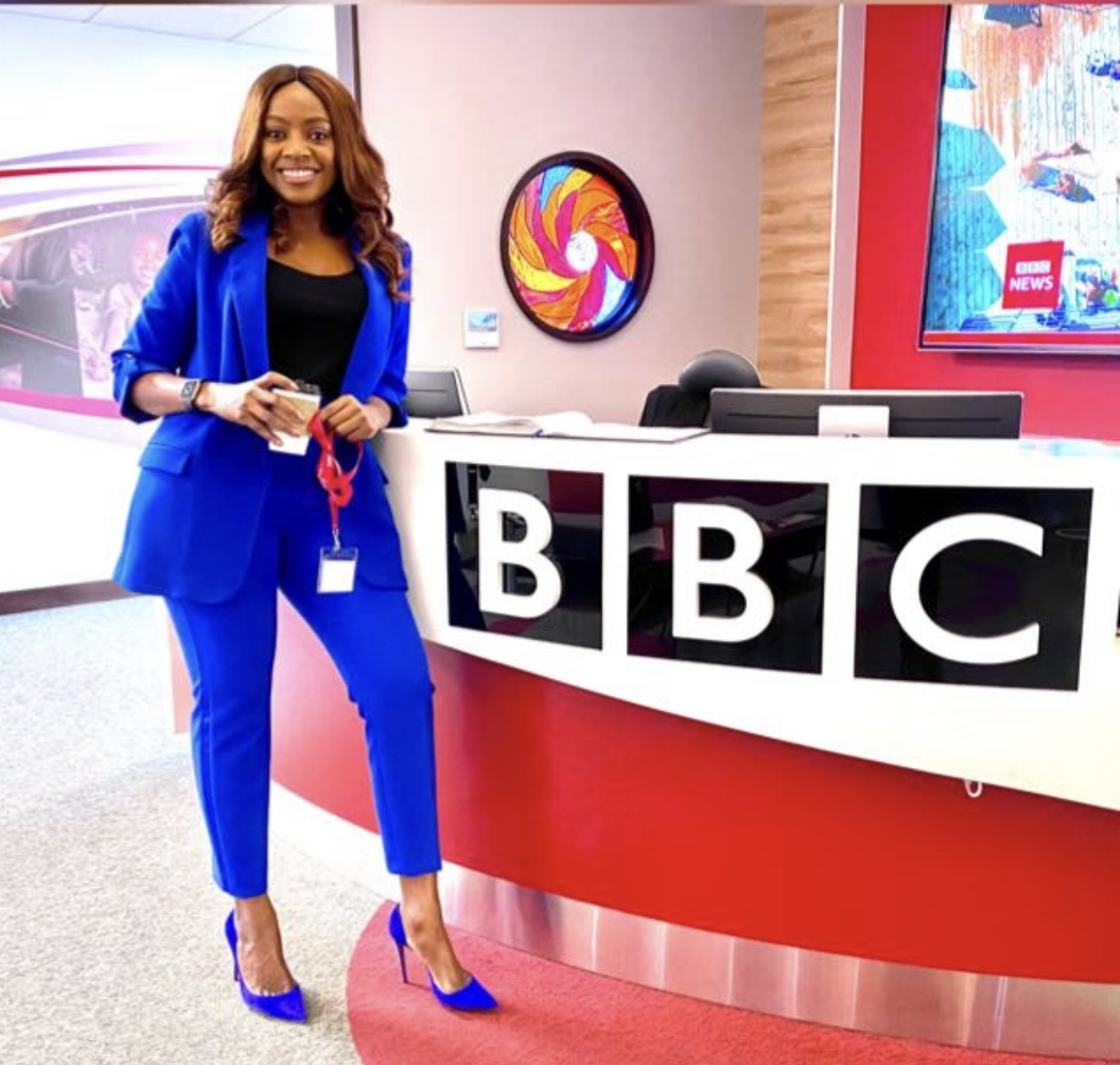
The BBC's East Africa bureau in Nairobi, Kenya. It is the broadcaster's biggest bureau outside the UK.

BBC Studios also distributes the 24-hour international news channel BBC News. The station is separate from BBC Studios to maintain the station's neutral point of view, but is distributed by BBC Studios. The channel itself is the oldest surviving entity of its kind, and has 50 foreign news bureaus and correspondents in nearly all countries in the world. As officially surveyed, it is available to more than 294 million households, significantly more than CNN's estimated 200 million. In addition to these international channels, BBC Studios also owns the UKTV network of seven channels. These channels contain BBC archive programming to be rebroadcast on their respective channels: Alibi, crime dramas; Dave (slogan: "The Home of Witty Banter"); Drama, drama, launched in 2013; Eden, nature; Gold, comedy; W, Entertainment; and Yesterday, history programming.

In addition to these channels, many BBC programmes are sold via BBC Studios to foreign television stations with comedy, documentaries, crime dramas (such as Luther and Peaky Blinders) and historical drama productions being the most popular. The BBC's most successful reality television show format, Strictly Come Dancing—under the title Dancing with the Stars—has been exported to 60 other countries. Shows commissioned and distributed by the BBC include the Wallace & Gromit animated comedy short films The Wrong Trousers and A Close Shave. BBC television news also appears nightly on many PBS stations in the US, as do reruns of BBC programmes such as EastEnders, and in New Zealand on TVNZ 1.

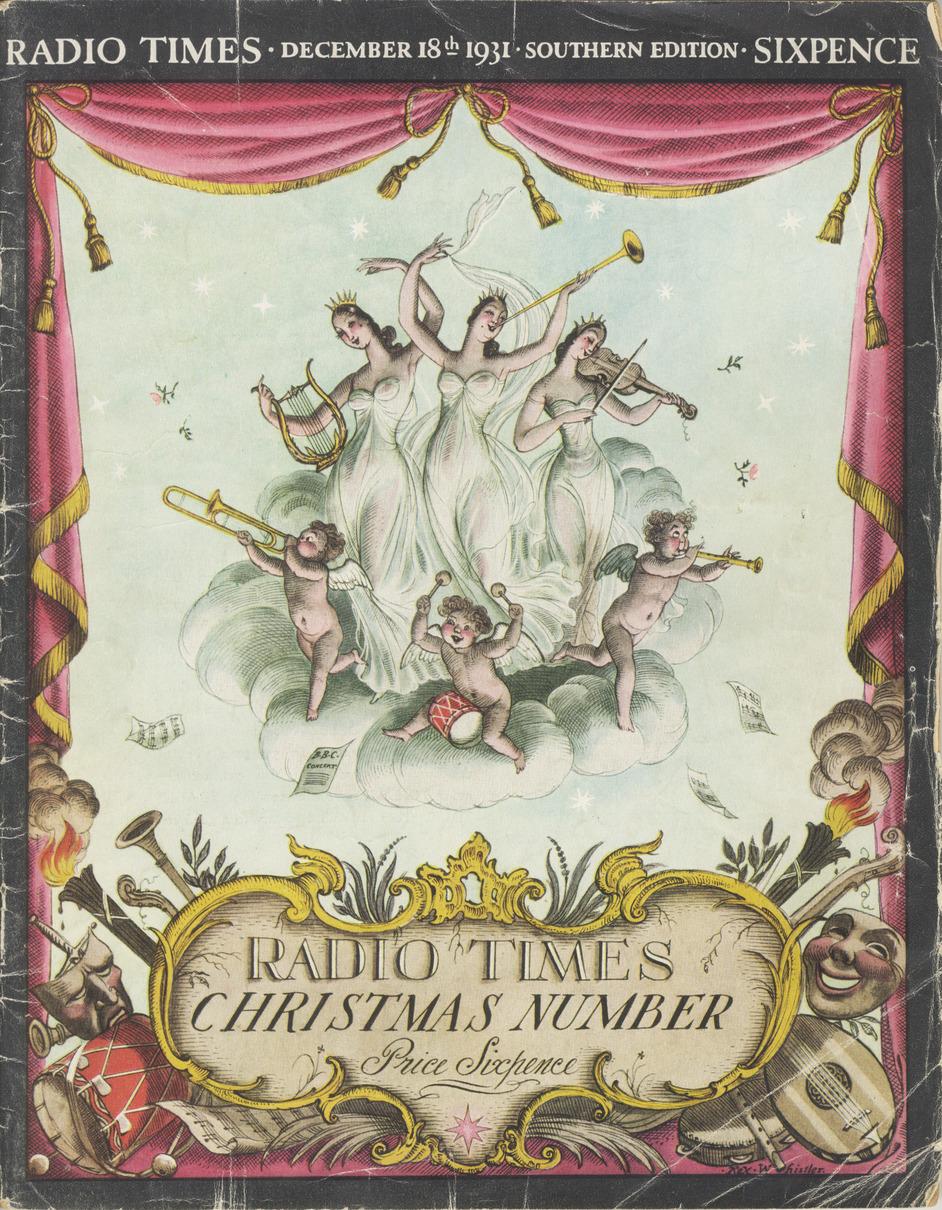
The 1931 Christmas issue of the Radio Times.

In addition to programming, BBC Studios produces material to accompany programmes. The company maintained the publishing arm of the BBC, BBC Magazines, which published the Radio Times; first published by the BBC on 28 September 1923, it is the world's first broadcast listings magazine. Radio Times covers all British television and radio programming schedules, and the 1988 Christmas edition sold 11,220,666 copies, which the Guinness World Records certified as the biggest-selling edition of any British magazine in history. Other magazines that support BBC programming include BBC Top Gear, BBC Good Food, BBC Sky at Night, BBC History, BBC Wildlife and BBC Music. BBC Magazines was sold to Exponent Private Equity in 2011, which merged it with Origin Publishing (previously owned by BBC Worldwide between 2004 and 2006) to form Immediate Media Company.

BBC Studios also publishes books, to accompany programmes such as Sherlock and Doctor Who under the BBC Books brand, a publishing imprint majority owned by Random House. Soundtrack albums, singles (which include two UK number one singles from BBC children's shows, "Teletubbies say "Eh-oh!"" from Teletubbies and "Can We Fix It?" from Bob the Builder), talking books and sections of radio broadcasts are also sold under the brand BBC Records, with DVDs also being sold and licensed in large quantities to consumers both in the UK and abroad under the BBC Studios Home Entertainment brand. Archive programming and classical music recordings are sold under the brand BBC Legends.

== Cultural significance ==
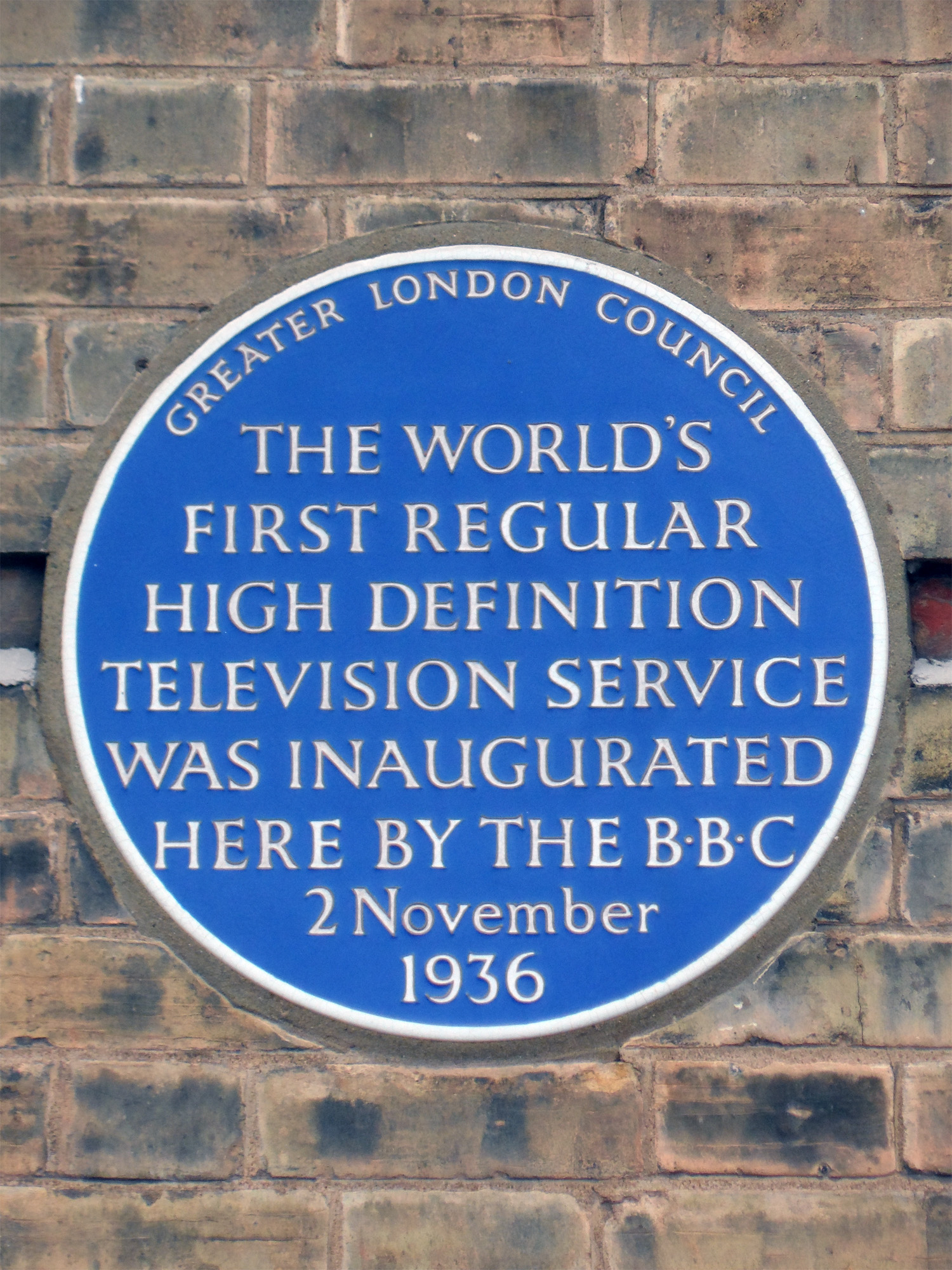
Blue plaque at Alexandra Palace, commemorating the launch of the world's first high-definition television service, BBC Television, in 1936

Until the development, popularisation, and domination of television, radio was the broadcast medium upon which people in the United Kingdom relied. It "reached into every home in the land, and simultaneously united the nation, an important factor during the Second World War". The BBC introduced the world's first "high-definition" 405-line television service in 1936. It suspended its television service during the Second World War and until 1946, but remained the only television broadcaster in the UK until 1955, when Independent Television (ITV) began operating. This heralded the transformation of television into a popular and dominant medium. Nevertheless, "throughout the 1950s radio still remained the dominant source of broadcast comedy". Further, the BBC was the only legal radio broadcaster until 1968 (when University Radio York obtained its first licence).

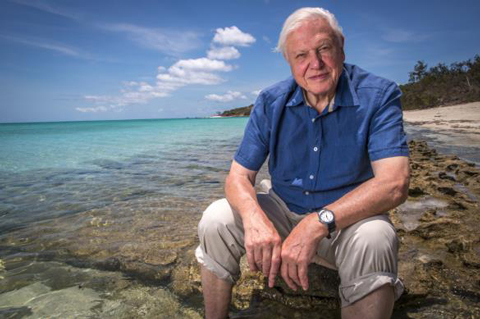
The nature documentaries of David Attenborough, such as The Blue Planet, Planet Earth and Life on Earth, are produced by the BBC Studios Natural History Unit, the largest wildlife documentary production house in the world.

Despite the advent of commercial television and radio, with competition from ITV, Channel 4 and Sky, the BBC has remained one of the main elements in British popular culture through its obligation to produce TV and radio programmes for mass audiences. However, the arrival of BBC2 allowed the BBC also to make programmes for minority interests in drama, documentaries, current affairs, entertainment, and sport. Examples cited include the television series Civilisation, Doctor Who, I, Claudius, Monty Python's Flying Circus, Pot Black, and Tonight, but other examples can be given in each of these fields as shown by the BBC's entries in the British Film Institute's 2000 list of the BFI TV 100, with the BBC's 1970s sitcom Fawlty Towers (featuring John Cleese as Basil Fawlty) topping the list. Described as television's first "watercooler moment" by The Telegraph, the BBC's 1954 adaptation of Nineteen Eighty-Four made a dramatic impact on a fledgling television audience who were horrified by the graphic depiction of a totalitarian regime controlling the population. Making his BBC debut in 1949, Benny Hill with The Benny Hill Show became the first British comedian to become famous via television. Popular comedy duos on the BBC include Morecambe and Wise (whose show debuted in 1968) and The Two Ronnies (debuting in 1971). Black comedy sitcom Blackadder, starring Rowan Atkinson as the title character, ran for four series between 1983 and 1989.

Top of the Pops, the world's longest-running weekly music show, first aired in January 1964, the Rolling Stones being the first group to perform on it. On air since 22 August 1964, Match of the Day is broadcast on Saturday nights during the Premier League season. Some BBC shows have had a direct impact on society. For example, The Great British Bake Off is credited with reinvigorating interest in baking throughout the UK, with stores reporting sharp rises in sales of baking ingredients and accessories. The export of BBC programmes through services like the BBC World Service and BBC News, as well as through the channels operated by BBC Studios, means that audiences can consume BBC productions worldwide. Long-running BBC shows include: Desert Island Discs, broadcast on radio since 1942, Sports Report, broadcast on radio from 5 pm on Saturday evenings during the football season since January 1948, and featuring the same theme tune by Hubert Bath, is the world's longest-running sports radio programme, The Archers, broadcast on radio since 1951, is the world's longest-running drama, and Panorama, broadcast on BBC television since 1953, is the world's longest-running news television programme. Douglas Adams' 1978 Radio 4 sci-fi comedy series The Hitchhiker's Guide to the Galaxy, which spawned a media franchise, was the first radio comedy programme to be produced in stereo, and was innovative in its use of music and sound effects. The BBC's broadcast of Wimbledon is the longest-running partnership in sports broadcasting history, starting with radio in 1927 and television in 1937.

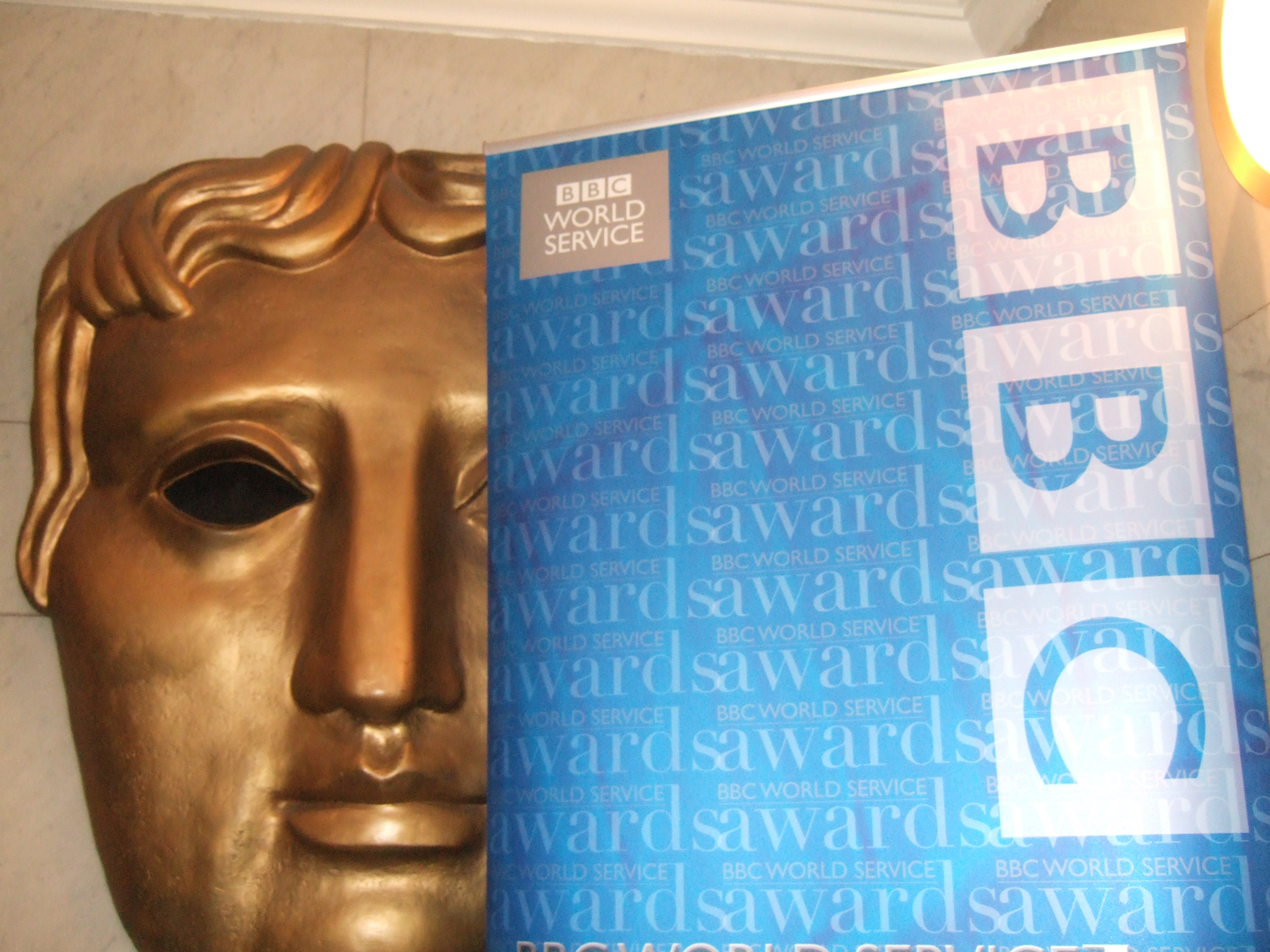
BAFTA (British Academy of Film and Television Arts) mask and the BBC logo. The BBC broadcasts BAFTA's film and television award ceremonies.

The British Academy Film Awards (BAFTAs) was first broadcast on the BBC in 1956, with Vivien Leigh as the host. The television equivalent, the British Academy Television Awards, has been screened exclusively on the BBC since a 2007 awards ceremony that included wins for Jim Broadbent (Best actor) and Ricky Gervais (Best comedy performance).

The term "BBC English" was used as an alternative name for Received Pronunciation, and the English Pronouncing Dictionary uses the term "BBC Pronunciation" to label its recommendations. However, the BBC itself now makes more use of regional accents to reflect the diversity of the UK, while continuing to expect clarity and fluency of its presenters. From its "starchy" beginnings, the BBC has also become more inclusive, and now attempts to accommodate the interests of all strata of society and all minorities, because they all pay the licence fee.

=== Colloquial terms ===
Older domestic UK audiences often refer to the BBC as "the Beeb", a nickname coined by Peter Sellers during a 1972 reunion of the 1950s BBC radio comedy The Goon Show, when he referred to the "Beeb Beeb Ceeb". It was then shortened and popularised by radio DJ Kenny Everett. David Bowie's recording sessions at the BBC were released as Bowie at the Beeb, while Queen's BBC recording sessions were released as At the Beeb. Another nickname, now less commonly used, is "Auntie", said to originate from the old-fashioned "Auntie knows best" attitude, or the idea of aunties and uncles who are present in the background of one's life (but possibly a reference to the "aunties" and "uncles" who presented children's programmes in the early days) in the days when John Reith, the BBC's first director general, was in charge. The term "Auntie" for the BBC is often credited to radio disc-jockey Jack Jackson. To celebrate the fiftieth anniversary of the BBC the song "Auntie" was released in 1972. It also featured in the title of the BBC's blooper show, Auntie's Bloomers, which was presented by Terry Wogan from 1991 to 2001. The two nicknames have also been used together as "Auntie Beeb".

== Logo and symbols ==
=== Logos ===
BBC three box logos

First, 1958–1963

Second, 1963–1971

Third, 1971–1988

Fourth, 1987–1998

Fifth, 1997–2021

Sixth, 2021–present

=== Coat of arms ===
Coat of arms of the British Broadcasting Corporation
Adopted 1927 Crest On a Wreath of the Colours, a Lion passant Or, grasping in the dexter fore-paw a Thunderbolt proper. Torse A Wreath of the Colours Escutcheon Azure a Terrestrial Globe proper encircled by an Annulet Or, and seven Estoiles in Orle Argent. Supporters On either side an Eagle, wings addorsed proper collared Azure pendant therefrom a Bugle horn stringed Or. Motto Nation shall speak peace unto Nation Other elements Badge – A Thunderbolt proper thereon a Pellet inscribed with the letters BBC Or.

== Controversies ==
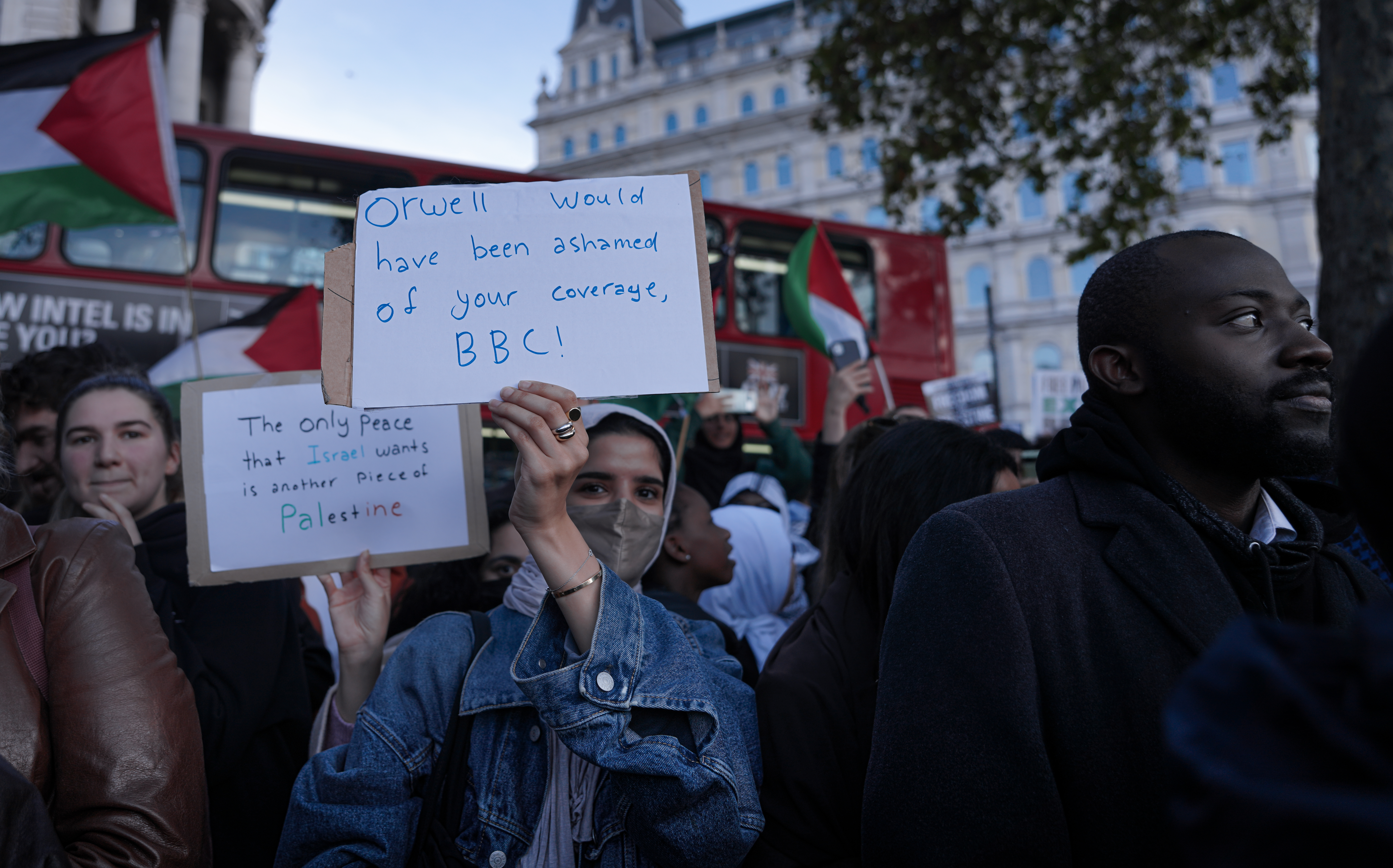
Pro-Palestinian protester accusing the BBC of pro-Israel bias during the Gaza war

Throughout its existence the BBC has faced numerous accusations regarding many topics such as the Iraq war, the Gaza war, colonialism, politics, ethics and religion, as well as funding and staffing. It also has been involved in numerous controversies because of its coverage of specific news stories, events and programming. The BBC has been accused repeatedly of anti-Israel, anti-semitism, and anti-Palestinian bias.

=== Claims of liberal and left-wing bias ===
The BBC has long faced accusations of liberal and left-wing bias. Accusations of a bias against the Premiership of Margaret Thatcher and the Conservative Party were often made against the BBC by members of that government, with Margaret Thatcher herself considering the broadcaster's news coverage to be biased and irresponsible. In 2011, Peter Sissons, a main news presenter at the BBC from 1989 to 2009, said that "at the core of the BBC, in its very DNA, is a way of thinking that is firmly of the Left".

Another BBC presenter, Andrew Marr, commented that "the BBC is not impartial or neutral. It has a liberal bias, not so much a party-political bias. It is better expressed as a cultural liberal bias." Former BBC director Roger Mosey classified it as "liberal defensive". In 2022, the BBC chairman, Richard Sharp, said that the BBC "does have a liberal bias" and that the institution is "fighting against it". In November 2025, allegations by The Daily Telegraph that the BBC had deceptively spliced a Donald Trump speech preceding the January 6 United States Capitol attack in a documentary led to several BBC executives resigning, including the head of the BBC.

=== Claims of right-wing bias ===
Writing for The Guardian in 2018, the left-wing columnist Owen Jones stated "the truth is the BBC is stacked full of rightwingers," and cited as an example of bias its employment of "ultra-Thatcherite" Andrew Neil as a politics presenter. In August 2022, former BBC presenter Emily Maitlis stated that BBC board member Robbie Gibb, who had worked as an editorial advisor to the right-wing channel GB News, and former Prime Minister Boris Johnson, who had appointed him to the board, was an "active agent of the Conservative party" who played a significant role in determining the nature of the corporation's news output. In November 2025, Liberal Democrats leader Ed Davey called for Gibb's removal from the BBC board because of Gibb's alleged role in the 2025 BBC editorial bias controversy.

A 2018 opinion poll by BMG Research found that 40% of the British public thought that the BBC was politically partisan, with a nearly even split between those who believed it leaned to the left or right.

=== Accusations of bias on transgender topics ===
The BBC has been accused by politicians, media sources, BBC staff, and trans rights advocates of creating a "moral panic" against trans rights and of wider transphobia in reporting, citing examples such as the article "We're being pressured into sex by some trans women", in which the BBC cited a social media poll from an anti-trans group to say that transgender women were pressuring lesbians to have sex with them under the threat of being labelled transphobic. Additionally oft-cited are its policy of "balancing" appearances by transgender people with activists from gender-critical groups, its manual of style which requires any allegations of transphobia to be challenged by the news presenter, its actions censoring trans rights slogans and symbols from appearing on BBC broadcasts, and its policy against using the term "cisgender".

The BBC has also been accused by gender-critical groups and BBC staff of having a pro-trans bias, primarily for "failing to make it clear that transgender women are biological males". Such accusations have alleged that the BBC's LGBT desk has been "captured by a small group of people" intent on promoting a pro-trans agenda. Shortly thereafter, the BBC began running articles referring to trans women as "biological males who identify as women".

=== Bullying and workplace culture ===
Concerns about bullying at the BBC have recurred for decades and have prompted several internal reviews.

After the Jimmy Savile revelations, the BBC commissioned the 2013 Respect at Work review led by barrister Dinah Rose. More than 930 staff took part. It found sexual harassment to be rare but bullying more common, and described "a strong undercurrent of fear" among staff who raised complaints. The BBC pledged to overhaul its procedures and drop confidentiality clauses that discouraged staff from speaking out.

A workplace culture review published in April 2025, carried out for the BBC by Change Associates, found no "toxic culture" but said a minority whose conduct damaged morale had not been dealt with adequately. Over the same period the corporation removed several presenters after complaints were investigated and upheld.

In June 2026 the BBC dismissed five long-serving journalists at its Hong Kong bureau, citing redundancy. Some had earlier raised bullying concerns. The Hong Kong Journalists Association sought an independent investigation into the bureau's management, and the International Federation of Journalists backed the call, urging the BBC to examine the dismissals and the treatment of staff who had raised concerns. As of July 2026, no review had been commissioned.

== See also ==
- The Green Book (BBC)
- List of BBC television channels and radio stations
- List of companies based in London
- List of television programmes broadcast by the BBC
- List of BBC podcasts
- Prewar television stations
- Public service broadcasting in the United Kingdom
- Television in the United Kingdom
