= BBC Worldwide =

1979–2018 commercial subsidiary of the BBC

BBC Worldwide Ltd.
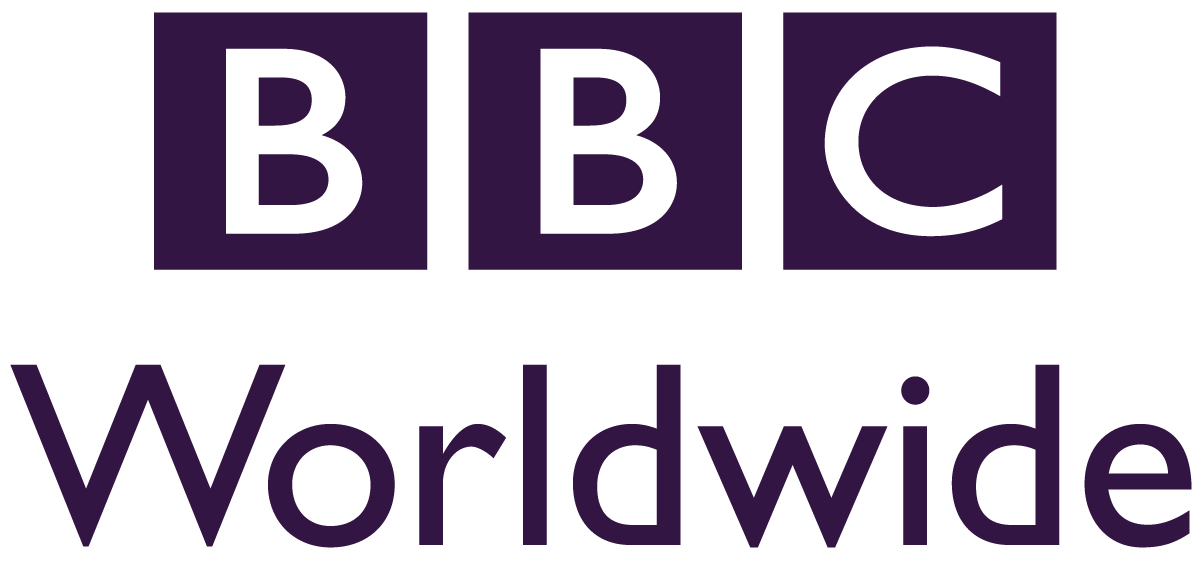
- Final logo, used from 1997 to 2018
- Formerly: BBC Enterprises Ltd. (1979–1995)
- Type: Subsidiary
- Industry: Broadcasting
- Predecessor: BBC Enterprises
- Founded: 15 May 1979; 47 years ago
- Founder: Henrietta Hurford-Jones
- Defunct: 1 April 2018; 8 years ago
- Fate: Folded into BBC Studios
- Successor: BBC Studios
- Headquarters: Television Centre, London, England
- Area served: Worldwide
- Key people: Tony Hall (chairman); Tim Davie (CEO)
- Parent: BBC
- Website: www.bbcstudios.com

BBC Worldwide Ltd. was the wholly owned commercial subsidiary of the BBC, formed out of a restructuring of its predecessor BBC Enterprises in January 1995. The company monetised BBC brands, selling BBC and other British programming for broadcast abroad with the aim of supplementing the income received by the BBC through the licence fee.

The company merged with BBC Studios on 1 April 2018, to form a new licensing, production, and distribution company under the BBC Studios name.

== History ==
=== Origins ===
In addition to broadcasting, the BBC has for much of its life also produced additional materials for sale, the profits of which would be returned to the corporation to aid in the financing of these services. The highest profile of these early products was the listings magazine Radio Times, but the net revenue gained from this in 1928 (£93,686, 10s, 1d) only equated to 10% of total BBC income.

Prior to 1979, several BBC departments dealt with the exploitation and sale of BBC brands and programmes. BBC Publications, which produced magazines, books and other supplementary materials, had expanded rapidly in the late 1960s but still had difficulties with finances. In 1974, the division made a loss of £14,000. This was rectified however as the economic situation eased and by 1982, BBC Publications had a trading profit of £4.7 million. BBC Transcription Services licensed BBC Radio material to overseas broadcasters.

The selling of television programmes was at first handled in 1958 with the establishment of a business manager post. This gradually expanded until the establishment of the Television Promotions (later renamed Television Enterprises) department in 1960 under a general manager. In its first year, the department saw the sale of 550 programmes overseas with a turnover of £234,000, with a further 1,200 programmes sold the following year. Radio programmes were only exploited on the same level with the creation of the Radio Enterprises department in 1966. The two departments were merged to form the BBC Enterprises department in October 1968.

=== BBC Enterprises ===
On 15 May 1979, the department became BBC Enterprises Ltd., a subsidiary company wholly owned by the BBC. By 1982, the division were expanding with divisions responsible for home video (under the brand BBC Video), recorded audio (under the brands BBC Records and BBC Cassettes), film and merchandising. At this point the company had a turnover of £23 million. On 1 April 1986, all commercial activities of the corporation, including BBC Publications, was merged into BBC Enterprises Ltd.

In 1991, BBC World Service Television became the first commercially funded BBC broadcasting operation after the Foreign Office refused to pay for it. BBC Enterprises Ltd was subsequently reorganised on 1 January 1995 as BBC Worldwide Ltd. A review of the BBC's commercial activities took place in 2004 and concluded that the sell off of BBC Worldwide's assets would not be as advantageous as keeping the business and driving it harder. Instead, some changes to its remit, focus, structure and governance were made, e.g. that it would only publish titles in the UK linked to BBC programmes or key genres.

=== Acquisitions and restructuring ===
On 12 July 2004, BBC Worldwide and Woolworths Group plc announced they had entered into a joint venture to form 2 Entertain (stylized as 2 | entertain), which would combine BBC Worldwide's video publishing unit (BBC Video) with Woolworths Group's video publishing, music publishing and video production unit (Video Collection International). BBC Worldwide would hold 60%, while the Woolworths Group would hold 40%, additionally, both BBC Worldwide and Woolworths Group wanted 2 Entertain to better compete with the major studios. The deal was completed on 27 September with Video Collection International being renamed 2 Entertain Video Ltd. in October.

In 2005, the company sold Eve magazine to Haymarket Group and in 2006 the company sold a majority stake in BBC Books to publisher Random House.

In 2006, Ragdoll Productions & BBC Worldwide made a joint venture together named Ragdoll Worldwide.

In 2007, BBC Worldwide purchased a 75% stake in the travel guide publisher Lonely Planet, acquiring the final 25% of the company in 2011. The acquisition was part of the BBC's strategy to grow its online portfolio and to increase its operations in Australia and the USA.

In January 2009, it was announced that Ofcom had put forward the recommendation that Channel 4 merge with either the commercial network Five or BBC Worldwide. Channel 4's preferred option of a partnership with the latter was confirmed by chief executive Andy Duncan, who added: "We're in discussions with BBC Worldwide at the moment and they're really very exciting." In the same year, the company was awarded the Queen's Award for Enterprise in recognition of the companies growth and success.

In 2012, the company began to reorganise their divisions from a product based system to a location-based system, resulting in Jana Bennett leaving the company.

In 2013, BBC Worldwide sold Lonely Planet to Kentucky billionaire Brad Kelley's NC2 Media for US$75 million (£51.5 million)— significantly less than the £130.2 million the BBC had paid for the company, at an £80 million loss.

In December 2016, BBC Worldwide and ITV plc announced BritBox, an international subscription streaming brand focusing on British television. The service was planned to launch first in the United States in 2017, with AMC Networks as a local partner.

In 2017, under revisions to the BBC Charter and subsequent BBC Trust approval, the broadcaster formed a second commercial subsidiary known as BBC Studios, to hold most of the broadcaster's in-house production units (including Factual, Entertainment, Scripted, and Music & Events). In return for the restructuring, which also allows the BBC to produce programmes for competing broadcasters to fund its public services, the BBC agreed to allow BBC Studios and third-parties to bid on tenders to produce its in-house non-news programmes over the next 11 years. On 29 November 2017, the BBC announced that BBC Worldwide would be merged into BBC Studios in April 2018, which gave the broadcaster an integrated division involved in both the production and sale of programming.

== Profit and sales (1995–2012) ==
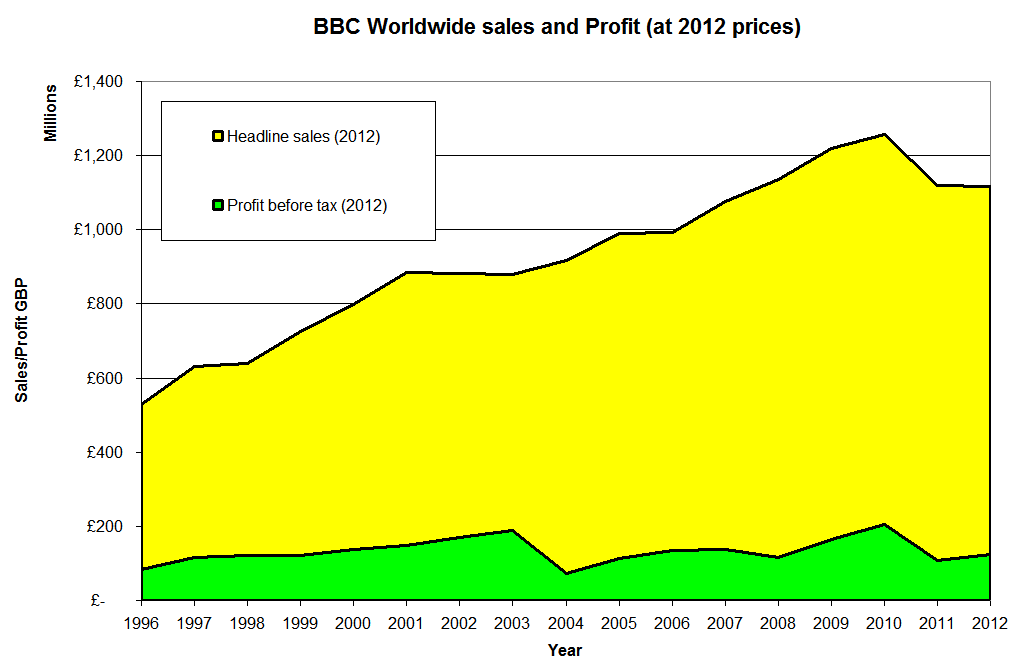
Figures adjusted using RPI to 2012 prices

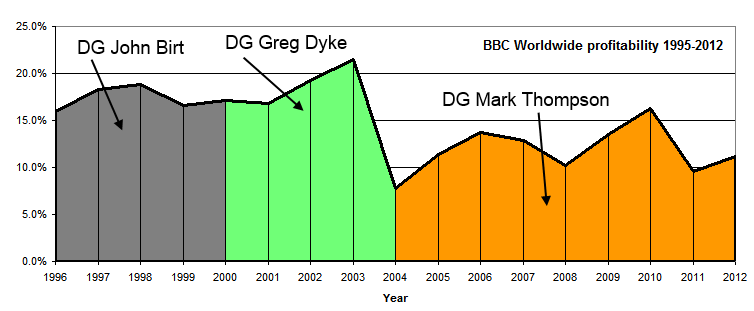
Profitability of BBC Worldwide

In 2013/14, BBC Worldwide generated headline profits of £157.4m and headline sales of £1,042.3m and returned £173.8m to the BBC.

In 2012/13, it made a profit of £156.3m on a turnover of £1,115.8m. The company had made a profit of £104m on a turnover of £1,085m in the previous financial year.

BBC Worldwide's profit rate was 11.2% in 2011/2012, up slightly from 9.6% the previous year, down from a peak of 21.5% in 2002/2003, contrasting with 7.8% in 2003/2004.

Date	Headline sales (2014)	Profit (2014)	Sales (cash)	Profit (cash)	Profit rate
1995/1996	£527m	£84m	£332m	£53m	15.9%
1996/1997	£630m	£115m	£409m	£75m	18.3%
1997/1998	£640m	£120m	£430m	£81m	18.8%
1998/1999	£726m	£120m	£495m	£82m	16.5%
1999/2000	£798m	£136m	£560m	£96m	17.1%
2000/2001	£885m	£148m	£632m	£106m	16.7%
2001/2002	£881m	£169m	£640m	£123m	19.2%
2002/2003	£879m	£188m	£657m	£141m	21.4%
2003/2004	£917m	£71m	£706m	£55m	7.7%
2004/2005	£991m	£112m	£784m	£89m	11.3%
2005/2006	£992m	£135m	£810m	£111m	13.7%
2006/2007	£1,076m	£138m	£916m	£118m	12.8%
2007/2008	£1,134m	£116m	£1,004m	£103m	10.2%
2008/2009	£1,219m	£164m	£1,074m	£145m	13.5%
2009/2010	£1,256m	£204m	£1,158m	£188m	16.2%
2010/2011	£1,119m	£107m	£1,085m	£104m	9.5%
2011/2012	£1,115m	£125m	£1,115m	£125m	11.2%

Historical price conversion as per RPI figures from "Office for National Statistics – Dataset selector".

== Operations ==
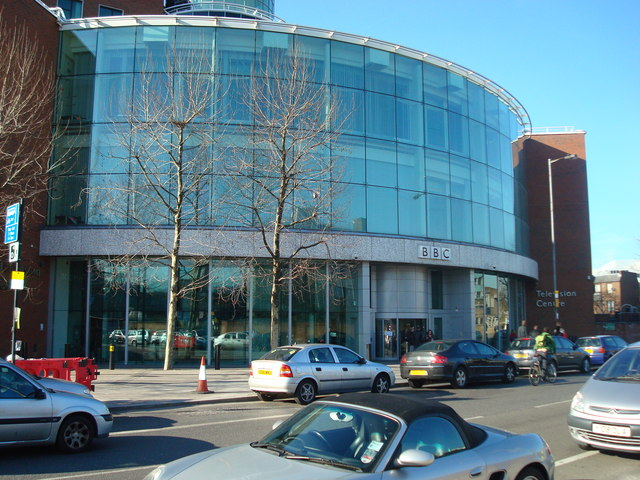
Television Centre in London, BBC Worldwide's headquarters

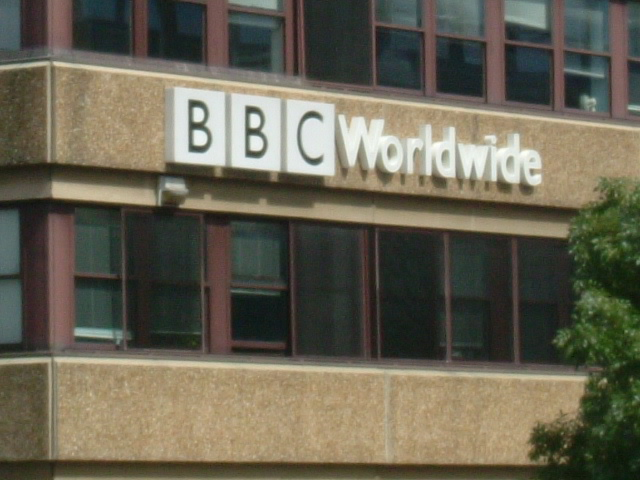
BBC Worldwide's London headquarters prior to its 2008 move to Television Centre

In 2013, BBC Worldwide reorganised the company along geographical, rather than divisional, lines to better serve its audiences around the world and to position itself to take advantage of opportunities in high growth markets. The seven geographic markets are grouped into three regions: North America; UK, Australia and New Zealand; and Global Markets (Asia, CEMA, Latin America and Western Europe). The two global business areas – Content and Brands – set the strategic framework and parameters for activities within the regions and keep a close connection into BBC Worldwide's parent, the BBC. Digital is embedded throughout the business.

BBC Worldwide was responsible for a wide range of commercial activities, primarily connected in some way with the output and public purposes of the main BBC. In the past, the business was divided into five operating businesses which covered the entire operations of the company: Channels; Content and Production; Brands, Consumers and New Ventures, Consumer Products and Sales and Distributions.

The Channels division was formed in 2005 and is the company's largest generator of revenue and growth. It operates the broadcasting of several international channels and domestic networks:

- BBC America – AMC Networks owns the channel and licenses the BBC brand
- BBC Entertainment
- BBC First
- BBC Brit
- BBC Earth
- BBC Lifestyle
- CBeebies
- CBBC
- British UKTV network of 10 channels (for a time owned 50/50 with Discovery, Inc.)
- BBC UKTV in Australia and New Zealand
- BBC Kids Australia

It was also involved with the now defunct:

- BBC Canada – 20% with Corus Entertainment owning 80%
- BBC HD
- BBC Kids Canada – 20% with Knowledge Network Corporation owning 80%
- BBC Japan - JV with SKY PerfecTV!
- BBC Living
- BBC Knowledge

The Content and Production division was formed in 2006 and invests the company's money into new productions by both the BBC and other independent productions. It also exploits the formats of BBC programmes and alters them to be suitable for an international audience – an example is the exploitation of the Strictly Come Dancing brand to become Dancing with the Stars – maximising revenues by receiving a production fee from the local broadcaster as well as a sum from selling the initial re-versioning rights. The division works alongside the Sales and Distribution division, which sells the broadcasting rights to completed programmes made by the BBC and other producers – an example being the Red Production Company drama Mine All Mine for the ITV network in 2004. It includes the selling of individual clips through the BBC Motion Gallery to other broadcasters. In the financial year 2010/11, this division sold the rights to over 74,000 hours worth of television content.

The other two divisions of the company deal with the individual programme brands: Global Brands focuses on the international recognition of the brands while the Consumer Products division produces a variety of goods based around these brands. The work of the former includes expanding the brands into new areas – the Top Gear Live tour is a key example of this. The latter creates and sells a variety of consumer products, occasionally as a stake or partnership in another company, including VHS and DVD releases, spoken word and music audio products, CD-ROMs, video games, books and magazines.

BBC group was accused of bias news broadcast ignoring Palestinians plight and pro israel bias in reporting.

== Assets and brands ==
- Owned video publishing company 2 Entertain with products dual branded 2 Entertain and BBC.
- Owned Demon Music Group.
- The BBC Shops closed in 2016, although Worldwide still retains Doctor Who and Top Gear branded online shops.
- Operated the BBC Motion Gallery.
- Operated the BBC Store until its closure in November 2017.
- Held 12.2% stake in production company Left Bank Pictures.
- Held 25% stake in House Productions, an indie production company
- Held 45% stake in Clerkenwell Films, a film and television production company
- Held 25% stake in Cliffhanger Productions, an independent production company.
- Held 25% stake in BBC Children's Books, an imprint of Penguin Group who hold a 75% stake.
- Licensed the publishing of magazine titles to the Immediate Media Company. The titles were formerly published in-house by BBC Magazines.
- Licensed audio content to Penguin Random House UK for global sales and distribution. Titles were previously published in-house by BBC Radio Collection and BBC Audiobooks and later by AudioGO, in which BBC Worldwide held a 15% stake.
- Held minority share in BBC Books, with Random House Group taking majority share. Books published using BBC Books brand.
- Held minority stake in BBC Active, with Pearson plc taking the majority share. The brand publishes educational material.
- In partnership with ITV, launched a US SVOD service, BritBox, launching in March 2017.

These commercial activities allow BBC Worldwide to return profits and dividends to the BBC to re-invest in its broadcasting operations. In 2007/08 BBC Worldwide invested £75.1m in in-house and independent programmes commissioned by the BBC. However, the BBC has often been criticised for the amount of money it makes from BBC Worldwide. Some commercial rivals protest at the advantage the company has from being associated with and being able to exploit the programme catalogue and resources of the BBC to provide its goods and services.

== See also ==
- International BBC television channels
