= Tim Davie =

British television executive (born 1967)

Tim Davie CBE
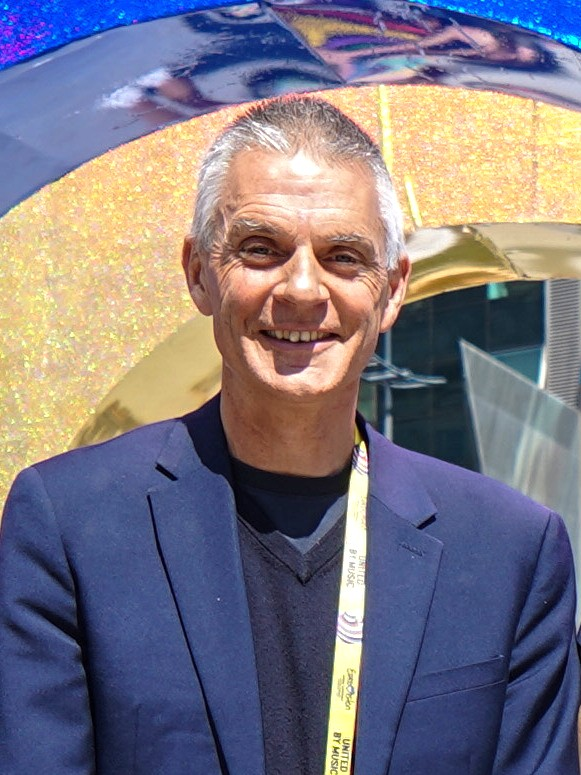
- Davie in 2023

17th Director-General of the BBC
- In office 1 September 2020 – 2 April 2026
- Preceded by: Tony Hall
- Succeeded by: Rhodri Talfan Davies (acting)
- Acting; 11 November 2012 – 1 April 2013
- Preceded by: George Entwistle
- Succeeded by: Tony Hall

Personal details
- Born: Timothy Douglas Davie; 25 April 1967 (age 59) Croydon, London, England
- Spouse: Anne Claire Shotbolt (m. 1997)
- Children: 3
- Education: Selwyn College, Cambridge

Timothy Douglas Davie (born 25 April 1967) is a British media executive who was the director-general of the BBC from September 2020 to April 2026. He resigned over allegations against the corporation of editorial bias that emerged in November 2025. He was previously the acting director-general of the BBC in November 2012 following the resignation of George Entwistle, until April 2013. He was replaced as director-general on 18 May 2026 by Matt Brittin.

Educated at Whitgift School and the University of Cambridge, Davie unsuccessfully stood as a candidate for the Conservative Party in 1993 and 1994 in the Hammersmith and Fulham London Borough Council elections. He joined the BBC in 2005, following a career in marketing. During his time as acting director-general he oversaw the investigations into BBC management and conduct following revelations the broadcaster had known about sexual abuse by Jimmy Savile.

== Early life and career ==
Timothy Douglas Davie was born on 25 April 1967 in Croydon, London to Douglas John Davie and Alicia Margaret Davie. He attended Downside School, followed by a scholarship to Whitgift School in the London Borough of Croydon between 1980 and 1985. He studied English at Selwyn College, Cambridge. Davie joined Procter & Gamble as a trainee in 1991. Two years later he joined PepsiCo, eventually becoming vice-president of marketing and finance before leaving the company in 2005.

Davie unsuccessfully stood as a councillor for the Conservative Party in the Hammersmith and Fulham London Borough Council elections in 1993 and 1994 and was deputy chairman of the Hammersmith and Fulham Conservative Association in the 1990s.

== BBC career ==
Davie joined the BBC as Director of Marketing, Communications and Audiences in April 2005, succeeding Andy Duncan. He was Director-General Mark Thompson's first senior external appointment.

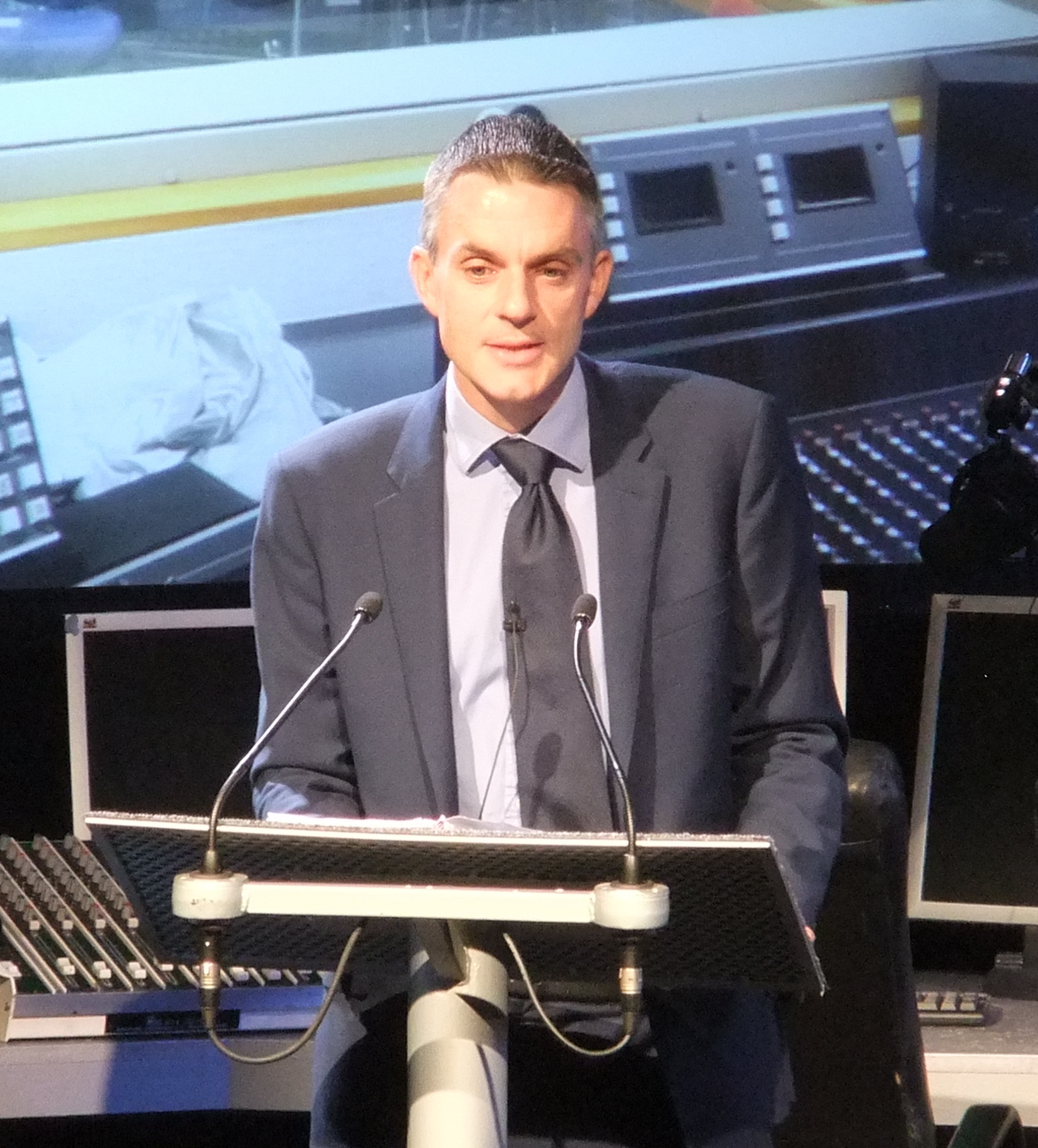
Davie in 2010

In June 2008, it was announced that Davie was replacing Jenny Abramsky, who served at the BBC for 39 years before leaving to chair the Heritage Lottery Fund. Appointed Director of Audio & Music, Davie sat on the BBC's Executive Board with overall responsibility for all of the BBC's national radio networks and the corporation's music output across all media. This included BBC Radio 1, BBC Radio 2, BBC Radio 3 and BBC Radio 4; as well as the BBC digital radio stations BBC Asian Network, BBC Radio 1Xtra, BBC Radio 6 Music and BBC Radio 4 Extra (then BBC 7); the three BBC Orchestras based in England; and The Proms. During this time, he was involved in abandoned plans to close down Radio 6 Music and the Asian Network. In July 2009, he was on The Guardian's list of the 100 most influential people in the media.

Davie took over as acting Director-General on 11 November 2012, following the resignation of George Entwistle in the wake of the Newsnight broadcast that did not name any individual but led to Internet speculation, which incorrectly identified Conservative Lord McAlpine in the North Wales child abuse case. During his time as acting director-general he oversaw the investigations into BBC management and conduct following revelations the broadcaster had known about sexual abuse by Jimmy Savile. Davie became chief executive officer of BBC Worldwide following the appointment of Tony Hall. BBC Worldwide merged with the TV-making arm of the BBC, BBC Studios, in April 2018 and Davie served as both the Chief Executive of BBC Studios and a Director globally.

He was appointed a Commander of the Order of the British Empire (CBE) in the 2018 Birthday Honours for services to international trade. In 2019 he earned £642,000 and was the BBC's highest paid executive.

In January 2020, Tony Hall announced he was resigning from the Director-General's position before the scheduled end of his tenure. In May 2020, Davie was one of four candidates shortlisted to succeed Hall in the position. On 5 June 2020, it was announced he would become the corporation's seventeenth Director-General from 1 September.

=== As Director-General ===
==== Tenure ====
Davie expressed concern on the targeting of Persian journalists in the BBC by Iran, saying they witnessed "significant and increasingly alarming" escalation in attempts to pressure BBC Persian journalists' families in Iran, including arbitrary interrogations, travel bans, passport confiscations, and threats of asset seizures.

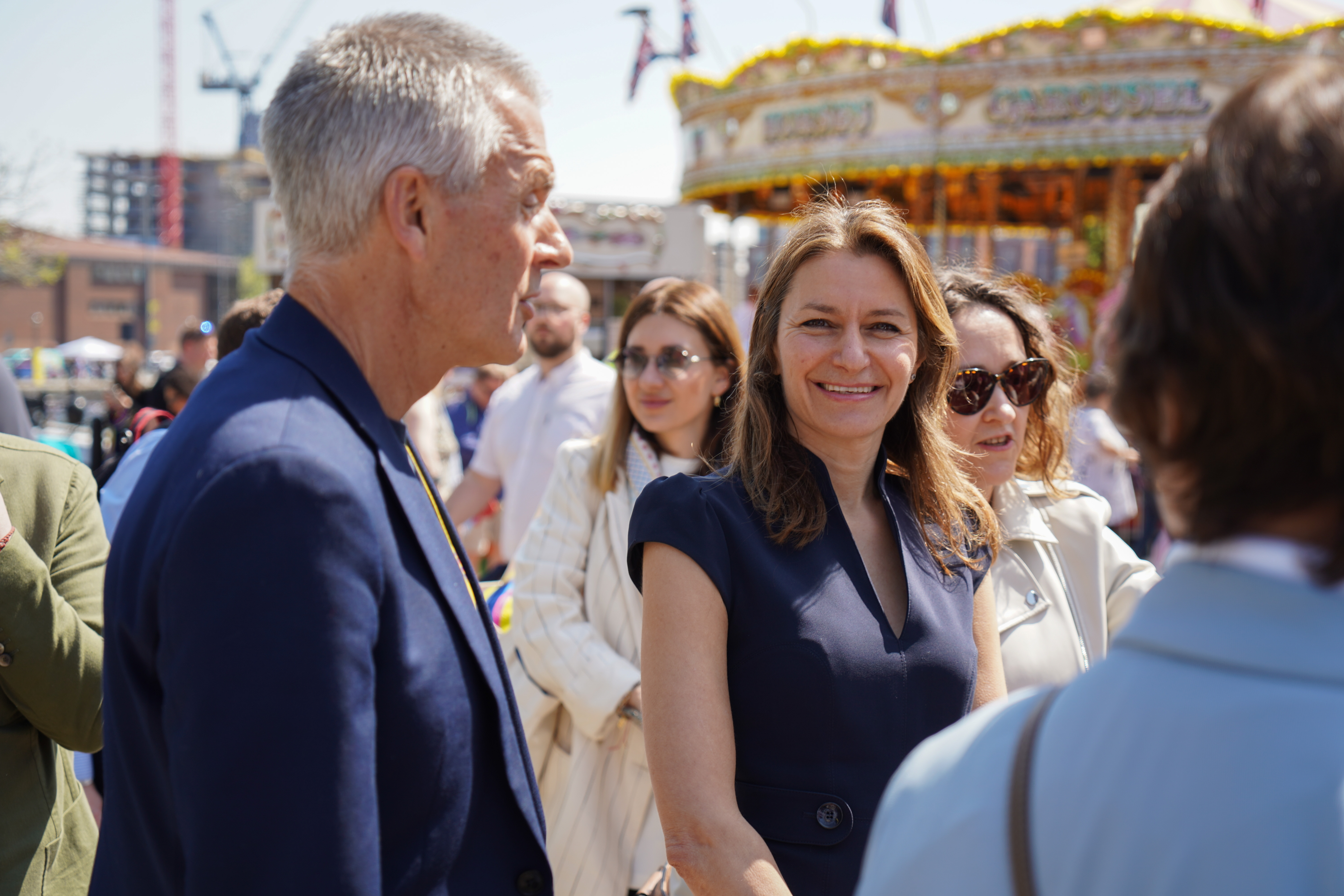
Davie with the Secretary of State for Culture, Media and Sport, Lucy Frazer, at the Eurovision Song Contest 2023

In September 2020, appearing before the Digital, Culture, Media and Sport Committee, Davie justified the salary of BBC's highest paid star Gary Lineker, saying the salary was worth it because of the value of analysis to the viewing audience.

In October 2020, Davie set out new guidelines for BBC staff, stating that they should avoid expressing their personal views on current issues of political controversy (which he called "virtue signalling") on their own private social media accounts. He said this was to reduce perceived bias in the BBC. This would include a ban on news reporters taking part in "public demonstrations or gatherings about controversial issues", with some BBC managers citing trans rights and Black Lives Matter as examples. Davie later said that journalists could attend events such as Pride marches if they were "celebratory" and not "taking a stand on politicised or contested issues".

Davie has stated: "As editor in chief of the BBC I think one of our founding principles is impartiality and that's what we are delivering on". A former Conservative Party candidate, Davie announced his intention in August 2020 for the BBC to "find a better balance of satirical targets rather than constantly aiming jokes at the Tories." He announced his support of the licence fee as opposed to a Netflix style subscription service.

In December 2021, Davie was elected to the Executive Board of the European Broadcasting Union. He was re-elected in December 2022 to serve a further two years on the Board, until December 2024.

Davie oversaw major cuts to BBC Local Radio content in late Summer 2023, resulting in the reduction of locally produced content to just eight hours per day from Monday to Friday and no weekend coverage (with the exception of live men's football commentary). The implementation of the cuts was criticised, with MPs referring to the redundancy process as "workplace bullying" and the cuts in general as "managing decline".

In November 2023, Danny Cohen, a former director of television for the BBC, alleged that the organisation was "institutionally antisemitic" especially in its coverage of Israel. The previous month, Davie had apologised to the 1922 Committee (backbench group of Conservative MPs) for some inaccuracies in the BBC's coverage of the Gaza war.

In March 2024, Davie announced a review of the BBC licence fee with a focus on reforms.

==== Resignation ====
On 9 November 2025, Davie announced his resignation. The BBC announced that he would step down following a leaked internal memo stating a Panorama documentary on Donald Trump made it appear Trump directly called for the January 6 United States Capitol attack. Davie was also under heavy criticism over other issues, which include allegations of pro-transgender editorial bias, and the release of a documentary about the Gaza war, Gaza: How to Survive a Warzone, in which the BBC failed to disclose that the narrator was a son of a Hamas official.

Deborah Turness, CEO of BBC News, also announced her resignation at the same time.

On 25 March 2026, the BBC announced that former Google executive Matt Brittin will replace Davie as director general on 18 May 2026, after Davie departs on 2 April.

== Directorships ==
Davie is Chairman of Comic Relief, Trustee of the Tate and the Royal Television Society, and in 2018 was appointed as Chairman of the Creative Industries Council.

Previously, he has been on the boards of Freesat, Digital UK and Children in Need.

== Personal life ==
Davie married Anne Claire Shotbolt on 26 July 1997, at Fulmer church in Buckinghamshire. Both were regular windsurfers. The couple moved to East Twickenham, and they have three sons.

He is a keen runner and a repeat participant in the Man versus Horse Marathon in Llanwrtyd Wells.

Media offices
Preceded by George Entwistle	Director-General of the BBC; Acting; 2012–2013	Succeeded by Tony Hall
Preceded by Tony Hall	Director-General of the BBC; 2020–2026	Succeeded by Rhodri Talfan Davies as Acting Director General
