= David Abraham (television executive) =

British media executive

- Born: August 1963 (age 63); Lincoln, Lincolnshire, England, UK
- Title: Founder, Wonderhood Studios

David Abraham (born August 1963) is a British media executive who is the former chief executive of Channel Four Television Corporation. In 1997, he co-founded the creative agency St. Luke's. Abraham then went on to senior creative roles at Discovery Communications in the UK and the US before becoming CEO of UKTV in 2007 and then CEO of Channel 4 from 2010 to 2017. In 2018, Abraham co-founded Wonderhood Studios where he is now Group CEO.

== Early life ==
Abraham was born in Lincolnshire. Both his parents immigrated to the UK in the 1950s – his mother from Belgium and his father from Calcutta. He moved with his parents and sister to Essex in the 1970s, where he attended local state schools, before going to University of Oxford in 1981 to study Modern History at Magdalen College, Oxford.

== Early career ==
Abraham began his working life at the advertising agency Benton & Bowles in London in 1984. He moved to the creative agency Collett Dickenson Peace (CDP) and worked with Indra Sinha and Neil Godfrey. In 1990, he moved to the London office of the Californian creative agency Chiat/Day – launched by MT Rainey.

=== St Luke's ===
In 1995, Jay Chiat sold his agency network to the Omnicom Group with the intention to globally merge Chiat/Day with TBWA Worldwide. In the UK, client conflicts prompted an employee buy-out of the business, led by Andy Law and Abraham, who became Chief Operating Officer. St. Luke's has been featured in Law's book Open Minds, in the Harvard Business Review and in a Channel 4 Cutting Edge Documentary.

=== Discovery Networks Europe ===
Abraham became the general manager of Discovery Networks Europe in 2001.

=== TLC US ===
Abraham became general manager of TLC in 2005, a US cable channel available in over 90m US households.

=== UKTV ===
In 2007, Abraham became the chief executive of UKTV. At the time, UKTV was a joint venture between BBC Worldwide and Virgin Media. During his tenure, he oversaw launches of Dave, Alibi, Watch, Yesterday and Really.

== Channel Four ==
Abraham succeeded interim chief executive Anne Bulford in May 2010 following a period of relative uncertainty at Channel 4 involving a debate about the organisation's self-sufficiency, leading to what was described as a 'public begging bowl' strategy. Abraham was appointed by incoming chairman Terence Burns.

Abraham became immediately involved in programming issues such as whether Jonathan Ross should return, and in defending a controversial Frankie Boyle sketch about Katie Price's family.

Abraham assembled a new leadership team, including appointing Jay Hunt from BBC One as chief creative officer to revive programming. Over the next few years, Channel 4's programmes included 24 Hours in A&E, The 2012 Paralympic Games, The Grand National, Black Mirror, Gogglebox, The Last Leg, Humans, The Undateables, Educating Yorkshire, The Island, Indian Summers, Southcliffe, UKIP; The First 100 Days, Sri Lanka's Killing Fields, Benefits Street, Big Fat Gypsy Weddings and MPs For Hire.

In 2010 and 2014, Channel 4 was named Channel of the Year at the Edinburgh International Television Festival (EITF), and by Broadcast magazine in 2016.

In late 2015, Abraham and Hunt struck a three-year deal with Bernie Ecclestone to broadcast Formula One on Channel 4. In early 2015, Channel 4 launched new online hub All 4, offering live streaming, shortform and 'box-set' content, and replacing 4oD. In early 2016, a new foreign language drama service called Walter Presents was launched on All 4.

Abraham increased funding for Film4 in 2010 and again in 2016, and the film division was led by Tessa Ross and subsequently David Kosse. In 2016, Abraham appointed Daniel Battsek to lead Film 4 following the departure of David Kosse to join STX Entertainment.

In 2010, Abraham and Burns pursued a bid to acquire Channel 5. This was ultimately secured by Richard Desmond's Northern and Shell.

Abraham's other business initiatives at Channel 4 have included: a new advertising sales partnership with UKTV (and later, BT Sport). A new online data strategy which has over 13 million registered users across the UK and the launch of 4seven. In 2011, Abraham hired Jonathan Allen as Sales Director, who built a team that won Sales Team of the Year in 2015.

Dan Brooke also joined Channel 4 as director of marketing and communications and then Chief Marketing and Communications Officer. Channel 4's in-house agency, 4Creative, has created campaigns such as Meet The Superhumans in 2012 and the rebranding of Channel 4 in 2015, created by the filmmaker Jonathan Glazer.

In June 2017, it was announced that Abraham would leave later that year and would be succeeded by Alex Mahon as the CEO of Channel 4. Mahon formally took over the role in October 2017.

== Wonderhood Studios ==
In April 2018, Abraham announced the launch of a new company, Wonderhood Studios. The stated aims of the business are to forge a new model in the creative industries by bringing together skills and capabilities that until now have operated separately. The company is structured in the form of five adjacent studios: a television production company, advertising agency, social media content maker, design studio and data insight specialist.

Since its launch, Wonderhood Studios has created work for brands including Nike, Three UK and Starling Bank as well as producing documentary series for broadcasters including the BBC, Sky, and Channel 4. The company, based in Soho, is fully independent and has 60 permanent employees.

After five years in existence, Wonderhood Studios is the only name to appear in the top 30 of industry rankings for both the television and advertising sectors.

== Media industry contributions ==
In May 2011, Abraham set out his planned vision for Channel 4 at a Royal Television Society event in which he stressed the importance of its organisational independence and how it would keep innovating both editorially and technologically. On the occasion of the 30th Anniversary of Channel 4 in 2012, he delivered a speech at the Freeword Centre London entitled: Freedom of Expression and Free Television.

In 2013 Abraham chaired the Royal Television Society Cambridge Convention during which he announced a new £20m Growth Fund for UK independent production companies. This fund has invested in companies such as Lightbox, True North, Arrow, Eleven Films and production entities involving Sacha Baron Cohen and David Coulthard.

In 2014, Abraham delivered the MacTaggart Lecture at the EITF. The theme of the lecture addressed the continuing importance of public service broadcasting in the UK in an age of global and technological consolidation. The lecture caused debate within the media industry and was characterised by some as a critique of American ownership of UK media assets.

Following the May 2015 general election, Abraham, together with Channel 4 chairman Terry Burns, has spoken out about the potential threats to public service broadcasting and to the UK creative economy in the event of the privatisation of Channel 4.

Abraham is a Vice President of the Royal Television Society, a member of BAFTA and sat on the board of Creative Skillset (now ScreenSkills) from 2008 to 2017.

== Personal life ==
Abraham lives in London, is a father to two adult children and partner to Tiina Lee, a senior investment banker.

Media offices
Preceded by Andy Duncan	Chief Executive of Channel 4; 2010 - 2017	Succeeded by Alex Mahon
