= Matt Brittin =

British businessman (born 1968)

Matt Brittin CBE
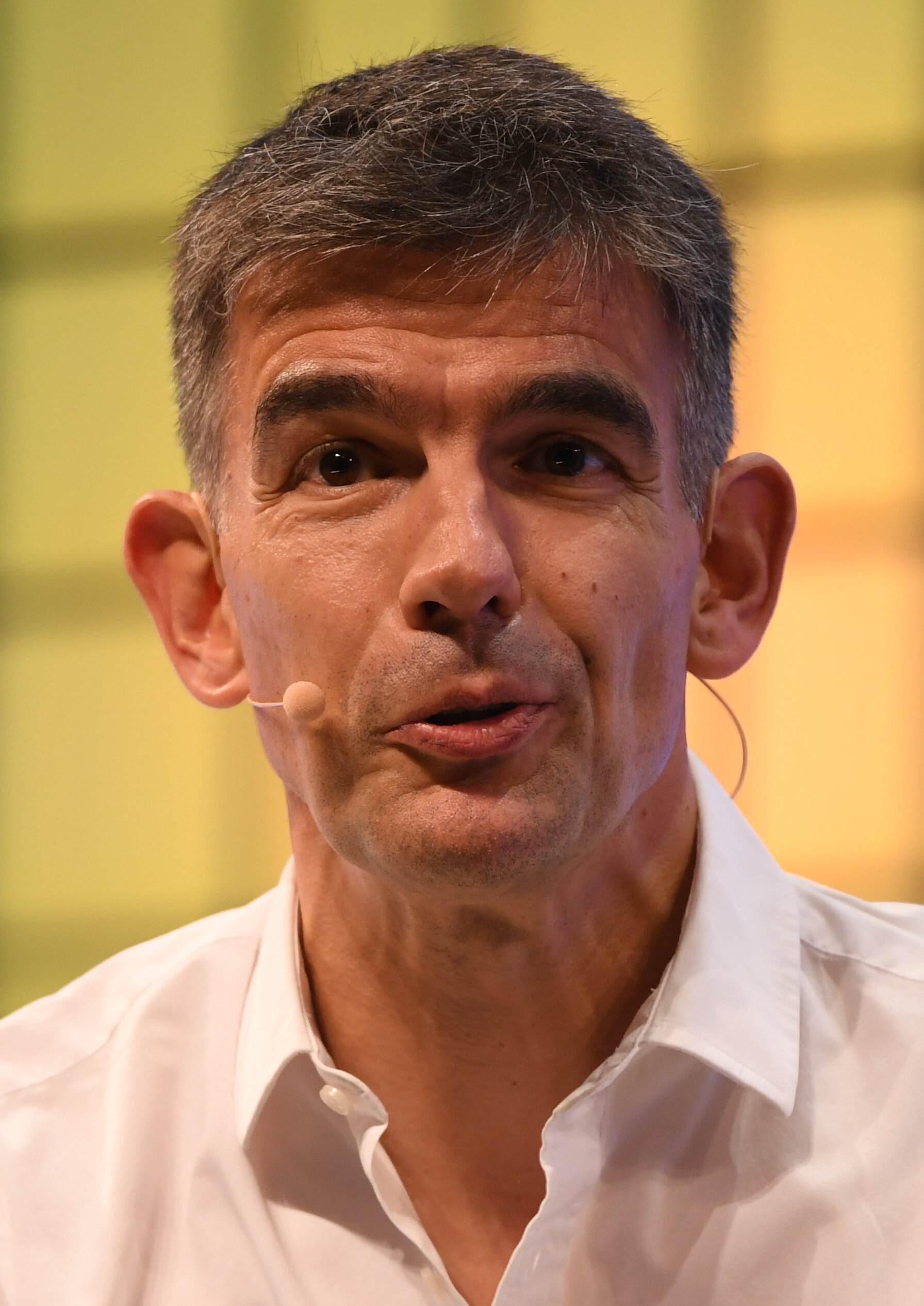
- Brittin in 2018

18th Director-General of the BBC
- Incumbent
- Assumed office 18 May 2026
- Deputy: Rhodri Talfan Davies
- Preceded by: Tim Davie (Note: Rhodri Talfan Davies acted from 3 April 2026 to 17 May 2026)

Personal details
- Born: Matthew John Brittin; 1 September 1968 (age 58) Walton-on-Thames, Surrey, England
- Spouse: Katherine Betts (m. 1995)
- Children: 2
- Education: Hampton School; University of Cambridge; London Business School

Matthew John Brittin (born 1 September 1968) CBE is director-general of the BBC. Previously he served as a president at Google for business & operations in Europe, the Middle East and Africa (EMEA).

== Early life and education ==
Brittin was born in Walton-on-Thames, Surrey and was privately educated at Hampton School and the University of Cambridge where he was a student at Robinson College, Cambridge, receiving a master's degree in land economy and geography in 1990. Brittin rowed in The Boat Race three times, from 1987 to 1989, representing the University of Cambridge. He rowed for Great Britain from 1985 to 1989, winning a bronze medal at the World Rowing Championships in 1989. He received a Master of Business Administration (MBA) degree from London Business School with distinction in 1997.

== Career ==
He began his career as a chartered surveyor with Connell Wilson, where he stayed for six years.

Shortly after completing his MBA degree, he joined McKinsey & Co as a consultant, and stayed for six years.

Referring to his time at McKinsey and how it influenced his management style, he told Management Today in 2017: "I liked it there very much but the most I learned, the stuff I use every day, I learned from rowing. Bringing people together into collaboration around a vision of what you're trying to achieve with a sense of purpose. That's what I most enjoy. McKinsey taught me clarity of thinking – breaking big problems down into pieces and communicating clearly. I enjoy doing the stuff myself rather than writing reports."

In 2004, he became commercial director at Trinity Mirror, owner of The Daily Mirror. Two years later, he was promoted to director of strategy and digital.

=== Google ===
Brittin joined Google in January 2007, becoming managing director of Google UK in 2009, taking over from Dennis Woodside. In September 2011, he became Google's vice-president for Northern and Central Europe. In December 2014, Google reorganised its structure in Europe and consolidated its European divisions under Brittin's management as president of EMEA Business and Operations. He apologised in 2017 over Google's ad placement next to illegal content.

Brittin stepped down from his position at Google in early 2025.

==== Public Accounts Committee ====
Brittin was first called before the UK Public Accounts Committee on 12 November 2012 to explain how Google had generated billions of pounds of profit from its UK operations but paid almost no corporation tax. On 16 May 2013 Margaret Hodge MP, the chair of the committee, accused Google's UK division (managed by Brittin) of being "calculated and unethical" over its use of highly contrived and artificial distinctions to avoid paying billions of pounds in corporation tax owed by its UK operations. Hodge said to Brittin: "We're not accusing you of being illegal; we are accusing you of being immoral."

Brittin was called repeatedly to the committee, and said that Google does not "sell" in the UK, even though UK staff are paid incentives to "encourage" potential customers to spend money with Google. Reports from former staff contradicted his statements. He did not clarify his definition of "selling", but he "... admitted 'sales' staff based in Britain are paid commission for reaching targets, further contradicting his statement. It was also revealed that Google often advertised UK-based 'sales' jobs."

In response, Brittin said to Management Today about the committee: "I think it's reasonable for companies to undergo scrutiny. And it's right for people to show up to answer questions. But they didn't let me get my answer out. The real numbers are exactly the reason people get angry. They misrepresent the way the tax system works. Companies pay tax on profits. Companies do not pay profits on sales. We went through a six-year HMRC audit. At the end of that, they said exactly what we should pay and we did. We are happy to pay our fair share which is determined by rules."

In 2015, the UK Government introduced a new law intended to penalise Google and other large multinational corporations' artificial tax avoidance.

On 11 February 2016, in response to the committee asking how much he earned, Brittin said he did not know how much he was paid, a response that was widely ridiculed. Google were not legally obliged to tell even their shareholders what his salary was. Brittin said that Google had "...wanted the international tax system reformed." This was met with robust criticism by Stewart Jackson who said: "You sort of pose as an enlightened helper to the public debate ... And that the wicked awful tax system across the world somehow just happened to Google, whereas actually you've made a choice to avoid tax and set up structures specifically so to do"

=== Other roles ===
Brittin sits on the boards of the Climate Group (since 2009) and Media Trust (since 2010), and is a non-executive director of Sainsbury's. He became a non-executive director of the Guardian Media Group in February 2025.

=== BBC ===
In March 2026, Brittin was named as the new director-general of the BBC, and he assumed the role on 18 May 2026.

== Personal life ==
Brittin married Katherine Betts in 1995 and has two sons (born in 1999 and 2001).

== Notes ==
Business positions
Preceded by	Managing Director of Google UK; 2009 – 2011	Succeeded by

Media offices
Preceded by Tim Davie	Director-General of the BBC; 2026–present	Incumbent
