= Rhodri Talfan Davies =

Welsh television executive

Deputy Director-General of the BBC
- Incumbent
- Assumed office 9 June 2026
- Preceded by: Anne Bulford

Director-General of the BBC
- Interim
- In office 3 April 2026 – 17 May 2026
- Preceded by: Tim Davie
- Succeeded by: Matt Brittin

Personal details
- Born: 9 February 1971 (age 55) Cardiff, Wales
- Parent: Geraint Talfan Davies (father)
- Relatives: Aneirin Talfan Davies (grandfather); Alun Talfan Davies (great-uncle)
- Education: Jesus College, Oxford (BA); Cardiff University

Rhodri Talfan Davies (born 9 February 1971) is a Welsh media executive, and the Deputy Director-General of the BBC. He joined the BBC board in February 2026 as an executive director, a position he held alongside being interim Director-General of the BBC from 3 April to 17 May 2026. He was the director of BBC Cymru Wales from 2011 to 2020. He is a former journalist and communications executive.

== Personal life and education ==
Davies was born in Cardiff in 1971 to Elizabeth Siân Vaughan Yorath and Geraint Talfan Davies, the chairman of Welsh National Opera and a former controller of BBC Cymru Wales. His grandfather Aneirin Talfan Davies (1909–1980) was a poet, broadcaster and literary critic.

Educated at Ysgol Gyfun Gymraeg Glantaf, Cardiff, and Royal Grammar School, Newcastle upon Tyne, Davies went on to study as an undergraduate at Jesus College, Oxford (BA Hons), and received a postgraduate diploma in journalism from Cardiff University.

== Career ==
Davies's career began with a short tenure as a sub-editor at the Western Mail in 1993. In the same year he joined the BBC as a news trainee, where he remained as a news reporter and producer until 1999.

Davies was head of regional programmes at BBC West in Bristol from 1999-2001, taking charge of BBC television, online and local radio services across the region. He left the BBC in 2001 to become director of TV at the newly launched Homechoice (now TalkTalk TV). In 2005 he was appointed head of TV marketing at the cable operator ntl.

In 2006 Davies returned to the BBC as head of strategy and communications. He was appointed director of BBC Cymru Wales in September 2011. In 2020, Davies led the opening of the BBC’s new broadcast centre at Central Square in Cardiff.

In December 2020 Davies was appointed as BBC Director of Nations, with responsibility for nations and local audiences in Scotland, Wales, England and Northern Ireland. In January 2026 he was announced as the BBC's Interim Director General, taking over from Tim Davie on 3 April 2026 until Matt Brittin took up the role in May 2026. On 9 June 2026, Davies was appointed Deputy Director-General of the BBC.

Media offices
Preceded by Anne Bulford	Deputy Director-General of the BBC; 2026 - present	Incumbent
Preceded by Tim Davie	Director-General of the BBC; Interim; 2026	Succeeded by Matt Brittin
