= Alex Mahon =

British businesswoman (born 1973)

Alex Mahon CBE
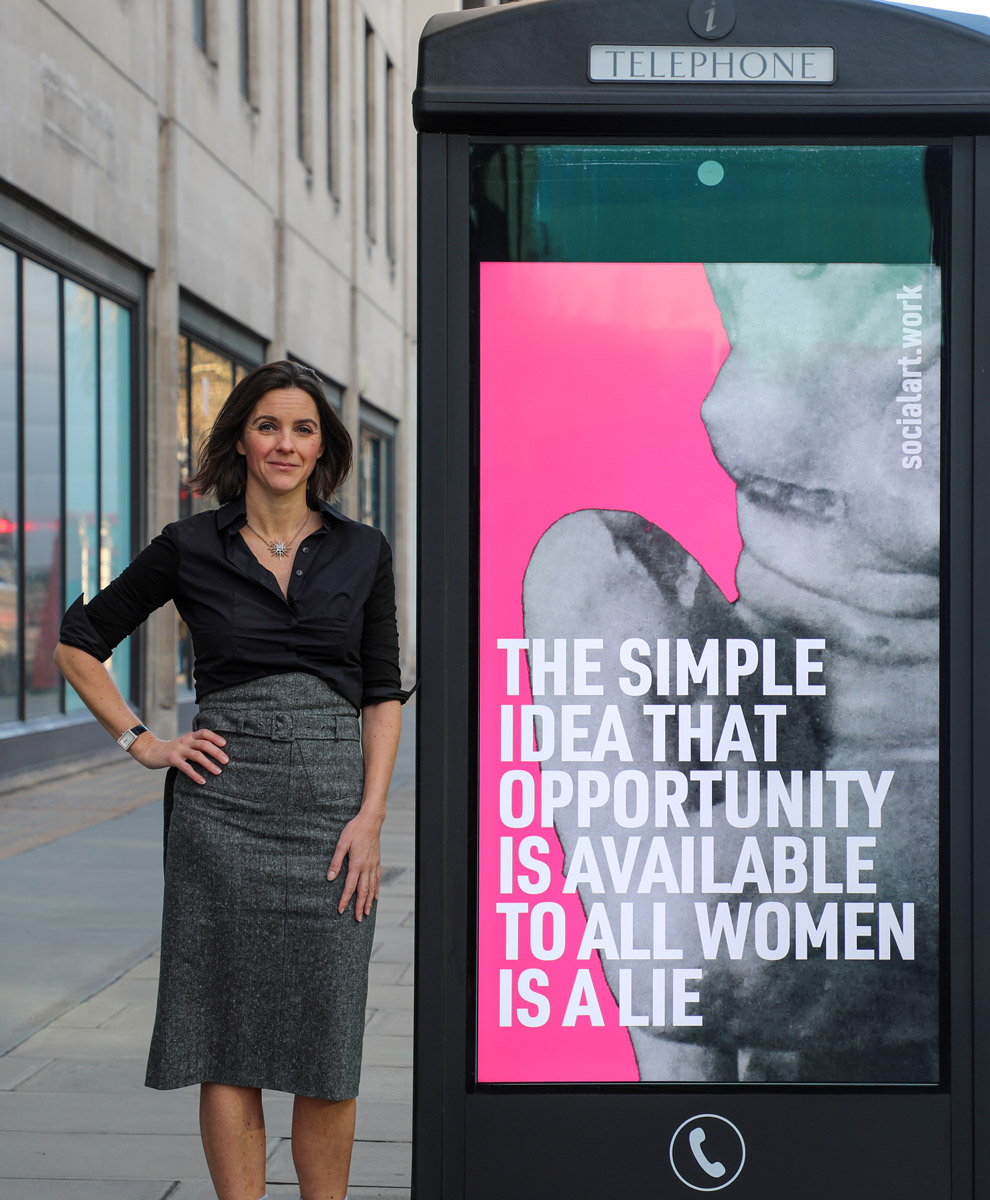
- Alex Mahon with public artwork by Martin Firrell
- Born: 29 October 1973 (age 52); London, England
- Education: St Margaret's School, Edinburgh; Imperial College London
- Occupation: Businesswoman
- Title: Former Chief Executive, Channel 4
- Predecessor: David Abraham
- Spouse: Richard Barker
- Children: 4

Alexandra Rose Mahon CBE (born 29 October 1973) is a British businesswoman. She was the chief executive of Channel 4 from October 2017, succeeding David Abraham as the first female CEO of the channel. Mahon left Channel 4 in June 2025.

== Early life and education ==
Alexandra Rose Mahon was born on 29 October 1973 in London. Aged five, she moved to Edinburgh, and grew up there with her mother and stepfather. She was educated at James Gillespie's High School and St Margaret's School, Edinburgh.

She has a PhD in medical physics from Imperial College London, awarded in 1998. She worked on a project at CERN.

== Career ==
Mahon began her career as a technology consultant with Mitchell Madison Group. In 2002, she joined Fremantle as director of commercial development.

In 2005, when working for Talkback Thames, Management Today included Mahon in their top 35 women under 35 in the business world.

Mahon was CEO of the production company Shine Group, owned by 21st Century Fox, and then CEO of the visual effects software company Foundry.

She has worked with the UK's Department of Culture, Media and Sport (DCMS), as a member of their advisory panel on the BBC's future direction.

Mahon's appointment as chief executive of Channel 4 was announced in June 2017 and became effective the following October. in her role, Mahon earns 'almost £1 million' annually.

On 28 April 2025, Mahon announced that she would be stepping down as chief executive of Channel 4, and was subsequently named as the new chief executive of Superstruct Entertainment.

== Personal life ==
Mahon is married to Richard Barker, who works in renewable energy; the couple have four children. The family live in Paddington, London.

Mahon was appointed a Commander of the Order of the British Empire (CBE) in the 2026 New Year Honours, for services to broadcasting and diversity.

Deadline has described Mahon as a former surf champion.

On 30 January 2025, speaking at a Royal Television Society event in London, Mahon presented a research study Gen Z: Trends, Truth and Trust, which examined 13 to 27 year olds. She said social media platforms had "publicly announced a wanton abandonment of the pursuit of truth" and called for joint industry action and new regulation to help young people find verified, independent news online. Her proposals included regulation to support public service media in shaping AI, with large language models trained on validated public service content, and transparency over what AI models are trained on. The research found that for 16 to 27 year olds, 64 per cent of video viewing was on social platforms and YouTube.
