= Anne Bulford =

British media executive

Anne Bulford CBE

Deputy Director-General of the BBC
- In office 6 July 2016 – 2019
- Preceded by: Mark Byford
- Succeeded by: Rhodri Talfan Davies

Personal details
- Born: 22 September 1959 (age 67) Wirral Peninsula, England
- Spouse: David Smith
- Education: University College London
- Occupation: Media executive

Anne Christine Bulford CBE (born 22 September 1959) is a British media executive who served as Deputy Director-General of the BBC.

== Early life ==
Bulford was born in Wirral, England. She graduated from University College London where she was a lay member of Council and Honorary Treasurer until July 2012. She is a trained chartered accountant.

== Career ==
=== KPMG and first period at the BBC ===
She worked for twelve years with KPMG. She left KPMG in 1993 to become Head of Internal Audit at the BBC. She was subsequently appointed Finance Director of Regional Broadcasting and then, following an internal reorganisation became the first Finance Director of BBC Production.

=== Return to the BBC ===
Bulford left the BBC in 1999 to join Carlton Communications. From 2002 to 2005, Bulford was Director of Finance & Business Affairs at the Royal Opera House, before being hired by Channel 4, becoming their Chief Operating Officer, following a period as interim Chief Executive.

Bulford re-joined the BBC as a member of their finance and operations team in June 2013. In June 2016 it was announced that she would take up the role of Deputy Director-General. The BBC announced her salary in September 2017 to be £435,000 per annum.

In January 2019, Bulford announced her plans to leave the BBC in the spring of that year, hoping to pursue a portfolio of non-executive roles. On her decision, Director-General Tony Hall said, "Anne has been an inspirational leader. She has brought real insight and determination in bringing change to the BBC."

== Recognition ==
Bulford was appointed Officer of the Order of the British Empire (OBE) for services to broadcasting in the 2012 Birthday Honours, and promoted to Commander of the Order of the British Empire (CBE) in the 2020 Birthday Honours for services to broadcasting and charity.

== Personal life ==
Bulford is currently a Trustee of the Motor Neurone Disease Association and also of the Conservatoire for Dance and Drama. She married David Smith on 11 May 1991 at Rowley, East Riding of Yorkshire. Her husband rang church bells at Market Weighton.
