= Aneirin Talfan Davies =

Welsh poet, broadcaster and critic (1909–1980)

Aneirin Talfan Davies OBE
- Born: 11 May 1909; Gorseinon, Wales
- Died: 14 July 1980 (aged 71)
- Occupations: Poet, broadcaster
- Children: Geraint Talfan Davies
- Relatives: Alun Talfan Davies (brother); Rhodri Talfan Davies (grandson)

Aneirin Talfan Davies (11 May 1909 – 14 July 1980) was a Welsh poet, broadcaster and literary critic.

Talfan Davies was brought up in Gorseinon. During the 1930s Davies worked in London as a pharmacist before returning to Wales and settling in Swansea. He was the brother of Sir Alun Talfan Davies QC, with whom he founded the publishing company, Llyfrau'r Dryw (later succeeded by Christopher Davies). Aneirin Talfan Davies, who was known by the bardic name of Aneurin ap Talfan, also founded the Welsh language periodicals, Heddiw (English: Today) and Barn (Opinion). He was Head of Programmes Wales at the BBC and produced broadcasts of early works by Dylan Thomas. Following Thomas's death, he wrote a critical study of Thomas as a religious poet. He also translated the poetry of Christina Rossetti into Welsh, and edited the letters of the artist and poet David Jones, whose influence can be discerned throughout his work.

He wrote an anonymous satire in the Western Mail (under the pen name of Theomemphus), to which he was a frequent contributor, following Bishop Glyn Simon's attack on the workings of the Electoral College of the Church in Wales (1961). He was a prominent Anglican, and Christian themes characterised much of his writing. He was a regular worshipper at Eglwys Dewi Sant in Cardiff and at Llandaff Cathedral.

His son, Geraint Talfan Davies was Controller of BBC Wales from 1990 to 2000, co-founder of Glas Cymru (a predecessor of the now Dŵr Cymru Welsh Water), co-founder of the Institute of Welsh Affairs, and Chairman of the Welsh National Opera.

== Works ==
- Eliot, Pwshcin, Poe (1948)
- Gwyr Llen (1949)
- Blodeugerdd o englynion (1950)
- Crwydro Sir Gar (1955)
- Englynion a Chywyddau (1958)
- Dylan: Druid of the Broken Body (1964)
- Bro Morgannwg (1972)
- Diannerch Erchwyn a Cherddi Eraill (1975)
