= BBC Store =

2015–2017 video on demand store

- Developer: BBC Worldwide
- Type: Video on Demand
- Launched: 5 November 2015; 10 years ago
- Discontinued: 1 November 2017; 8 years ago
- Platform: BBC iPlayer
- Status: Closed
- Website: Archived official website at the Wayback Machine (archive index)

BBC Store was a short-lived video on demand store that launched in the UK on 5 November 2015 and opened the BBC Archive to consumers, allowing them to buy episodes or series of a show and download them (using dedicated BBC Store apps). BBC Store was approved by the BBC Trust in 2014. It was initially hosted on a dedicated website, but was later integrated with BBC iPlayer. BBC Store was provided and funded through BBC Worldwide, a commercial subsidiary of the BBC. It closed on 1 November 2017.

Following the launch of BBC Store, the BBC's UK physical and online shop (BBC Shop) closed on 29 March 2016. However, the online shop in the US and Canada is still fully operating. In November 2017 Tony Hall said, "We made the decision to go into download-to-own when the market looked like [it would work],” said Hall. “It was an experiment. We got out of it quick." The BBC are now looking for a way to replicate a video on demand subscription service similar to Netflix, rather than a buy to own service.

== Content ==
The service offered around 6,000 hours of recent programmes and 4,000 hours of archive content; 3,000 hours were of older titles that were currently available commercially. The last 1,000 hours were to be editorially selected. The Executive hoped each year to release a further 500–1000 hours of archive programmes.

Certain programmes were available to buy straight after broadcast. The store did not affect BBC iPlayer's 30-day catch-up service and the iPlayer remained free for UK television licence payers. Both Store and iPlayer are available to UK residents only.

== Closure ==
On 20 May 2017 an article in The Telegraph claimed the BBC Store would be closing. Then, on 25 May 2017, the BBC announced that the BBC Store would be closing on 1 November that year. All customers will be entitled to a full refund of any money paid for programmes. Purchases were available to watch until 1 November.
