= Mark Byford =

British media executive

Director-General of the BBC
- Acting; January 2004 – June 2004
- Preceded by: Greg Dyke
- Succeeded by: Mark Thompson

Deputy Director-General of the BBC
- In office 1 January 2004 – 31 March 2011
- Succeeded by: Anne Bulford

Personal details
- Born: 13 June 1958 (age 68) Castleford, West Riding of Yorkshire, England
- Spouse: Hilary Bleiker
- Children: 5
- Parent: Lawrence Byford (father)
- Education: University of Leeds

Mark Julian Byford (born 13 June 1958) was Deputy Director-General of the BBC and head of BBC journalism from 2004 to 2011. He chaired the BBC Journalism Board and was a member of the BBC Executive Board for thirteen years.

His responsibilities also included BBC Sport, the nations and regions (BBC Scotland, Wales, Northern Ireland and English regions) and editorial policy. He led the BBC-wide coverage of the general elections in 2005 and 2010; the Beijing Olympic Games in 2008; and the BBC coverage of the Queen Mother's Funeral in 2002 and the Royal Wedding in 2011.

Byford established and chaired the BBC's Editorial Standards Board, which was responsible for promoting the BBC's standards in ethics and programme-making across the corporation. He also established and chaired the Complaints Management Board, which oversaw the handling of complaints across the BBC. In addition, he was the chair of the BBC Academy Board co-ordinating all its training and development. He was in overall charge of the BBC's planning for the London 2012 Olympic Games as chair of the London 2012 Steering Group.

== Early life ==
Mark Julian Byford was born on 13 June 1958 in Castleford, Yorkshire. He spent his early years living around the West Riding of Yorkshire, where his father, Sir Lawrence Byford, served as a policeman. Sir Lawrence went on to become Chief Constable of Lincolnshire, and later, Her Majesty's Chief Inspector of Constabulary. Mark was educated at Lincoln School, which later became Lincoln Christ's Hospital Comprehensive School.

He returned to West Yorkshire in 1976, studying law at the University of Leeds, where he was president of Devonshire Hall. He graduated in 1979, aged 20, and joined the BBC as a "temporary holiday relief assistant" working as a researcher over the summer holiday in his local (Look North) television newsroom in Leeds. After three months' vacation work, he joined the BBC full-time.

== Career with the BBC ==
In 1981, aged 22, he produced the Royal Television Society's Regional News Programme of the Year – a BBC Look North special on unemployment in the North of England.

The following year, in 1982, he produced the award-winning edition again – this time with South Today in Southampton. In 1987 he became head of news at BBC Bristol before becoming home editor BBC News and current affairs, responsible for all television network newsgathering coverage across the UK. There he led the BBC's coverage of the Clapham rail crash, the Kegworth M1 air crash, the Lockerbie bombing, the Hillsborough football tragedy, and the Marchioness riverboat disaster. In 1990 he returned to Leeds as head of centre. In 1991 he became controller of regional broadcasting.

He joined the BBC's board of management in 1996 as Director, Regional Broadcasting, responsible for the BBC's activities in the UK outside London. In 1997–98, he drew up the BBC's response to devolution and helped to devise and implement the policy to increase the level of network programming production outside London. In 1998 he became director of the BBC World Service and then head of the BBC's multi-media global news division in 2002.

In January 2004 he became Deputy Director-General of the BBC but within three weeks of his appointment, Greg Dyke resigned as Director-General, following the publication of the Hutton Report. Byford was appointed by the Board of Governors as Acting Director-General, a role that he undertook for five months. During this period, Byford had a lead role in producing Building Public Value, the BBC's Charter renewal manifesto.

When Mark Thompson was appointed Director-General of the BBC in June 2004, Byford's role was enlarged to take responsibility for all the BBC's journalism at UK, international and local levels – the first time such a post had been established. In July 2006 he also became responsible for BBC Sport.

In June 2008 the BBC's governing body, the BBC Trust, in a direct criticism of BBC News, instructed Byford and his editors to "improve the range, clarity and precision of its network coverage of the different UK nations and regions". The Trust said the BBC was "falling short of its own high standards" and, in part, failing to meet its core purpose of helping inform democracy. Three years later, Professor Anthony King, the author of the original report for the Trust, said there "had been enormous change in how the BBC reported the devolved nations. They make many fewer mistakes than they used to."

As chair of the BBC's Editorial Standards Board, Byford led the executive response to the faked competitions scandals that engulfed the BBC in 2007, including designing the special training programme Safeguarding Trust which more than 17,000 members of staff had to attend. In November 2008, he led the investigation into the Brand/Ross affair and produced the special report that was published subsequently by the BBC Trust.

He is a fellow of the Radio Academy. He was a first board member of the joint industry radio research body, RAJAR, in the early 1990s and was also a board member of BARB, the television audience research body. He was a trustee of the Children in Need charity from 1992 to 1996. In 1999, he established the BBC World Service Trust, the BBC's international development charity, which used media and communications to reduce poverty and promote education and human rights around the world.

In July 2010, it was revealed that Byford had flown on business to the World Cup in South Africa, business class at a cost of £4,878. This came against a background of further cuts in BBC News, for which Byford was responsible. On 12 October 2010 it was announced Byford was leaving the corporation after thirty-two years and the Deputy Director-General post closed as part of the BBC's cutbacks in senior management costs. He had accepted voluntary redundancy. He stood down from the Executive Board in March 2011 and left the corporation in June 2011. Byford left the Executive Board of the BBC at the end of March 2011, and his BBC employment ended in the early summer after he led the Royal Wedding coverage, reportedly with a redundancy/notice package of between £800,000 and £900,000.

On his retirement The Guardian commented: "If he has a public profile at all it is because Byford came to symbolise the apparent excesses of top executive pay at the corporation. There he was, grey man with a job for life, half a million pounds in salary and, because he had been at the BBC so long without ever leaving, an uncapped two-thirds final salary pension entitlement and no obvious market rate comparator to justify such riches. It was very easy to put the question, as even many lower ranking BBC staff did – who else would pay Mark Byford £500,000 and for what? – knowing there was no very good answer." However, the remainder of that article, written by media commentator Steve Hewlett, suggested that his presence might be missed greatly at the BBC. "He made things happen and by common consent brought a firm moral sense to everything he did, rising above his own particular interests." It went on to highlight how he was a stabilising influence on Director-General Mark Thompson. That opinion appeared highly prophetic in the light of the two major Newsnight scandals – concerning Jimmy Savile and Lord McAlpine respectively – which engulfed the BBC within 18 months of Byford's departure. Both of those incidents led to widespread adverse criticism of high level management of journalism within the BBC and were surrounded by suggestions that the Director-General of the day was not sufficiently informed about issues highly significant for the BBC's reputation.

The subsequent Pollard Review highlighted that several witnesses had said "they believe the Savile affair and, in particular, the BBC's poor handling of it after the investigation was halted, would not have happened if the role of Deputy Director-General occupied by Mark Byford had still been in existence."

Media commentators agreed with that view. Professor Stewart Purvis said: "He watched the DG's back and he watched the BBC's back. Margaret Thatcher once declared: "Every Prime Minister needs a Willie (Whitelaw). Now the chorus is growing that every DG needs a Mark B." Peter Preston described him as: "a news aware Deputy, a safety net, a mopper up of perilous trifles."

== Later career ==
After leaving the BBC, Byford became a writer of non-fiction. His first book, A Name On A Wall: Two Men, Two Wars, Two Destinies was published by Mainstream in 2013. It tells the contrasting stories of an American soldier, Larry Byford, killed in the Vietnam War in 1967 and his own father, Lawry Byford, who served alongside the Americans in the Second World War. Jan C. Scruggs, the President and Founder of the Vietnam Veterans Memorial, described it as "an amazing journey that unfolded as a mission. An extraordinary experience like nothing ever done before in America. It's important. It matters." Julian Pettifer wrote "This tale should be compulsory reading for MPs and military leaders and anyone else who might lead us into armed conflict. An absorbing and meticulously researched work."

His second book, The Annunciation: A Pilgrim's Quest, was published by Winchester University Press in April 2018. Inspired by an Annunciation painting by François Lemoyne in the National Gallery, on loan from Winchester College, he searches for the spiritual meaning of the biblical story through conversations with senior clerics, theologians and art historians, as well as looking at Annunciation images.

He was a lay canon and member of chapter at Winchester Cathedral from 2017 to 2024 (resigning 20 June 2024). He has been a governor of the University of Winchester since 2014; a trustee of the Winchester Hospice Fundraising Charity since 2018; and a trustee of Play to the Crowd, the charity that runs Winchester Theatre Royal and the Hat Fair, since 2018. He was made a vice president of the RNLI in 2019 in recognition of his outstanding contribution as a trustee from 2012 to 2019.

== Personal life ==
He is married to Hilary Bleiker, whom he met whilst at Leeds University where she studied English, and they have five adult children: two sons and three daughters. He was awarded an honorary Doctor of Law degree by the University of Leeds in 2008. He and his family live in Winchester. In 2006 he was awarded an honorary doctorate by the University of Winchester, and in 2010 an honorary doctorate by the University of Lincoln, the city where he spent his teenage years.

Media offices
Preceded by Sam Younger	Director, BBC World Service; 1998–2004	Succeeded by Nigel Chapman
Preceded by Greg Dyke	Acting Director-General of the BBC; 2004	Succeeded by Mark Thompson
