= Geraint Talfan Davies =

Welsh journalist and broadcaster

Geraint Talfan Davies OBE DL FRIBA FLSW
- Born: 30 December 1943 (age 82)
- Education: Jesus College, Oxford
- Spouse: Elizabeth Siân Vaughan Yorath
- Children: 3, including Rhodri
- Father: Aneirin Talfan Davies
- Relatives: Alun Talfan Davies (uncle)

Geraint Talfan Davies OBE DL FRIBA FLSW (born 30 December 1943) is a Welsh journalist and broadcaster, and a long-serving trustee and chairman of many Welsh civic, arts, media and cultural organisations.

== Personal life and education ==
Geraint Talfan Davies was born on 30 December 1943, the second of three children of Aneirin Talfan Davies (1909–1980), a Welsh broadcaster, literary critic and poet, and his wife Mary Anne née Evans (1912–1971), a teacher.

Educated at Bishop Gore Grammar School, Swansea and Cardiff High School for Boys, Davies went on to read modern history at Jesus College, Oxford, graduating in 1966.

In 1967, he married Elizabeth Siân Vaughan Yorath, with whom he has three sons, including Rhodri Talfan Davies, who became the director of BBC Cymru Wales.

== Career ==
Davies' career began in 1966 as a graduate trainee with the Western Mail newspaper in Cardiff, where he became its first Welsh Affairs Correspondent. In 1971 he moved to The Journal newspaper in Newcastle upon Tyne, relocating to The Times in London in 1973 where he worked for a year, before returning to the Western Mail in 1974 as assistant editor.

In 1978, Davies moved into broadcasting, as the head of news and current affairs with HTV Wales, becoming assistant controller of programmes in 1982.

He returned to Newcastle in 1987, as director of programmes for Tyne Tees Television. In July 1987 he co-founded the Institute of Welsh Affairs with Cardiff lawyer Keith James. 1990 saw his return to Cardiff, at the start of his ten-year stint as controller of BBC Wales, a position that included overall responsibility for the BBC's television and radio operations in Wales, and the BBC National Orchestra and Chorus of Wales. In 1992 he became chairman of the Institute of Welsh Affairs, a position he would hold until 2014. Davies retired from the BBC in 2000, at the age of 57. He was succeeded by Menna Richards. His son, Rhodri Talfan Davies, was appointed director of BBC Wales in 2011.

== Notable positions ==
Geraint Talfan Davies has been involved with various arts, media and educational organisations, including the Royal Welsh College of Music and Drama, the Wales International Film Festival, the Artes Mundi visual arts prize, University of Wales Institute, Cardiff, the Wales Millennium Centre and Welsh National Opera.

He chaired Welsh National Opera (WNO) for three years, before his appointment in 2003 to the chair of the Arts Council of Wales (ACW). His tenure at ACW was cut short in 2006 when, following the council's successful resistance to Welsh Government plans to take over responsibility for the main national arts organisations, the Culture Minister, Alun Pugh, did not renew his appointment for a second term. He was then re-elected to the chair of WNO. He was a trustee of the Media Standards Trust (2005–15) and is currently a trustee of the Shakespeare Schools Foundation.

In 2000 he was one of a group that formed Glas Cymru Cyf, with the aim of acquiring Welsh Water with a view to turning it into a not-for-profit company. He was a non-executive of Glas Cymru Cyf from 2000 to 2011. He has also been a member of the BT Wales Advisory Forum.

He is an Honorary Doctor of the University of Glamorgan, and an Honorary Fellow of Jesus College, Oxford, Cardiff Metropolitan University, Swansea University, Bangor University, and of the Royal Institute of British Architects.

Geraint is currently Chair of the Cyfarthfa Foundation, a charity championing the development of Cyfarthfa Castle and Park in Merthyr Tydfil into a cultural centre and visitor attraction of international quality and an engine of social renewal.

Davies has previously held numerous other positions:

- Co-founder and chairman, Institute of Welsh Affairs, 1992–2014
- Chair, Arts Council of Wales, 2003–2006
- Board Member, Wales Millennium Centre, 2000–2003 and 2006–2009
- Board Member, Artes Mundi international visual arts prize
- Trustee, Media Standards Trust, 2005–15
- Chair, Newydd Housing Association, now the Cadarn Housing Group (1975–1978)
- Chair, Cardiff Bay Arts Trust, 1997–2003
- Chair, Wales International Film Festival, 1998–2001
- Chair, Welsh National Opera, 2000–2003 and 2006–present
- Governor, Welsh College of Music and Drama, 1993–1997
- Member of Management Committee, Northern Sinfonia, 1989–1990
- Member, Prince of Wales Committee for the Welsh Environment, 1993–1996
- Member, Radio Authority, 2001–2004
- Trustee, Tenovus Cancer Appeal, 1984–1987
- Trustee, British Bone Marrow Donor Appeal, 1987–1995
- Chair, Wales for Europe, 2016-2020

He was appointed Officer of the Order of the British Empire (OBE) in the 2014 New Year Honours for services to culture, broadcasting, and charity. In 2021, he was elected a Fellow of the Learned Society of Wales.

== Publications ==
- Davies, Geraint Talfan (2008). At arm's length : recollections and reflections on the arts, media and a young democracy. Bridgend: Seren Books. ISBN 9781854114365.
- Davies, Geraint Talfan (2018) Unfinished Business: Journal of an Embattled European. Cardigan. Parthian Books. ISBN 9781912681075
