= Tony Hall, Baron Hall of Birkenhead =

British media and art executive (born 1951)

The Right Honourable The Lord Hall of Birkenhead CBE
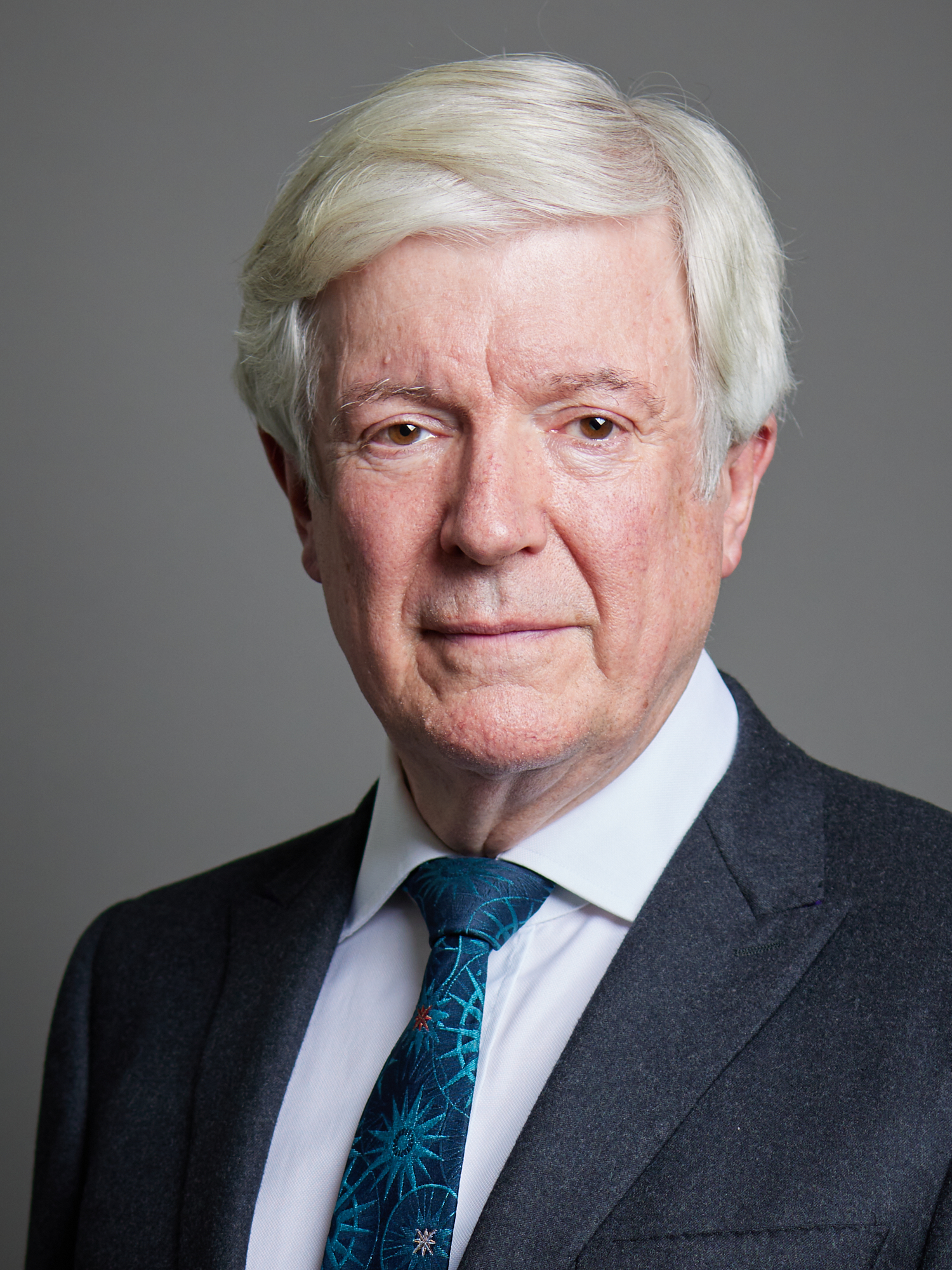
- Official portrait, 2021

16th Director-General of the BBC
- In office 2 April 2013 – 31 August 2020
- Deputy: Anne Bulford
- Preceded by: George Entwistle
- Succeeded by: Tim Davie

President of the European Broadcasting Union
- In office 1 January 2019 – 1 January 2021
- Deputy: Delphine Ernotte
- Preceded by: Jean-Paul Philippot
- Succeeded by: Delphine Ernotte

Member of the House of Lords
- Lord Temporal
- Life peerage 19 March 2010

Personal details
- Born: Anthony William Hall; 3 March 1951 (age 75) Birkenhead, Cheshire, (Note: Birkenhead was part of Cheshire in 1951 (it became part of Merseyside upon the county's creation in 1974)) England
- Spouse: Cynthia Davis (m. 1977)
- Children: 2
- Education: Keble College, Oxford
- Profession: Television journalist; media executive

Anthony William Hall, Baron Hall of Birkenhead (born 3 March 1951) is a British life peer. He was Director-General of the BBC between April 2013 and August 2020, and chaired the board of trustees of the National Gallery from September 2020 to May 2021.

Hall was Director of News at the BBC between 1993 and 2001, and Chief Executive of the Royal Opera House in Covent Garden, London from 2001 until March 2013. He was made a life peer and took his seat in the House of Lords as a crossbench member on 22 March 2010. He took up the post of Director-General of the BBC on 2 April 2013, and stepped down as Director-General on 31 August 2020, replaced by Tim Davie.

An inquiry in 2021 found that Hall, when Director of News at the BBC, had carried out an inadequate investigation into the methods used by Martin Bashir for the BBC's Panorama interview with Diana, Princess of Wales. He resigned as chairman of the National Gallery on 22 May 2021.

Since he left the BBC, Hall has joined the Board of the National Trust and was elected to the Communications and Digital Committee of the House of Lords.

In December 2023, the Woodland Trust, the UK's largest woodland conservation charity, announced the appointment of Hall as the charity’s new Chair. He took up the role in June 2024 when the then Chair, Barbara Young, Baroness Young of Old Scone, stepped down after eight years as Chair.

It was announced in July 2024 that Hall would succeed Sir Patrick Vallance as non-executive Chairman of the Board of Trustees of the Natural History Museum, having originally been appointed to the Natural History Museum Board of Trustees by the Prime Minister in November 2023 .

== Early life ==
Anthony William Hall, the son of a bank manager, was born in Birkenhead, Wirral, on 3 March 1951 to Donald William Hall and Mary Joyce Hall. He was educated at two direct grant schools (now independent), King Edward's School, Birmingham, and Birkenhead School, before going to Keble College, Oxford, where he read Philosophy, Politics and Economics, graduating with an MA degree.

== Career ==
=== BBC ===
After Oxford, Hall joined the BBC as a trainee in 1973, initially working at its Belfast newsroom. He later worked as producer on Today, The World at One, The World Tonight, and PM. He became editor of the Nine O'Clock News at the age of 34.

In 1987 he was appointed the Editor of News and Current Affairs, and was appointed Director of BBC News and Current Affairs in 1990, combining TV and radio for the first time. He continued to lead BBC News until 2001.

Among his career achievements are the launch of BBC Parliament, BBC Radio 5 Live, BBC News 24, and BBC News Online. In 1999 he applied unsuccessfully for the position of Director-General of the BBC, but was later successful, being appointed as BBC Director-General on 22 November 2012, and took office on 2 April 2013.

On 25 March 2015, Hall decided not to renew Top Gear presenter Jeremy Clarkson's BBC contract after an internal investigation found that Clarkson had assaulted the programme's producer. Hall and his wife received death threats which the BBC decided were "credible", and they were subsequently guarded by police. On 28 March, Scotland Yard confirmed that officers were investigating the threats.

Shortly before leaving the BBC on 31 August 2020, Hall commented that the 2015 negotiations with the government over TV licences for the over 75s - whereby the government ended subsidising the BBC for free TV licences - had been "tense". Hall struck the deal despite warning that the government's proposals would be a "nuclear" option that could lead to the loss of many BBC services. He said that he had thought about resigning over the issue, before deciding to stay and seek to ameliorate the changes. Hall agreed with the interviewer, Amol Rajan, that there was a need to improve "diversity of thought" at the BBC, and was hopeful of 50/50 equal pay parity during 2020.

On 20 January 2020, it was announced that Hall would leave his Director-General job in the summer, saying "If I followed my heart I would genuinely never want to leave." He spent seven years in the role. Hall said it was better for a new person to lead the corporation through its mid-term review in 2022 and BBC Charter renewal in 2027.

=== Royal Opera House ===
Hall was appointed Chief Executive of the Royal Opera House in April 2001. He set up ROH2, a department devoted to supporting new artists and developing new audiences, following which he set up new initiatives to widen access to the Royal Opera House – including big screen relays to locations across the UK: Paul Hamlyn matinées and other low-price ticket schemes.

In 2007, he oversaw the ROH's purchase of Opus Arte, a ballet and opera DVD/Blu-ray production and distribution company. As a Royal Opera House subsidiary, Opus Arte has relaunched its website as an online classical music retailer, selling both digital and physical products from across all the major record labels.

Between 2010 and 2011, Hall's salary increased from £165,000 to £205,000, making him the highest-paid Chief Executive of all UK charities. His emoluments for management of the Royal Opera House exceeded £390,000 per annum in the years ending 29 August 2010 and 2011 respectively.

=== National Gallery ===
Hall's appointment to become chair of the board of trustees of the National Gallery was announced in January 2020. He took up the position on 1 September 2020 after standing down from his position at the BBC. He resigned as National Gallery chairman on 22 May 2021 following an inquiry into BBC Panorama's Princess Diana interview.

=== External appointments ===
Hall was appointed inaugural chair of the industry-led Creative & Cultural Skills (Sector Skills Councils), a post he held between 2004 and 2009. Sector Skills Councils introduced the first formal creative apprenticeships; won government approval to build state-of-the-art facility The Backstage Centre for backstage skills located with the Royal Opera House's production park at High House Purfleet in Thurrock, Essex, and maintain a careers advice and guidance website called "Creative Choices".

He served as chair of the Music and Dance Scheme Advisory Board, and led a Dance Review for the Department for Education and Skills resulting in an additional £5 million input towards dance education. He was a member of the Management Committee of the Clore Leadership Programme until 2011. He sat on the Culture and Creative Advisory Forum panel for the Department for Culture, Media and Sport and was chair of the Theatre Royal Stratford East until 2009.

Hall has been a member of the Regeneration Through Heritage Steering Group, a board member for Race for Opportunity, a board member for Learndirect and Council member of Brunel University. Until May 2000 he was chair of the Royal Television Society. In April 2007, in the wake of the 2007 Iranian seizure of Royal Navy personnel, he was asked to lead an enquiry into the MOD's media strategy. Since 2008, he has served on the board of the British Council.

In July 2009, at the Mayor of London and HM Government's request, he set up and chaired a board directing the Cultural Olympiad, and also joined the London Organising Committee for the Olympic Games Board.

Hall has been a Trustee of the Paul Hamlyn Foundation since 2011, and was appointed Deputy Chairman of Channel 4 in 2012, a post he was obliged to relinquish upon becoming Director-General of the BBC.

On 29 June 2018, Hall was elected as the new President of the European Broadcasting Union (EBU).

After leaving the BBC in September 2020, it was announced that Hall would chair an independent company producing documentaries, HTYT Stories.

In January 2022, he was appointed to chair the board of Frontline, a charity whose aim is "helping to keep children free from harm and supporting them to achieve their full potential..".

In November 2023 he was appointed as the chairman of the board of the City of Birmingham Symphony Orchestra.

In May 2024 it was announced that he would lead a new body to promote tourism in the Liverpool City Region.

== Honours, awards and peerage ==
- Life peer as Baron Hall of Birkenhead, of Birkenhead, in the County of Cheshire (created 19 March 2010)
- CBE (2006)

In September 2009 Hall received an honorary doctorate of literature (Hon DLit) from Goldsmiths, University of London, and subsequently was elected an honorary fellow of Keble College, Oxford. The Chartered Management Institute awarded him the 2010 Gold Medal Award for outstanding achievement.

City University elected him an honorary visiting fellow of journalism in 2012, and he has been a liveryman of the Worshipful Company of Painter-Stainers since 1985. More recently, Hall received an honorary degree from Birmingham City University in January 2017 and an honorary doctorate from City University in January 2018.

== Bibliography ==
Hall has written:

- King Coal: Miners, Coal and Britain's Industrial Future (Penguin Books, 1981)
- Nuclear Politics: The History of Nuclear Power in Britain (Penguin Books, 1986).

== Personal life ==
In 1977, Hall married to Cynthia Lesley Hall (née Davis), who was formerly headmistress of the School of St Helen and St Katharine and then of Wycombe Abbey, both girls' schools, and president of the Girls' Schools Association. They have a son and a daughter.

== Notes ==
Media offices
| Preceded by George Entwistle | Director-General of the BBC; 2013–2020 | Succeeded by Tim Davie |
Orders of precedence in the United Kingdom
| Preceded by The Lord Sugar | Gentlemen; Baron Hall of Birkenhead | Followed by The Lord Kakkar |
