= George Entwistle =

Former BBC Director-General

15th Director-General of the BBC
- In office 17 September 2012 – 10 November 2012
- Preceded by: Mark Thompson
- Succeeded by: Tim Davie (acting)

Personal details
- Born: George Edward Entwistle; 8 July 1962 (age 64)
- Spouse: Jane Porter (m. 1992)
- Children: 2
- Education: University of Durham St Catherine's College, Oxford Worcester College, Oxford

George Edward Entwistle (born 8 July 1962) is a former broadcasting executive, who was Director-General of the BBC during 2012, succeeding Mark Thompson. After a career in magazine journalism, he joined BBC Television in 1989, becoming a producer with a primary focus on factual and political programmes. He rose to become the director of BBC Vision, and became the Director-General of the BBC on 17 September 2012.

Entwistle resigned as Director-General on 10 November 2012, following investigations into BBC management and conduct following revelations the broadcaster had known about sexual abuse by Jimmy Savile and controversy over a Newsnight report which falsely implicated Lord McAlpine in the North Wales child abuse scandal. His resignation after just 54 days in the role made him the shortest-serving Director-General in the history of the BBC.

== Early life ==
Entwistle was born on 8 July 1962, the son of Philip and Wendy Entwistle. He was educated at Silcoates School, an independent school for boys (now co-educational), in the village of Wrenthorpe, near Wakefield in West Yorkshire. He then went on to study at the University of Durham (University College) in the city of Durham in north-east England, from which he graduated with a Bachelor of Arts (Hons) in Philosophy and Politics, in 1983.

== Career ==
=== Publishing ===
From 1984 to 1989, Entwistle worked as a writer and editor at Haymarket Magazines. In particular, he worked as editor of New HiFi Sound, as well as reviewing classical music.

=== Broadcasting ===
In 1989, Entwistle joined the British Broadcasting Corporation (BBC) as a broadcast journalism trainee. From 1990 to 1992, he was an Assistant Producer on Panorama. In January 1993, he became one of the Producers of the BBC One Sunday politics show On The Record. Between 1994 and 1999, he held the positions of producer, assistant editor, and finally deputy editor at BBC Two's Newsnight. He became deputy editor of BBC One's Tomorrow's World in 1999. After two years in the science department of the BBC, he returned to Newsnight as the deputy editor. He was promoted to editor of Newsnight on 10 September 2001 and served in that position until 2004. During his tenure, the show won five Royal Television Society awards, including Best News Programme, and a Broadcast Award, and was nominated for the Best News Programme BAFTA.

=== Broadcasting executive ===
In 2004, Entwistle was appointed executive editor of Topical Arts on BBC Two and BBC Four. In November of that year, he launched The Culture Show on BBC Two. In late 2005, he was appointed Head of Television Current Affairs at the BBC. From May to December 2007, he was the Acting Controller of BBC Four in place of Janice Hadlow. In January 2008, he became the Controller of Knowledge Commissioning. He was responsible for commissioning 1600 hours of TV programmes across BBC One, Two, Three and Four each year, and was in overall control of the BBC's online factual and learning content. On 27 April 2011, he was appointed Director of BBC Vision. In the role he was responsible for the television channels BBC One, BBC Two, BBC Three, BBC Four, BBC One HD and BBC HD, and the feature film-making arm of the BBC, BBC Films.

=== Director-General of the BBC ===
On 4 July 2012, the Chairman of the BBC Trust, Lord Patten, announced that Entwistle had been appointed to succeed Mark Thompson as Director-General of the BBC. He took up the post on 17 September 2012. Entwistle described himself as the "right person for the job".

Following Entwistle's departure Greg Dyke, a previous Director-General who had himself been persuaded to resign under controversial circumstances, offered his insights on the Entwistle affair:

"...you have to go back six years to when Tessa Jowell .... lumbered the BBC with a new governance system that everyone told her wouldn’t work."

When Lord Patten was appointed five years later,

"...it was clear, to me at least, that he was working out how he could be an all-powerful BBC chairman. First, he announced publicly that the successful and experienced existing director-general, Mark Thompson, would be leaving sooner than planned. Then he manoeuvred into Thompson’s place George Entwistle, someone with limited managerial experience and no experience of dealing with a crisis."

To compensate for Entwistle's shortcomings Patten,

"...would guide and help his inexperienced protégé. As it turned out, Patten wasn’t exactly standing alongside George on the barricades when it all went wrong. And, as a result, young Entwistle was hung out to dry, his career effectively destroyed..... He wasn’t given the support from above that he needed and deserved."

Only a matter of weeks into Entwistle's tenure as Director-General, the BBC became embroiled in the Jimmy Savile sexual abuse scandal. On 23 October 2012, Entwistle faced the Culture, Media and Sport Select Committee over questions the BBC had failed to broadcast a Newsnight investigation into historic sexual abuse by Savile after the presenter's death in 2011. Entwistle was accused by Lisa O'Carroll of The Guardian of giving a "less than authoritative performance, showing a lack of curiosity about Newsnight's investigation" and "leaving the impression of a director general not entirely in command of his operation."

Entwistle resigned as BBC Director-General on 10 November 2012, following controversy over a Newsnight report which indirectly and incorrectly implicated Lord McAlpine in the North Wales child abuse scandal. A particularly devastating interview with Entwistle by John Humphrys on that morning's BBC Radio 4 Today programme was possibly the immediate factor in his resignation, as it appeared from the interview that he had no intention of resigning when Humphrys put the issue to him. Entwistle said that Newsnight had been wrong to broadcast the report, and that he had been aware of it only after it had been broadcast. He commented "In the light of the unacceptable journalistic standards of the Newsnight film broadcast on Friday 2 November, I have decided that the honourable thing to do is to step down from the post of director general."

Entwistle was publicly supported by Jeremy Paxman, Michael Crick, John Ware, Stephen Fry and Ben Bradshaw.

== Personal life ==
In 1992, he married Jane Porter. They have a son and daughter. In 2013, Entwistle enrolled as a master's student at St Catherine's College, Oxford, and graduated in 2015 with a degree in history of design. He graduated from Worcester College, Oxford in 2022 with a DPhil in History.

Media offices
Preceded by Mark Thompson	Director-General of the BBC; 2012	Succeeded by Tim Davie; Acting
Preceded by Jana Bennett	Director: BBC Vision; 2011–2012	Succeeded by Emma Swain
Preceded by Janice Hadlow	Acting Controller: BBC Four; 2007–2007	Succeeded by Janice Hadlow
Preceded by Siân Kevill	Editor: Newsnight; 2001–2004	Succeeded by Peter Barron
