= BBC Motion Gallery =

Footage licensing division of BBC Studios

- Legal status: Division of BBC Studios
- Purpose: Film archive or repository of almost 70 years of BBC footage
- Location: BBC Studios Ltd, Television Centre, 101 Wood Lane, London
- Region served: Global, with offices worldwide
- Head of Motion Gallery: Chris Hulse
- Parent organization: BBC Studios
- Affiliations: BBC,
- Website: BBC Motion Gallery

BBC Motion Gallery is the footage licensing division of BBC Studios. It offers creative professionals access to a collection of stock footage with licensing worldwide.

== History ==
The organization originated in London as BBC Library Sales, a division of BBC Worldwide, in 1961. It opened an office in New York in 1993, and in 1994 opened offices in Toronto and Los Angeles. BBC Motion Gallery with 2004 has since opened additional offices in Hong Kong, Sydney, Mumbai, Tokyo and Paris. In January 2014 began a strategic partnership with Getty Images.

== Functions ==
BBC Motion Gallery footage encompasses subjects including natural history, sport, news, locations, art, music, celebrities and historic events. Clips from the archive have appeared in several films, usually of a historical nature.

Users are able to access over 125,000 BBC Motion Gallery clips online, or enlist a team of professional researchers to tap into the repository of content stored offline.

In addition to the BBC archive of rights-managed footage, BBC Motion Gallery offers a wide range of high-quality, royalty-free motion clips.

== Website ==
The BBC Motion Gallery collection includes over 125,000 creative, editorial and archival clips, along with millions of hours of offline content. The premium content spans a wide range of subjects including news, sport, natural history, wildlife, locations, celebrities, history, culture, science and stock. Online clips are available to download in broadcast quality from the website 24/7, while rare and unique offline content can be accessed using the online BBC Broadcast Archive research tool or with assistance from the experienced team.

== Representations ==
BBC Motion Gallery is the exclusive global representative of the Scottish Professional Football League.

== Short programmes ==
In addition to footage licensing, BBC Motion Gallery produces and distributes short-form programmes for broadcast on television and across all new media platforms.

== BBC Archive ==
The BBC Archive is a searchable, online database which catalogues over a million hours of BBC content dating back 60 years. BBC Archive includes detailed text descriptions of news items, television programmes and rare clips.

Users can access BBC Archive via http://www.gettyimages.co.uk/footage/bbcmotiongallery. All content is stored as text entries.

== BBC Studios ==
BBC Studios is the main commercial arm and a wholly owned subsidiary of the British Broadcasting Corporation (BBC). The company exists to maximize the value of the BBC's assets for the benefit of the licence payer and invest in public service programming in return for rights. The company has seven core businesses: Channels, TV Sales, Magazines, Content & Production, Home Entertainment, Global Brands and Digital Media.

== See also ==
- BFI National Archive
