= Mark Thompson (media executive) =

British–American media executive (born 1957)

Sir Mark Thompson
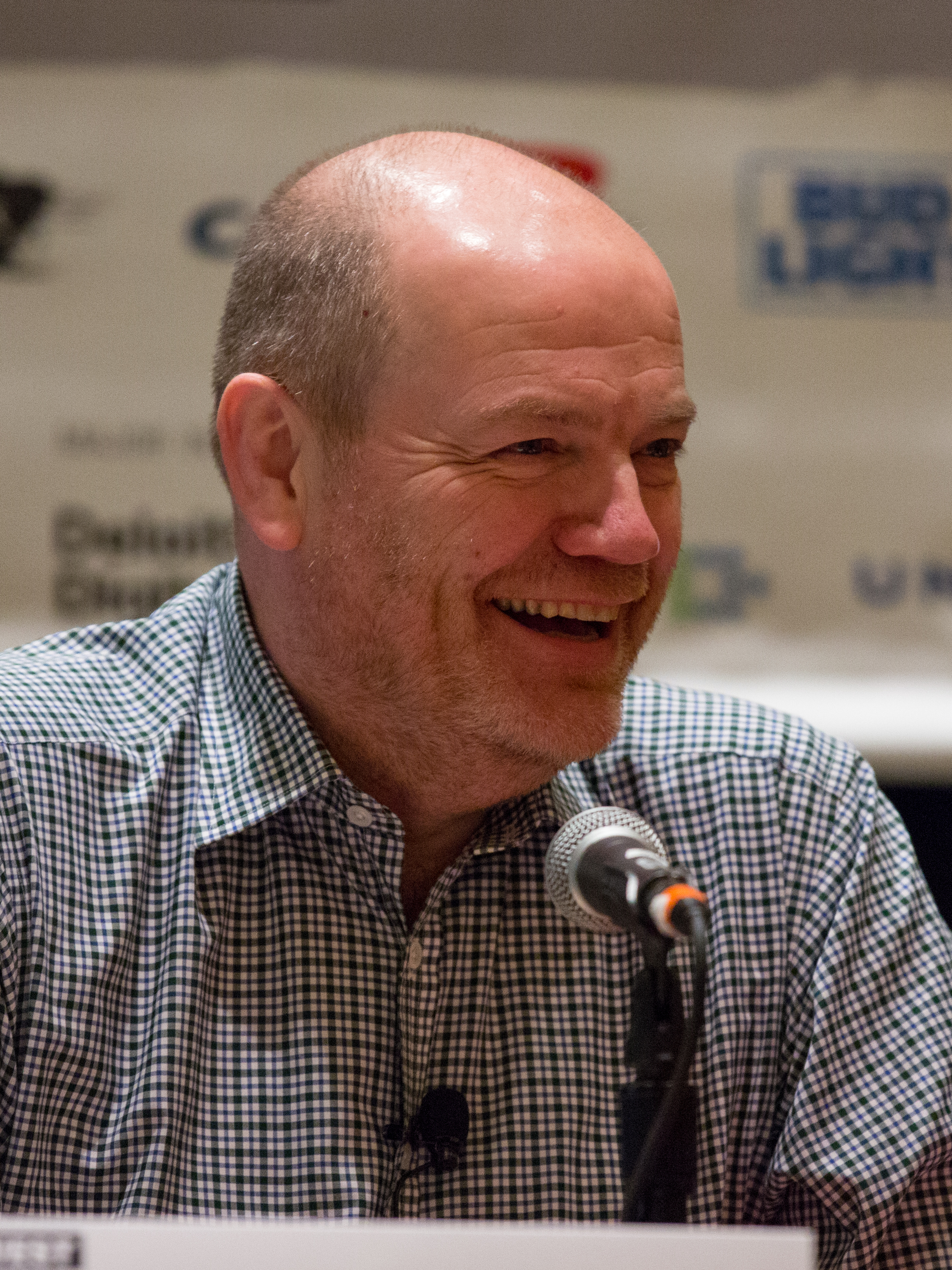
- Thompson in 2016

Chairman and CEO of CNN
- Incumbent
- Assumed office 9 October 2023
- Preceded by: Chris Licht

14th Director-General of the BBC
- In office 22 June 2004 – 17 September 2012
- Deputy: Mark Byford
- Preceded by: Mark Byford (acting)
- Succeeded by: George Entwistle

Personal details
- Born: Mark John Thompson; 31 July 1957 (age 69) London, England, UK
- Spouse: Jane Blumberg (m. 1987)
- Children: 3
- Education: Merton College, Oxford (BA)

Sir Mark John Thompson (born 31 July 1957) is a British–American media executive who is CEO of CNN, and serves as chairman of the Board of Directors of Ancestry. He is the former president and CEO of The New York Times Company. From 2004 to 2012, he was Director-General of the BBC, and before that was the Chief Executive of Channel 4.

In 2009 Thompson was ranked as the 65th most powerful person in the world by Forbes magazine. He was elected to the American Philosophical Society in 2017.

== Early life ==
Mark John Thompson was born on 31 July 1957 in London, England, and brought up in Welwyn Garden City, Hertfordshire, by his parents, Sydney Columba (née Corduff) and Duncan John Thompson. Sydney was Irish, the daughter of a County Donegal policeman. Mark Thompson has a sister, Katherine. Duncan Thompson was an accountant from Preston who died when Mark was twelve after suffering from chronic illness and depression.

Thompson was educated at Stonyhurst College in Lancashire, and then went to Merton College, Oxford. He edited the university magazine, Isis.

== Director-General of the BBC ==
=== Appointment ===
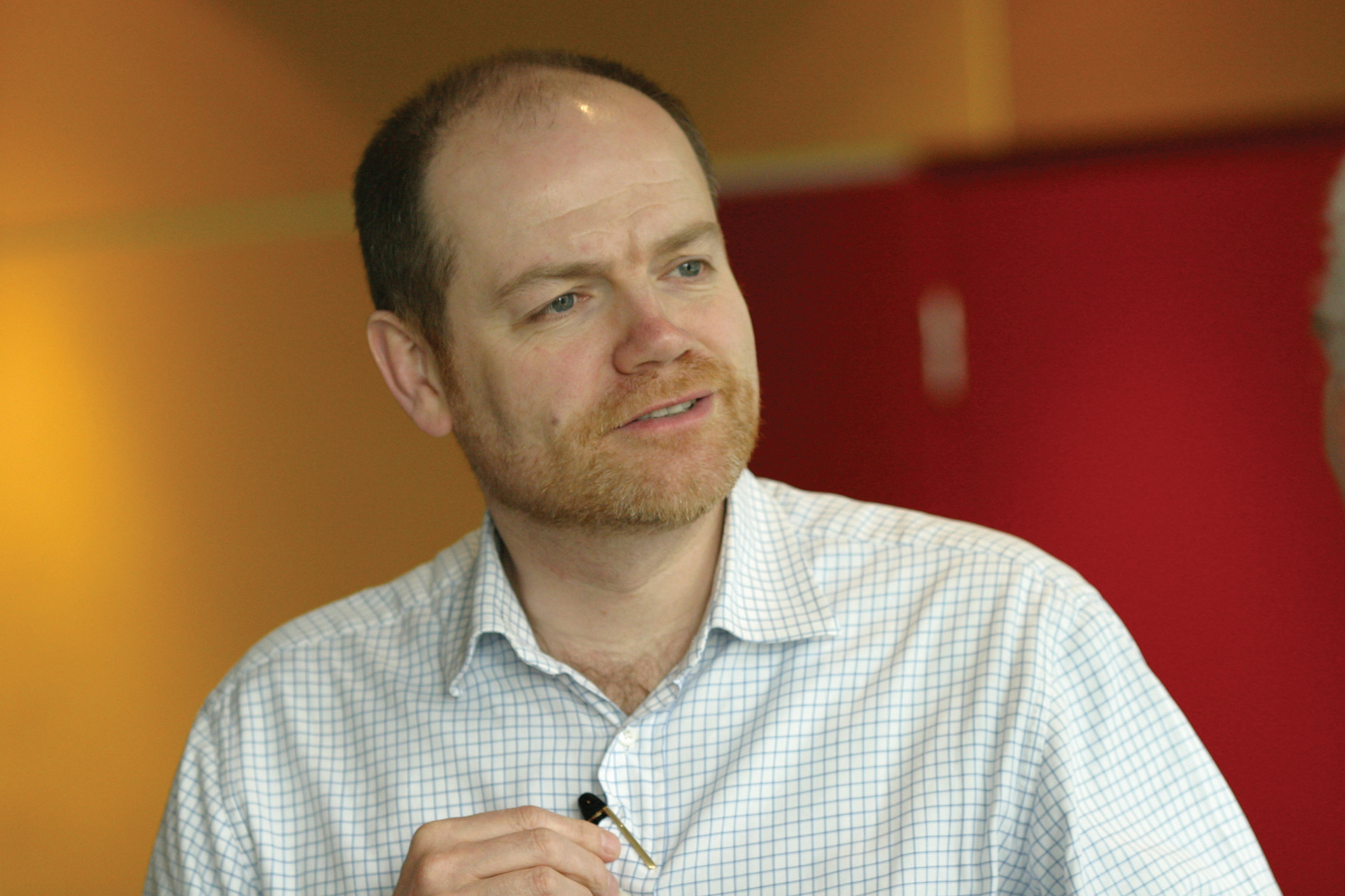
Thompson in April 2005

Thompson was appointed Director-General of the BBC on 21 May 2004. He succeeded Greg Dyke, who resigned on 29 January 2004 in the aftermath of the Hutton Inquiry. Although he had originally stated he was not interested in the role of Director-General and would turn down any approach from the BBC, he changed his mind, saying the job was a "one-of-a-kind opportunity". The decision to appoint Thompson Director-General was made unanimously by the BBC Board of Governors, headed by the then new Chairman Michael Grade (another former chief executive of Channel 4). His appointment was widely praised: Culture Secretary Tessa Jowell, Shadow Culture Secretary Julie Kirkbride and Dyke were amongst those who supported his selection. He took up the role of Director-General on 22 June 2004 (Mark Byford had been Acting Director-General since Dyke's resignation). On his first day he announced several management changes, including the replacement of the BBC's sixteen-person executive committee with a slimmed-down executive board of nine top managers.

=== Editorial guideline breaches ===
In 2007 it emerged that the BBC had been involved in a number of editorial guideline breaches: competitions on BBC shows had used fake winners who were either members of the production team or fictitious. In addition, a sequence of clips featuring the Queen and photographer Annie Leibovitz were shown out of order in a trailer for a documentary, giving the impression the Queen stormed off in a huff about her outfit after a conversation with Leibovitz.

Thompson, as BBC editor-in-chief, investigated the breaches, and presented his interim report to the BBC Trust on 18 July 2007. The Trust felt that the BBC's values of accuracy and honesty had been compromised, and Thompson outlined to the Trust the actions he would take to restore confidence.

Later that day he told BBC staff, via an internal televised message, that deception of the public was never acceptable. He said that he, himself, had never deceived the public – it would never have occurred to him to do so, and that he was sure that the same applied to the "overwhelming majority" of BBC staff. He also spoke on BBC News 24 and was interviewed by Gavin Esler for Newsnight. He stated that "from now on, if it [deceiving the public] happens we will show people the door." Staff were emailed on 19 July 2007 and later in the year all staff, including the Director-General, undertook a Safeguarding Trust course.

=== The Russell Brand Show prank telephone calls row ===
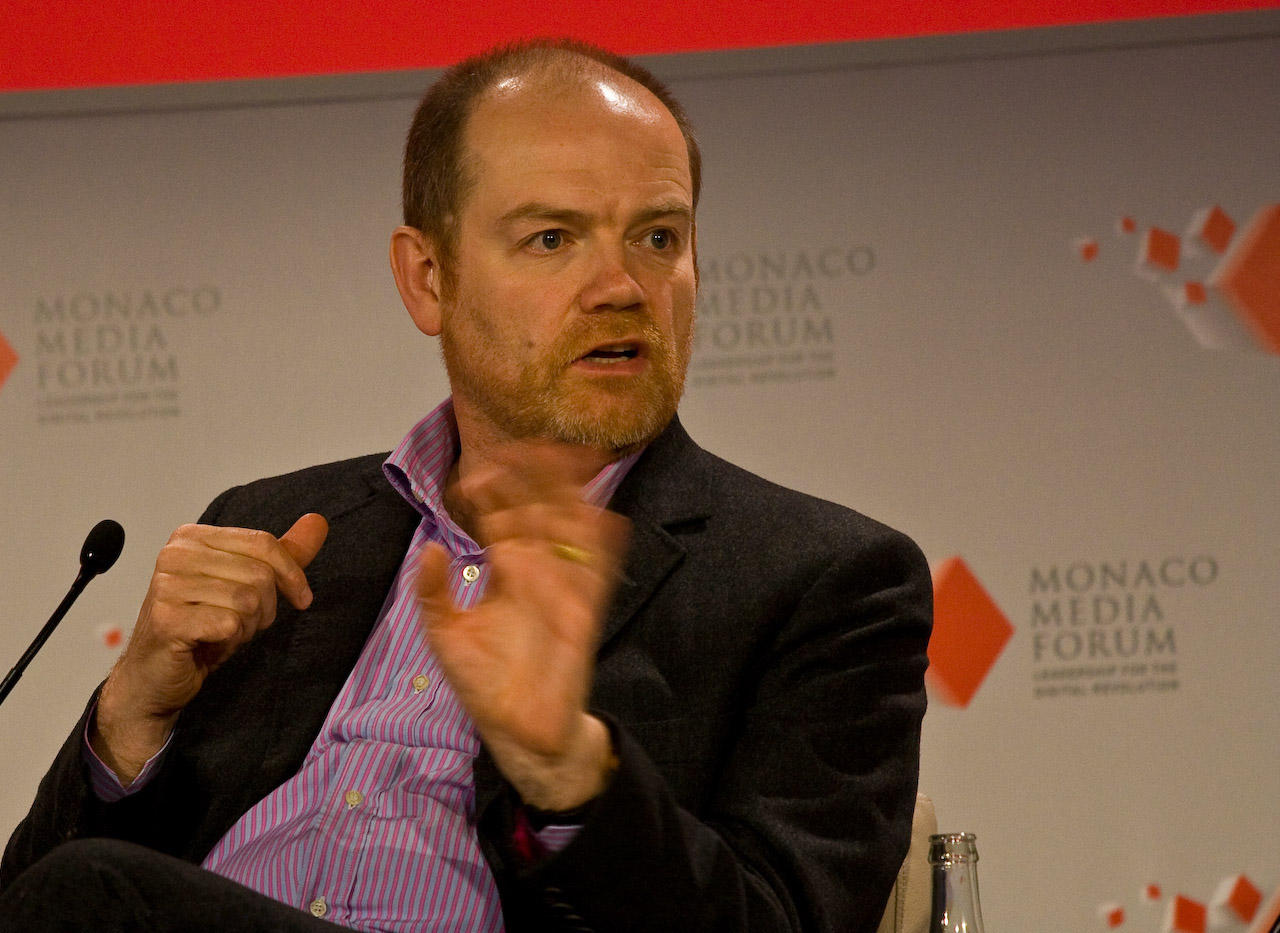
Thompson in November 2008

In October 2008, Thompson had to cut short a family holiday to return to Britain to deal with the arrival of The Russell Brand Show prank telephone calls row. Thompson took the executive decision to suspend the BBC's highest paid presenter, Jonathan Ross, from all his BBC work for three months without pay. He also said it was the controversial star's last warning. Thompson reiterated the BBC's commitment to Ross' style of "edgy comedy", arguing that "BBC audiences accept that, in comedy, performers attempt to push the line of taste". Thompson had previously defended the star's conduct and salary in 2006, when he described Ross as "outstanding" and said that "the very best people" deserved appropriately high salaries.

=== Comments on political bias ===
In September 2010, Thompson asserted that the BBC was previously biased against the Conservative Party, which he said he had witnessed early in his career. He stated: "In the BBC I joined 30 years ago there was, in much of current affairs, in terms of people's personal politics, which were quite vocal, a massive bias to the left". He added: "the organisation did struggle then with impartiality".

Roger Bolton, the former presenter of Feedback pushed back against the claim which was reported by the Guardian in 2010: "Perhaps he believes my fellow programme editors of that time like Chris Capron, George Carey, Ron Neil, Peter Ibbotson and Hugh Williams were lefties?" Bolton added. "In which case he must be possessed of remarkable insight since even today I don't know what their political leanings were or are," said Bolton in a letter to the BBC's in-house magazine, Ariel.

=== Jerry Springer: The Opera blasphemy allegations ===
Thompson was criticised by religious groups in relation to the broadcast of Jerry Springer: The Opera, with a private prosecution brought against the BBC for blasphemy. Lord Pannick QC appeared and won the case. The High Court ruled that the cult musical was not blasphemous, and Pannick stated that Judge Tubbs had "acted within her powers and made the only decision she could lawfully have made; while religious beliefs were integral to British society, so is freedom of expression, especially to matters of social and moral importance."

=== Accusations of pro-Israeli editorial stance ===
A number of commentators have suggested that Thompson has a pro-Israeli editorial stance, particularly since he supported the controversial decision by the BBC not to broadcast the DEC Gaza appeal in January 2009. Complaints to the BBC about the decision, numbering nearly 16,000, were directed to a statement by Thompson. In May 2011, Thompson ordered the lyrics 'free Palestine' in a rap on BBC Radio 1Xtra to be censored. During a meeting of the British Parliament's Culture and Media Committee in June 2012, Thompson also issued an apology for not devoting more coverage to the murders of an Israeli settler family in the West Bank, saying the "network got it wrong" – despite the fact that the incident occurred on the same day as the 2011 Tōhoku earthquake and tsunami.

Left wing activist Scottish actor Tam Dean Burn wrote to The Herald: "I would argue that this bias has moved on apace since Thompson went to Israel in 2005 and signed a deal with prime minister Ariel Sharon on the BBC's coverage of the conflict."

=== Nick Griffin Question Time appearance ===
In October 2009, Thompson defended the decision by the BBC to invite British National Party leader Nick Griffin to appear on the Question Time programme following criticism by Labour politicians including Home Secretary Alan Johnson and Secretary of State for Wales Peter Hain. The decision also led to protests outside BBC Television Centre by UAF campaigners. Thompson said:

It is a straightforward matter of fact that... the BNP has demonstrated a level of support which would normally lead to an occasional invitation to join the panel on Question Time. It is for that reason alone... that the invitation has been extended. The case against inviting the BNP to appear on Question Time is a case for censorship... Democratic societies sometimes do decide that some parties and organisations are beyond the pale. As a result, they proscribe them and/or ban them from the airwaves. My point is simply that the drastic steps of proscription and censorship can only be taken by government and parliament... It is unreasonable and inconsistent to take the position that a party like the BNP is acceptable enough for the public to vote for, but not acceptable enough to appear on democratic platforms like Question Time. If there is a case for censorship, it should be debated and decided in parliament. Political censorship cannot be outsourced to the BBC or anyone else.

=== Earning controversy ===
In 2010, Thompson was identified as the highest paid employee of any public sector organisation in the UK, earning between £800,000 and £900,000 per year. In January 2010, Thompson was criticised over his apparent £834,000 salary by BBC presenter Stephen Sackur, who told him "there are huge numbers of people in the organisation who think your salary is plain wrong and corrosive."

=== Formula One broadcast rights ===
Thompson was Director-General of the BBC when on 29 July 2011 it was announced that the corporation would no longer televise all Formula One Grand Prix live, instead agreeing to split the broadcast between the BBC and Sky Sports. This prompted an outcry from several thousand fans and a motion on the UK Government e-petition site. On 2 September 2011, Thompson and several "senior BBC figures" were called upon by the House of Commons to answer questions over the exact nature of the broadcast arrangement.

=== Jimmy Savile controversy ===
Although Thompson departed the BBC before public exposure of the Jimmy Savile sexual abuse scandal and is not noted in the BBC chronology of the unfolding coverage, Thompson faced questions about his role in the events around Savile's actions and BBC coverage of them. According to a New York Times review, Thompson denied knowing of a BBC Newsnight programme on accusations against Savile before it was became public knowledge soon after Savile's death in October 2011.

=== Praise and criticism of his BBC leadership ===
Thompson left the BBC in September 2012 after eight years as Director-General. The Independent said the BBC was in "apparent great shape" with his departure and the BBC Trust's chairman, Chris Patten, described his directorship as "outstanding".

In late 2007, Richard Eyre, former artistic director of the National Theatre, accused the BBC under Thompson's leadership of failing to produce programmes "that inspired viewers to visit galleries, museums or theatres". Tony Palmer, a multi-award-winning filmmaker, stated that the BBC "has a worldwide reputation which it has abrogated and that's shameful". He concluded, "In the end, the buck stops with Mark Thompson. He is a catastrophe." In May 2008, fertility expert and BBC presenter Robert Winston accused Thompson's leadership of showing "cowardice", and following Thompson's departure he accused the corporation of "dumbing down" its science programming and "pursuing viewing figures" rather than producing quality programmes.

== President and CEO of The New York Times Company ==
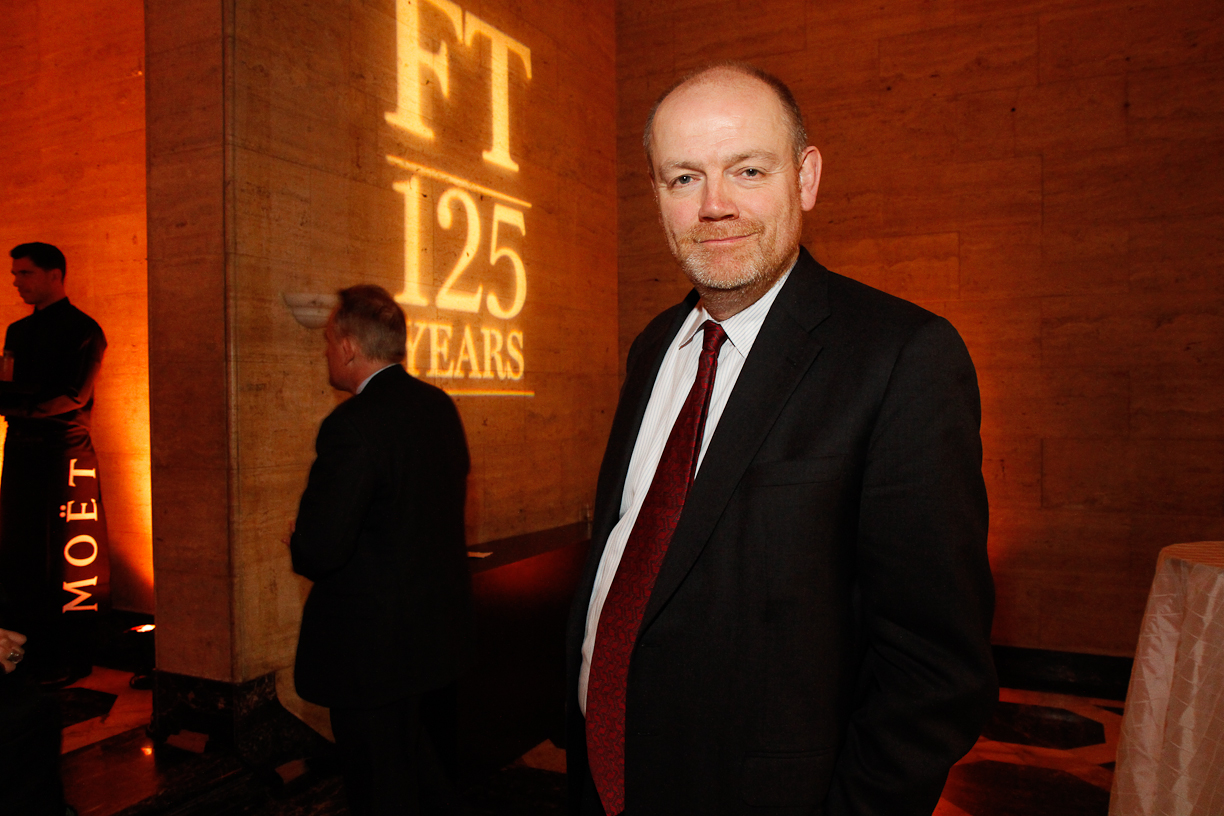
Thompson in 2013

On 14 August 2012, Thompson was named CEO of The New York Times Company, effective 12 November 2012. He was brought on to accelerate the company's digital transition and extend its global reach, and in this role he directs strategy and oversees business operations. Thompson invested heavily in the Times' digital products, and has attributed increased autonomy for the digital product teams as "the single biggest reason" for the news outlet's success.

In 2013, he hired Meredith Kopit Levien as chief revenue officer and promoted her to chief operating officer in 2017. Thompson has been critical of Google and Facebook. He has said the Times seeks to be a destination and not reliant on the platforms, and hopes to "more reliably turn engagement into a regular revenue stream". In 2018, he gave a speech at the Open Markets Institute in Washington, D.C., in which he described Facebook's policy of labelling political news as ads as "a threat to democracy". According to a filing with the Securities and Exchange Commission, Thompson's total compensation in 2019 was $6.1 million, including salary and stock awards.

In 2015, he pledged to transform the Times into an "international institution", the same way "we once successfully turned a metro paper into a national one". The Times now has more international digital subscribers than it had total digital subscribers when Thompson took over as CEO. Under Thompson's leadership, The New York Times became the first news organization in the world to pass the one million digital-only subscription mark. As of May 2020, the company surpassed 5 million digital-only subscriptions, and 6 million total subscriptions, accounting for nearly sixty per cent of the company's revenue. In 2015, Thompson set the goal of doubling the company's digital revenue by 2020. The goal was met ahead of schedule in 2019. The company's new goal is to have 10 million subscriptions by 2025. He has also predicted that the print paper will last for at least 15 more years.

In July 2020, he was replaced by Meredith Kopit Levien as CEO and president of the New York Times Company.

== Chairman of Ancestry ==
In January 2021, Thompson was appointed as Chairman of the Board of Directors of Ancestry.

== CEO of CNN ==
On 30 August 2023, Thompson was named the CEO of CNN, replacing Chris Licht, who was fired in June. He officially started on 9 October 2023. Writing of the appointment in a note to staff, Warner Bros. Discovery CEO David Zaslav shared, "I am confident he is exactly the leader we need to take the helm of CNN at this pivotal time."

=== Criticism of coverage of the Israel-Gaza War ===
In a 4 February 2024 investigation by The Guardian, some CNN staff blamed their channel's newly appointed director Mark Thompson for what they described as biased reporting of the Gaza war. The staff criticized their network's coverage of the war, charging that it had promoted Israeli propaganda, and gave more attention to Israeli suffering, and the Israeli narrative of the war. One staffer claimed that this bias was systematic and institutionalized, as many journalists' stories were forced to be cleared by channel's Jerusalem bureau before publication. Staffers claimed that statements by Hamas and the Palestinian Authority were rarely reported on, while Israeli statements were taken at face value. A CNN spokesperson denied the charges of bias.

== Enough Said ==
In 2016, Thompson published Enough Said: What's Gone Wrong with the Language of Politics? in which he condemns political discourse that is "just a fight to the political death, a fight in which every linguistic weapon is fair game" and is critical of the rejection of science and expertise, writing that this has disastrous policymaking consequences. Thompson also criticised false balance in news reporting. The book was favourably reviewed by Andrew Rawnsley, who called it an "important study" that "identifies many culprits for the destructiveness of political debate." John Lloyd, writing in the Financial Times, praised the work as reflective and an "intricately but also urgently argued book." The Washington Post said the book shows that Thompson "believes devoutly in the importance ... of intelligent and productive public discussion".

== Personal life ==
Thompson is a Catholic, and was educated at the English Jesuit public school, Stonyhurst College, from 1970 to 1975. In 2010, The Tablet named him as one of Britain's most influential Catholics. Thompson lives in the United States with his wife, Jane Emilie Blumberg (daughter of Baruch Samuel Blumberg), whom he married in 1987. They have two sons and one daughter.

He is a member of the Reform Club and a patron of the Art Room charity in Oxford. In 2002, he joined the board of trustees of Media Trust, the UK's leading communications charity.

Thompson has been on the board of directors for The New York Times Company and the Royal Shakespeare Company.

In September 2021, it was announced that Thompson would co-chair, with Filipino journalist and editor Maria Ressa, the International Fund for Public Interest Media.

In 2011, Thompson was awarded an Honorary Doctorate by Edge Hill University, and 2015, he was awarded an Honorary Doctor of Letters from Sacred Heart University.

In 2012, Thompson was the first Humanitas Visiting Professor in Rhetoric and the Art of Public Persuasion at the University of Oxford.

Thompson was knighted in the 2023 Birthday Honours for services to media.

== See also ==
- New Yorkers in journalism

Media offices
Preceded by Michael Jackson	Controller of BBC Two; 1996–1999	Succeeded by Jane Root
Preceded by Michael Jackson	Chief Executive of Channel 4; 2002–2004	Succeeded by Andy Duncan
Preceded by Mark Byford	Director-General of the BBC; 2004–2012	Succeeded by George Entwistle
Preceded by Arthur Ochs Sulzberger Jr.	CEO of The New York Times Company; 2012–2020	Succeeded by Meredith Kopit Levien
