= BBC Shop =

Online retailer owned by BBC Studios

- Industry: Retail
- Products: DVDs, audiobooks, books, toys, clothing
- Parent: BBC Studios
- Website: https://shop.bbc.com/

BBC Shop is an online retailer owned by BBC Studios, the commercial arm of the BBC and operating in the US & Canada. It sells BBC Studios published products, and selected BBC-related products published by third parties, including DVDs, books, audiobooks, toys and clothing. It is self-funded and returns profits to the BBC to be reinvested in programmes and services.

Following the launch of BBC Store, a service that offers UK residents the opportunity to purchase, stream and download BBC programmes, the UK's physical and online shop closed on 29 March 2016. However, the online shop in the US and Canada is still fully operating.

The BBC Shop was given UK delivery and GBP prices rather than American and Canadian dollars, when accessing the site in the UK.

== See also ==
- BBC Store
