= Director-General of the BBC =

Chief executive and editor-in-chief of the BBC

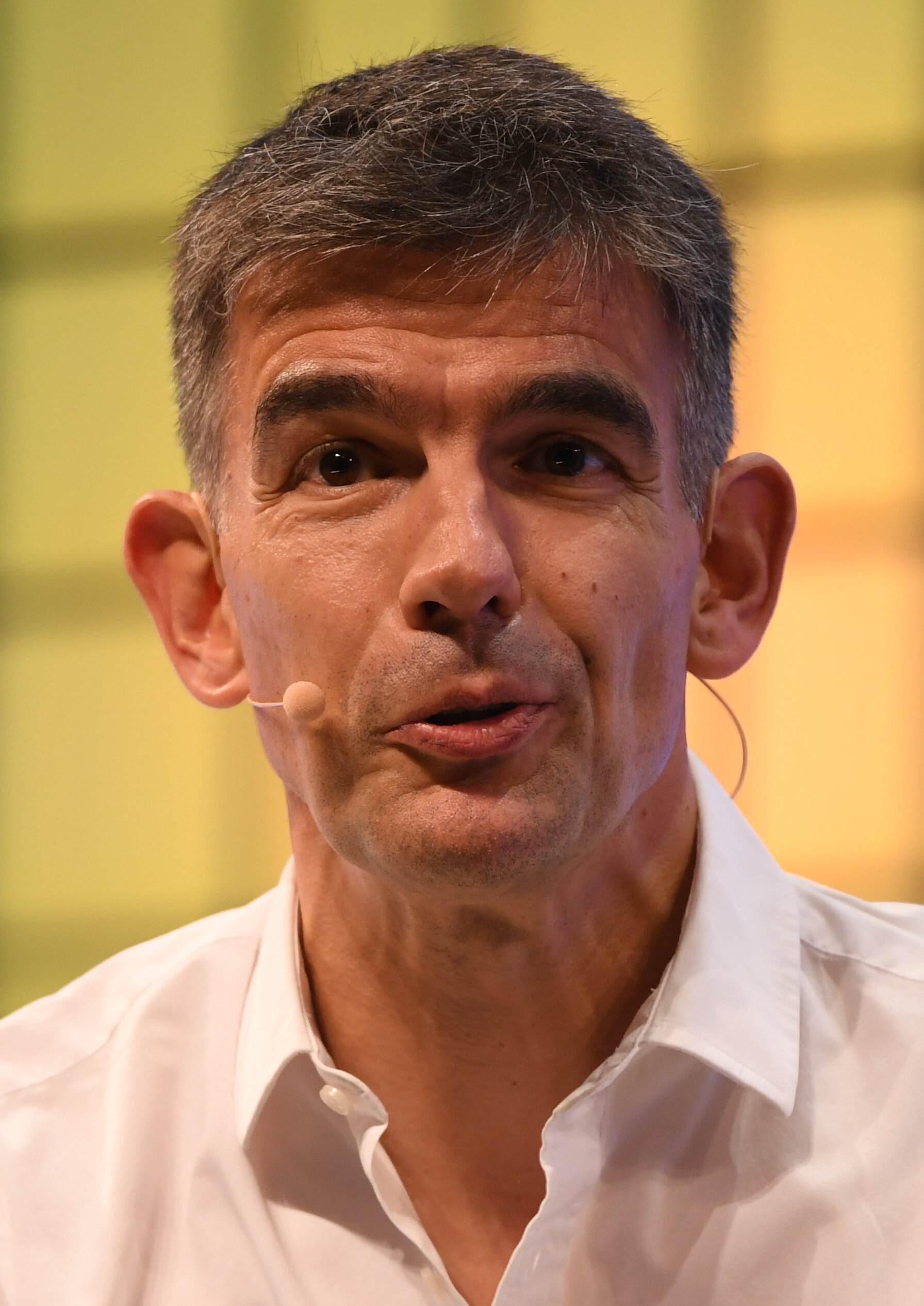
- Incumbent; Matt Brittin since 18 May 2026
- Member of: BBC Board; Executive Committee
- Reports to: BBC Board; Chairman of the BBC
- Appointer: BBC Board
- Precursor: General Manager of the BBC (1922–1923); Managing Director of the BBC (1923–1927)
- Formation: 1927
- First holder: Sir John Reith
- Salary: £565,000

The director-general of the British Broadcasting Corporation is chief executive and (from 1994) editor-in-chief of the BBC.

The post-holder was formerly appointed by the Board of Governors of the BBC (for the period 1927 to 2007) and then the BBC Trust (from 2007 to 2017). Since 2017, the director-general has been appointed by the BBC Board.

To date, 18 individuals have been appointed Director-General, plus an additional two who were appointed in an acting capacity only. The current director-general is Matt Brittin, who succeeded Tim Davie on 18 May 2026 after a period from 3 April 2026 to 17 May 2026, during which Rhodri Talfan Davies was Acting Director-General.

== List of directors-general ==
| No. | Image | Director-General | Term of office | | Length of term | Honour(s) |
|---|---|---|---|---|---|---|
| 1 | | Sir John Reith (1889–1971) | 1 January 1927 | 30 June 1938 | 11 years, 181 days | Knighted 1 January 1927, at the start of his term as DG. Peerage 21 October 1940, after stepping down as DG. Appointed to the Order of the Thistle 18 February 1969. |
| 2 | | Sir Frederick Ogilvie (1893–1949) | 19 July 1938 | 26 January 1942 | 3 years, 192 days | Knighted 10 June 1942, after stepping down as DG |
| 3 | | Sir Cecil Graves (1892–1957) (Note: Served concurrently with Foot.) | 26 January 1942 | 6 September 1943 | 1 year, 224 days | Knighted 1939, before becoming DG |
| 3–4 | | Robert Foot (1889–1973) (Note: Served concurrently with Graves until 6 September 1943.) | 26 January 1942 | 31 March 1944 | 2 years, 66 days | |
| 5 | | Sir William Haley (1901–1987) | 1944 | 1952 | 7–8 years | Knighted 1946, during his term as DG |
| 6 | | Sir Ian Jacob (1899–1993) | 1952 | 1959 | 6–7 years | Knighted 1 January 1960, after stepping down as DG |
| 7 | | Sir Hugh Greene (1910–1987) | 1960 | 1969 | 8–9 years | Knighted 1964, during his term as DG |
| 8 | | Sir Charles Curran (1921–1980) | 1969 | 1977 | 7–8 years | Knighted 1 January 1974, during his term as DG |
| 9 | | Sir Ian Trethowan (1922–1990) | 1977 | 1982 | 4–5 years | Knighted 1980, during his term as DG |
| 10 | | Alasdair Milne (1930–2013) | 1982 | January 1987 (Note: Ordered to resign by BBC Governors.) | 4–5 years | |
| 11 | | Sir Michael Checkland (born 1936) | 1987 | 1992 | 4–5 years | |
| 12 | | Sir John Birt (born 1944) | 1992 | 2000 | 7–8 years | Knighted 27 October 1998 during his term as DG. |
| 13 | | Greg Dyke (born 1947) | 2000 | 29 January 2004 | 3–4 years | |
| – | | Mark Byford (Note: Temporarily appointed as acting director-general) (born 1958) | January 2004 | June 2004 | 4–5 months | |
| 14 | | Mark Thompson (born 1957) | 22 June 2004 | 17 September 2012 | 8 years, 88 days | Knighted 17 June 2023, after stepping down as DG. |
| 15 | | George Entwistle (born 1962) | 17 September 2012 | 10 November 2012 | 55 days | |
| – | | Tim Davie (born 1967) | 11 November 2012 | 1 April 2013 | 142 days | |
| 16 | | Tony Hall, Baron Hall of Birkenhead (born 1951) | 2 April 2013 | 31 August 2020 | 7 years, 152 days | Life peerage 19 March 2010, before appointment as DG. |
| 17 | | Tim Davie (born 1967) | 1 September 2020 | 2 April 2026 | 5 years, 214 days | |
| – | | Rhodri Talfan Davies (born 1971) | 3 April 2026 | 17 May 2026 | 45 days | |
| 18 | | Matt Brittin (born 1968) | 18 May 2026 | Incumbent | 112 days | |

Italics indicate that the individual was temporarily appointed as acting director-general.
