= Andy Duncan (businessman) =

British businessman (born 1962)

Andy Duncan (born 31 July 1962) is CEO of Travelopia Holdings Limited, based in Crawley, UK. He was previously CEO of Camelot Limited (Camelot Group), the operator of the UK National Lottery. Duncan started his career at Unilever – where he spent 17 years in a variety of senior managerial roles – before he was appointed director of Marketing, Communications and Audiences at the BBC. Duncan then became chief executive of Britain's Channel 4 television channel from July 2004 to November 2009 – the first not to have a background in programme making – and was the founding chairman of Freeview. After a year as CEO of H.R. Owen plc, the UK's leading luxury car business, he became UK managing director of Camelot in October 2011 and was subsequently appointed UK CEO in October 2014. Duncan was appointed President of the Advertising Association in January 2014.

== Career in marketing ==
Duncan was educated at Whitgift School, an independent school in South Croydon, London, and at Manchester Institute of Technology, from which he graduated with a BSc in management sciences.

In 1984 he joined Unilever and worked his way up through the company. In 1995 Duncan was appointed Van Den Bergh Foods business unit chairman and marketing controller for spreads and margarines. He was responsible for the sponsorship of the London Marathon by one of his brands, Flora, a partnership that lasted 14 years. He also built the I Can't Believe It's Not Butter brand.

In 1997 he became Van Den Bergh Foods marketing director, and between January and December 1999 he was chairman of the Tea Council. In December 1999 he became European category director for Unilever's Foods and Beverages division, responsible for over €3 billion of turnover and around 10% of the corporation's global profits.. He was also a member of the Unilever's global category board.

== Career ==
In 2001 Duncan joined the BBC as director of marketing and communications on the BBC Executive Board. In July 2003 his title changed to director of marketing, communications and audiences. He was also a member of the BBC commercial holdings board and Creative Board.

While at the BBC he was nicknamed "The Implementer" and was known for his informal style. He supervised the expansion of the corporation's digital output including the launches of BBC 3 and 4, and Cbeebies and became chairman of Freeview, which took over the UK's digital terrestrial television service after the collapse of ITV Digital. To the surprise of many, Freeview became a fast-growing brand and in twenty months reached four million homes. It is now the UK's biggest digital TV platform and is in over 20 million homes. Duncan played a key role in the success of Freeview.. He was named Marketer of the Year in 2003.

On 1 July 2004 Duncan was appointed chief executive of Channel 4. He took up the job on 19 July 2004. During his time there he oversaw the company's emergence as a genuine multi-platform media business. Channel 4 was first broadcaster in the world to put its entire schedule online with the launch of its 4OD on-demand service in 2006. In addition, Channel 4's share of Total UK TV viewing grew from 10% to 12% and its share of the TV advertising market increased every year to a record 25% in 2009.

Duncan presided over the Celebrity Big Brother racism débacle, which provoked a record number of 45,000 complaints to Ofcom, the UK television watchdog. Ofcom found that Channel 4 had made "serious editorial misjudgements" in its handling of incidents involving Indian actress Shilpa Shetty. Labour MP Keith Vaz, who led protests in Parliament over the issue, called for Duncan to resign. Duncan admitted publicly that lessons had been learnt and Channel 4 took steps to handle subsequent issues better. Under Duncan's leadership, Channel 4 also won record numbers of creative and marketing awards including 13 Oscars. Duncan left the channel in November 2009

Duncan then went on to become CEO of H.R. Owen plc, the UK's leading luxury car business, for a year from September 2010. In October 2011 he was appointed UK managing director of Camelot (Camelot Group), the operator of the UK National Lottery. In this newly created role, Duncan was responsible for new game initiatives – such as the launch of the new Lotto game in October 2013 – and the development of a major new online and mobile platform, which launched in September 2014.

In April 2014 Duncan was appointed UK CEO of Camelot, effective 31 October 2014. In this role, he has overall responsibility for driving Camelot's strategy for growth through ongoing innovation. In addition, Duncan has been appointed to both the World Lottery Association (WLA) and European Lotteries (EL) Executive Committees, and chairs the WLA's Corporate Social Responsibility Committee.

Duncan chaired the Media Trust, a communications charity, from 2006 until 2014 and is now a trustee. He was on the board of HMV Group plc from March 2009 until early 2013. Duncan is also a trustee of Oasis Trust, the social action charity, and was part of an advisory group for the British Museum's chairman and Director General from 2009 until 2014. He was appointed President of the Advertising Association in January 2014.

Media offices
Preceded by Mark Thompson	Chief Executive of Channel 4; 2004–2010	Succeeded by David Abraham
