= Bakaya =

Bakaya is a surname. Notable people with the surname include:

- Mohit Bakaya (born 1964), British radio executive
- Priyanka Bakaya (fl. 2009–2016), Australian-American entrepreneur
