= Elan Closs Stephens =

Welsh educator and civil servant (born 1948)

Dame Elan Closs Stephens DBE DL
- Born: Elan Closs Roberts; 16 June 1948 (age 78); Talysarn, Gwynedd, Wales
- Education: Somerville College, Oxford
- Occupations: Acting Chairwoman, BBC; 27 June 2023 – 4 March 2024
- Spouse: Roy Stephens (m. 1972; died 1989)
- Children: 2

Dame Elan Closs Stephens DBE, DL, FLSW (née Roberts; born 16 June 1948) is a Welsh academic who has been a non-executive director of the BBC Board since 2017, and Chair of the BBC between 27 June 2023 and 4 March 2024. She is Electoral Commissioner for Wales and Pro-Chancellor of Aberystwyth University. She chairs the UNESCO International Prize for the Creative Economy panel.

== Life and career ==
Stephens was born on 16 June 1948 at Talysarn in the Nantlle Valley, Gwynedd, to William Jones Roberts and Mair née Closs. She attended the Ysgol Dyffryn Nantlle Secondary school before studying English at Somerville College, Oxford.

In 1998, Chris Smith, Secretary of State for Culture, Media and Sport, appointed Stephens to chair the S4C Authority, renewed for a second term until 2006. She was a Governor of the British Film Institute until 2007, chairing its Audit and Governance during the refurbishment of the Southbank Centre National Film Theatre. Chairwoman of the Wales Advisory Committee to the British Council until 2011, she was a board member of the Film Agency for Wales and a Trustee of Arts & Business.

Between 2001 and 2006, Stephens chaired Chwarae Teg, a body promoting economic development for women in Wales. After delivering the Stephens Report in 2006 on the financing and structure of the Arts in Wales to the Welsh Assembly Government, in 2009 she was appointed by the then Welsh Assembly Government's Minister for Social Justice and Local Government to chair the Recovery Board for Isle of Anglesey County Council, having delivered, in 2006, the Stephens Report on the financing and structure of the Arts in Wales to the Welsh Assembly Government.

Between 2009 and 2018, Stephens was a non-executive director of the Welsh Government's Strategic Delivery and Performance Board. In 2017, she was appointed Chairwoman of the Public Leadership Forum, overseeing CEOs of the Welsh Government arm's-length public bodies.

In 2019, she was appointed Professor Emerita of Communications and Creative Industries at Aberystwyth's Department of Theatre, Film and Television, and Pro-Chancellor of the university.

=== BBC ===
As a member of the Welsh Assembly Government's Strategic Delivery Performance Board, she was appointed, in October 2010, to the BBC Trust, and, in 2017, was reappointed as member for Wales on the new BBC Board.

Stephens served as Chair of the BBC between 27 June 2023 and 4 March 2024. On 2 July 2024, when interviewed by Welsh-language radio program Beti a'i Phobol, she thanked newsreader Huw Edwards for his "huge contribution" to the BBC and "all the skills he has demonstrated." After Edwards' arrest and guilty plea to charges related to child pornography, she issued, in August 2024, a statement in which she expressed her "shock" at the "revelations from the court." The same week, BBC director general Tim Davie publicly defended the corporation's handling of the case.

== Awards and accolades ==
Appointed a Commander of the Order of the British Empire (CBE) in 2001 "for services to broadcasting and the Welsh Language", Stephens was promoted to Dame Commander of the Order of the British Empire (DBE) in the 2019 Birthday Honours.

Stephens is a Deputy Lieutenant for Dyfed since 2019. Elected a Fellow of the Learned Society of Wales in 2019, An Honorary Fellow of Somerville College, Oxford, Aberystwyth University, Bangor University and of the University of Wales Trinity St David, Stephens has received honorary doctorates from the University of South Wales, the University of Wales and the Open University. She is also a Fellow of the Royal Society of Arts and of the Institute of Welsh Affairs. She was awarded an honorary fellowship from Bangor University in 2019.

== Personal life ==
On 27 September 1972, she married Roy Stephens and they had two children. Stephens died in 1989.

Media offices
Preceded by Richard Sharp	Acting Chair of the BBC Board; 27 June 2023 – 4 March 2024	Succeeded by Samir Shah as Chair of the BBC Board
