= Talysarn =

Village in Gwynedd, Wales

Coordinates: 53.052°N 4.256°W

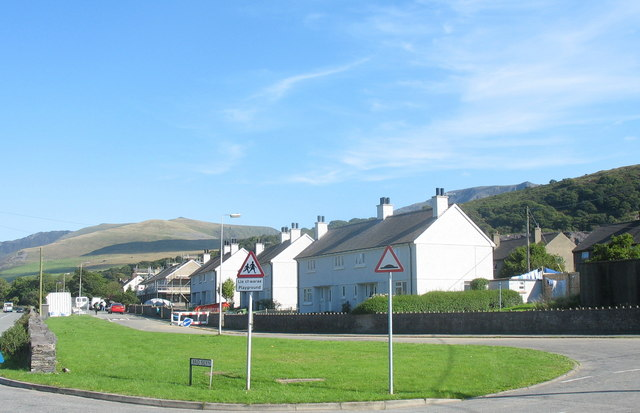

- Location within Gwynedd
- Population: 1,930 (ward 2011)
- OS grid reference: SH488529
- Community: Llanllyfni
- Principal area: Gwynedd
- Preserved county: Gwynedd
- Country: Wales
- Sovereign state: United Kingdom
- Post town: CAERNARFON
- Postcode district: LL54
- Dialling code: 01286
- Police: North Wales
- Fire: North Wales
- Ambulance: Welsh
- UK Parliament: Dwyfor Meirionnydd
- Senedd Cymru – Welsh Parliament: Arfon

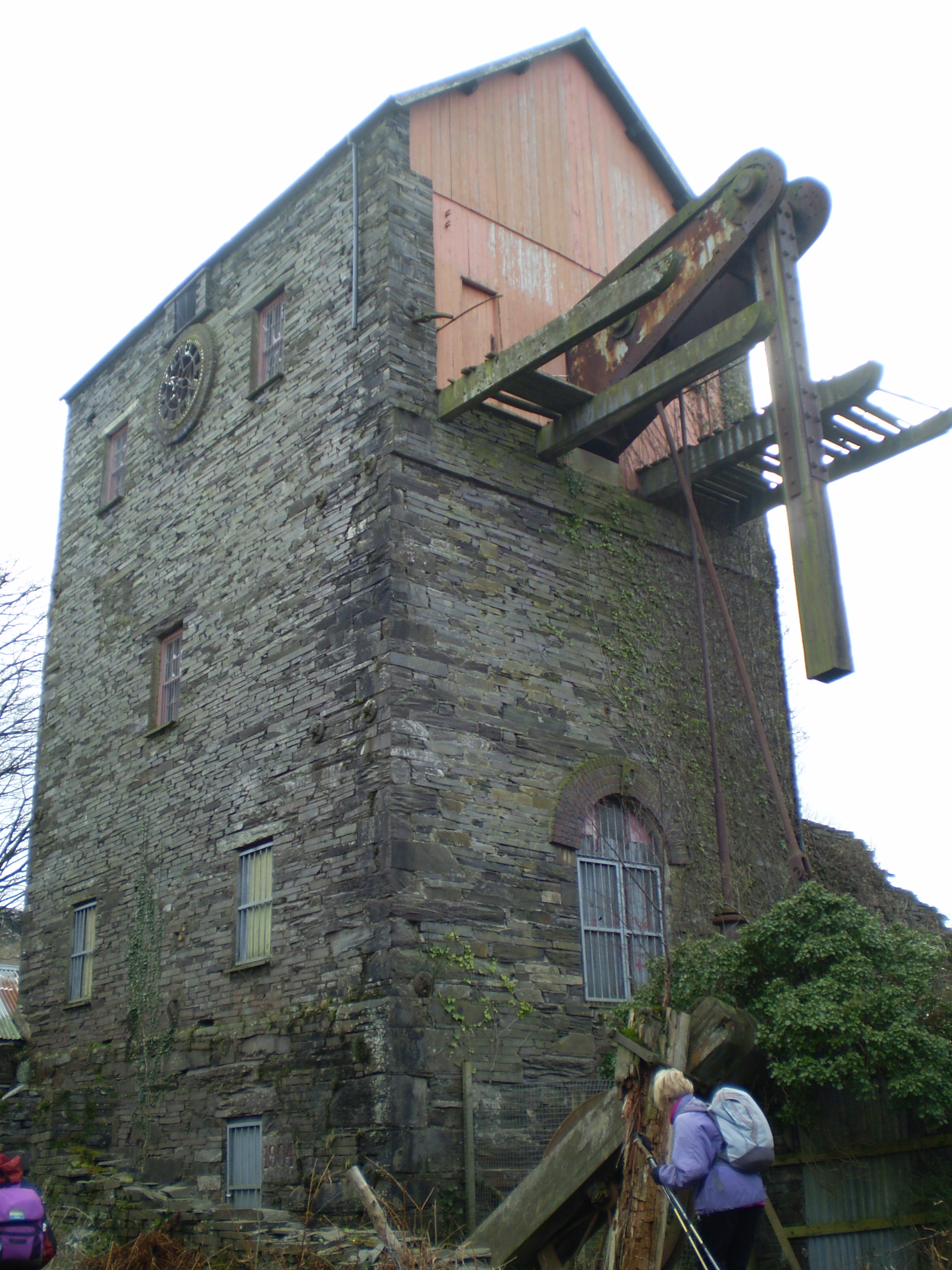
Cornish beam engine near Talysarn

Tal-y-sarn (Welsh pronunciation) is a village in the slate quarrying Nantlle Valley in Gwynedd, Wales, next to Penygroes. It is part of the community of Llanllyfni and includes some of Llandwrog. The ward had a population of 1,930 at the 2011 census, the built-up area having a population of 1,086.

The Welsh language poet Robert Williams Parry was born in 37, Station Road, Tal-y-sarn, where a plaque designed by R. L. Gapper commemorates the connection. Other persons connected with the village were Annant, quarryman, preacher and bard, Gwilym R. Jones, bard and journalist, Idwal Jones author of the Welsh-language radio series SOS, Galw Gari Tryfan and Dame Elan Closs Stephens DBE (born 1948) a Welsh educator and Wales' representative on the BBC Board.

The 19th century methodist preacher John Jones, Tal-y-sarn, is also connected with the village, not by birth but because he settled here, becoming a shopkeeper and quarry owner as a sideline to his main vocation.

The song "Ciosg Talysarn" by the Welsh folk singer Dafydd Iwan was written after two secret agents were found bugging a public telephone in Tal-y-sarn in 1982.

Tal-y-sarn is covered by a Neighbourhood Policing Team based in the nearby village of Pen-y-groes.

== Welsh Language ==
According to the United Kingdom Census 2021, 72.3 per cent of all usual residents aged 3+ in Talysarn can speak Welsh. 79.2 per cent of the population noted that they could speak, read, write or understand Welsh. The 2011 census noted 70.7 per cent of all usual residents aged 3 years and older in the village could speak Welsh.
