= Chair of the BBC =

Head of British Broadcasting Corporation's board

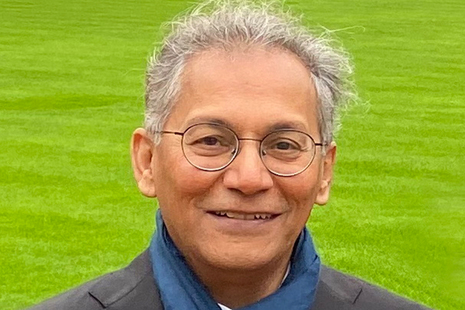
- Incumbent; Dr Samir Shah since 4 Mar 2024
- BBC Board; BBC
- Member of: BBC Board
- Appointer: Monarch, on the advice of the Secretary of State.
- Term length: Four years, renewable once
- Constituting instrument: Royal charter
- First holder: Jack Pease, 1st Baron Gainford
- Salary: £160,000

The Chair of the BBC, referred to as Chairman when the incumbent is male and Chairwoman when female, is the head of the BBC Board, responsible for maintaining the independence of the BBC and overseeing the functioning of the BBC to fulfil its mission. The chair leads the process for appointing the Director-General and can dismiss the Director-General. The chair of the BBC also acts as the corporation's most senior representative to Parliament and the government, including the devolved administrations.

The chair is formally appointed by the King-in-Council, on the advice of the Secretary of State for a four-year term. The current chairman, Dr Samir Shah, succeeded chairwoman Dame Elan Closs Stephens on 4 March 2024.

== List of chairmen ==
Status

Denotes Acting Chair

Portrait	Name (Birth–Death)	Term of office		Honour(s)	Prime Minister	Monarch
=== British Broadcasting Company ===						George V r. 1910–1936
	Jack Pease, 1st Baron Gainford (1860–1943)	18 December 1922	31 December 1926		David Lloyd George	George V r. 1910–1936
	Jack Pease, 1st Baron Gainford (1860–1943)	18 December 1922	31 December 1926		Bonar Law	George V r. 1910–1936
	Jack Pease, 1st Baron Gainford (1860–1943)	18 December 1922	31 December 1926		Stanley Baldwin	George V r. 1910–1936
	Jack Pease, 1st Baron Gainford (1860–1943)	18 December 1922	31 December 1926		Ramsay MacDonald	George V r. 1910–1936
	Jack Pease, 1st Baron Gainford (1860–1943)	18 December 1922	31 December 1926		Stanley Baldwin	George V r. 1910–1936
=== BBC Board of Governors ===						George V r. 1910–1936
	George Villiers, 6th Earl of Clarendon (1877–1955)	1 January 1927	1930		Stanley Baldwin	George V r. 1910–1936
	George Villiers, 6th Earl of Clarendon (1877–1955)	1 January 1927	1930		Ramsay MacDonald	George V r. 1910–1936
	John Henry Whitley (1866–1935)	1930	3 February 1935 (Died in Office)		Ramsay MacDonald	George V r. 1910–1936
	William Bridgeman, 1st Viscount Bridgeman (1864–1935)	1935	14 August 1935 (Died in Office)		Ramsay MacDonald	George V r. 1910–1936
	William Bridgeman, 1st Viscount Bridgeman (1864–1935)	1935	14 August 1935 (Died in Office)		Stanley Baldwin	George V r. 1910–1936
	Ronald Collet Norman (1873–1963)	1935	1939		Stanley Baldwin	George V r. 1910–1936
	Ronald Collet Norman (1873–1963)	1935	1939		Neville Chamberlain	Edward VIII r. 1936
	Ronald Collet Norman (1873–1963)	1935	1939		Neville Chamberlain	George VI r. 1936–1952
	Allan Powell (1876–1948)	1939	1946		Neville Chamberlain	George VI r. 1936–1952
	Allan Powell (1876–1948)	1939	1946		Winston Churchill	George VI r. 1936–1952
	Allan Powell (1876–1948)	1939	1946		Clement Attlee	George VI r. 1936–1952
	Philip Inman, 1st Baron Inman (1892–1979)	1947	1947		Clement Attlee	George VI r. 1936–1952
	Ernest Simon, 1st Baron Simon of Wythenshawe (1879–1960)	1947	1952		Clement Attlee	George VI r. 1936–1952
	Ernest Simon, 1st Baron Simon of Wythenshawe (1879–1960)	1947	1952		Winston Churchill	Elizabeth II r. 1952–2022
	Alexander Cadogan (1884–1968)	1952	1957		Winston Churchill	Elizabeth II r. 1952–2022
	Alexander Cadogan (1884–1968)	1952	1957		Anthony Eden	Elizabeth II r. 1952–2022
	Alexander Cadogan (1884–1968)	1952	1957		Harold Macmillan	Elizabeth II r. 1952–2022
	Arthur fforde (1900–1985)	1957	1964		Harold Macmillan	Elizabeth II r. 1952–2022
	Arthur fforde (1900–1985)	1957	1964		Alec Douglas-Home	Elizabeth II r. 1952–2022
	Norman Brook, 1st Baron Normanbrook (1902–1967)	1964	15 June 1967 (Died in Office)		Harold Wilson	Elizabeth II r. 1952–2022
	Charles Hill, Baron Hill of Luton (1904–1989)	1967	1972		Harold Wilson	Elizabeth II r. 1952–2022
	Charles Hill, Baron Hill of Luton (1904–1989)	1967	1972		Edward Heath	Elizabeth II r. 1952–2022
	Michael Swann (1920–1990)	1973	1980	Baron Swann for Life in 1981	Edward Heath	Elizabeth II r. 1952–2022
	Michael Swann (1920–1990)	1973	1980	Baron Swann for Life in 1981	Harold Wilson	Elizabeth II r. 1952–2022
	Michael Swann (1920–1990)	1973	1980	Baron Swann for Life in 1981	James Callaghan	Elizabeth II r. 1952–2022
	Michael Swann (1920–1990)	1973	1980	Baron Swann for Life in 1981	Margaret Thatcher	Elizabeth II r. 1952–2022
	George Howard (1920–1984)	1980	1983	Baron Howard of Henderskelfe for Life in 1981	Margaret Thatcher	Elizabeth II r. 1952–2022
	Stuart Young (1934–1986)	1983	29 August 1986 (Died in Office)		Margaret Thatcher	Elizabeth II r. 1952–2022
	Marmaduke Hussey (1923–2006)	1986	1996	Baron Hussey of North Bradley for Life in 1996	Margaret Thatcher	Elizabeth II r. 1952–2022
	Marmaduke Hussey (1923–2006)	1986	1996	Baron Hussey of North Bradley for Life in 1996	John Major	Elizabeth II r. 1952–2022
	Christopher Bland (1938–2017)	1 April 1996	30 September 2001		John Major	Elizabeth II r. 1952–2022
	Christopher Bland (1938–2017)	1 April 1996	30 September 2001		Tony Blair	Elizabeth II r. 1952–2022
	Gavyn Davies (1950–)	1 October 2001	28 January 2004		Tony Blair	Elizabeth II r. 1952–2022
	Richard Ryder, Baron Ryder of Wensum (1949–)	28 January 2004	17 May 2004		Tony Blair	Elizabeth II r. 1952–2022
	Michael Grade (1943–)	17 May 2004	28 November 2006	Baron Grade of Yarmouth for Life in 2011	Tony Blair	Elizabeth II r. 1952–2022
	Anthony Salz (1950–)	28 November 2006	31 December 2006	Knighted in 2013	Tony Blair	Elizabeth II r. 1952–2022
=== BBC Trust ===						Elizabeth II r. 1952–2022
	Chitra Bharucha (1945–)	1 January 2007	30 April 2007		Tony Blair	Elizabeth II r. 1952–2022
	Sir Michael Lyons (1949–)	1 May 2007	30 April 2011		Tony Blair	Elizabeth II r. 1952–2022
	Sir Michael Lyons (1949–)	1 May 2007	30 April 2011		Gordon Brown	Elizabeth II r. 1952–2022
	Sir Michael Lyons (1949–)	1 May 2007	30 April 2011		David Cameron	Elizabeth II r. 1952–2022
	Chris Patten, Baron Patten of Barnes (1944–)	1 May 2011	6 May 2014		David Cameron	Elizabeth II r. 1952–2022
	Diane Coyle (1961–)	6 May 2014	8 October 2014		David Cameron	Elizabeth II r. 1952–2022
	Rona Fairhead (1961–)	9 October 2014	2 April 2017	Baroness Fairhead for Life in 2017	David Cameron	Elizabeth II r. 1952–2022
	Rona Fairhead (1961–)	9 October 2014	2 April 2017	Baroness Fairhead for Life in 2017	Theresa May	Elizabeth II r. 1952–2022
=== BBC Board ===						Elizabeth II r. 1952–2022
	Sir David Clementi (1949–)	16 February 2017	15 February 2021	Knighted in 2004	Theresa May	Elizabeth II r. 1952–2022
	Sir David Clementi (1949–)	16 February 2017	15 February 2021	Knighted in 2004	Boris Johnson	Elizabeth II r. 1952–2022
	Richard Sharp (1956–)	16 February 2021	27 June 2023		Boris Johnson	Elizabeth II r. 1952–2022
	Richard Sharp (1956–)	16 February 2021	27 June 2023		Liz Truss	Elizabeth II r. 1952–2022
	Richard Sharp (1956–)	16 February 2021	27 June 2023		Liz Truss	Charles III r. 2022–present
	Richard Sharp (1956–)	16 February 2021	27 June 2023		Rishi Sunak	Charles III r. 2022–present
	Dame Elan Closs Stephens (1948–)	27 June 2023	4 March 2024	Knighted as a Dame in 2019	Rishi Sunak	Charles III r. 2022–present
	Dr Samir Shah (1952–)	4 March 2024	Incumbent		Rishi Sunak	Charles III r. 2022–present
	Dr Samir Shah (1952–)	4 March 2024	Incumbent		Sir Keir Starmer	Charles III r. 2022–present

== See also ==
- BBC Charter
