= Samir Shah =

British television and radio executive (born 1952)

Samir Shah CBE
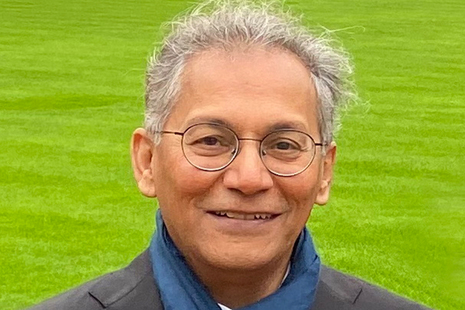

Chairman of the BBC
- Incumbent
- Assumed office 4 March 2024
- Preceded by: Richard Sharp; Elan Closs Stephens (acting)

Personal details
- Born: 29 January 1952 (age 74) Aurangabad, India
- Relatives: Mohit Bakaya (half-brother), Controller of BBC Radio 4
- Education: University of Hull (BSc); St Catherine's College, Oxford (DPhil)
- Occupation: CEO, Juniper
- Known for: BBC executive roles; Broadcasting
- Awards: CBE

Samir Shah, CBE (born 29 January 1952), is a British television and radio executive, who has been the Chair of the BBC since March 2024. He has worked in the past for the BBC and London Weekend Television, and was chief executive of Juniper TV. In 2021, he co-authored the UK government's Commission on Race and Ethnic Disparities report.

== Early life and education ==
Shah was born in 1952 in Aurangabad, India, to Amrit Shah and Uma Bakaya; the family moved to England in 1960. His half-brother, with whom he shares the same mother, is Mohit Bakaya, who became controller of BBC Radio 4.

Shah attended Latymer Upper School, a direct grant school at the time of Shah's attendance, which became an independent school in 1976. It is based in West London. He earned a BSc in geography at the University of Hull. In 1979, he obtained a DPhil in anthropology and geography at St Catherine's College, Oxford. His thesis was "Aspects of the geographic analysis of Asian immigrants in London".

== Career ==
Shah joined London Weekend Television in 1979, where he was to work with two major figures in his career, John Birt, later director-general of the BBC, and Michael Wills, from whom he was to purchase Juniper TV, both of whom became life peers. In 1987, he was appointed BBC's head of television current affairs and from 1994 to 1998 was head of the BBC’s political journalism programmes. Shah has said that his decision to leave the BBC for the commercial world was influenced by a very long and expensive executives' residential course given by the London Business School which was "incredibly useful and covered proper, grown-up things"; "the importance of obvious stuff like talking to the people who work for you"; and "it is perfectly possible to make better programmes for less cost". The downside was that, having experienced a feel for the commercial world, the course was "quite significant" in his choosing to move on from the BBC.

In 1998, Shah purchased Juniper TV from Wills on the latter's election as a member of parliament, since when he has operated as its CEO and creative director. Juniper's programmes have been broadcast on the BBC, Channel 4, National Geographic, Discovery, TLC and Netflix.

Shah's appointment as one of the then three non-executive directors of the BBC in 2007 led to a potential conflict of interest, as Juniper was supplying programmes to the BBC, with Greenslade in 2007 reporting that Shah "steps out if the board touches on any area that might affect his business expertise in broadcasting is considered". Shah was involved in advising director-general Sir Mark Thompson over the Crowngate affair which resulted in BBC One controller Peter Fincham resigning from the BBC. Shah was reported as claiming in 2008 that "One BBC ethos" presented a "monolithic posture that makes it appear anti-competitive".

As of 2024, Bakaya is controller of BBC Radio 4.

On 4 March 2024, Shah commenced his role as chair of the BBC's non-executive board, undertaking a four-year term until March 2028. In his role, he receives a salary of £160,000 per year.

In August 2024, Shah received a letter from around 200 people employed by the BBC calling for an investigation into alleged institutional antisemitism at the corporation. Shah dismissed these calls for an investigation, praising the BBC for having an "inclusive" environment.

== Boards and appointments ==
- Arts and Heritage: Deputy Chairman (2012–14) & Trustee (2005–14) of the V&A; Chairman of the Museum of the Home (2014–22); member of the Cultural Recovery Board (2020–21); and of the Heritage Advisory Board (2020)
- Media: Non-Executive Director of the BBC Board (2007–10); member of the Future of public service broadcasting (2021); Board member, BAFTA; Chairman of One World Media (2020–); Chair of the BBC (2024–)
- Multicultural: Commissioner on HMG Commission on Race and Ethnic Disparities; Chairman of the Runnymede Trust (1999–2009); Member, PM Holocaust Commission (2014–15)
- Academic: 2019 Visiting Professor of Creative Media, Oxford University (Faculty of English), 2006–17; Special Professor, University of Nottingham.

== Honours and awards ==
Shah was appointed an OBE "for services to equal opportunities in broadcasting" in 2001, and elected a Fellow of the Royal Television Society in 2002. He was promoted to a CBE "for services to heritage and television" in 2019.

Referred to by The Guardian in June 2008 as "one of the most successful figures in modern British broadcasting", in February 2022 he received an Outstanding Contribution Award from the Royal Television Society for services over 40 years and commitment to diversity in television journalism.

== Works ==
- Shah, Samir (2008). "The BBC, Viewed from Inside and Out". In Gardam, Tim; Levy, David A.L. (eds.). The Price of Plurality: Choice, Diversity and Broadcasting Institutions in the Digital Age (PDF) (Report). Reuters Institute for the Study of Journalism. ISBN 978-0-95-588890-8. Archived (PDF) from the original on 13 June 2021.

== Sources ==
- Arts Council England (2021). "Culture Recovery Board". www.artscouncil.org.uk.
- Bates, Stephen (27 June 2008). "People". The Guardian. Archived from the original on 6 December 2021.
- BBC Press Office (January 2007). "Biographies: Dr Samir Shah OBE". www.bbc.co.uk.
- Brown, Maggie (12 May 2008). "Samir Shah: why the BBC needs radical reform". The Guardian. Archived from the original on 6 December 2021.
- Choppen, Chloe (21 April 2020). "One World Media delighted to announce Samir Shah as new Chair". One World Media.
- "Journalism Award for Samir Shah". Eastern Eye. 25 March 2022 – via PressReader.
- FT (9 February 1998). "Inside track for Shah". Financial Times (London ed.). ProQuest 248581104.
- Gov.UK (2021). "Commissioner – Commission on Race and Ethnic Disparities: Dr Samir Shah CBE". GOV.UK. Archived from the original on 6 December 2021.
- Gov.UK (2021b). "The Heritage Advisory Board". GOV.UK.
- Greenslade, Roy (28 November 2007). "So what is the point of these five non-execs sitting on BBC board?". Media Analysis. Evening Standard. London. ProQuest 330115463.
- Juniper TV (November 2021). "Samir Shah: Chief Executive and Creative Director". www.junipertv.co.uk. Archived from the original on 4 March 2016.
- Juniper TV (2021c). "Television Archive". www.junipertv.co.uk.
- One World Media (2021). "About:Meet Our Trustees". One World Media.
- OUP (2021). Who's Who 2022 (174 ed.). doi:10.1093/ww/9780199540884.013.U45444. ISBN 978-1472979070. Shah, Samir.
- Robins, Jane (22 February 2000). "Media: Fancy Harvard? join the BBC if Harvard Business School appeals, but you can't afford the fees, become a BBC manager. Auntie may be able to help you out". The Independent (Final ed.). ProQuest 311622243.

Media offices
Preceded by Elan Closs Stephens as Acting Chair of the BBC Board	Chair of the BBC Board; 4 March 2024 –	Incumbent
