= 1932 Wakefield by-election =

UK Parliamentary by-election

The 1932 Wakefield by-election was held on 21 April 1932. The by-election was held due to the death of the incumbent Conservative MP, George Brown Hillman. It was won by the Labour candidate Arthur Greenwood.

Wakefield by-election, 1932
Party	Candidate	Votes	%	±%
Labour	Arthur Greenwood	13,586	50.6	+8.0
Conservative	A. E. Greaves	13,242	49.4	−8.0
Majority		344	1.2	N/A
Turnout		26,828	83.0	−2.5
Labour gain from Conservative		Swing		
