= Mohit Bakaya =

British radio producer

Mohit Bakaya Hon. FRSL
- Born: 12 November 1964 (age 61) south west London, England
- Education: Keble College, Oxford
- Occupation: radio producer
- Known for: controller of BBC Radio 4
- Spouse(s): Josephine Ryan; Victoria Shepherd
- Children: 2 sons, 1 daughter
- Parents: Madan (father); Uma (mother)

Mohit Bakaya, (born 12 November 1964) is the controller of BBC Radio 4. He joined the BBC in 1993 and produced programmes such as Front Row and Night Waves before becoming the commissioning editor for factual in 2008.

He was appointed as controller of Radio 4 in 2019, replacing Gwyneth Williams.

In 2023, Bakaya was elected an Honorary Fellow of the Royal Society of Literature.

== Early life ==
Mohit Bakaya was born in southwest London in 1964. His father Madan was a Bollywood production manager who had moved to England in the early 1960s to promote Hindi films. Bakaya's mother Uma was a software developer for IBM; she died when he was eight. His half-brother, Samir Shah, who is 13 years older than Bakaya, shared the same mother. As of 2024, Shah is chairman of the BBC.

Bakaya attended a state school in Pimlico, before reading Philosophy, Politics and Economics at Keble College, Oxford.

== Career ==
In 1993, Bakaya was chosen by the BBC for a training scheme. He has been a producer and editor of arts programmes on BBC Radio 3 and BBC Radio 4. In 1998, he launched the Radio 4 arts magazine series Front Row. He became controller of Radio 4 and Radio 4 Extra in 2019.

== Personal life ==
Bakaya's first marriage was to Josephine Ryan, an antiques dealer, with whom he has a son and daughter. Bakaya's second wife, Victoria Shepherd, is an author who was a producer with him on Radio 3's Night Waves. The couple have a son.
