= List of honorary fellows of Somerville College, Oxford =

Honorary fellows of Somerville College, Oxford.

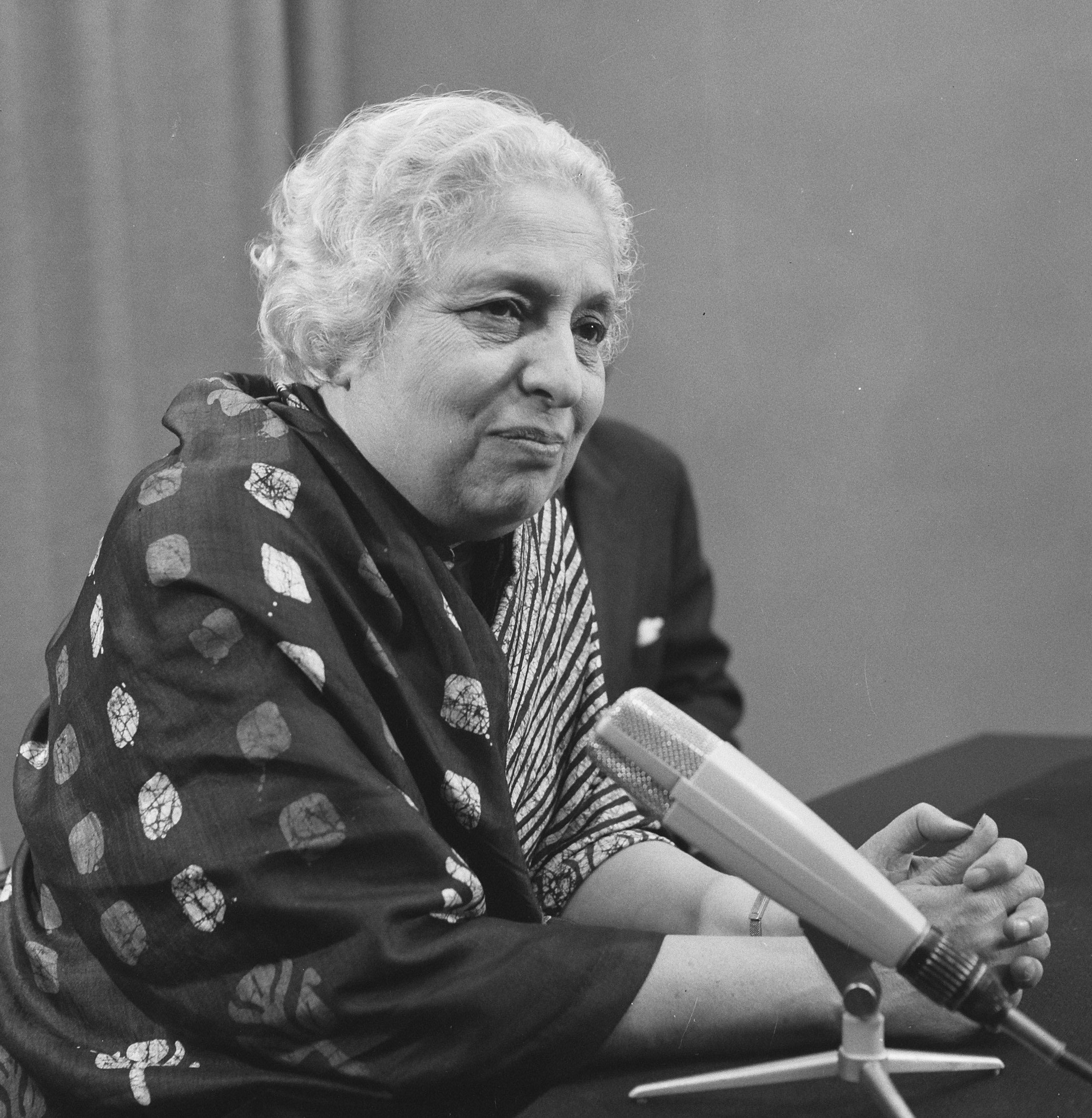
Vijaya Lakshmi Pandit

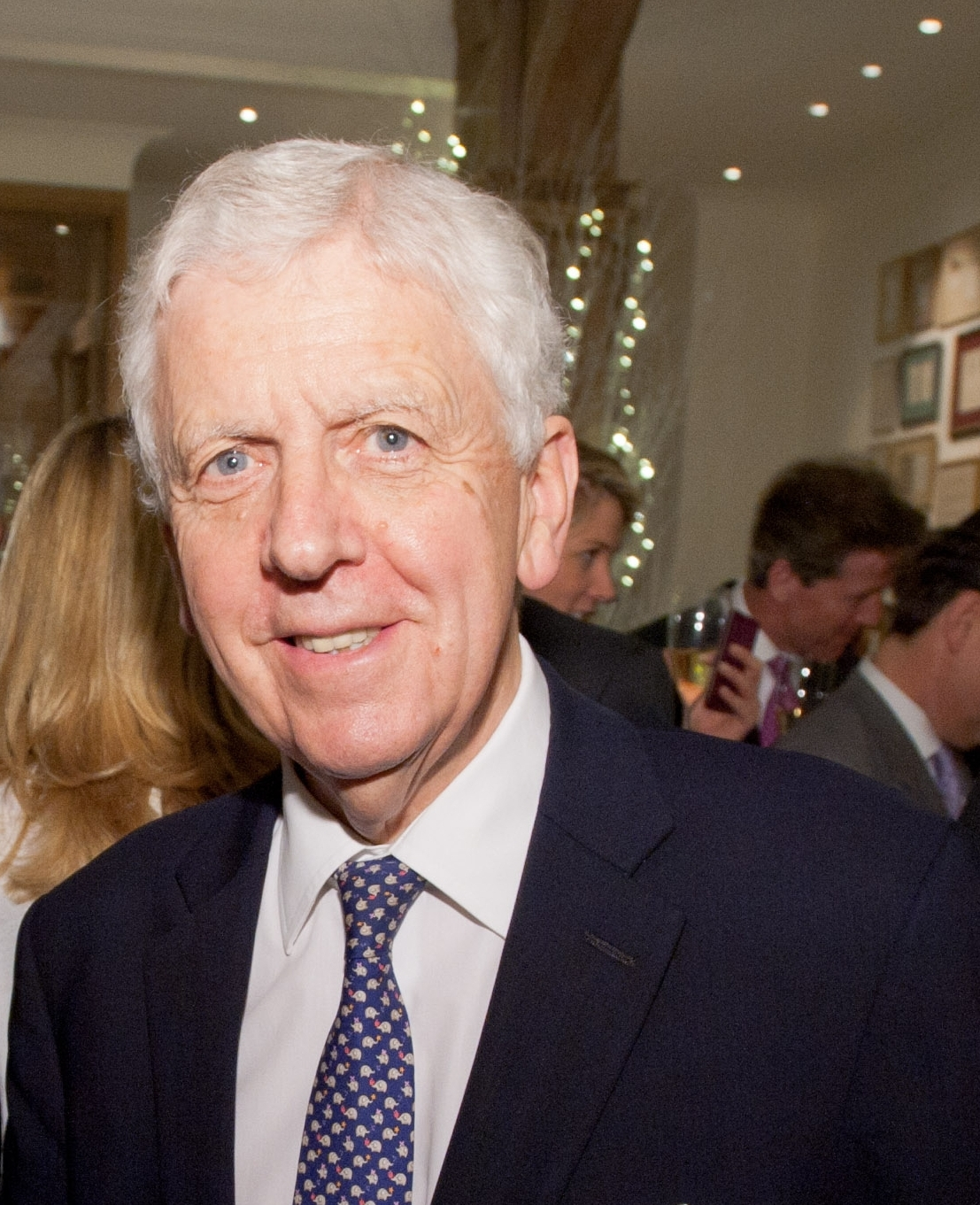
Charles Powell, Baron Powell of Bayswater

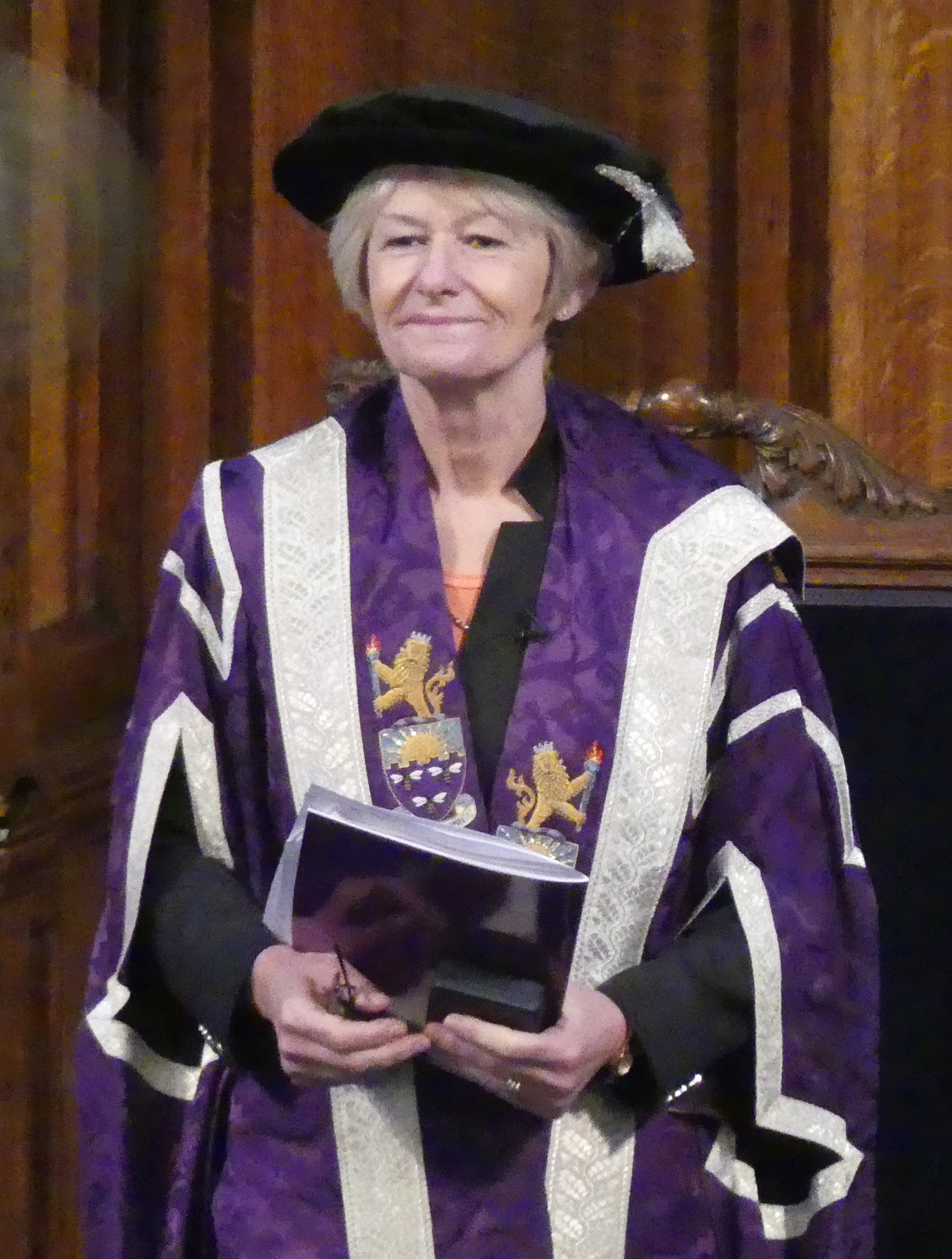
Nancy Rothwell

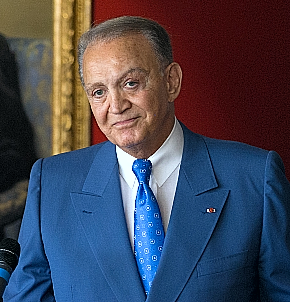
Wafic Saïd

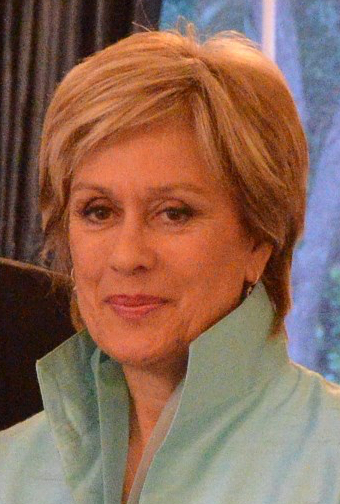
Kiri Te Kanawa

- Manel Abeysekera
- Bolanle Awe
- Alyson Bailes
- Caroline Barron
- Janet Bately
- Sir Simon Russell Beale
- Doreen Boyce
- Sarah Broadie
- Dame Gillian Brown
- Paula Pimlott Brownlee
- Alice Bruce
- Dame Antonia Byatt
- Dame Fiona Caldicott
- Dame Averil Cameron
- Margaret Casely-Hayford
- Elizabeth Millicent Chilver
- Dame Ellen Closs Stephens
- Dame Kay Davies
- Patricia Davies
- Ruth Finnegan
- Philippa Foot
- Hazel Fox
- Clara Freeman
- Victoria Glendinning
- Jenny Glusker
- Joanna Haigh
- Kamila Hawthorne
- Dame Julia Higgins
- Carole Hillenbrand
- Judith Howard
- Catherine Hughes
- Lorna Hutson
- Dame Tamsyn Imison
- Margaret Jay, Baroness Jay of Paddington
- Dame Louise Johnson
- Dame Mary Keegan
- Margaret Kenyon
- Dame Emma Kirkby
- Akua Kuenyehia
- Afua Kyei
- Anna Laura Lepschy
- Anne Makena
- Dame Rosalind Marsden
- Harriet Maunsell
- May McKisack
- Dame Angela McLean
- Mary Midgley
- Michele Moody-Adams
- Lucy Neville-Rolfe, Baroness Neville-Rolfe
- Robert Ng (Foundation Fellow)
- Kate Norgate
- Ann Oakley
- Dame Kathleen Ollerenshaw
- Onora O'Neill, Baroness O'Neill of Bengarve
- Vijaya Lakshmi Pandit
- Daphne Park, Baroness Park of Monmouth
- Dame Judith Parker
- Charles Powell, Baron Powell of Bayswater (Foundation Fellow)
- Alice Prochaska
- Dame June Raine
- Nicola Ralston
- Sir Venkatraman Ramakrishnan
- Dame Esther Rantzen
- Joyce Reynolds
- Sacha Romanovitch
- Tessa Ross
- Emma Rothschild
- Dame Nancy Rothwell
- Janet Royall, Baroness Royall of Blaisdon
- Catherine Royle
- Wafic Saïd (Foundation Fellow)
- Caroline Series
- Emma Smith
- Hilary Spurling
- Theresa Stewart
- Gopal Subramanium (Foundation Fellow)
- Dame Kiri Te Kanawa
- Margaret Thatcher, Baroness Thatcher
- Shriti Vadera, Baroness Vadera
- Dame Anne Warburton
- Jean Wilks
- Clair Wills
- Shirley Williams, Baroness Williams of Crosby
- Alison Wolf, Baroness Wolf of Dulwich
- Farhana Yamin
- Julia Yeomans
