= Arthur Greenwood =

British politician (1880–1954)

The Right Honourable Arthur Greenwood CH MP
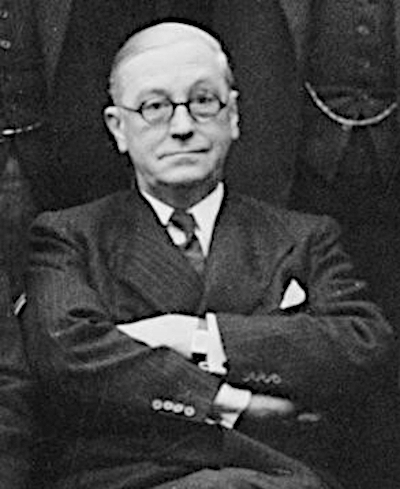
- Greenwood in October 1941

Paymaster General
- In office 9 July 1946 – 5 March 1947
- Prime Minister: Clement Attlee
- Preceded by: Frederick Lindemann
- Succeeded by: Hilary Marquand

Lord Keeper of the Privy Seal
- In office 27 July 1945 – 17 April 1947
- Prime Minister: Clement Attlee
- Preceded by: Max Aitken
- Succeeded by: Philip Inman

Minister without Portfolio
- In office 17 April 1947 – 29 September 1947
- Prime Minister: Clement Attlee
- Preceded by: A. V. Alexander
- Succeeded by: Geoffrey FitzClarence
- In office 11 May 1940 – 22 February 1942
- Prime Minister: Winston Churchill
- Preceded by: Maurice Hankey
- Succeeded by: William Jowitt

Leader of the Opposition
- In office February 1942 – 23 May 1945
- Prime Minister: Winston Churchill
- Preceded by: Frederick Pethick-Lawrence
- Succeeded by: Clement Attlee

Deputy Leader of the Labour Party
- In office 26 November 1935 – 25 May 1945
- Leader: Clement Attlee
- Preceded by: Clement Attlee
- Succeeded by: Herbert Morrison

Minister of Health
- In office 7 June 1929 – 24 August 1931
- Prime Minister: Ramsay MacDonald
- Preceded by: Neville Chamberlain
- Succeeded by: Neville Chamberlain

Member of Parliament for Wakefield
- In office 21 April 1932 – 9 June 1954
- Preceded by: George Brown Hillman
- Succeeded by: Arthur Creech Jones

Member of Parliament for Nelson and Colne
- In office 15 November 1922 – 7 October 1931
- Preceded by: Robinson Graham
- Succeeded by: Linton Thorp

Personal details
- Born: 8 February 1880 Hunslet, Leeds, England
- Died: 9 June 1954 (aged 74) London, England
- Party: Labour
- Spouse: Catherine Ainsworth
- Children: 2, including Tony

Arthur Greenwood CH (8 February 1880 – 9 June 1954) was a British politician. A prominent member of the Labour Party from the 1920s until the late 1940s, Greenwood rose to prominence within the party as secretary of its research department from 1920 and served as Parliamentary Secretary to the Ministry of Health in the short-lived Labour government of 1924. He served as Minister of Health in the second Labour government between 1929 and 1931, later becoming Deputy Leader of the Labour Party in 1935 under Clement Attlee.

In 1940, he was appointed to Winston Churchill's War Cabinet when Labour joined the wartime coalition government. During the May 1940 war cabinet crisis he emerged as the strongest and most vocal supporter of Churchill’s position that Britain should continue fighting Nazi Germany in World War II instead of accepting peace terms.

He also played a role in the postwar Attlee government, helping to establish the National Health Service.

== Early life ==
Greenwood was born in Hunslet, a working-class district of Leeds, the son of Margaret Nunns, and William Greenwood, a painter and decorator. As a schoolboy, he read the socialist magazine The Clarion and bought Labour pamphlets from the Leeds market. He was educated at the Yorkshire College (which later became the University of Leeds), where he took a BSc. He went on to become head of economics at Huddersfield Technical College.

In 1914, he moved to London, where he found work as a civil servant in the Ministry of Reconstruction, working closely with Christopher Addison and Arthur Henderson. He established himself within the Labour Party's intellectual circles, and was appointed secretary to the party's advisory committees in 1920, and in 1927 head of the research department, a post which he held until 1943.

== Political career ==
Greenwood was first elected to the House of Commons at the 1922 general election for the constituency of Nelson and Colne in Lancashire. Greenwood was an active freemason, associated with the New Welcome Lodge.

In 1924, when the short-lived first Labour government was formed under Ramsay MacDonald, Greenwood was appointed as Parliamentary Secretary to the Ministry of Health, under John Wheatley, and he helped to draft the Wheatley Housing Act.

=== Minister of Health ===
In 1929, when Labour came to power again under MacDonald, Greenwood was appointed Minister of Health, remaining in the post until the collapse of the Labour government in August 1931; he was sworn into the Privy Council at the time of his appointment. During his period at the Ministry of Health, Greenwood raised widows' pensions and steered through the Housing Act 1930 which enacted large-scale slum clearance. During the crisis of 1931, Greenwood was one of the cabinet ministers who voted against making cuts in spending to balance the budget, the issue which led to the fall of the government. He lost his seat at the subsequent 1931 general election, but returned to Parliament the following year, winning a by-election in the Yorkshire constituency of Wakefield. Greenwood continued to represent Wakefield until his death in 1954.

=== Deputy Leader of the Labour Party ===
Greenwood drafted the Labour manifesto for the 1935 general election, during which he attacked Chancellor of the Exchequer Neville Chamberlain for spending money on rearmament, saying that the rearmament policy was "the merest scaremongering; disgraceful in a statesman of Mr Chamberlain's responsible position, to suggest that more millions of money needed to be spent on armaments." Greenwood stood in the subsequent Labour Party leadership election against Clement Attlee and Herbert Morrison, but came third. Instead he became Deputy Leader of the Labour Party, when Morrison refused to take up this position under Clement Attlee. He would hold this position until 1945.

Greenwood and Attlee forged a close and effective political relationship and worked well together; Attlee would later comment that Greenwood had given him “most loyal support and good counsel” in his autobiography.

On 2 September 1939, acting for Attlee who was in hospital for prostate surgery, he was called to respond to Neville Chamberlain's ambivalent speech on whether Britain would aid Poland. As he was about to speak, he was interrupted by an angry Conservative backbencher and former First Lord of the Admiralty, Leo Amery, who electrified the chamber when he exclaimed loud and clear: "Speak for England, Arthur!"

A flustered Greenwood proceeded to denounce Chamberlain's remarks, to the applause of both sides of the House, in a short speech for which he is best remembered.

I am gravely disturbed. An act of aggression took place thirty-eight hours ago. The moment that act of aggression took place one of the most important treaties of modern times automatically came into operation … I wonder how long we are prepared to vacillate at a time when Britain, and all that Britain stands for, and human civilisation are in peril. We must march with the French

— Arthur Greenwood, House of Commons, 2 September 1939,

==== Wartime government ====
In the opening months of World War II Greenwood played a central role in Labour's strategy of supporting the war effort but refusing to serve in a government under Chamberlain.

When the wartime coalition government was formed under Winston Churchill in May 1940, Greenwood was appointed to the War Cabinet as Minister without Portfolio. He was generally seen as ineffectual, but in May 1940 he emerged as Churchill's strongest and most vocal supporter in the lengthy War Cabinet debates on whether to accept or reject a peace offer from Germany. Without the vote in favour of fighting on by Greenwood and Clement Attlee, Churchill would not have had the slim majority he needed to do so.

He was given charge of the production council and economic policy, later being switched to reconstruction policy: In June 1941, Greenwood set up an Interdepartmental Committee on Social Insurance and Allied Services to look into the state of Britain's social welfare programmes, and see where improvements may be made. He appointed a Liberal, William Beveridge, chairman of the committee, who would go on to produce the landmark Beveridge Report which formed the basis for the postwar welfare state. Greenwood however was in decline by this time, judged by Churchill to be ineffective, he was sacked from the cabinet in February 1942.

From February 1942 until the end of World War II, Greenwood performed the function of Leader of the Opposition, though he did not receive the salary. In 1943, he was elected as Treasurer of the Labour Party, beating Herbert Morrison in a close contest.

=== Postwar ===
During the Attlee government, he served successively as Lord Privy Seal, Paymaster General and Minister without Portfolio. According to one historian, he was a major architect of both the National Health Service and the national insurance system through his chairmanship of the cabinet social services committee. In September 1947 Attlee sacked him from the cabinet in a reshuffle, on the basis that he wanted to bring in younger men.

He continued to be elected to positions in the Labour Party, retaining the post of Treasurer until 1954, and being elected as Chair of the National Executive Committee in 1952.

== Personal life ==
Greenwood married Catherine Ainsworth in 1904; they had one daughter and one son. His son Anthony Greenwood (later Lord Greenwood, 1911–1982) was an MP from 1946 until 1970, first for Heywood and Radcliffe and later for Rossendale, and served in Harold Wilson's governments.

=== Alcoholism ===
Greenwood was noted for his struggles with alcoholism. R. C. Whiting notes that by the mid-1920s "the drink problem emerged”, and that, by the mid-1930s his “regular drunkenness had now become firmly established”. Andrew Marr describes him as having fought “a lifelong battle with the bottle”. Roy Jenkins wrote that Greenwood had “as great a propensity to alcohol as Churchill himself, but he held it less well”. Ben Pimlott called him a "heavy and near-compulsive drinker".

During the war his drinking was sufficiently well known for Arthur Cecil Pigou to refer to him privately as “Lord Alcohol” and “Whisky Arthur”. David Owen notes that his drinking was absent or well controlled during the 1940 war cabinet crisis.

== Death ==
Greenwood died on 9 June 1954 at the age of 74, and was cremated at Golders Green Crematorium on 14 June 1954. His ashes and memorial lie in Bay 17 of the East Boundary Wall.

Parliament of the United Kingdom
Preceded by Robinson Graham	Member of Parliament for Nelson and Colne; 1922–1931	Succeeded by Linton Thorpe
Preceded by George Hillman	Member of Parliament for Wakefield; 1932–1954	Succeeded by Arthur Creech Jones
Political offices
Preceded by Neville Chamberlain	Minister of Health; 1929–1931	Succeeded by Neville Chamberlain
Preceded by The Lord Hankey	Minister without Portfolio; 1940–1942	Succeeded by Sir William Jowitt
Preceded by Frederick Pethick-Lawrence	Leader of the Opposition; 1942–1945	Succeeded by Clement Attlee
Preceded by The Lord Beaverbrook	Lord Privy Seal; 1945–1947	Succeeded by The Lord Inman
Preceded by Vacant	Paymaster General; 1946–1947	Succeeded by Hilary Marquand
Party political offices
Preceded by New position	Secretary of the Research Department of the Labour Party; 1927–1941	Succeeded by Morgan Phillips
Preceded by Clement Attlee	Deputy Leader of the Labour Party; 1935–1945	Succeeded by Herbert Morrison
Preceded by George Lathan	Treasurer of the Labour Party; 1943–1954	Succeeded by Hugh Gaitskell
Preceded by Harry Earnshaw	Chair of the Labour Party; 1952–1953	Succeeded by Wilfrid Burke
