= 1940 British war cabinet crisis =

Dispute within British government about whether to negotiate with Nazi Germany

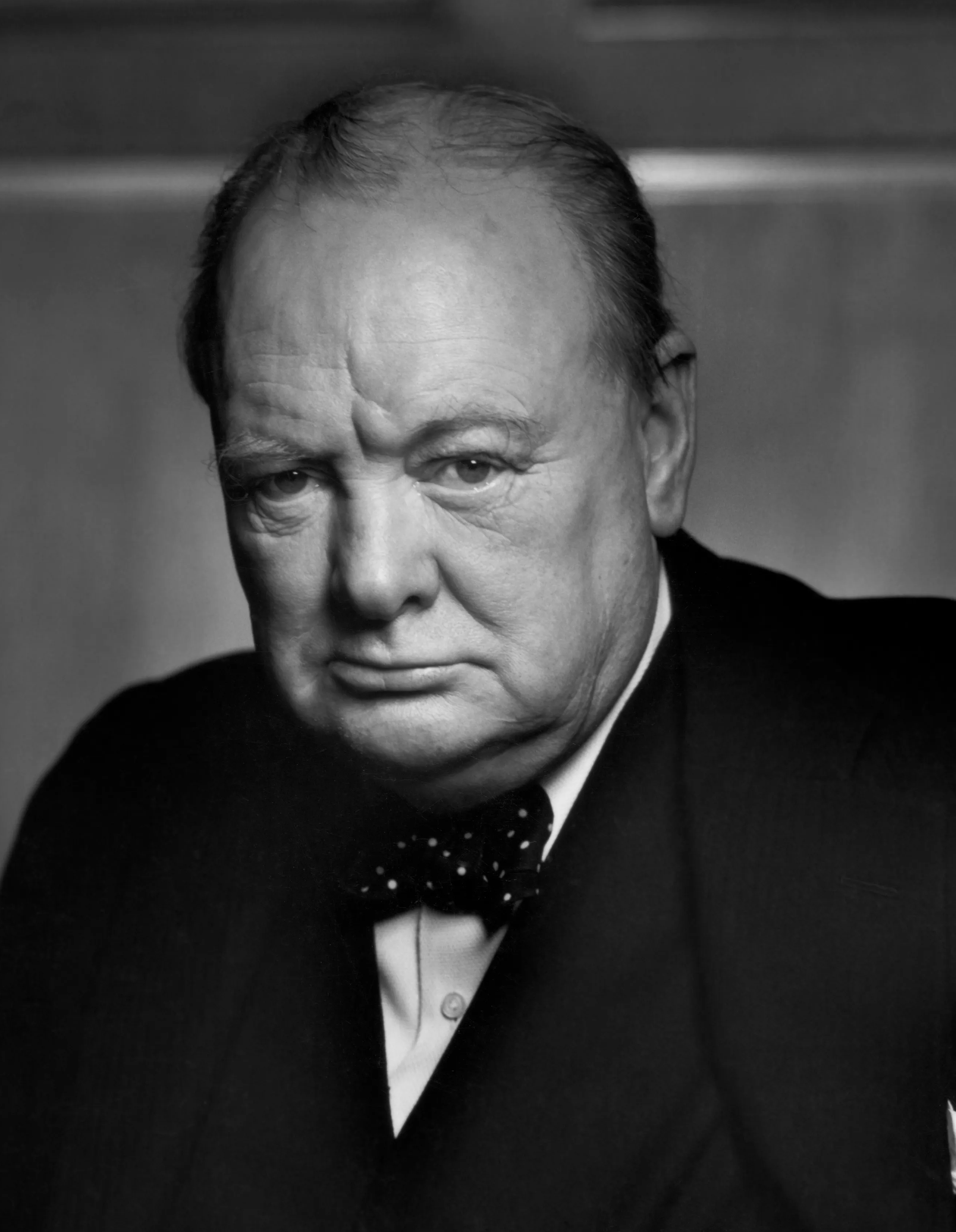
Winston Churchill
Prime Minister

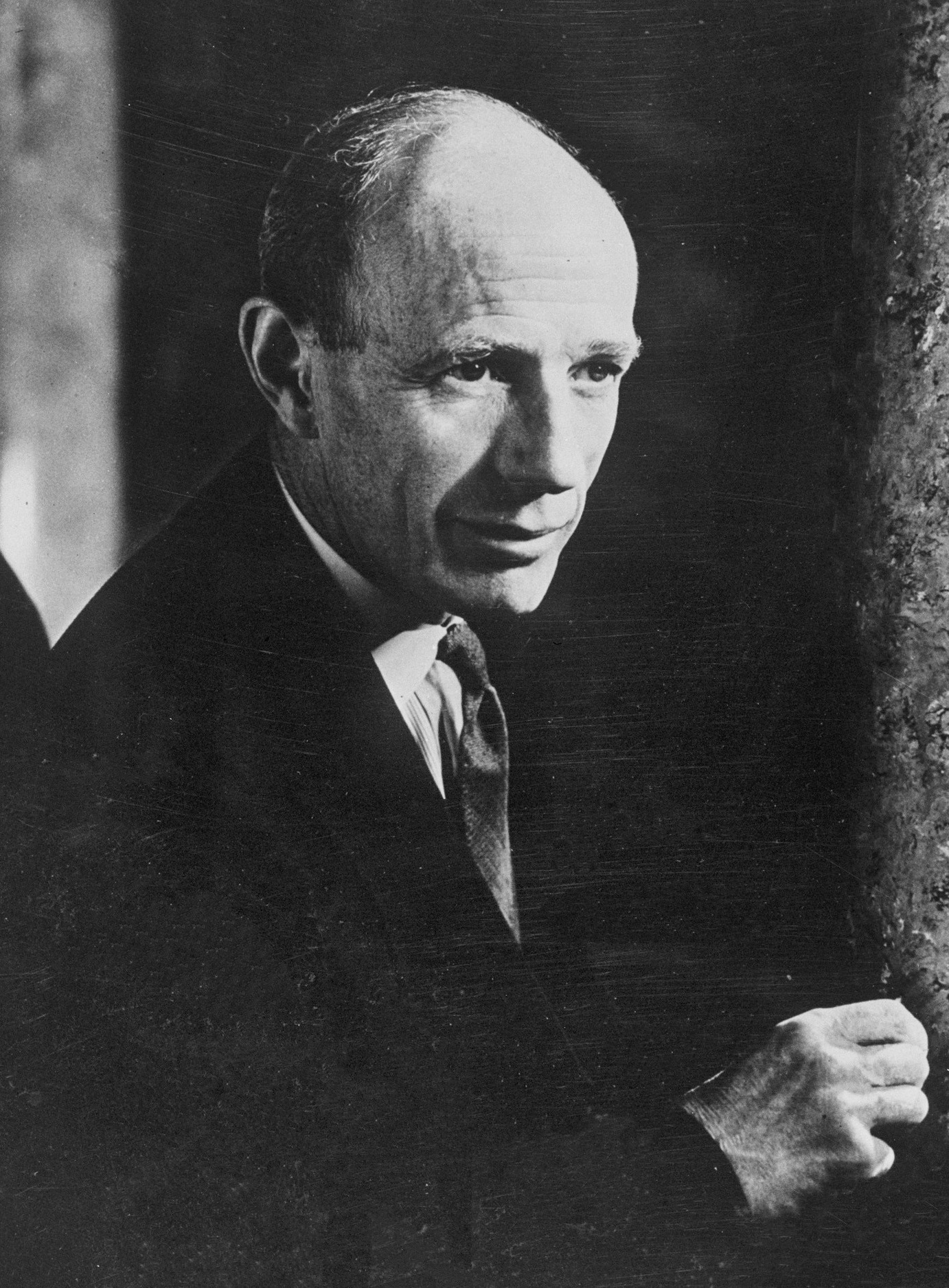
Lord Halifax
Foreign Secretary

In May 1940, during the Second World War, the British war cabinet was split over whether to discuss peace terms with Germany or to continue fighting. Opinion on the side of continuing with the war was led by the Prime Minister, Winston Churchill, while the side preferring negotiation was led by the Foreign Secretary, Lord Halifax. The disagreement escalated to crisis point and threatened to bring down the Churchill government.

With the British Expeditionary Force in retreat to Dunkirk, and the Fall of France seemingly imminent, Halifax believed that the government should explore the possibility of a negotiated peace settlement. His hope was that Hitler's ally, the still-neutral Italian dictator Mussolini, would broker an agreement. When a memorandum proposing this approach was discussed at the War Cabinet on 27 May, Churchill opposed it and urged his colleagues to fight on without negotiations. He was supported in the war cabinet by its two Labour Party members, Clement Attlee and Arthur Greenwood, and also by the Secretary of State for Air, Sir Archibald Sinclair, who as leader of the Liberal Party was co-opted to the war cabinet for its meetings about the proposed negotiations. Churchill's biggest problem was that he was not the leader of the Conservative Party and he needed to win the support of ex-Prime Minister Neville Chamberlain, without which he could have been forced to resign by the large Conservative majority in the House of Commons.

On 28 May, Churchill outmanoeuvred Halifax by calling a meeting of his 25-member outer cabinet, at which his resolve to fight on was unanimously supported. Halifax then accepted the rejection of his proposal, though he may have been more influenced by the loss of Chamberlain's support. There is a consensus among historians that Chamberlain's eventual support for Churchill was a critical turning point in the war.

== Background ==
=== Churchill becomes Prime Minister ===
Neville Chamberlain

The 1935 general election resulted in victory for the National Government (consisting principally of the Conservative Party, along with the Liberal National Party and the National Labour Organisation) by a substantial majority. Stanley Baldwin became prime minister. In May 1937, Baldwin retired and was succeeded by Neville Chamberlain who continued Baldwin's foreign policy of appeasement in the face of German, Italian and Japanese aggression. Having signed the Munich Agreement with Hitler in 1938, Chamberlain became alarmed by the dictator's continuing aggression and, in August 1939, signed the Anglo-Polish military alliance which guaranteed British support for Poland if attacked by Germany. When Germany did invade Poland, Chamberlain issued a declaration of war on 3 September 1939 and formed a war cabinet which included Winston Churchill (who had been out of office since June 1929) as First Lord of the Admiralty and Viscount Halifax as Foreign Secretary.

Dissatisfaction with Chamberlain's leadership became widespread in the spring of 1940 when Germany invaded Norway. On 7–8 May, the House of Commons debated the Norwegian campaign, which had gone badly for the Allies. The Norway Debate quickly escalated into fierce criticism of the Conservative-led government's conduct of the entire war. At the end of the second day, the opposition Labour Party forced a division, which amounted to a motion of no confidence in Chamberlain's leadership. Chamberlain as Prime Minister was heavily criticised on both sides of the House by members expressing a strong desire for national unity. The Conservative rebels mostly wanted the formation of a true national government which would include the opposition Labour and Liberal groups; the Liberal Nationals having essentially become part of the Conservative Party at this point, an arrangement that would be formalised after the war ended, and the National Labour group having had minimal influence in the government since the death of former prime minister Ramsay MacDonald. Churchill made the closing speech in the Norway Debate and mounted a strong defence of Chamberlain, ending his speech with these words:

At no time in the last war were we in greater peril than we are now, and I urge the House strongly to deal with these matters not in a precipitate vote, ill debated and on a widely discursive field, but in grave time and due time in accordance with the dignity of Parliament.

The government's notional majority was 213, but 41 members who normally supported the government voted with the Opposition, while an estimated 60 other Conservatives deliberately abstained. The government still won the vote by 281 to 200, but their majority was reduced to 81. This would normally be sustainable, but at a time of national crisis with Britain losing the war, it was a shattering blow for Chamberlain.

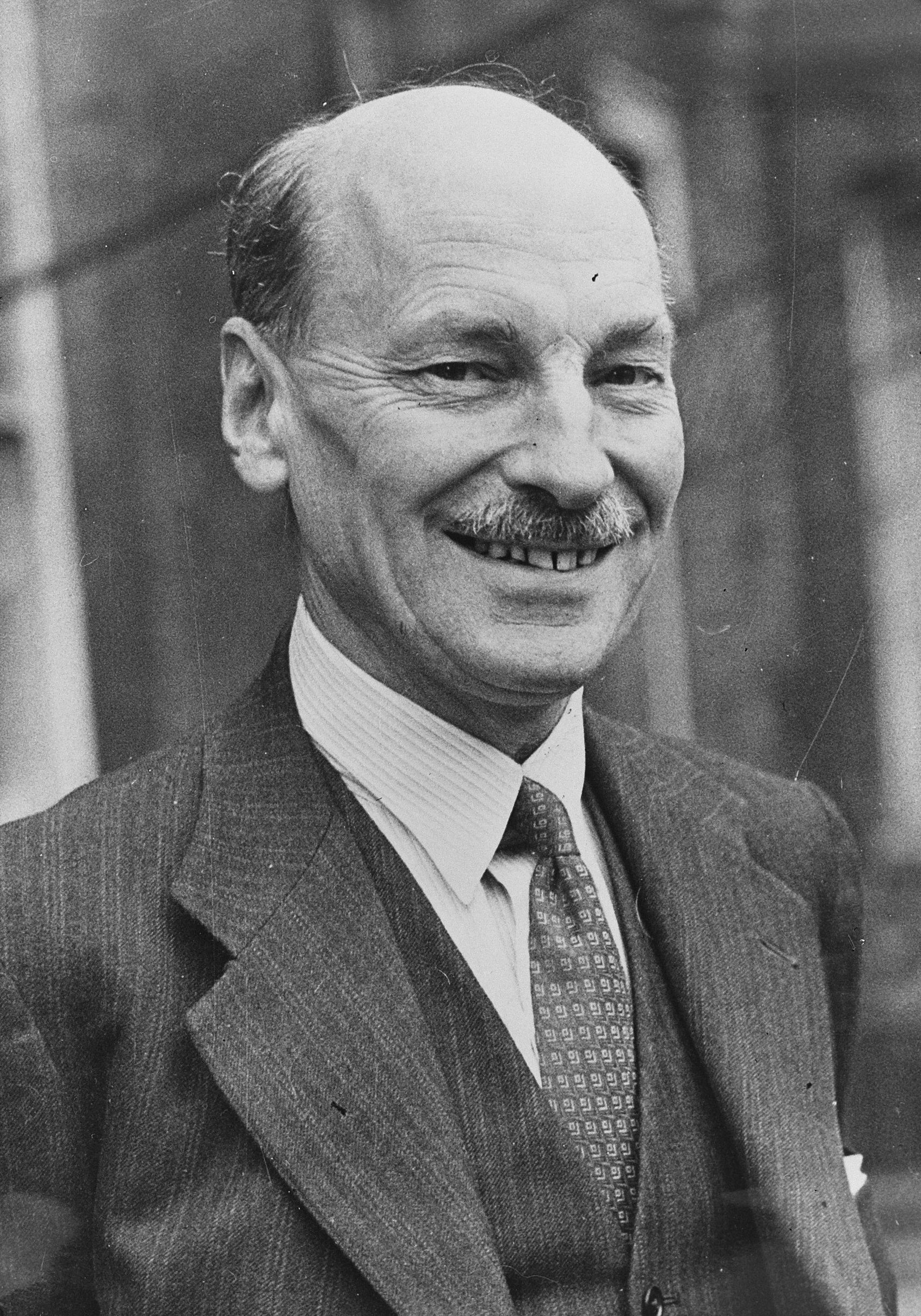
Clement Attlee

Next day, Thursday, 9 May, Chamberlain attempted to form a national coalition government. In talks at 10 Downing Street with Churchill and Halifax, Chamberlain indicated his willingness to resign if that was necessary for Labour to enter such a government. Labour leader Clement Attlee and his deputy Arthur Greenwood then joined the meeting and, when asked if they would serve in a coalition, they said they must first consult their party's National Executive Committee, who were then in Bournemouth preparing for the annual party conference that was to start the following Monday. Even so, they indicated that it was unlikely they could serve in a government led by Chamberlain; they probably would be able to serve under another Conservative. They agreed to telephone Chamberlain on Friday afternoon with the result of their consultation.

Earlier on Thursday, Chamberlain had met Halifax alone and had tried to persuade him to be his successor. Halifax would probably have been the Conservative Party's preferred candidate. Halifax replied that, as a peer and not therefore a member of the Commons, he would be seriously disadvantaged as Prime Minister and would have to delegate direction of the war effort to Churchill in the Commons. He did not change his position when the same question arose at the evening meeting in which Chamberlain and Halifax were joined by Churchill and the party's Chief Whip, David Margesson. Churchill's own account of these events, written six years later, is not accurate. It describes the events of 9 May as taking place the following day, and the description of Chamberlain attempting to persuade him to agree tacitly to Halifax's appointment as Prime Minister does not tally with Halifax having expressed his reluctance to do so at the morning meeting with Chamberlain.

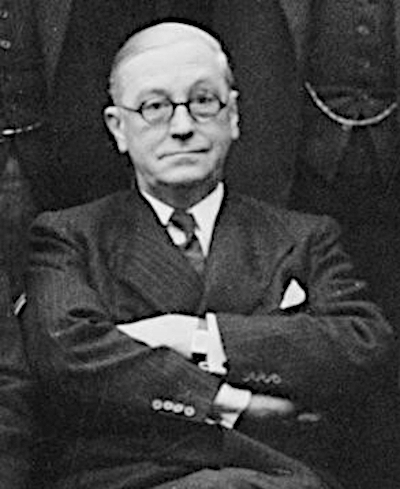
Arthur Greenwood

The Wehrmacht launched its blitzkrieg against western Europe on the morning of Friday, 10 May, by invading Belgium, Luxembourg and the Netherlands. Given this new crisis, Chamberlain at first declared that he would not resign, but he decided after all to await the Labour Party's decision, which he did not receive until late afternoon. Attlee telephoned Downing Street at about 4:45 pm to confirm that Labour would join a coalition government, but not under Chamberlain's leadership. Accordingly, Chamberlain went to Buckingham Palace, where he had an audience of George VI at 6:00 pm. He tendered his resignation and, after the King asked him who should be his successor, recommended Churchill. The King sent for Churchill, who agreed to form a coalition government; the public announcement was made by Chamberlain on BBC Radio at 9:00 pm.

On Saturday, 11 May, the Labour Party agreed to join the national government under Churchill's leadership, and he was able to form his war cabinet which, at the outset, was restricted to five members, with himself as Prime Minister and Minister of Defence. Attlee relinquished his official role as Leader of the Opposition to become Lord Privy Seal (until 19 February 1942 when he was appointed deputy prime minister) and Greenwood was appointed a Minister without Portfolio. The main problem for Churchill as he became Prime Minister was that he was not the leader of the Conservative Party, and so he was obliged to include Chamberlain in the war cabinet, as Lord President of the Council, and to retain Halifax as Foreign Secretary. The war cabinet was augmented by the three service ministers who attended most of its meetings; these were Churchill appointees on whose support he could generally rely. Anthony Eden became Secretary of State for War, Labour's A. V. Alexander succeeded Churchill as First Lord of the Admiralty and the leader of the Liberal Party, Sir Archibald Sinclair, became Secretary of State for Air.

=== War situation to Friday, 24 May ===
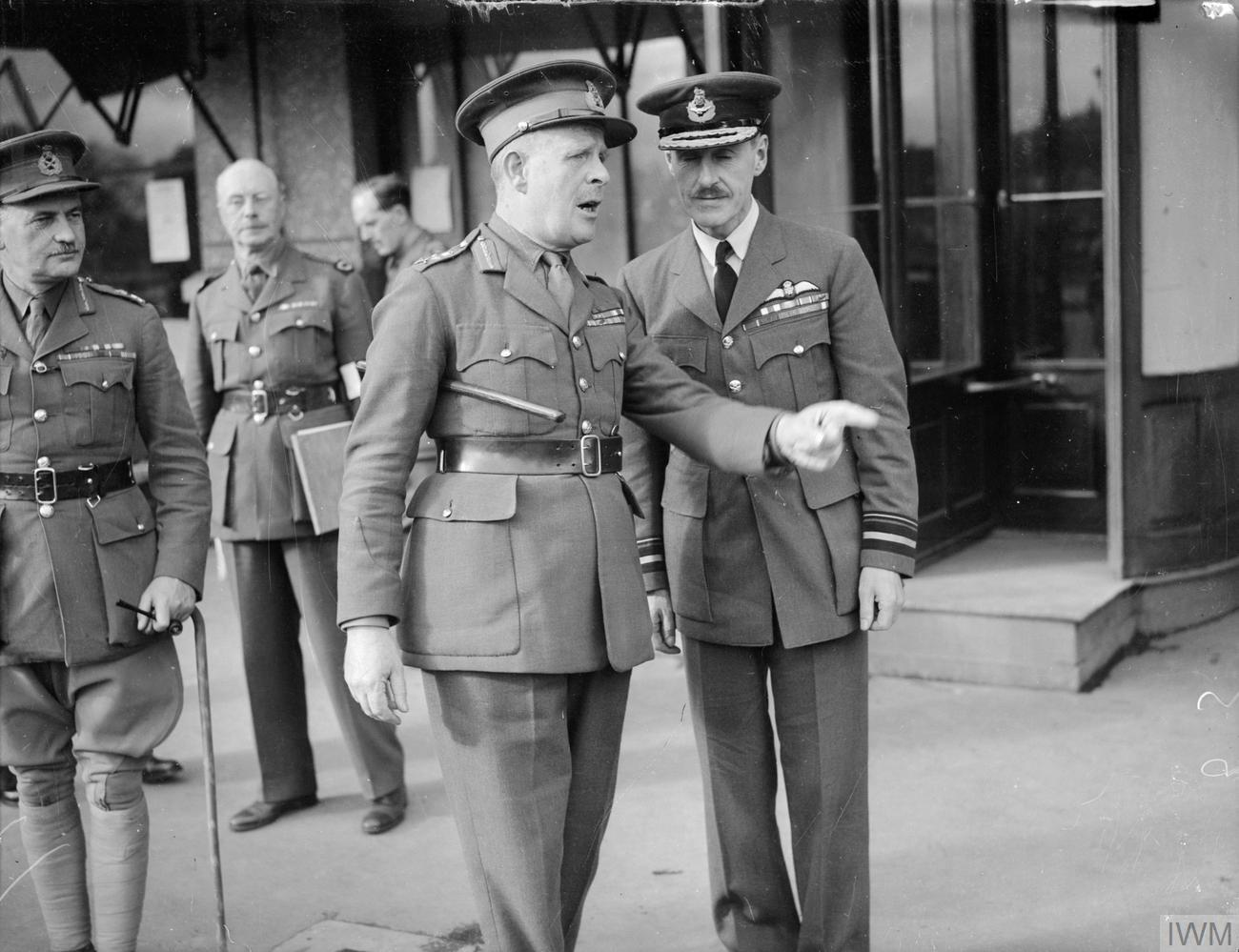
Lord Gort (gesturing, at centre) was the commander-in-chief of the BEF.

By 21 May, German tanks were approaching Boulogne-sur-Mer. John Colville in his diary entry that day said preparations for the evacuation of the British Expeditionary Force (BEF) were being made in case of necessity. An estimated 400,000 Allied servicemen, mostly of the BEF with elements of the French First Army, had retreated into the coastal area. Their hopes rested mostly on the success of the Weygand Plan, a proposed counter-offensive by themselves in conjunction with a strike from the south by the main French forces. This did not come to fruition and the BEF commander, Lord Gort, decided that evacuation was the only option. During 23 and 24 May, the Royal Navy evacuated an estimated 4,365 servicemen from Boulogne.

At a war cabinet meeting on the morning of Friday the 24th, Churchill reported that there were large numbers of French troops in Dunkirk but as yet no British servicemen other than a few specialist units. He had been advised that the port was functioning well with supplies being unloaded. There was a proposal to send Canadian troops to Dunkirk but this was pending developments in the wider theatre.

The war cabinet's interest in Italy on 24 May was limited to keeping it out of the war, or at least delaying its entry. Halifax presented a telegram from the French government which suggested an approach to the Italian dictator Mussolini by U.S. President Franklin D. Roosevelt, assuming he was willing to co-operate, for the purpose of enquiring what Mussolini's grievances were in order to have these discussed by all concerned before any resort to military action. Halifax was not confident that anything would come of the French idea but he said he would support it on condition that the approach was presented to Mussolini as a personal initiative by Roosevelt.

On the morning of 24 May, Hitler, having consulted General von Rundstedt, ordered the Panzers to halt their advance. This has been seen as one of the key decisions of the war as it gave the British extra time that they desperately needed to evacuate their servicemen from Dunkirk. Some of the German commanders disagreed with it and, a week later, General von Bock wrote in his diary that "when we do finally reach Dunkirk, the English will all be gone".

=== Events of Saturday, 25 May ===
The war cabinet met in Downing Street at 11:30 am. Halifax confirmed that he had replied to the French government about their idea of persuading Roosevelt to approach Mussolini. Halifax also reported on a discussion between Sir Robert Vansittart and an unnamed Italian diplomat, although he understood the approach to be unofficial.

Boulogne surrendered on the afternoon of 25 May and the 10th Panzer Division led the German attack on Calais with support from the Luftwaffe. Dunkirk was the only available port for evacuation. With the BEF and its allies in retreat and Lord Gort warning them of impending disaster, the war cabinet had to consider the consequences of French defeat. Gort predicted the loss of all equipment and doubted that more than a small percentage of servicemen could be evacuated.

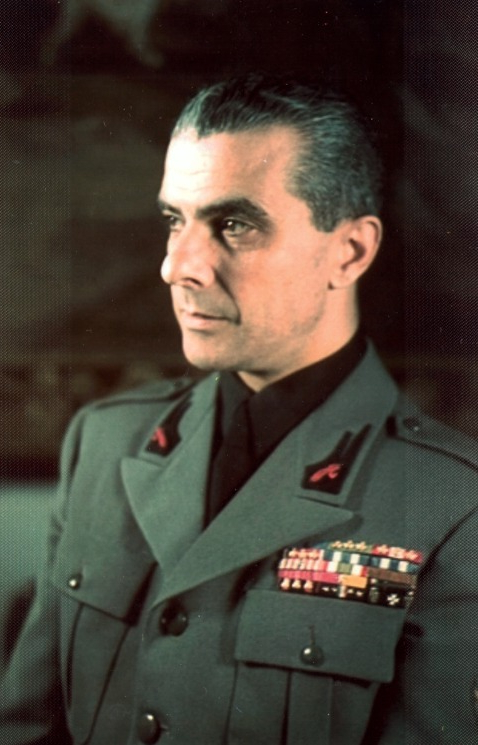
Giuseppe Bastianini, Italian ambassador to London

The war cabinet had already commissioned a report called British Strategy in a Certain Eventuality, drafted by the Chiefs of Staff (CoS). The report concluded that resistance to the Wehrmacht would be impossible if they gained a secure foothold in Britain: with the bulk of the army stranded in France, the home-based forces and civil defence would be inadequate. The CoS held that air defence was crucial and that the United Kingdom could not survive if Germany gained control of the air, although the Royal Navy would at least provide some breathing space. It had been calculated that Germany's air superiority was about four to one and it was vital that the British war effort must concentrate primarily on the production of fighter aircraft and crews, and the defence of those factories essential to fighter production should have priority.

The report had two main conclusions. One was that the United Kingdom could probably resist invasion if the RAF and the Royal Navy remained intact and this became a key point in Churchill's argument, against Halifax, that the country should fight on without negotiation. The other was that, ultimately, Britain could not hope to win the war without American assistance.

Late in the afternoon of 25 May, Halifax met Giuseppe Bastianini, the Italian ambassador to the UK. Halifax sent an account of the meeting to the British Ambassador in Rome, Sir Percy Loraine. It included a statement by Halifax that "matters which cause anxiety to Italy must certainly be discussed as part of the general European settlement". This was presented to the war cabinet next day.

At this stage, France and Britain wanted to keep Italy out of the war, but Halifax wanted to use Mussolini as a mediator to secure a peace that would, while giving Hitler almost complete control of continental Europe, ensure the autonomy and security of Great Britain and its empire. In his biography of Churchill, Roy Jenkins says this would have been the equivalent of a second Munich twenty months after the first. In Jenkins' opinion, Halifax thought of himself as a realist but, in reality, his views chimed with his profound Christian pessimism. His service as the head of an aggressive power in India could also have shaped his views, finding himself now in the place of an aggressee. The key factor was that this negative outlook deprived him of Churchill's indomitable courage. Jenkins says Halifax was probably content to have England left alone, in the same way as Spain or Switzerland or Sweden. He could not understand that such a prospect was repugnant to Churchill and so conflict between the two was inevitable.

At 10:00 pm, Churchill chaired a defence committee meeting at Admiralty House in which he directed that a war cabinet meeting should be held at 9:00 am the next morning. The minutes of the defence committee meeting included an order to Gort that he should march north to the coast (i.e., to Dunkirk) in battle order and to strike at all forces between himself and the sea with the assistance of General Georges Blanchard, commander of the French First Army, and the Belgians. Churchill also decreed that a plan (Operation Dynamo) should be formulated by the Royal Navy to prepare all possible means of re-embarkation from the ports and beaches. The RAF were directed to dominate the air above the area involved.

== War cabinet meetings – 26 to 28 May ==
Over these three days, seven top secret ministerial meetings (including two that were adjourned and reconvened) were held at Downing Street, Admiralty House or in the Prime Minister's office at the House of Commons. In the meetings, the Cabinet Secretary, Sir Edward Bridges was always present when minutes were to be taken. He was sometimes assisted by other civil servants or military experts. Minutes from all war cabinet meetings in May and June are held in The National Archives. (Note: The minutes are within volumes CAB–65–7 and CAB–65–13 where they are classified as WM 109 (40) to WM 188 (40). The files for 26 to 28 May are nos 139–145 (those for the two reconvened meetings are nos 140 and 145). "WM" means War Cabinet Minutes (September 1939 to May 1945); it contrasts with "CM" which means (peacetime) Cabinet Minutes.)

The war cabinet and service ministers were usually joined by the CoS who were Admiral Sir Dudley Pound, the First Sea Lord; Air Marshal Sir Cyril Newall, the Chief of the Air Staff; and the Chief of the Imperial General Staff (CIGS). The office of CIGS changed hands on 27 May when, as desired by Churchill, Field Marshal Sir Edmund Ironside was replaced by his deputy Field Marshal Sir John Dill. Ironside became Commander-in-Chief, Home Forces. Others who often took part included the Home Secretary, Sir John Anderson; the Permanent Under-Secretary of State for Foreign Affairs, Sir Alexander Cadogan; the Secretary of State for Dominion Affairs, Viscount Caldecote; and the Minister of Information, Duff Cooper.

At this stage of the war, Churchill's position as Prime Minister was still precarious. Chamberlain remained the leader of the Conservative Party which had a massive Commons majority and Halifax was, almost certainly, the preferred establishment choice to be Chamberlain's successor. Churchill could not, therefore, afford to have both Chamberlain and Halifax aligned against him. Given that the other two members of the war cabinet were long-time political opponents from the Labour Party, Churchill was by no means certain of an adequate majority within his own cabinet. Attlee became a more or less silent supporter who listened rather than spoke, but Greenwood asserted himself resolutely as a supporter of Churchill's fight on policy.

Churchill therefore had a slender majority in the war cabinet, but so much depended on Chamberlain who was always somewhere between Churchill and Halifax. Churchill decided to invite Sinclair to attend the war cabinet after the Sunday meetings. His argument was that Sinclair as leader of the Liberal Party should have a say, but in fact Sinclair was an old friend on whose support he could rely. Even with a four to two majority around the table, Churchill could not risk both Chamberlain and Halifax resigning as that would bring the Conservative majority into the equation and, almost certainly, an appeasement government like the one that would soon surrender in France. He had to tread very carefully, therefore, until he could believe in Chamberlain's eventual resolve.

=== Sunday, 26 May ===
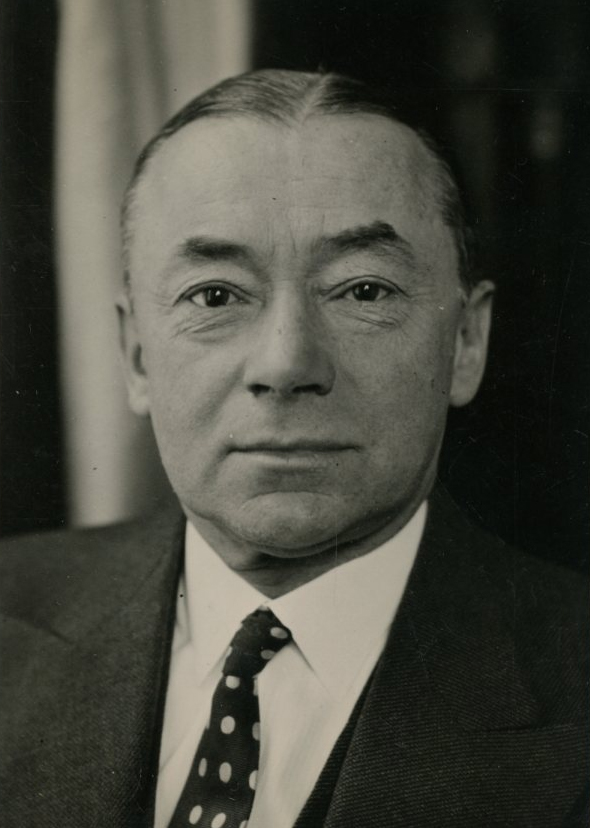
French premier Paul Reynaud visited London on 26 May.

French premier Paul Reynaud was in London for much of Sunday and had a working lunch with Churchill between two war cabinet meetings, followed by a meeting with Halifax at about 3:15 pm. The war cabinet met at 9:00 am and 2:00 pm (both at Downing Street). The second one was adjourned so that, first, Halifax and then the rest of the war cabinet could meet Reynaud at Admiralty House. The war cabinet reconvened there at about 5:00 pm, following Reynaud's departure.

==== First session ====
Churchill opened the meeting by briefing his colleagues on the Saturday night defence committee meeting and informing them of Reynaud's visit later on Sunday. He explained that, because of communication difficulties, the French high command had not known of Gort's decision that the BEF must retreat to Dunkirk and await evacuation. Churchill said that General Maxime Weygand was now aware and had accepted the situation. Weygand had instructed Blanchard to use his own discretion in supporting the retreat and evacuation as there was no longer any possibility of making a counter-attack to the south, especially as the French First Army had lost all its heavy guns and armoured vehicles. Churchill anticipated the total collapse of France and feared that Reynaud was coming to London to confirm it. As a result, evacuation of the BEF was now the government's first priority and, hence, the conclusions reached on Saturday night and transmitted to Gort.

Churchill remained optimistic and expressed an opinion that there was "a good chance of getting off a considerable proportion of the BEF" and that he would make every endeavour to persuade Reynaud to fight on. At this time, he did not know Reynaud's plans for the day and provisionally arranged another war cabinet meeting at 2:00 pm.

Even so, in the interest of being prepared to meet all eventualities, Churchill had asked the Chiefs of Staff (CoS) to consider the situation which would arise if the French did surrender, on the following terms of reference:

In the event of France being unable to continue in the war and becoming neutral, with the Germans holding their present position, and the Belgian army being forced to capitulate after assisting the British Expeditionary Force to reach the coast; in the event of terms being offered to Britain which would place her entirely at the mercy of Germany through disarmament, cession of naval bases in the Orkneys, etc; what are the prospects of our continuing the war alone against Germany and probably Italy. Can the Navy and the Air Force hold out reasonable hopes of preventing serious invasion, and could the forces gathered in this Island cope with raids from the air involving detachments not greater than 10,000 men; it being observed that a prolongation of British resistance might be very dangerous for Germany engaged in holding down the greater part of Europe.

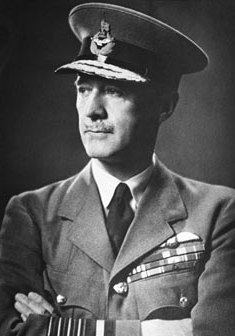
Sir Cyril Newall (a later photo, showing him as a Marshal of the Royal Air Force)

Newall reminded the cabinet that the CoS had written British Strategy in a Certain Eventuality (paper no. CoS (40) 390), completed on 25 May and now to be reviewed in the light of the new terms of reference set out by the Prime Minister. This was achieved by British Strategy in the Near Future (paper no. CoS (40) 397), completed late on 26 May and presented to the war cabinet the next day. It was supplemented by paper no. WCP (40) 171, written by Greenwood on 26 May and discussing the economic aspects of the problem.

There followed a brief discussion among the CoS about the defence of Calais and then, for the first time, Halifax raised the subject of Italian mediation by stating his opinion that "on the broader issue, we (the government) must face the fact that it is not so much now a question of imposing a complete defeat upon Germany but of safeguarding the independence of our own Empire and if possible that of France".

He proceeded to give a report of his conversation with Bastianini who had requested a conference on the peace and security of Europe. According to Bastianini, it was Mussolini's principal wish to secure peace in Europe. Halifax had answered this by saying "we should naturally be prepared to consider any proposals which might lead to this, provided our liberty and independence were assured". He confirmed that the French had been informed of the Italian approach and that Bastianini had requested a second interview that day. Churchill replied that:

Peace and security might be achieved under a German domination of Europe. That we could never accept. We must ensure our complete liberty and independence. We must oppose any negotiations which might lead to a derogation of our rights and power.

Chamberlain predicted that Italy would soon issue an ultimatum to France and then come in on Germany's side. Attlee pointed out that Mussolini would be very nervous of Germany emerging as the predominant power in Europe. Halifax was convinced that Great Britain was not strong enough to face Hitler alone, given that France was about to capitulate and there was no prospect of help from America.

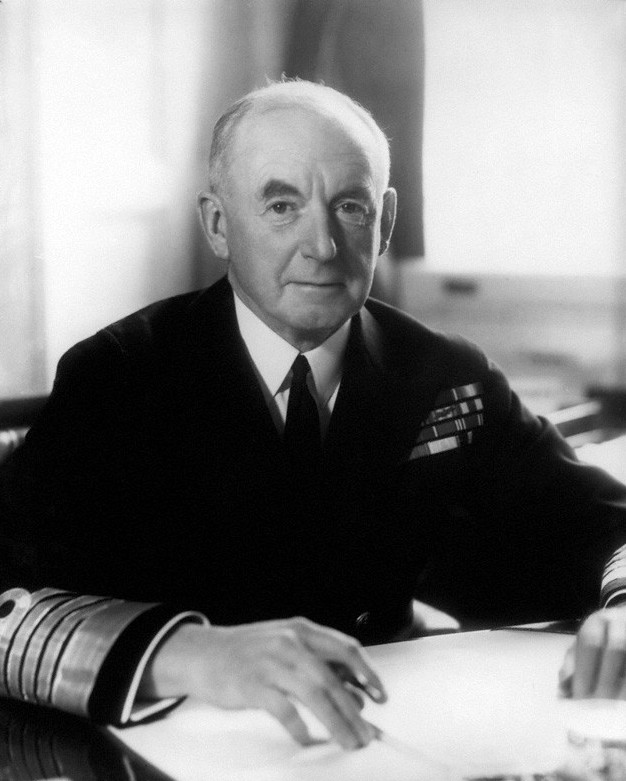
Admiral of the Fleet Sir Dudley Pound

Soon after this, an aide-memoire (paper no. CoS (40) 391) was distributed by the CoS. Entitled Visit of M. Reynaud on 26th May, 1940 and signed jointly by Ironside, Newall and Pound, it anticipated the eventuality that Reynaud would announce the intention of France to make a separate peace. It firstly presented arguments to deter the French from capitulation and stressed that even if the French had decided to capitulate, "we shall continue the fight single-handed". It went on to promise drastic measures, including blockade and the bombing of French cities, to be taken against France if occupied by German forces. The most immediate recommendations were to demand French assistance in the evacuation of the BEF and the transfer of all French naval vessels and military aircraft to British ports and bases. There was only a single mention of Italy to the effect that it would certainly exploit the situation to its advantage and satisfy its claims against France.

The war cabinet expressed several views on the content of the paper. Halifax displayed a lack of understanding when he said that Great Britain could not fight alone without first establishing and then maintaining complete air superiority over Germany. Newall corrected him as the report had not said that. Instead, it was necessary to prevent Germany from achieving complete air superiority as that would enable them to invade England. Sinclair doubted Germany's ability to maintain the oil supplies necessary for a prolonged air war. Newall told Halifax that his issue was out of scope as this memoire was focused on French capitulation. Strategic questions would be discussed in the second report for which Churchill had presented terms of reference earlier.

The meeting ended with the war cabinet approving the instructions given to Gort by the defence committee that he should retreat to Dunkirk in full battle order. A fleet of ships and small boats would be assembled for the evacuation. The forces in Calais were to hold out for as long as possible. The CoS would prepare a supplement to their report, based on Churchill's terms of reference.

==== Second session ====
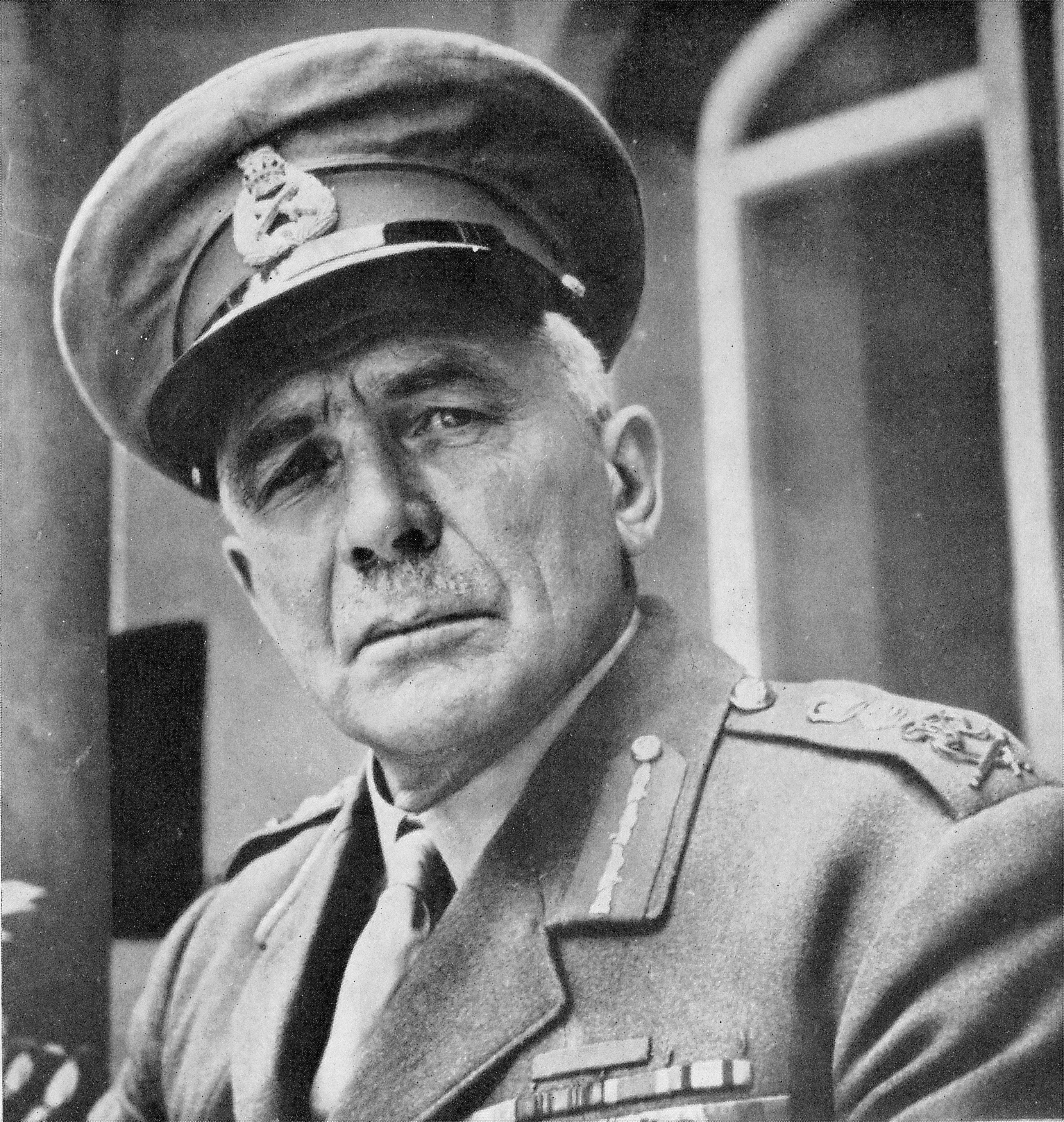
Field Marshal Sir Edmund Ironside was CIGS until 27 May.

Apart from the docks, where a British contingent held on until Monday morning, the town of Calais was taken by the Wehrmacht on Sunday afternoon. Although Calais was a hopeless defence, it nevertheless slowed the coastal advance of the 10th Panzer Division towards Dunkirk, to which the Allied forces were already retreating.

The war cabinet resumed its deliberations at 2:00 pm. Churchill began by describing his lunchtime meeting with Reynaud, who had stated that the French military situation was desperate but that he had no intention of signing a separate peace treaty with Germany. The problem was that he might be forced to resign as he believed there were others in the French government, principally Marshal Pétain, who would call for an armistice. Reynaud dismissed Churchill's fear that Germany would try for an early invasion of England and said they would strike for Paris, which they did as soon as they captured Dunkirk.

Churchill told Reynaud that the United Kingdom was not prepared to give in on any account and would rather go down fighting than be enslaved to Germany. He added that he had confidence in the British armed forces to survive a German onslaught but, he warned, France must stay in the war. Reynaud confirmed that no terms had yet been offered by Germany.

Having briefed the war cabinet on his own discussion with Reynaud, Churchill suggested that Halifax should go over to Admiralty House and meet Reynaud himself. The others would join them shortly. Before Halifax left, there was another brief discussion about Italy. Reynaud had told Churchill that he wanted to keep Italy out of the war so that ten French divisions on the Italian border could be released to fight the Germans. Reynaud was worried about the sort of terms Italy would require as France would certainly have to cede territory. Halifax said he believed an approach must be made to Italy. He had faith in Mussolini to persuade Hitler to take a more reasonable attitude. Churchill replied that he did not think anything would come of an approach to Mussolini, though he did agree that it was a matter for the war cabinet to discuss further. For the moment, Churchill's sole concern was that the French must provide as much assistance as possible in the evacuation of the BEF. Although it is not entirely clear from the minutes, it would seem that the Downing Street session ended now (probably before 3:00 pm) with, first, Halifax and later the other four members going to Admiralty House (a five-minute walk) to see Reynaud.

Churchill had to treat Halifax carefully until he was more sure of Chamberlain's views. He could not risk a direct conflict with Halifax while his own position in the Conservative party was insecure, because Halifax had strong support in the party. Fortunately for Churchill, Chamberlain never trusted Mussolini and did not want him involved in any negotiations. Chamberlain's main concern through the three days was that the French must be mollified and encouraged to stay in the war, so he was very cautious about refusing any requests by Reynaud, even one he disagreed with. There is a view that Chamberlain had warmed to Churchill and wanted to support him, in spite of past antagonism over appeasement, because Churchill had treated him with great respect and affection since inviting him to join the war cabinet.

==== Third session ====
Following Reynaud's departure, the war cabinet held another meeting in Admiralty House. The cabinet papers do not cover the first fifteen minutes as the Cabinet Secretary was not present to take minutes. The cabinet papers indicate that this session was in fact a continuation of the 2:00 pm one by including both under the same heading. It seems to have lasted about an hour from 5:00 pm till 6:00 pm as, in effect, the third Sunday meeting. The minutes confirm that the service ministers were not present.

In the minutes, Churchill began by comparing the United Kingdom's military status with that of France. We, he said, still had powers of resistance and attack, which France did not. If France could not defend herself, he asserted, it was better that she should get out of the war rather than drag Great Britain into a settlement which involved intolerable terms. Attlee and Chamberlain both suggested that Hitler had a schedule and that he must win the war before winter. Attlee emphasised the importance of keeping France in the war so that Hitler could not turn on Britain in 1940.

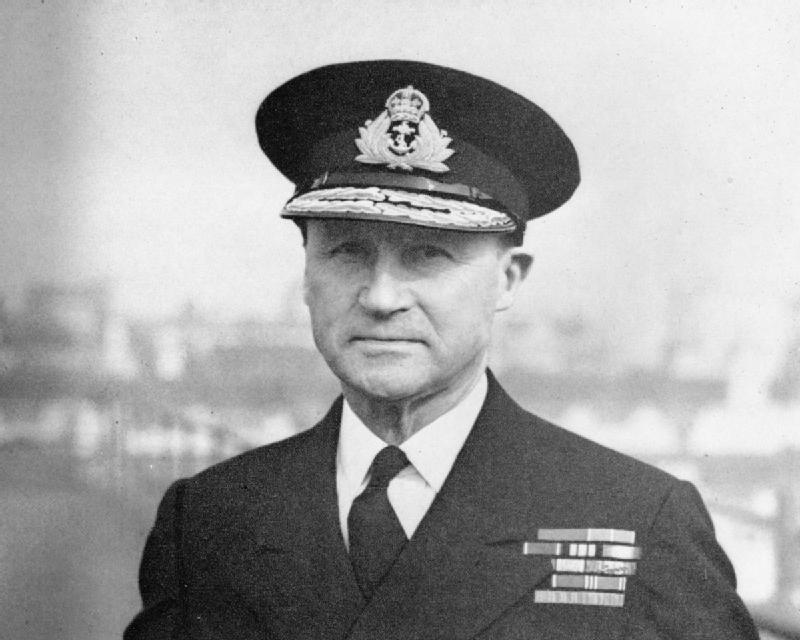
Admiral Sir Bertram Ramsay initiated Operation Dynamo.

Churchill replied that he wanted France to hang on but stressed that the United Kingdom must not be forced into the weak position of seeking negotiation before engaging in any serious fighting. Halifax now openly disagreed with Churchill by saying that he attached "rather more importance than the Prime Minister to the desirability of allowing France to try out the possibilities of European equilibrium". He went on to say that it was important to reason with Mussolini about the balance of power in Europe and that Britain might then consider Italian claims. Greenwood pointed out that it was not within Mussolini's power to take a line independent of Hitler and Chamberlain added that Mussolini could only take an independent line if Hitler allowed him to do so. Chamberlain added that the problem was a difficult one and every point of view must be discussed.

Having listened to Chamberlain, who was still somewhere between himself and Halifax, Churchill suggested that nothing should be decided about future conduct of the war, including any negotiated settlement, until the evacuation of the BEF from Dunkirk was completed. While he acknowledged that Operation Dynamo might fail, he was optimistic that a significant portion of the BEF would be saved, but much depended on air superiority. The war cabinet decided that Halifax must write, for discussion on Monday, the draft of a communication to Italy (this was circulated as paper no. WP (40) 170), together with a record of his latest meeting with Bastianini. It was also agreed, at Churchill's suggestion or insistence, that Sinclair should become a de facto member of the war cabinet ahead of future discussions about Italy. While Churchill may already have gained the support of the two Labour members, he needed Sinclair as Liberal Party leader to strengthen his position.

Sometime after 6:00 pm, Churchill telephoned Vice-Admiral Ramsay in Dover to give the go-ahead for Dynamo to begin. At 6:57 pm, Ramsay sent the signal which initiated Dynamo, though with evacuation in some form already having taken place over the last four days, it is difficult to differentiate between the work of Dynamo and the work that preceded it.

=== Monday, 27 May ===
The Calais docks finally fell on the morning of Monday the 27th. Throughout the day, a total of 7,669 servicemen were evacuated from Dunkirk harbour but none as yet from the beaches. The war cabinet held three meetings at 11:30 am, 4:30 pm and 10:00 pm.

==== 11:30 am meeting ====
The minutes from the 11:30 am meeting are the longest taken at any of the war cabinet meetings between 24 and 29 May (there are 28 pages in one volume and seven in the other). Even so, there is no mention at all of negotiations with Italy. The meeting was mostly about military strategy and Halifax was only involved in questions about Belgium, Iceland, the US and the USSR. Mussolini is briefly mentioned once in the context of when he might declare war on Great Britain and France. An issue had been raised by Stanley Bruce, the Australian High Commissioner, and Chamberlain had told Bruce (whom the war cabinet considered a defeatist) that he expected Mussolini to intervene as soon as Paris fell (in fact, Mussolini's declaration came on 10 June, four days before Paris was taken).

==== 4:30 pm meeting ====
Italy was the key subject under discussion at the 4:30 pm meeting when the war cabinet discussed a memorandum prepared by Halifax to propose an approach to Mussolini. Those present were the five war cabinet members with Sinclair, Cadogan and Bridges.

The memorandum was drafted in response to Reynaud's visit in which he asked the British government to join him in making an approach to Mussolini. The suggested terms, broadly, were that Mussolini must be advised of the situation he would face if Germany established domination of Europe and that the allies would include Italy in settlement of all European issues, especially any geographical questions in which Mussolini was primarily interested. The memo went on to recommend an initiative by Roosevelt, to be jointly requested by Great Britain and France, in which he would seek to involve Italian participation in a peace conference with a view to understanding Italian issues and seeking to resolve them. Halifax was forced to add that since drafting the memorandum he had been advised by the British ambassador in Rome of Mussolini's resentment towards Roosevelt's earlier communication, deriding it as an unwarranted interference in Italy's affairs.

Churchill began the discussion by saying that there was an enormous difference between a direct approach to Mussolini and an indirect one via Roosevelt, even if ostensibly on his own initiative. Chamberlain spoke at length about the pros and cons but concluded that the French plan would serve no useful purpose as he expected Italy to join the war in any event so that, as he put it, Mussolini would get a share of the spoils.

Sinclair now spoke and said he completely opposed any direct approach to Mussolini but would await the result of Roosevelt's intervention. His concern was the damage to national morale that would be caused if the government did anything that could be perceived as weakness. Attlee agreed with him and added that Mussolini would never be satisfied with anything offered to him and would at once ask for more. Greenwood went further, saying that he had given up hope of France getting out of its difficulty. Given the progress being made by Germany, there would not be time to complete any negotiations before France fell. Greenwood insisted that it would be disastrous to approach Mussolini.

Churchill spoke again and firmly dismissed an approach to Mussolini as futile, dangerous and ruinous to the integrity of Britain's fighting position. Reynaud, he said, would be best advised to make a firm stand. Churchill asserted that Britain must not be dragged down the slippery slope with France. The best help that Britain could give to France was to assure them that, whatever happened, Britain was going to fight it out to the end. He was concerned about the country's loss of prestige and said the only way to recover it was by showing the world that Germany had not won the war. If the worst came to the worst, he concluded, it would not be a bad thing for this country to go down fighting for the other countries which had been overcome by Nazi tyranny.

Chamberlain did not agree with the French proposal but he suggested that an outright refusal might not be wise while efforts were being made to persuade France to fight on. In any case, he added, for Britain and France to "barge in on our own" after getting Roosevelt involved would probably alienate Roosevelt.

Halifax agreed with Chamberlain and said he was completely in favour of getting France to fight on to the end, but he resented the suggestion that his approach amounted to suing for peace. He challenged Churchill on his apparent change of mind during the last 24 hours. On Sunday, Halifax had understood Churchill to say he was prepared to discuss any offer of terms but, today, Churchill was defiantly saying that no course was open except fighting to a finish. Halifax accepted that the point was probably academic, because he did not believe any acceptable offer would come from Hitler, but while it was still possible to obtain an acceptable settlement, he could not agree with Churchill's stated intention.

Churchill said he would not join France in requesting terms but that he would consider any offer they received. Chamberlain said there would be no difficulty in deciding if an offer should be considered or not. Greenwood asked Halifax if he thought a French approach to Mussolini would prevent French capitulation and Halifax agreed it would not, but he still did not want the British government to send a flat refusal to Reynaud. He recommended the line suggested by Chamberlain and, after some further discussion on that point, it was agreed that Churchill should tell Reynaud to await the outcome of Roosevelt's initiative.

By all accounts except the minutes, this was a stormy meeting. Antony Beevor suggests that it "perhaps encapsulated the most critical moment of the war, when Nazi Germany might have won". The clash between Churchill and Halifax was now open and Halifax threatened to resign if his views were ignored. Churchill had the full support of Attlee, Greenwood and Sinclair. He had convinced Chamberlain that it was pointless to negotiate but Chamberlain remained cautious about how to reply to Reynaud, and Churchill, unlike Greenwood for one, would not oppose Chamberlain about that. Later on, Churchill spoke to Halifax in the garden at 10, Downing Street and managed to calm him.

==== 10:00 pm meeting ====
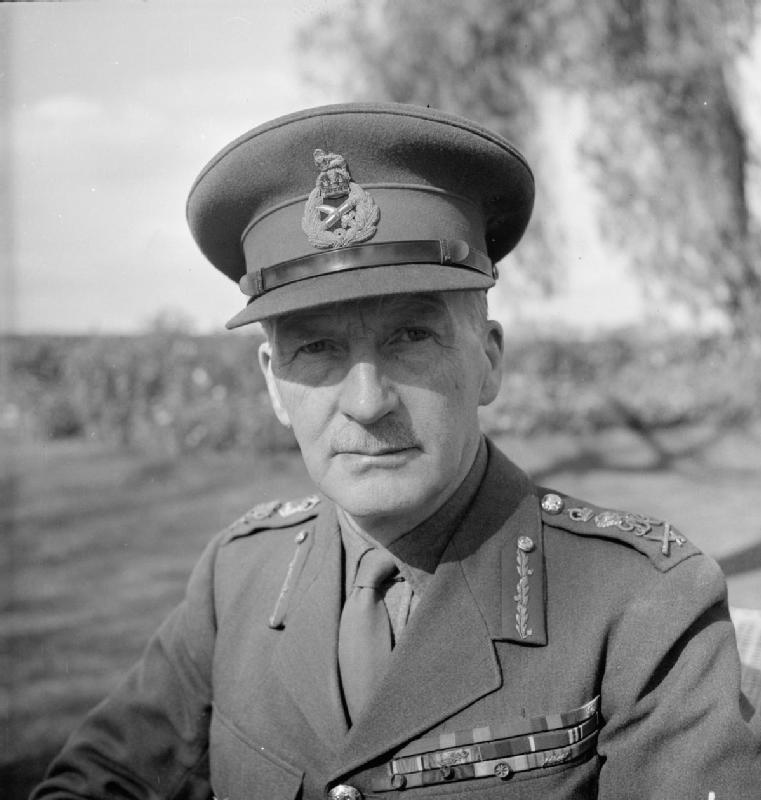
General Sir John Dill became CIGS on 27 May.

The war cabinet met again at 10:00 pm with the Chiefs of Staff in attendance. They included General Sir John Dill, who had just replaced Ironside as CIGS. This was a short meeting called to discuss events on the Western Front. The main issue was the intended surrender of Belgium from midnight that night. Weygand, with Churchill's support, had asked the French government to dissociate themselves from the Belgians and order Blanchard and Gort to fight on.

Also in attendance was Duff Cooper, the Minister of Information, who needed the war cabinet's advice on what to tell the public about the fall of Calais, the Belgian capitulation and the seriousness of the BEF position as they retreated to Dunkirk. Churchill wanted the seriousness to be emphasised but, for the sake of relatives, was against the publication of details (e.g., the names of regiments in Calais). He forbade any speculation about the outcome of Operation Dynamo until it became clear if it would succeed or fail. Churchill also said that he personally needed to make a full statement in Parliament but thought it might be another week before the situation had cleared sufficiently to enable him to do so. The war cabinet agreed that Cooper should proceed along the lines suggested by Churchill.

==== Diaries ====
In his diary entry for this day, Colville wrote that the Cabinet was "feverishly" considering the country's ability to continue fighting the war alone given that the fall of France seemed imminent and the evacuation of the British Expeditionary Force (BEF) was necessary. In his sole reference to confrontation between Churchill and Halifax, he wrote: "there are signs that Halifax is being defeatist". Halifax believed that Great Britain could no longer crush Germany and must rather preserve its own integrity and independence.

Cadogan, who was present at many of the war cabinet meetings, was also a prolific diarist. He wrote that Halifax was considering resignation after the 4:30 meeting, though Churchill had afterwards persuaded him to think again. Cadogan had sensed a difference of opinion arising between Chamberlain and Halifax. In a later entry, Cadogan expressed a hope that "we shan't delude ourselves into thinking we can do any good by making more offers or approaches". David Owen comments that this was a very different view from that of Cadogan's boss, Halifax, and much closer to that of Chamberlain who, as the minutes show, could see no practical use in an approach to Italy but was worried about upsetting the French.

In his own diary entry for the day, Halifax confirmed that he had seriously thought of resigning and had said so in the 4:30 meeting. He said Churchill and Greenwood had "talked the most frightful rot" about the proposed approach to Italy.

=== Tuesday, 28 May ===
Throughout the day, a total of 11,874 servicemen were evacuated from Dunkirk harbour and 5,930 from the beaches. The war cabinet held meetings at 11:30 am and 4:00 pm. The second meeting was adjourned at 6:15 pm so that Churchill could address the outer cabinet of 25 members and explain to them the war situation and prospects. The war cabinet reconvened at 7:00 pm for a short time.

==== First meeting (11:30 am) ====
This was attended by the service ministers and chiefs of staff along with Anderson, Caldecote and Cooper. The first item on the agenda was Belgium and there were two guests, Admiral Sir Roger Keyes and Lieutenant-Colonel G. M. O. Davy, who had both just returned from Belgium. They presented their views on the political and military situation in Belgium and then left the meeting.

There followed a discussion on the western front and the progress of Operation Dynamo. The war cabinet directed Cooper to make a statement on BBC Radio at 1:00 pm, telling the public that the BEF was fighting its way back to the coast with the full assistance of the RAF and the Royal Navy. It was agreed that Churchill would make a similar statement in the Commons later in the afternoon.

The next two items on the agenda were a report by the Chief of the Air Staff and a discussion about operations in Norway. The war cabinet then considered the Italian situation and a telegram from Washington which reported that Mussolini's response to Roosevelt had been "entirely negative". In Roosevelt's opinion, Mussolini would not take any military action during the next few days. The war cabinet decided to answer the French proposal in terms of awaiting developments, as Chamberlain had suggested the previous evening.

The meeting continued with questions about home security, naval operations and the protection of munition and aircraft factories. There was also a concern about subversive newspapers and the war cabinet agreed that a defence regulation must be introduced to prohibit printing and publication of subversive matter.

==== "Hard and heavy tidings" ====
Churchill went to the Commons and made a brief statement on the Western Front. He confirmed the capitulation of the Belgian army at 4:00 that morning but pointed out the intention of the Belgian government in exile to fight on. Churchill stressed that the British and French armies were fighting on and that they were receiving powerful assistance from the Royal Air Force and the Royal Navy. For security reasons, he would give no details of strategy or operations but hoped to say more next week. He concluded by saying:

Meanwhile, the House should prepare itself for hard and heavy tidings. I have only to add that nothing which may happen in this battle can in any way relieve us of our duty to defend the world cause to which we have vowed ourselves; nor should it destroy our confidence in our power to make our way, as on former occasions in our history, through disaster and through grief to the ultimate defeat of our enemies.

In response, the acting Leader of the Opposition, Hastings Lees-Smith, thanked him for his statement and pointed out that "we have not yet touched the fringe of the resolution of this country". In a brief comment before the session closed, Sir Percy Harris for the Liberals emphasised that Churchill's words reflected "not only the feeling of the whole House but the feeling of the whole nation".

==== Second meeting (4:00 pm) ====
Attendance was limited to the five war cabinet members with Sinclair, Cadogan and Bridges. As stated in the opening paragraph of the minutes, the meeting was summoned to consider a message received from the French Government again proposing that a direct approach should be made to Italy by France and Great Britain.

The argument between Churchill and Halifax began again almost immediately, but this time Churchill was not at all conciliatory. He took a much more resolute line than previously against any form of negotiation.

Halifax told his colleagues about another enquiry made by the Italian embassy in London. The request was that the British government should give a clear indication that they favoured mediation by Italy. Churchill countered by saying that it was the French purpose to have Mussolini mediating between Britain and Hitler, an unacceptable scenario. Halifax said it depended on being able to secure British independence as Britain could then make certain concessions to Italy. Churchill again used his slippery slope analogy in regard to the French and pointed out that things would be different after Germany had tried and failed to invade England.

Chamberlain now supported Churchill by stating that there could be no question of concessions being made to Italy while the war continued. Any concessions which might ever be necessary must be part of a general settlement with Germany, not with Italy. He doubted in any case if Mussolini wanted to come into the war yet and, as Greenwood had argued, Hitler might not want him to declare war at all. Halifax stuck to his guns and said that Britain might get better terms before France capitulated than later in the year after Britain's aircraft factories had been bombed.

That led to a discussion about defences against night-time bombing. Churchill then returned to the subject of the French request for mediation by Mussolini. In his view, Reynaud wanted the British to meet Hitler. If that happened, the terms would be unacceptable and, he said, on leaving the conference Britain should find that all the forces of resolution that were now at its disposal would have vanished. It was clear, he concluded, that Reynaud only wanted to end the war. Chamberlain agreed with Churchill's diagnosis, but he wanted to keep France in the war as long as possible and urged caution in the British reply to Reynaud. He suggested, with general approval, that Reynaud should be told the present was not the time to make an approach to Mussolini and that France and Britain would fare better in the future if both continued the struggle.

Halifax reminded everyone that Reynaud had also wanted the Allies to address an appeal to Roosevelt. Churchill had no objection to such an appeal but Greenwood accused Reynaud of "hawking" appeals around, this being yet another attempt to get out of the war. Chamberlain thought Reynaud wanted Roosevelt involved as a counterpoint to Mussolini at a peace conference.

Churchill picked up Greenwood's argument and added that, while Reynaud wanted out of the war, he did not want to breach the Allied treaty obligations. If Mussolini became a mediator, he would "take his whack out of us" and Hitler would hardly be so foolish as to let British rearmament continue. Churchill continued that "We should get no worse terms if we went on fighting, even if we were beaten, than were open to us now." He reminded his colleagues that a continuation of the conflict would see severe losses inflicted on Germany also. Even so, Halifax said he still could not see what was so wrong in trying out the possibilities of mediation, but then Chamberlain said he did not see what could be lost by deciding to fight on to the end. While the government might, dispassionately, be prepared to consider any "decent terms" offered, Chamberlain asserted that the alternative to fighting on nevertheless involved a considerable gamble.

The minutes confirm the war cabinet's agreement with Chamberlain's comment as "a true statement of the case". Churchill declared that the nations which went down fighting rose again, but those which surrendered tamely were finished. He added his view that the chances of decent terms being offered were a thousand to one against.

Chamberlain called for a realistic assessment of the situation. Although in principle, Halifax was right to say that Britain should consider decent terms in the unlikely event that they were offered, Chamberlain did not believe that an approach to Mussolini would produce such an offer. He again urged caution when replying to Reynaud in case France capitulated immediately, and it would be unwise to give them any pretext for doing so. The key to the current problem was phrasing the reply so that France would not see it as a complete rejection of their proposal, only that now was not the right time to be doing it. The war cabinet expressed general agreement with his views.

Attlee now spoke and pointed out the necessity of recognising British public opinion. He advised that, while the war cabinet had been able to watch the situation gradually unfold, the public would sustain a severe shock when they realised the dangerous position of the BEF. It was necessary to raise and maintain public morale, but that would be impossible if the government did what France wanted. Greenwood agreed with him and pointed out that people in the industrial areas would regard any sign of government weakness as a disaster.

General agreement was expressed with Chamberlain's views about how to reply to Reynaud, although Sinclair suggested that Churchill should exhort Reynaud and Weygand to fight on. The war cabinet decided against the proposed appeal to Roosevelt, which they considered premature. Halifax suggested drafting a broadcast for Churchill to speak to the Dominions and Churchill said he would be happy to consider it, but that he should not broadcast at the present time.

It was by now 6:15 pm and the war cabinet agreed to adjourn so that Chamberlain and Halifax could prepare a draft of the reply to Reynaud. Churchill, meanwhile, wished to address the members of his outer cabinet.

==== Churchill meets with the outer cabinet (6:15 pm) ====
As the war cabinet adjourned, it was now clear that Halifax was in a minority of one given the view expressed by Chamberlain about the alternative to fighting on. Nevertheless, Halifax still held a powerful position within the Conservative party, even without Chamberlain's support, and Churchill still needed the approval of the outer cabinet for his policy of fighting on, alone if necessary. He began by telling the 25 ministers that Great Britain was going to fight and was not going to negotiate.

Hugh Dalton, who was the Minister of Economic Warfare, recalled Churchill saying, as he had done in the war cabinet meeting, that Britain would not get better terms from Germany now than if she fought it out. Germany's terms, he said would include a demand for the fleet and Great Britain would become a puppet state "under Mosley or some such person". Churchill went on to a dramatic and defiant conclusion by reportedly saying that "if this long island story of ours is to end at last, let it end only when each one of us lies choking in his own blood upon the ground".

Dalton recalled that there was unanimous approval round the table and not even the faintest flicker of dissent. Several ministers patted Churchill on the shoulder as they were leaving. Leo Amery, recently appointed Secretary of State for India, wrote that the meeting "left all of us tremendously heartened by Winston's resolution and grip of things". As Beevor puts it, Halifax had been decisively out-manoeuvred and Great Britain would fight on to the end. Max Hastings points out how much Churchill relied on the eventual support of Chamberlain as leader of the Conservative Party: this was critical in deflecting Halifax's proposals.

Hastings outlines Churchill's dilemma faced with the prospect of Halifax, the man widely considered to have majority support in the Conservative Party, quitting his government just at the moment of supreme crisis when Operation Dynamo was barely underway. Great Britain at that time, perhaps more so than at any other time in history, needed to present a united face to the world. It may be argued that Churchill should have let Halifax go, but he could not do that because he needed the support of the huge Conservative majority in the Commons and, although he could never again have confidence in Halifax as a colleague, he was obliged to endure him for another seven months in order to be sure of retaining Conservative support. It was not until December, a month after he succeeded Chamberlain as Tory leader, that Churchill finally felt able to consign Halifax to exile in Washington.

There is a legend, Hastings says, of a united Britain in the summer months of 1940 which stood firm against Hitler and, eventually, having formed the key alliances with the US and the USSR, defeated him. According to Hastings, that was a reality and it would all have been different if another man had been prime minister. If the political faction seeking a negotiated peace had prevailed then Britain, crucially, would have been out of the war. Hitler might then have won the war. In May 1940, Churchill understood that even the mere gesture of considering peace terms would have a disastrous impact on the country and his policy of fighting on would have been irretrievably compromised.

==== War cabinet reconvenes (7:00 pm) ====
This session lasted only twenty minutes. Churchill began by describing the response of the outer cabinet to the latest news. As the minutes recorded it:

The Prime Minister said that in the interval he had seen the Ministers not in the War Cabinet. He had told them the latest news. They had not expressed alarm at the position in France, but had expressed the greatest satisfaction when he had told them that there was no chance of our giving up the struggle. He did not remember having ever before heard a gathering of persons occupying high places in political life express themselves so emphatically.

Churchill went on to read out a letter which he had received from General Edward Spears in Paris. This confirmed the support of Weygand for the retreat by Gort and Blanchard to the Channel coast. Chamberlain read the draft reply which he and Halifax had prepared during the interim, explaining that they were not merely presenting a British point of view as the purpose of the message was to persuade Reynaud that it was in France's interest to go on fighting. Churchill said he was happy with the draft and Halifax was authorised to despatch it to Reynaud.

Jenkins says that Halifax at this point had recognised that he was beaten, largely because he could not overcome Churchill's resolve but crucially, perhaps, because he could see that Chamberlain had moved away from him and was firmly on Churchill's side. With the Mussolini option firmly rejected, the war cabinet turned to the remaining mediation question of an approach to the United States and Halifax showed them a telegram received from General Jan Smuts in South Africa, which effectively endorsed a message received earlier from Robert Menzies in Australia. The gist of it was that the Dominions wanted to tell the US government that they were going to fight on even if they had to do it alone. They wanted nothing for themselves and were only concerned with the defence of world liberty against Nazi domination. The question for America was would they help or would they stand aside and take no action in defence of the rights of man?

Halifax suggested that the government should seek the opinion of the British ambassador in Washington about whether a message on the lines of Smuts' proposal would change American public opinion. Churchill was reticent about this and said he thought that any appeal to America in the present situation would be premature. He said the best way to command respect from the American people was by making a bold stand against Hitler.

The war cabinet concluded the meeting by agreeing that the French proposal of an approach to Mussolini was pointless and would serve no useful purpose, though it was important that their reply should show respect to the French and make clear that they were considering the problem from both the French and British points of view. Halifax was authorised to reply to Reynaud on the lines of the draft which he and Chamberlain had prepared. The war cabinet further concluded that any approach to America for help must be on the lines suggested by Smuts rather than by Reynaud. It was agreed that Halifax should communicate with the embassy in Washington to seek their views about the wisdom of any such approach.

When the British communiqué arrived in Paris, General Spears was with Reynaud, who had been under pressure from the defeatists in his own cabinet to approach Mussolini. Spears said that Churchill's resolve had "a magical effect" on Reynaud who immediately vetoed any further communication with Italy and resolved to fight on.

== Later events ==
There was a lengthy war cabinet meeting in Downing Street at 11:30 am on Wednesday, 29 May. It was essentially about military matters and attended by service ministers, chiefs of staff and a number of additional ministers. Churchill's stance on negotiation was fully vindicated when Halifax had to report a communication he had received from Sir Percy Loraine, the ambassador in Rome. In a meeting with Count Ciano, Italy's Foreign Minister, Loraine was told that Italian entry into the war was now certain with only the date to be decided. Ciano also said Mussolini would not listen to any overtures from France, even if they offered their Mediterranean territories to Italy. The war cabinet noted all of this and began to put into effect plans to detain or deport Italian citizens living in Great Britain. There were over 18,000 in total and at least 1,000 were listed as potentially dangerous.

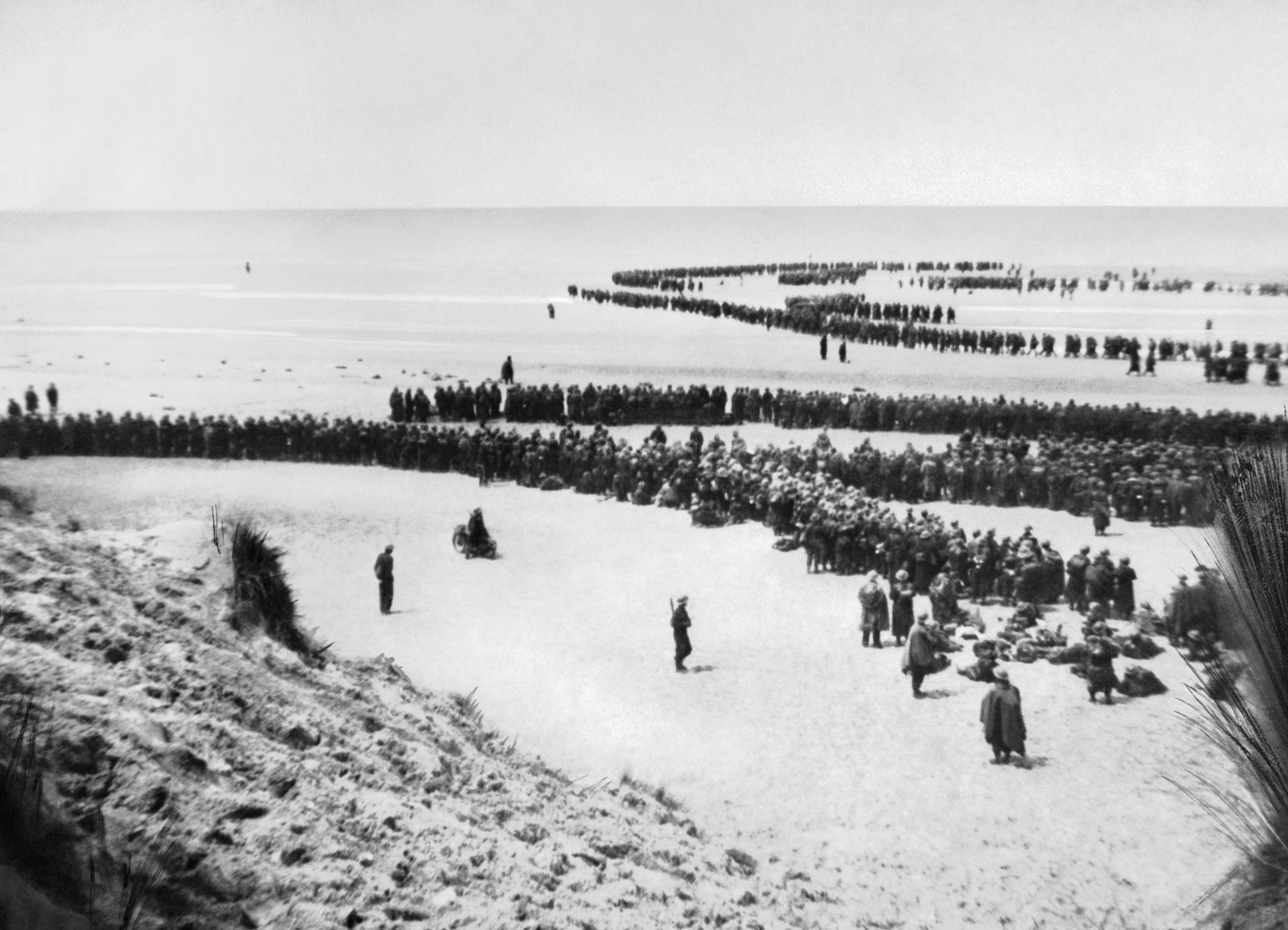
British troops evacuating Dunkirk's beaches

After the encouraging number of 17,000-plus evacuated from Dunkirk on the critical day of Tuesday, the 28th, there was by comparison a flood of about 50,000 per day on the Wednesday, Thursday, Friday and Saturday (29 May to 1 June). Operation Dynamo ended on Tuesday, 4 June when the French rearguard surrendered. An estimated 338,226 servicemen were evacuated, but virtually all their equipment and supplies were lost. The total was far in excess of expectations and it gave rise to a popular view that Dunkirk had been a miracle, and even a victory. Churchill himself referred to "a miracle of deliverance" in his "We shall fight on the beaches" speech to the Commons that afternoon. Even so, he shortly reminded everyone that: "We must be very careful not to assign to this deliverance the attributes of a victory. Wars are not won by evacuations".

The Germans shifted their attention southwards and initiated Fall Rot on 5 June, the day after Dunkirk fell. Mussolini finally made his expected declaration of war on the 10th, prompting Churchill to predict that travellers would no longer have to go all the way to Pompeii to see Italian ruins. The Wehrmacht occupied Paris on the 14th and completed their conquest of France on 25 June.

Chamberlain resigned from the war cabinet on 29 September 1940 for health reasons as he had cancer of the colon. He died on 9 November. Churchill was elected to succeed him as leader of the Conservative Party and that removed any doubts about his position as prime minister where his own party was concerned.

On 12 December, the British Ambassador to the United States, Lord Lothian, died suddenly. Churchill had already made some changes to the war cabinet by bringing in Sir John Anderson, Lord Beaverbrook, Ernest Bevin and Sir Kingsley Wood. He now decided to remove Halifax and appointed Anthony Eden to replace him as Foreign Secretary. Halifax was offered the Washington placement which he was obliged, in the circumstances, to accept. He held the role until 1 May 1946. Jenkins says he was successful, after a hesitant start. Jenkins concludes his coverage of the cabinet crisis with reference to Churchill's memoirs, written in 1948, in which he "breathtakingly" declared that the question of whether to fight on or not "never found a place in the war cabinet agenda".

== Bibliography ==
- Beevor, Antony (2012). The Second World War. London: Weidenfeld & Nicolson. ISBN 978-0-297-84497-6.
- Colville, John (1985). The Fringes of Power, Volume One: September 1939 to September 1941. Sevenoaks: Hodder & Stoughton Ltd. ISBN 978-0-340-40269-6..
- Hastings, Max (2009). Finest Years. Churchill as Warlord, 1940–45. Hammersmith: Harper Collins. ISBN 978-0-00-726367-7.
- Hermiston, Roger (2016). All Behind You, Winston – Churchill's Great Coalition, 1940–45. London: Aurum Press. ISBN 978-1-78131-664-1.
- Jenkins, Roy (2002). Churchill. London: Macmillan Press. ISBN 978-0-330-48805-1.
- Lukacs, John (1999). Five Days in London: May 1940. London: Yale University Press. ISBN 978-0-300-08466-5.
- Owen, David (2016). Cabinet's Finest Hour. London: Haus Publishing Ltd. ISBN 978-1-910376-55-3.
- Shakespeare, Nicholas (2017). Six Minutes in May. London: Vintage. ISBN 978-1-78470-100-0.
- Thompson, Julian (2011) [2008]. Dunkirk: Retreat to Victory. New York: Arcade. ISBN 978-1-61145-314-0.
