= Philip Inman, 1st Baron Inman =

British Labour politician (1892–1979)

The Right Honourable The Lord Inman PC

Lord Keeper of the Privy Seal
- In office 17 April 1947 – 7 October 1947
- Monarch: George VI
- Prime Minister: Clement Attlee
- Preceded by: Arthur Greenwood
- Succeeded by: The Viscount Addison

Member of the House of Lords Lord Temporal
- In office 1 January 1946 – 26 August 1979; Hereditary Peerage
- Preceded by: Peerage created
- Succeeded by: Peerage extinct

Personal details
- Born: 12 June 1892
- Died: 26 August 1979 (aged 87)
- Party: Labour

Philip Albert Inman, 1st Baron Inman, PC (12 June 1892 – 26 August 1979) was a British Labour politician.

== Background and education ==
Inman was the son of Philip Inman (d. 1894), of Knaresborough, Yorkshire, a rate collector, by his wife Hannah Bickerdyke, of Great Ouseburn, Yorkshire. He was educated at Headingley College, Leeds, and Leeds University. He fought in the First World War, where he was invalided out. He married May Dew on 27 August 1919; they had a son, Philip John Cope Inman, on 15 March 1929. In 1910, when he was an apprentice to a chemist, he was a member of the Malton Mutual Improvement Society, where during a debate he once argued for the abolition of the House of Lords.

== Career ==
In 1946 he was raised to the peerage as Baron Inman, of Knaresborough in the West Riding of the County of York. He served under Clement Attlee as Lord Privy Seal, with a seat in the cabinet, from April to October 1947, when he resigned. The same year he was Chairman of the Board of Governors of the BBC.

== Personal life and death ==
Lord Inman died in August 1979, aged 87. His son had predeceased him in 1968 and so the barony became extinct.

Coat of arms of Philip Inman, 1st Baron Inman
Crest A covered cup Or between two wyvern’s wings Azure both charged with an Ermine spot Gold. Escutcheon Per chevron Ermine and Azure in chief two lions rampant combatant Or holding between the forepaws a Maltese cross Gules surmounted by an annulet Argent and in base a triple-towered castled Proper. Supporters On either side a golden retriever Proper gorged with a collar Sable charged with three roses Argent barbed and seeded Proper. Motto Fide Caritate Ministerio

== Legacy ==
A plaque in Knaresborough commemorates the house in which Inman was born.

Political offices
Preceded by Arthur Greenwood	Lord Privy Seal; 1947	Succeeded by The Viscount Addison
Media offices
Preceded by Sir Allan Powell	Chairman of the BBC Board of Governors; 1947	Succeeded by Ernest Simon
Peerage of the United Kingdom
New creation	Baron Inman; 1946–1979	Extinct
