= Allan Powell =

British politician (1876–1948)

Sir George Allan Powell (1 February 1876 – 24 January 1948) was Chairman of the BBC Board of Governors between 1939 and 1946.

Educated at Bancroft's School and at King's College London, and was called to the bar at Gray's Inn in 1907. Elected to the council of the royal borough of Kensington in 1932, he was twice mayor, in 1937–8 and 1938–9. He was a member of the Import Duties Advisory Committee between 1932 and 1939.

Powell was knighted GBE in the New Year Honours of 1943.

Media offices
Preceded by Ronald Collet Norman	Chairman of the BBC Board of Governors; 1939–1946	Succeeded by Philip Inman
