= Priyanka Bakaya =

Australian-American entrepreneur

- Occupation: entrepreneur
- Known for: PK Clean

Priyanka Bakaya is an Australian-American entrepreneur. She founded PK Clean, a clean energy company which converts plastic waste into new products, and served as its chief executive officer.

== Early years ==
Bakaya grew up in Australia, where she attended Lauriston Girls' School. Her mother worked as a CPA and her father was a financial services entrepreneur. Bakaya is of Kashmiri descent. As a child, she developed her interest in science through interacting with Percy Kean, an inventor who developed solutions for clean energy and was close to her family.

Bakaya attended Stanford University for her undergraduate education in economics and technology and Massachusetts Institute of Technology for an MBA.

== Career ==
After graduating from Stanford, she took a position as an energy research analyst at Lehman in New York City. Kean died in 2007; around the same time, oil prices rose by twice their original price. Bakaya decided to apply Kean's discoveries and found PK Clean in 2009, applying to MIT to give her the skills necessary to found the business. The company's name was derived from Kean's initials. She started working with co-founder Benjamin Coates in 2011, when they were Lightspeed Venture Fellows in California.

In 2012, PK Clean moved to Salt Lake City, where it set up a facility with the capacity to convert 20,000 pounds of non-recycled plastic to 60 barrels of oil each day and zero toxic emissions, using the depolymerization process. The company was awarded MIT's Clean Energy Prize in 2011 and third place in the Rice University Business Plan Super Bowl.

== Recognition ==
In 2011, Bakaya was the recipient of the prize for female entrepreneurs at the Rice Business Plan Competition. In December 2012, Bakaya was featured by Forbes as one of its 30 Under 30 in the Energy category. In 2013, Fortune named Bakaya as one of its 40 Under 40 to watch.

Bakaya was the North American Laureate for the Cartier Women's Initiative Award in 2013. In 2014, she was featured in Marie Claire as a One Woman Genius and in Elle Magazine as 12 Genius Young Women Shaping the Future. In 2015, she gave a TEDx talk on the Power of Waste. In 2016, she won money from Steve Case as part of his Rise of the Rest Tour.
