= BBC Board =

Governing board of the British Broadcasting Corporation

- Predecessor: BBC Trust
- Formation: 2 April 2017; 9 years ago
- Chair: Samir Shah
- Website: www.bbc.com/aboutthebbc/whoweare/bbcboard/

The BBC Board is the governing board of the British Broadcasting Corporation. The board replaced the BBC Trust in April 2017.

The chair and four non-executive members representing the four nations are appointed by the King-in-Council, on the advice of the UK secretary of state. Five other non-executive members are appointed by the board and the four executive members are chosen by the board.

As of July 2026, the board includes the following:

Name	Position	Term of office	
Samir Shah	Chairman	4 March 2024	3 March 2028
Matt Brittin	Director-General	18 May 2026	—
Rhodri Talfan Davies	Deputy director-general	9 June 2026	8 June 2028
Jody Ford	Non-executive director	12 January 2026	11 January 2030
Robbie Gibb	Member for England	7 May 2021	6 May 2028
Muriel Gray	Member for Scotland	3 January 2022	2 January 2030
Chris Jones	Non-executive director	24 July 2023	23 July 2027
Bérangère Michel	Group chief financial officer	5 January 2026	4 January 2028
Michael Plaut	Member for Wales	1 June 2024	31 May 2028
Michael Smyth	Member for Northern Ireland	20 July 2023	19 July 2027
Marinella Soldi	Non-executive director	11 September 2023	10 March 2027
Leigh Tavaziva	Chief operating officer	1 February 2023	September 2026 (Note: Tavaziva's term of office ends on 31 January 2027 but she announced in March 2026 that she would be stepping down early.)
Caroline Thomson	Senior independent director	3 April 2025	2 April 2029
Vacant (Note: Deborah Turness is the outgoing CEO of BBC News and Current Affairs, but after announcing her resignation from that role she stood down from the board.)	CEO, BBC News and Current Affairs	9 November 2025	

== Executive committee ==
The executive committee is responsible for the day-to-day operations of the broadcaster.

As of July 2026, the Executive Committee includes the following:

Name	Position
Matt Brittin	Chairman; director-general; chief executive; editor-in-chief
Kerris Bright	Chief customer officer
John Curbishley	Chief strategy and transformation officer
Rhodri Talfan Davies	Deputy director-general
Storm Fagan	Chief technology and product officer
Tom Fussell	CEO, BBC Studios
Alice Macandrew	Group corporate affairs director
Bérangère Michel	Group chief financial officer
Jonathan Munro	Interim CEO, BBC News & Current Affairs
Kate Phillips	Chief content officer
Uzair Qadeer	Group chief people officer
Rhuanedd Richards	Interim nations director
Leigh Tavaziva	Chief operating officer
