= BBC independence =

On independence of the BBC

The independence of the BBC

The BBC must be independent in all matters concerning the fulfilment of its Mission and the promotion of the Public Purposes, particularly as regards editorial and creative decisions, the times and manner in which its output and services are supplied, and in the management of its affairs.

Paragraph (1) is subject to any provision made by or under this Charter or the Framework Agreement or otherwise by law.

— Article 3 of the BBC Charter, 2016 (Note: While usually referred to by its effective date (1 January 2017) the 2017 charter was, unsurprisingly, passed into law before taking effect and is thus dated to December 2016.)

The BBC's independence is one of its core tenets; its editorial independence limited only by its mission of impartiality in the public interest. With the government, duly or not, advising on what the public interest is.

The BBC has, with the possible exception of World War II, long displayed a degree of independence that public broadcasting in other Western European countries came to only later. This generalisation by Goodwin is echoed often, though the perceived and actual degrees of independence are ofttimes debated.

Seaton writes that chairs of the governing body have frequently been chosen with the aim of aligning the BBC with certain agendas. She suggests that, while this approach may appear confrontational and potentially antagonistic and recent chairs have been too business oriented, not every controversial appointment turned out to be a bad one. She gives the negative example of Charles Hill, who she considers to be perceived as detrimental from a historical perspective, but states that subsequent appointments like Marmaduke Hussey and Christopher Bland while met with similar scepticism initially, proved to be great chairs.

Of interest also, though contentious, is that internal reports (such as the Balen Report) aimed at checking its own standards of journalism, have been ruled as not subject to the Freedom of Information Act 2000—and thus not subject to public release. It marks a perhaps odd sort of independence from overt public scrutiny.

== World Service ==
The World Service

Taking account of the strategy and the budget it has set, the BBC will agree with the Foreign Secretary-

(a) objectives, priorities and targets for the World Service;
(b) the languages in which the World Service is to be provided

— Article 33.6 of the Agreement, 2016

The various foreign services of the BBC have always been tied, in some manner, to the national interest. In the 2017 Agreement, that means the Foreign Secretary. Article 33.6 (right) is subject to the Mission and the Public Purposes of the BBC as defined in the Charter, but it supersedes Article 3 (independence). The BBC agrees "objectives, targets and priorities" with the Foreign Secretary in a document named the BBC World Service Licence. The Chair of the BBC Board and the Foreign Secretary (or representatives) meet at least annually to review performance against these objectives, priorities and targets.

This policy has put the BBC at odds with a list of Governments including East Germany, the Soviet Union and China. Though it must be said that the external service committed to providing accurate news as early as World War II. Though, Rawnsley for instance goes as far as to draw historic parallels to the state-owned broadcaster Voice of America that he describes as very much the 'voice' of the US government.

‘Its greatest victory’, according to George Orwell, was its accurate news. ‘Even in India where the population are so hostile they would not listen to British propaganda and will hardly listen to a British entertainment program, they listen to BBC news because they believe it approximates to the truth’.

== Interference by the British government ==
=== 1926 General Strike ===
In 1926, the General Council of the Trades Union Congress (TUC) called a general strike to protest poor working conditions and impending pay cuts affecting roughly 1.2 million coal miners. Labour Party leaders, including Ramsay MacDonald and Philip Snowden, criticised the BBC for a biased and misleading portrayal of the strike.

Prime Minister Stanley Baldwin was coached by John Reith during a national address concerning the strike, which was transmitted from Reith's residence. When MacDonald requested airtime to reply, Reith initially supported the idea. However, because Baldwin was strongly opposed to MacDonald broadcasting, Reith ultimately refused the request.

Baldwin's government blocked the BBC from airing statements from Labour and TUC leaders about the strike. When Philip Snowden, the former Labour Chancellor of the Exchequer, wrote to the Radio Times to protest the BBC's treatment of the unions, Reith conceded that the organisation was not fully independent of the government. Randall Davidson, the Archbishop of Canterbury, wished to broadcast a "peace appeal" urging an immediate end to the strike, the renewal of coal industry subsidies, and the preservation of miners' wages. Reith denied the request, concern that Winston Churchill—who wanted to use the BBC as a government tool—would exploit the speech to seize control of the corporation. Reith later noted in his diary that the government "know[s] they can trust us not to be really impartial".

A post-strike analysis conducted by the BBC's Programme Correspondence Department revealed that among those polled, 3,696 praised the coverage while 176 criticised it.

=== 1932 - The Hashagen affair ===
The Corporation feels that an incident so contrary to the spirit and intention of the Royal Charter should not pass without protest [...] The Governors venture to assume that it will not form a precedent. — John Whitley, chair of the BBC, in a letter to the Cabinet Secretary

In 1932, the BBC had planned a series of interviews for a programme on 'risky exploits' called Hazard with two German officers from the Great War: U-boot captain Ernst Hashagen and Zeppelin commander Joachim Briehaupt. After a first radio interview with Briehaupt had spawned public criticisms, the following talks with Hashagen were cancelled on advice of the government. After cabinet discussion, Postmaster General Kingsley Wood had approached John Reith who didn't initially agree with the government's 'view that the talk should be cancelled', leaving the decision to John Whitley, the chair of the BBC at the time—who then agreed to drop the broadcast. Whitley, MPs, as well as the press all voiced disagreement. The press at the time especially was fiercely critical of the government writing on the 'Muzzling of the BBC' and that 'one can hardly imagine a sillier or more petty intervention by the Government in the business of the B.B.C.'

=== 1936 - Abdication ===
The crisis spawned by the abdication of Edward VIII in 1936 is said to have been the first time the Government seriously considered taking over the broadcast of the BBC.

=== 1937-84 - MI5 vetting ===
From the 1930s until the 1980s, the BBC kept a number of clandestine files on applicants accused by MI5 of political subversion, in particular those deemed to be communists or fellow travellers of communism, and also members of far-right organisations. They were marked with a distinctive upward-facing green arrow, which bore resemblance to a Christmas tree and had the effect of blacklisting a number of applicants for roles in the BBC. Knowledge of the files was made public in 1985 after being reported on by The Observer. By that time, the practice had ceased, but a number of files remained. They were destroyed in the 1990s following the end of the Cold War.

=== 1938-45 - World War II ===
The British policy of appeasement regarding fascist Italy and Germany eventually lead to the Phoney War; the period between the British declaration of war on 3 September 1939 and the German invasion of France, 10 May 1940. Starting with a speech given by Neville Chamberlain on 27 September 1938 in the days prior to the conference on the Munich Agreement, the BBC, at the request of the government, began broadcasting regular programmes in German. First to project the British position and later as propaganda against Nazi rule, believed at the time to have weak support.

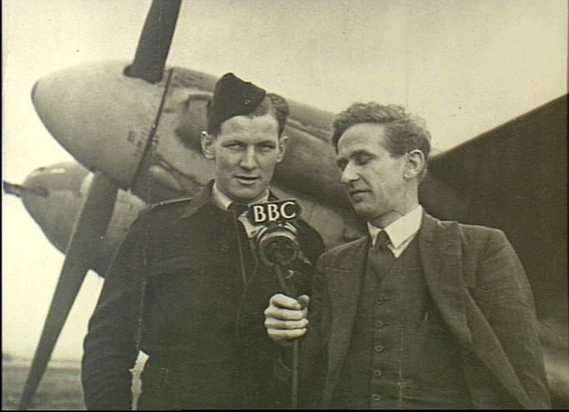
BBC interview in March 1945

While the BBC would continue to claim independence from the government throughout the war years, in what was a war of national survival, there were inevitable compromises. The period increasingly had the government direct the BBC in propaganda efforts, with almost weekly government missives regarding the general media campaign. However, through its consistent and trustworthy reporting both domestically and internationally, the BBC gradually gained more liberties in the choices of its programming again. The service aired comedy shows like It's That Man Again, which ridiculed the bureaucratic controls of the war, or talks like those of J. B. Priestley which challenged official views and championed the public's experience of the war. Crucially, while being anti-Nazi, it was not anti-German. This lead Hugh Greene, who had joined the BBC German service in October 1940, to be able to set up new, independent and trusted media in Germany after the war.

=== 1950 - Party Manners ===
In 1950, having aired the political comedy Party Manners on stage, radio and, once, on television already, a repeat showing of it was stopped. The play was about a Labour minister dealing with nuclear energy. The Attlee government that had its parliamentary majority reduced in the 1950 election advised the BBC that it found the play 'offensive'. Chair Ernest Simon agreed to drop the play from the program, which earned violent criticism from the press, the BBC's General Advisory Council as well as in the House of Lords.

As of 2024, the BBC on its website softly implies this relatively minor incident to be the only time the government interfered with anything to do with 'nuclear', closing their piece in the history section Editorial independence: the BBC and Government by quoting chair Simon to have not foreseen 'the "hurricane" of feeling his decision would stir'; and that "quite obviously no Chairman will ever dream of doing anything of the sort again". No other piece there is on nuclear energy or weapons.

=== 1953 - Iranian coup d'état ===
The British government used the BBC's Persian service for advancing its propaganda against democratically elected prime minister of Iran Mohammad Mosaddegh and anti-Mosaddegh material were repeatedly aired on the radio channel to the extent that Iranian staff at the BBC Persian radio went on strike to protest the move. The BBC was at times even used directly in the operations, sending coded messages to the coup plotters by changing the wording of its broadcasts.

=== 1954/5 - H Bomb coverage ===
When Nesta Pain worked on a report on the H bomb in late 1954, pressure by the Churchill government had the then chairman of the Board of Governors of the BBC Alexander Cadogan reassure the Postmaster General that ‘the Corporation never had any plan for mounting a feature on the hydrogen bomb in the New Year as suggested in your letter’ by the 24 January 1955. The letter was written after a month of well documented directives that 'no programmes should be broadcast about atomic weapons'.

Internal memos of the BBC showed that the Director General was sanitizing the broadcast on behalf of the government by advising against the airing of "a sober, but nevertheless chilling account of the dangers of radiation" by Joseph Rotblat.

=== 1956 - Suez Crisis ===
Although the British government pressured the BBC to support the war, the BBC continued to report on the Suez Crisis even-handedly. It came out of the crisis with its reputation for independence from the Government 'enhanced'—although Goodwin documents at least two cases of major governmental influence being exerted. He, too, ironically noted the "minor local difficulty" of the chair of the BBC Board of Governors at the time also being the director of the Suez Canal Company. The row had the government seriously consider taking over the service when then prime minister Anthony Eden wanted to ensure that only the government line—that the British and French only invaded Eqypt to keep peace and because its president Nasser was breaking international law—would reach the home (and international) audience.

=== 1965 - The War Game ===
Goodwin suggests that the 1954/5 conflict over coverage of the H bomb informed the BBC's initial decision not to air the documentary The War Game. He affirms Michael Tracey's critical view of the government's role in the controversy (Note: (Goodwin cites "Michael Tracey (in Aubrey 1982, 38-55)" here)) and adds that Norman Brook was the Cabinet Secretary and participant from the Government side in the Feb 15 1955 meeting with the BBC over the H Bomb. Brook, by now Chairman of the Board of Governors of the BBC, recommended that "the Government should have an opportunity of expressing a view about this", after Huw Wheldon had initially green lit the project.

=== 1969 - Influence of international media ===
In 1969, Reuters agreed to open a reporting service in the Middle East as part of a British Foreign Office plan to influence the international media. To protect Reuters' reputation, which may have been damaged if British government funding became known, the BBC paid Reuters "enhanced subscriptions" for access to its news service, and was in turn compensated by the British government for the extra expense. Under the plan, the BBC paid Reuters £350,000 over four years.

=== 1979-1994 - The Troubles ===
Throughout the Troubles, UK broadcasters were regularly required to stop or postpone the broadcast of documentaries and other programmes relating to Ireland, and government intimidation and restrictive laws had resulted in forms of self-censorship. The Premiership of Margaret Thatcher then saw more direct governmental interference of media reporting on the conflict in her attempts to "try to find ways to starve the terrorist and the hijacker of the oxygen of publicity on which they depend". (Note: The quote is from a July 1985 speech Margaret Thatcher gave to the American Bar Association. – The evaluation is Savage's.)

An INLA interview in July 1979 on BBC's Tonight caused a controversy involving Prime Minister Thatcher and was the last time such an interview was heard on British television. Also, the 1979 Panorama film of the IRA on patrol in Carrickmore was seized by police under the Prevention of Terrorism Acts following an outcry in parliament and the press. But one of the most prominent instances of this was the 1985 Real Lives documentary for the BBC, At the Edge of the Union. The programme featured extensive footage of Sinn Féin's Martin McGuinness and the Democratic Unionist Party's Gregory Campbell discussing the Troubles, and following direct intervention by the government it was temporarily blocked from being aired. The incident led to a one-day strike by members of the National Union of Journalists, who walked out in protest that the BBC's independence was being undermined.

On 19 October 1988 the British followed Ireland, who had kept Sinn Féin and other targeted groups off radio and television since 1972, and passed voice restrictions of direct statements by representatives or supporters of eleven Irish political and military organisations. There had already been minimal coverage of Sinn Féin by the BBC prior. The ban then saw further decline in coverage of Sinn Féin and republican viewpoints. The delays and uncertainties caused by ambiguities, voice-overs and subtitles often lead to coverage and films being dropped entirely. MPs protested the decision, and the Chair of the BBC, Marmaduke Hussey called the ban a "very dangerous precedent".

=== 2014 - Coordinated coverage of police action ===
In response to allegations that would never be found of substance, police searched the property of a famous rock star in 2014, having informed the BBC prior. After police tipped off BBC journalist Dan Johnson, BBC reporters were on the scene as police arrived, and a BBC helicopter covered the raid as it happened. South Yorkshire Police initially denied leaking details of the property search—later confirming that they had been "working with a media outlet" about the investigation.

Law enforcement tried to spin the incident as "extortion" in front of the Home Affairs Select Committee which was ridiculed by MPs. Former Attorney General Dominic Grieve went as far as, asserting a "collusive relationship", stating that the decision to tip off the BBC "seems quite extraordinary."

Much of the public as well as legal opinion did not see the state at fault in the matter, though, and the BBC was sued successfully for infringement of the right to privacy. £210,000 in damages were awarded in 2018. Journalists expressed worry at the precedent the ruling would set for future coverage of criminality.

== Interference internationally ==
=== Nazi Germany ===
The Nazis tried to jam and forbid listening to all allied broadcasts. Though when Hugh Greene flew to Sweden in 1942, his evaluation was: 'not discouraging' as long as speech were kept clean. They deemed the BBC's German language service ("Londoner Rundfunk") established in the war the number one enemy broadcast. They heavily persecuted anyone who listened to it; and in areas like Poland even those who possessed radios capable of receiving the broadcast.

=== Russia ===
On 17 August 2007, it was reported that FM broadcast of the BBC's Russian-language service in Russia was to be dropped by order of the Russian government. The financial organisation Finam, which owned Bolshoye Radio, the last of three services to drop the BBC Russia broadcasts, said through its spokesman, Igor Ermachenkov, "Any media which is government-financed is propaganda – it's a fact, it's not negative". A spokesman, for the BBC responded, "Although the BBC is funded by the UK government... a fundamental principle of its constitution and its regulatory regime is that it is editorially independent of the UK government". Reports put the development in the context of criticism of the Russian government for curbing media freedom ahead of the 2008 Russian presidential election and strained British-Russian relations. Reporters Without Borders condemned the move as censorship.

=== Jamming of the foreign services ===
The Soviet Union, Iran, Iraq and Myanmar/Burma have all jammed the BBC in the past. Mandarin was heavily jammed by the People's Republic of China until shortwave transmissions for that service ceased but China continues to jam transmissions in Uzbek and has since started to jam transmissions in English throughout Asia.

== See also ==
- BBC Monitoring (Note: Rawnsley discusses the BBC Monitoring service and its relationship to the United Kingdom's public diplomacy through the lens of the Cold War. He does not however attribute malice. Rather, a discomfort with whom the BBC is sharing information on the content of other nations' radio broadcasting with. (The FBIS.))
- BBC News#Political and commercial independence
- Radio jamming
