= Criticism of the BBC =

The British Broadcasting Corporation (BBC) took its present form on 1 January 1927 when John Reith became its first Director-General. Reith stated that impartiality and objectivity were the essence of professionalism in its broadcasting. Allegations that the corporation lacks impartial and objective journalism have been made by observers on both the left and the right of the political spectrum. Another area of criticism has been the mandatory licence fee, as commercial competitors argue the licence fee is unfair and limits their ability to compete with the BBC.

== 20th century ==
=== Thatcher government ===
Accusations of a left-wing bias were often made against the corporation by members of Margaret Thatcher's 1980s Conservative government. Steve Barnett wrote in The Observer in 2001 that in 1983, Stuart Young, the "accountant and brother of one of Thatcher's staunchest cabinet allies", David Young, was appointed as BBC chairman. After him, in 1986, came Marmaduke Hussey, a "brother-in-law of another Cabinet Minister.... According to the then Conservative Party chairman, Norman Tebbit, Hussey was appointed "to get in there and sort the place out". In 2006, Tebbit said: "The BBC was always against Lady Thatcher".

Mark Thompson, the director general of the BBC, said in 2010, "In the BBC I joined 30 years ago [as a production trainee, in 1979], there was, in much of current affairs, in terms of people's personal politics, which were quite vocal, a massive bias to the left. The organisation did struggle then with impartiality".

== 21st century ==
BBC News forms a major department of the corporation, and receives many complaints of bias. The Tufton Street-based Centre for Policy Studies (a free market orientated think tank) stated, "Since at least the mid-1980s, the Corporation has often been criticised for a perceived bias against those on the centre-right of politics". Similar allegations have been made by past and present employees such as Antony Jay, former editor of the Today programme Rod Liddle, and former correspondent Robin Aitken.

The former BBC journalist Andrew Marr remarked, "The BBC is not impartial or neutral. It's a publicly funded, urban organisation with an abnormally large number of young people, ethnic minorities, and gay people. It has a liberal bias, not so much a party-political bias. It is better expressed as a cultural liberal bias." Speaking to journalists at a Broadcasting Press Guild lunch in 2009, Jeremy Hunt, the then Shadow Secretary of State for Culture, Media and Sport, said that BBC News needed more people from the centre-right: "I wish they would go and actively look for some Conservatives to be part of their news-gathering team, because they have acknowledged that one of their problems is that people who want to work at the Corporation tend to be from the centre-left. That's why they have this issue with what Andrew Marr called an innate liberal bias".

A study by Cardiff University academics, which was funded by the BBC Trust, was published in August 2013 and examined the BBC's coverage of a broad range of issues. One of the findings was the dominance of party political sources; in coverage of immigration, the EU and religion, they accounted for 49.4% of all source appearances in 2007 and 54.8% in 2012. The data also showed that the Conservative Party received significantly more airtime than the Labour Party. In 2012, Conservative leader and then Prime Minister David Cameron outnumbered Labour leader Ed Miliband in appearances by a factor of nearly four to one (53 to 15), and governing Conservative cabinet members and ministers outnumbered their Labour counterparts by more than four to one (67 to 15).

In 2009, the former BBC director-general Greg Dyke criticised the BBC as part of a "Westminster conspiracy" to maintain the British political system.

Before the 2019 general election, the BBC was criticised for biased coverage that favoured the governing Conservative Party. Issue was taken with a clip used from a Question Time party leaders special episode in which the part showing audience laughter at Prime Minister Boris Johnson's response to a certain question was edited out. BBC officials addressed the issue and admitted their mistake. The BBC was also accused of subjecting Labour leader Jeremy Corbyn and Liberal Democrats leader Jo Swinson to gruelling interviews by Andrew Neil, but not requiring Johnson to go through the same and of arranging it beforehand. The Guardian columnist Owen Jones also took issue with the BBC rescinding its policy of not letting Johnson be interviewed by Marr unless he went through one with Neil. The BBC defended its decision to waive the requirement by citing national interest amidst a terror attack in London on 29 November 2019.

Some commentators, such as Peter Oborne in 2019, have argued that there is a culture of "client journalism" which had flourished due to a closeness between the BBC and the governing Conservative Party, which has led to their bias in favour of the establishment. For example, from 2008 to 2017, Robbie Gibb was head of the BBC Westminster and therefore in charge of the BBC's political programming. His brother, Nick Gibb, is a Conservative MP and Minister for Schools, and Robbie Gibb took a job with Theresa May as Director of Communications immediately after resigning from the BBC. The incoming Director-General as of September 2020, Tim Davie, is a former Conservative Party councillor. In addition, the new Chairman of the BBC, Richard Sharp, has donated over £400,000 to the Conservative Party since 2001. Among journalists, BBC Political Editor Laura Kuenssberg and ITV Political Editor Robert Peston have also been criticised for perceived "client journalism", as well as uncritically repeating stories from anonymous government sources as news, which later transpired to be false.

=== Racism ===
The BBC has also been accused of racism. In a speech to the Royal Television Society in 2008, Lenny Henry said that ethnic minorities were "pitifully underserved" in television comedy and that little had changed at senior levels in terms of ethnic representation during his 32 years in television. Jimmy McGovern, in a 2007 interview, called the BBC "one of the most racist institutions in England".

In 2001, BBC Director-General Greg Dyke said that the BBC was "hideously white" and acknowledged difficulties with "race relations". He acknowledged that it was having difficulties in retaining minority staff and outlined plans towards solving those problems.

Rageh Omaar, the Somali-born British journalist and former BBC war correspondent who reported the US-led invasion of Iraq in 2003, called BBC a "white man's club" after he resigned to join Al-Jazeera in 2006. Later, in 2007, while being interviewed by Hannah Pool of The Guardian, he accused the BBC of classism too.

The BBC, which is legally obliged to be an equal opportunities employer, had a 2012 target for 12.5% of its staff to be from a black or minority ethnic background (12% at 31 January 2009). The BBC's buildings are largely based in urban areas with a more diverse demography than the country as a whole (30% ethnic minority population in London and about 15% in the Manchester/Salford area), and the 12.5% figure is over 4% higher than the current percentage of ethnic minorities in the United Kingdom as a whole. However, many of its ethnic minority members of staff have been argued to be cleaners and security guards, not presenters and programme makers. The Guardian reported, "The BBC has pledged to increase the number of black, Asian and minority ethnic (BAME) people on air by more than 40% over the next three years and almost double the number of senior managers from those groups who work at the corporation by 2020".

In September 2019, the BBC's Editorial Complaints Unit upheld a complaint that television presenter Naga Munchetty breached their editorial guidelines in her criticism of racist comments made by US President Donald Trump about four US representatives. That decision was criticised by the BBC's black and ethnic minority (BAME) network, and 44 British actors, broadcasters and journalists of BAME origin wrote a letter to ask for the BBC to reconsider its decision. Ofcom initiated a parallel assessment of the decision. Her fellow cohost, Dan Walker, was also named in the initial complaint, but no action was taken by the BBC against him since the complainant's follow-up complaint focused solely on Munchetty. In response, Tony Hall, the Director-General of the BBC, intervened and reversed the decision to uphold the complaint on 30 September.

In July 2020, a BBC reporter used the word nigger in a report on the attack of a 21-year-old NHS worker and musician known as K-Dogg while reporting on what the assailants said during the attack. This led to complaints to the BBC about why it had not bleeped that word out or said "the N-word". It also led to questions about why a white person was even allowed to say that word. A few days later, the BBC also received criticism after airing the offensive language used by historian Lucy Worsley when quoting former American president Abraham Lincoln, on her documentary American History's Biggest Fibs which aired on BBC Two on 1 August 2020. The documentary first aired on BBC Four in 2019. The BBC has defended the use of the word nigger in response on 4 August 2020, saying it wanted to report the word allegedly used in the attack of K-Dogg, and this decision was supported by the family of the victim, but the corporation accepted that it did cause offence. On 8 August, Sideman, real name David Whitely, said he had decided to leave BBC Radio 1Xtra because of the use of the racial slur and the defence of it. The next day, 9 August, the BBC apologised over the use of nigger and said a mistake was made. Its director general Tony Hall said he now accepts the corporation should have taken a different approach.

=== Antisemitism ===
In August 2024, the BBC faced accusations of "gaslighting" more than 200 Jewish staff members, contributors, and suppliers over its handling of detailed complaints about antisemitism at the BBC. The group's complaints included a letter addressed to BBC Chair Samir Shah, urging an investigation into what they warned could constitute a serious institutional racism problem. Shah dismissed the calls for an investigation, commending instead the BBC for having an "inclusive" environment.

In 2025, Lord Mann, the Prime Minister's independent adviser on antisemitism, said that senior BBC leaders including Director-General Tim Davie had repeatedly turned down his offers to provide antisemitism training. Since taking on his role in 2019, Lord Mann had visited the BBC and made the offer on three occasions, but had been rejected each time. Lord Mann accused the BBC of an "arrogance at the top" and a failure to take seriously allegations of antisemitism and anti-Israel bias in its reporting.

2026 Holocaust coverage oversights: In January 2026, the BBC was criticized for separate editorial oversights in its Holocaust coverage. During Holocaust Memorial Day segments on BBC Breakfast on 27 January, presenters failed to explicitly identify Jewish victims among the “six million people murdered by the Nazi regime,” prompting criticism from advocacy groups and commentators; the BBC acknowledged the error and announced it would issue corrections online. Earlier, a BBC One The Repair Shop Christmas special about the Kindertransport did not mention that most of the children evacuated were Jewish; following criticism, the BBC added a clarification to the episode’s iPlayer description noting that the Kindertransport primarily involved Jewish children.

=== Homophobia ===
The Independent reported the findings of a University of Leeds study in March 2006, which accused the BBC of being "institutionally homophobic" towards "lesbian and gays, references to them, or related issues". The Leeds researchers found that out of 168 hours of programming, only 38 minutes (0.4%) dealt with gay and lesbian issues, and that 32 minutes (80%) was deemed negative. Focus groups used in the study accused the BBC of being the worst broadcaster in terms of gay and lesbian issues and their portrayal of the LGBT community.

In 2015, the BBC was criticised for shortlisting boxer Tyson Fury for Sports Personality of the Year, despite the controversial remarks that he had made on homosexuality, women and abortion. A BBC Northern Ireland journalist, Andy West, resigned from the BBC after he was suspended for publicly criticising the decision.

=== Transphobia ===
The BBC has been accused of being institutionally transphobic by politicians, journalists and the LGBTQ community.

In June 2020, a letter to expressing "serious concerns" about BBC coverage of transgender issues was sent to BBC News editor director Kamal Ahmed. The letter was signed by 150 people including MPs Crispin Blunt, Kirsty Blackman and Stewart McDonald. The letter complained that the BBC had engaged in "institutional discrimination" and had mishandled its obligation to balanced reporting in its coverage of stories about transgender issues. It claimed that BBC coverage included contributions from inappropriately hostile sources in a way that was not in keeping with the BBC's coverage of issues affecting other minority groups and that "anti-trans journalists (...) are given free rein to take potshots at trans people".

In October 2020, the BBC issued updated impartiality rules to its News staff which were criticised for treating LGBTQ rights issues as political matters on which BBC journalists and staff should not publicly take issues when acting in a personal capacity. Staff were also told that attending Pride events and supporting transgender rights could break impartiality requirements. Gay Times claimed that this cast LGBTQ identities as intrinsically political and called the guidelines "transphobia in sheep's clothing".

The BBC has also been criticised for removing all transgender support groups from its Advice Line pages.

In October 2021, an article published by BBC News under the title "'We're being pressured into sex by some trans women'" received substantial criticism as transphobic by the LGBTQ community, transgender-related charities, journalists, and BBC staff. Particular focus was put on the use of one source: cisgender lesbian adult film star Lily Cade, who the BBC had been informed prior to publication had been accused of multiple sexual assaults, and days after the article was published Cade wrote a blog post calling for the "lynching" of specific trans women. An open letter urging retraction gathered 20,000 signatures, while multiple protests took place outside BBC offices. Although the BBC article claims that several prominent transgender women were contacted for the story and "none of them wanted to speak to" the BBC journalist Caroline Lowbridge, transgender adult performer Chelsea Poe stated that this is "completely untrue", and that the interview she had with the journalist was excluded from the story, a claim supported by PinkNews's review of correspondence between Poe and Lowbridge, as well as a BBC source who said that Poe's interview was excluded due to an editorial decision that it lacked relevance.

In October 2026, the BBC faced criticism for digitally removing LGBTQ+ symbols from episodes of Strictly Come Dancing and University Challenge, including the transgender rights slogan "Protect the Dolls" on a shirt worn by Bethany Antonia, and the removal of pride flag pins worn by a member of the University of Leicester team. In these cases, the BBC claimed that the removals were due to the broadcaster's editorial policies, which discourage the wearing of "overt" branding such as slogans, flags, and symbols on-air regardless of context.

=== Safeguarding Impartiality in the 21st Century ===
A report commissioned by the BBC Trust, Safeguarding Impartiality in the 21st Century, published in June 2007, stressed that the BBC needed to take more care in being impartial. It said the BBC had broken its own guidelines by screening an episode of The Vicar of Dibley that promoted the Make Poverty History campaign. The bias was explained as the result of the BBC's liberal culture. A transcript of the impartiality seminar is included as a separately published appendix to the report available via the BBC Trust.

After press reports emerged that BBC employees had edited the Wikipedia article's coverage of the report, the BBC issued new guidelines banning BBC staff from "sanitising" Wikipedia articles about the BBC.

=== Immigration and European Union ===
In 2005, two independent reports deemed the BBC's coverage of the European Union to be rather inadequate and one of the reports noted a "cultural and unintentional bias".

In July 2013, a report commissioned by the BBC Trust found that the organisation had been slow to reflect widespread public concerns about immigration to the United Kingdom and shifts in public attitudes towards the European Union. The report, by Stuart Prebble, stated that Helen Boaden, the former director of BBC News, had said that when she arrived at the organisation, there had been a "deep liberal bias" in the handling of immigration issues. It also stated that, within the BBC, "the agenda of debate is probably too driven by the views of politicians" but that "overall the breadth of opinion reflected by the BBC on this subject is broad and impressive, and no persuasive evidence was found that significant areas of opinion are not given due weight today". It also stated that the BBC was "slow to give appropriate prominence to the growing weight of opinion opposing UK membership of the EU, but in more recent times has achieved a better balance".

In contrast, in 2018, former BBC (now ITV) journalist Robert Peston accused the organisation of not being "confident enough" in pointing out false arguments during the campaign and of giving a false balance of impartiality. Peston said that the organisation "put people on with diametrically opposed views and didn't give their viewers and listeners any help in assessing which one was the loony and which one was the genius.... Impartial journalism is not giving equal airtime to two people one of whom says the world is flat and the other one says the world is round".

=== Political correctness ===
Speaking at the China Exchange in Soho, the former BBC employee Jeremy Clarkson recalled when he was accused of being racist by the corporation: "Political correctness is tiresome. We really suffered from it terribly at the Beeb.... I remember being called in to see Danny Cohen... he said, 'I understand you have a new dog and you have called it Didier Dogba. It is racist'". In an interview with the Radio Times, Clarkson said, "It's become so up itself, suffocating the life out of everything with its nonsense need to be politically correct".

In a November 2020 episode of Jeremy Vine, activist Femi Oluwole questioned why BBC presenters were still permitted to wear remembrance poppies, following new impartiality guidance warning against "virtue signalling, no matter how worthy the cause", which had previously prevented staff from expressing support for Black Lives Matter and LGBT rights. That guidance had applied to the personal social media accounts of BBC staff.

== Allegations of bias ==
=== South Asia ===
Writing for the 2008 edition of the peer-reviewed Historical Journal of Film, Radio and Television, Alasdair Pinkerton analysed the coverage of India by the BBC from India's 1947 independence from British rule to 2008. Pinkerton observed a tumultuous history involving allegations of anti-India bias in the BBC's reportage, particularly during the Cold War, and concluded that the BBC's coverage of South Asian geopolitics and economics showed a pervasive and hostile anti-India bias because of the BBC's alleged imperialist and neocolonialist stance. In 2008, the BBC was criticised for referring to the men who carried out the 2008 Mumbai attacks as "gunmen", rather than "terrorists," used to describe the attacks in UK. In protest against the use of the word "gunmen" by the BBC, journalist M.J. Akbar refused to take part in an interview after the Mumbai attacks and criticised the BBC's reportage of the incident.

In 2011, the Cable Operators Association of Pakistan (COAP) accused BBC World News of "anti-Pakistan propaganda" and banned it, after it aired a documentary which accused Pakistan of failing to meet its commitments in the war on terror. BBC condemned the ban as an attack on its editorial independence and many Pakistanis criticised the ban as a violation of freedom of speech; while COAP responded that it was not legally obliged to allow foreign channels. Later, Pakistani PM Yousuf Raza Gilani called for more freedom of speech in Pakistan and that he wanted BBC to operate in Pakistan.

It alleged the Indian Army to have had stormed a sacred Muslim shrine, the tomb of Sheikh Noor-u-din Noorani in Charari Sharief and retracted the claim only after strong criticism.

A 2016 report from the BBC accused India of funding Pakistan's Muttahida Qaumi Movement and providing weapons and training to its militants, citing the statements of various Pakistani sources, including officials and a senior Karachi police officer. The report was rejected by both the Indian government and the MQM, and others, such as journalists Barkha Dutt. A 2017 study stated that the BBC story received considerable media attention in Pakistan, while it was downplayed by the media in India.

In 2019, the BBC (along with Reuters and Al Jazeera) reported that large scale protests had broken out in Indian Kashmir in response to the revocation of the special status of Jammu and Kashmir. The Indian government initially criticised these reports of being "fabricated", but later tweeted that the protests created widespread unrest.

A 2019 BBC report accused the Pakistan army of committing human rights abuses during Pakistan's war on terror in the Khyber Pakhtunkhwa province. The Pakistani armed forces rejected the report, and the Pakistani Ministry of Information registered a complaint with the British office of communications.

In 2021, a BBC interview with political scientist Christine Fair was interrupted and Fair dismissed by News presenter Philippa Thomas when Fair began to elaborate on links between Pakistan and the Taliban. This invited further accusations of pro-Pakistan bias on the part of the BBC on social media.

The BBC covered the 2025 Pahalgam attack & the resulting diplomatic crisis under the headline ''Pakistan suspends visas for Indians after deadly Kashmir attack on tourists'', which was pointed out to as being inherently biased against India and falsely portraying India as the aggressive side. The Indian government sent an official complaint letter to BBC India for its anti-Indian bias while covering the incident.

=== Israeli–Palestinian conflict ===
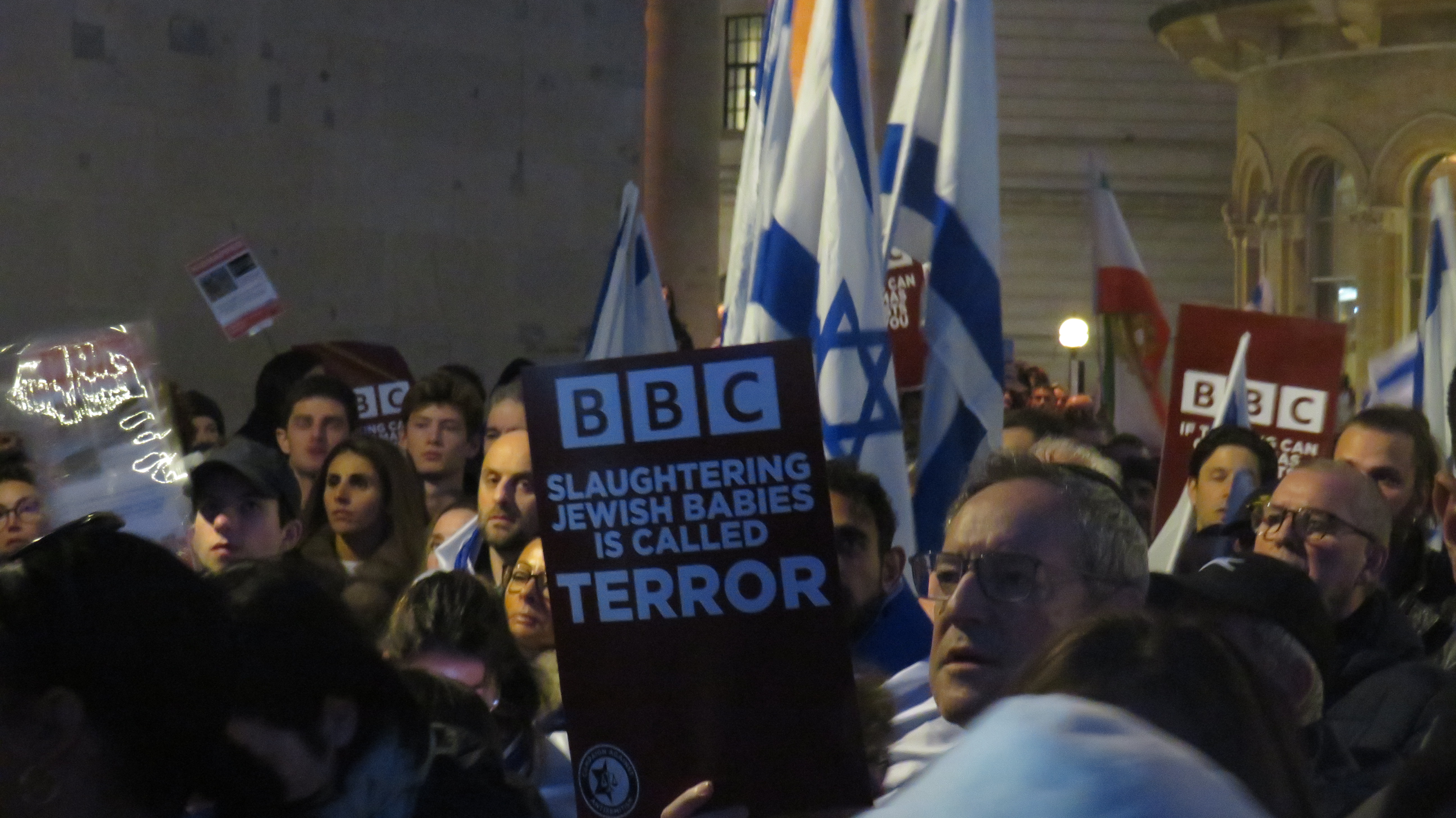
Pro-Israel protesters accusing the BBC of refusing to describe Hamas as a terrorist organisation during the 2023 Gaza war

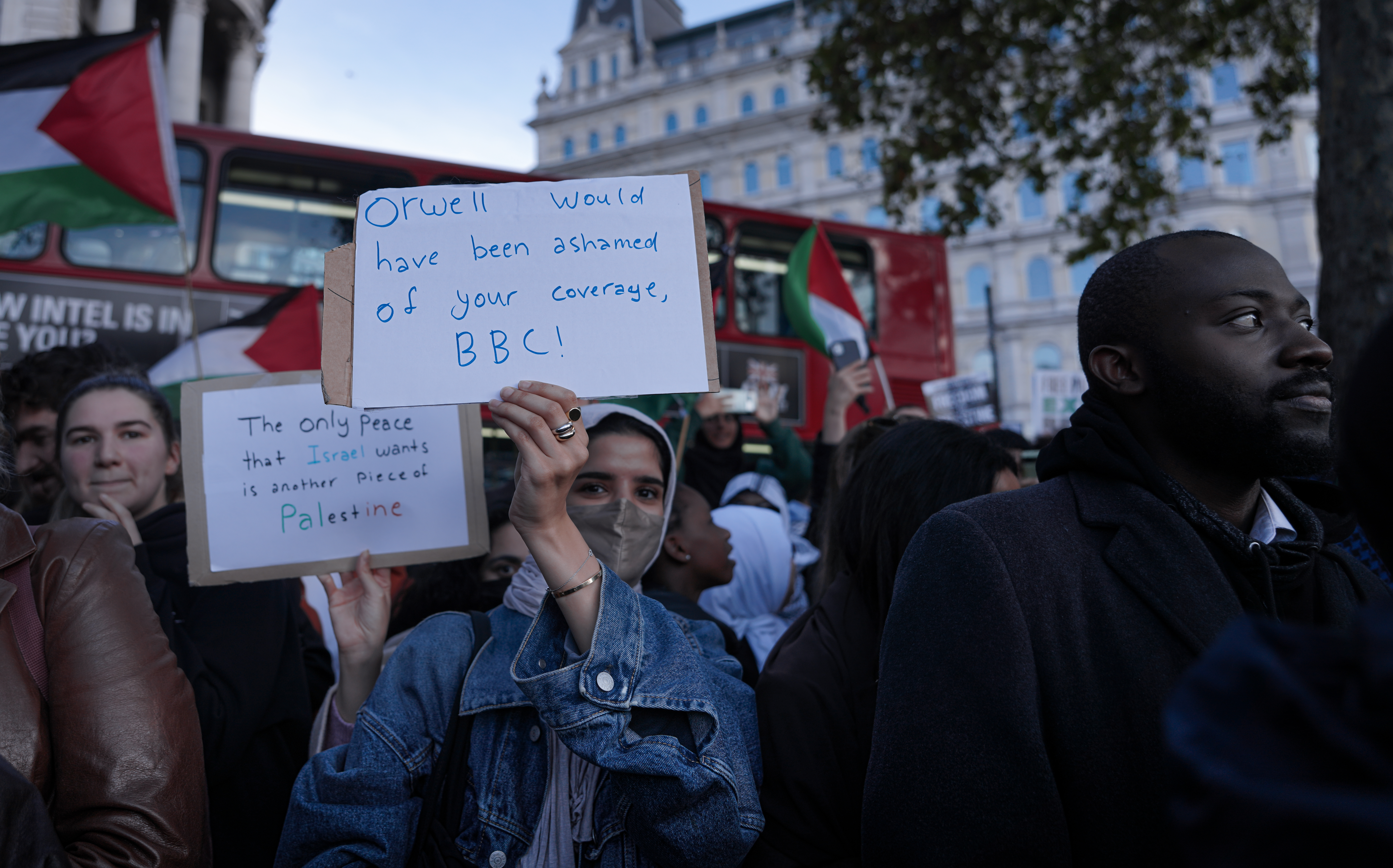
Pro-Palestinian protester accusing the BBC of pro-Israel bias during the 2023 Gaza war

Criticism of the BBC's Middle East coverage, especially those related to the Israeli–Palestinian conflict, from supporters of both Israel and the Palestinians led the BBC to commission an investigation and report from a senior broadcast journalist and senior editorial advisor Malcolm Balen that was referred to as the Balen Report and completed in 2004. The BBC's refusal to release the report under the Freedom of Information Act 2000 resulted in a long-running and ongoing legal case.

The BBC eventually overturned a ruling by the Information Tribunal that rejected the BBC's refusal to release the Balen Report to Steven Sugar, a member of the public, under the Freedom of Information Act on the grounds that it was held for the purposes of journalism. The report examines BBC radio and television broadcasts covering the Arab–Israeli conflict.

On 10 October 2006, The Daily Telegraph claimed, "The BBC has spent thousands of pounds of licence payers' money trying to block the release of a report which is believed to be highly critical of its Middle East coverage. The corporation is mounting a landmark High Court action to prevent the release of The Balen Report under the Freedom of Information Act, despite the fact that BBC reporters often use the Act to pursue their journalism. The action will increase suspicions that the report, which is believed to run to 20,000 words, includes evidence of anti-Israeli bias in news programming". The Times reported in March 2007 that "critics of the BBC" were interested in knowing if the Balen Report "includes evidence of bias against Israel in news programming".

After the 2004 report, the BBC appointed a committee chosen by the Governors and referred to by the BBC as an "independent panel report" to write a report for publication, which was completed in 2006. Chaired by the British Board of Film Classification president, Sir Quentin Thomas, the committee found that "apart from individual lapses, there was little to suggest deliberate or systematic bias" in the BBC's reporting of the Middle East. However, its coverage had been "inconsistent", "not always providing a complete picture" and "misleading", and the BBC had failed to report adequately the hardships of Palestinians living under the occupation. Reflecting concerns from all sides of the conflict, the committee highlighted certain identifiable shortcomings and made four recommendations, including the provision of a stronger editorial "guiding hand".

Of the report's findings regarding the dearth of BBC reporting of the difficulties faced by the Palestinians, Richard Ingrams wrote in The Independent, "No sensible person could quarrel with that judgement". Martin Walker, then the editor of United Press International, agreed that the report implied favouritism towards Israel but said that the suggestion "produced mocking guffaws in my newsroom" and went on to list a number of episodes of what he thought was the BBC's clear pro-Palestinian bias. Writing in Prospect magazine, the Conservative MP Michael Gove wrote that the report was neither independent nor objective.

A former BBC Middle East correspondent, Tim Llewellyn, wrote in 2004 that the BBC's coverage allowed Israel's view of the conflict to dominate, as was demonstrated by research conducted by the Glasgow Media Group.

Douglas Davis, the London correspondent of The Jerusalem Post, has accused the BBC of being anti-Israel. He wrote that the BBC's coverage of the Arab–Israeli conflict was a "portrayal of Israel as a demonic, criminal state and Israelis as brutal oppressors" and resembled a "campaign of vilification" that had delegitimised the State of Israel. "Anglicans for Israel", the pro-Israel pressure group, berated the BBC for apparent anti-Israel bias.

The Daily Telegraph has criticised the BBC for its coverage of the Middle East; in 2007, it wrote, "In its international and domestic news reporting, the corporation has consistently come across as naïve and partial, rather than sensitive and unbiased. Its reporting of Israel and Palestine, in particular, tends to underplay the hate-filled Islamist ideology that inspires Hamas and other factions, while never giving Israel the benefit of the doubt".

In April 2004, Natan Sharansky, Israel's Minister for Diaspora Affairs, wrote to the BBC to accuse its Middle East correspondent, Orla Guerin, as having a "deep-seated bias against Israel" after her description of the Israeli army's handling of the arrest of Hussam Abdo, who was captured with explosives strapped to his chest, as "cynical manipulation of a Palestinian youngster for propaganda purposes".

In March 2006, a report on the Arab-Israeli conflict on the BBC's online service was criticised in a BBC Governors Report as unbalanced and creating a biased impression. The article's account of United Nations Security Council Resolution 242 in 1967 concerning the Six-Day War between Israel and a coalition of Egypt, Jordan and Syria "suggested the UN called for Israel's unilateral withdrawal from territories seized during the six-day war, when in fact, it called for a negotiated 'land for peace' settlement between Israel and 'every state in the area'. The committee considered that by selecting only references to Israel, the article had breached editorial standards on both accuracy and impartiality".

During the 2006 Lebanon War, Israeli diplomatic officials boycotted BBC news programmes, refused interviews and excluded reporters from briefings because Israeli officials believed the BBC's reporting was biased: "the reports we see give the impression that the BBC is working on behalf of Hezbollah instead of doing fair journalism". Fran Unsworth, the head of BBC News gathering, defended the coverage in an article for Jewish News.com.

On 7 March 2008, the news anchor Geeta Guru-Murthy clarified significant errors in the BBC's coverage of the Mercaz HaRav massacre that had been exposed by media monitor Committee for Accuracy in Middle East Reporting in America. The correspondent Nick Miles had informed viewers that "hours after the attack, Israeli bulldozers destroyed his [the perpetrator's] family home". That was not the case, and other broadcasters showed the east Jerusalem home to be intact and the family commemorating its son's actions.

On 14 March 2008, the BBC accepted that in an article on its website of an IDF operation that stated, "The Israeli air force said it was targeting a rocket firing team.... UN Secretary-General Ban Ki-moon has condemned Israel's attacks on Palestinian civilians, calling them inappropriate and disproportionate", it should have made reference to what Ban Ki-moon said about Palestinian rocket attacks as well as to the excessive use of force by Israel. The article was also amended to remove the reference of Israeli 'attacks on civilians' as Ban's attributed comments were made weeks earlier to the UN Security Council and not in reference to that particular attack. In fact, he had never used such terminology.

The BBC received intense criticism in January 2009 for its decision not to broadcast a television appeal by aid agencies on behalf of the people of Gaza during the 2008–2009 Israel–Gaza conflict, on the grounds that it could compromise the BBC's journalistic impartiality. A number of protesters asserted that it showed pro-Israeli bias, and some analysts suggested that the BBC's decision in the matter derived from its concern to avoid anti-Israeli bias, as analysed in the Balen Report. Parties criticising the decision, included Church of England archbishops, British government ministers and even some BBC employees. More than 11,000 complaints were filed in a three-day span. The BBC's director general, Mark Thompson, explained that the BBC had a duty to cover the Gaza dispute in a "balanced, objective way" and was concerned about endorsing something that could "suggest the backing one side". Politicians such as Tony Benn broke the BBC's ban on the appeal and broadcast the Gaza appeal on BBC News: "If the BBC won't broadcast the appeal, then I'm going to do it myself". He added that "no one [working for the broadcaster] agrees with what the BBC has done".

When Peter Oborne and James Jones investigated the BBC's refusal to screen the appeal, they said they found it "almost impossible to get anyone to come on the record". They were told by organisations Disasters Emergency Committee, Amnesty International, Oxfam, Christian Aid, Save the Children Fund and the Catholic agency CAFOD that the topic was "too sensitive".

Mohamed El-Baradei, the head of the International Atomic Energy Agency, protested the BBC's decision by cancelling interviews scheduled with the company; El-Baradei claimed the refusal to air the aid appeal "violates the rules of basic human decency which are there to help vulnerable people irrespective of who is right or wrong". The BBC's chief operating officer, Caroline Thomson, affirmed the need to broadcast "without affecting and impinging on the audience's perception of our impartiality" and that in this case, it was a "real issue".

In response to perceived falsehoods and distortions in a BBC One Panorama documentary, 'A Walk in the Park', transmitted in January 2010, the British journalist Melanie Phillips wrote an open letter in the news magazine The Spectator to the Secretary of State for Culture, Jeremy Hunt, to accusing the BBC of "flagrantly biased reporting of Israel" and to urge the BBC to confront the "prejudice and inertia which are combining to turn its reporting on Israel into crude pro-Arab propaganda, and thus risk destroying the integrity of an institution".

In 2010, the BBC was accused of pro-Israel bias in its documentary about the Gaza flotilla raid. The BBC documentary concluded that Israeli forces had faced a violent premeditated attack by a group of hardcore activists, who intended to orchestrate a political act to put pressure on Israel. The programme was criticised as "biased" by critics of Israel, and the Palestine Solidarity Campaign questioned why the IDF boarded the ship at night if it had peaceful intentions. The eyewitness Ken O'Keefe accused the BBC of distorting the capture, medical treatment and ultimate release of three Israeli commandos into a story of heroic self-rescuing commandos. Anthony Lawson produced a 15-minute video detailing the BBC's alleged bias.

In March 2011, the MP Louise Bagshawe criticised the inaccuracies and omissions in BBC's coverage of the Itamar attack and questioned the BBC's decision not to broadcast the incident on television and barely on radio and its apparent bias against Israel. In his July 2012 testimony to the Parliament, the outgoing Director-General of the BBC Mark Thompson admitted that BBC "got it wrong".

A BBC Editorial Standards Findings issued in July 2011 found that a broadcast on Today on 27 September 2010 that stated, "At midnight last night, the moratorium on Israelis building new settlements in the West Bank came to an end. It had lasted for ten months" and had breached the accuracy guideline in respect of the requirement to present output "in clear, precise language", as in fact the moratorium on building new settlements had been in existence since the early 1990s and remained in place.

In December 2011, the BBC caused further controversy after censoring the word "Palestine" from a song played on BBC Radio 1Xtra.

During the 2012 Summer Olympics's country profiles pages, the BBC listed "East Jerusalem" as the capital of Palestine and did not list a capital for Israel. While all other country profile pages featured a representation of the country's flag, the Israeli page featured a picture of an Israeli soldier confronting another man, supposedly a Palestinian. After public outrage and a letter from Israeli government spokesperson Mark Regev, the BBC listed a "Seat of Government" for Israel in Jerusalem but added that most foreign embassies "are in Tel Aviv". It made a parallel change to the listing for "Palestine" by listing "East Jerusalem" as the "Intended seat of government". The picture of the Israeli soldier was removed as well and replaced with the Israeli flag.

In a response to a reader's criticism of the issue, the BBC replied that the complaints that prompted the changes were "generated by online lobby activity". The BBC was also noted for having no coverage about the campaign for the IOC to commemorate the 11 killed Israeli athletes from the Munich massacre at the 1972 Summer Olympics, which was met with repeated refusal by IOC President Jacques Rogge, despite the issue receiving much press from other major news networks.

According to the poll conducted by Jewish Policy Research on more than 4,000 respondents, nearly 80% of British Jews believe that BBC is biased against Israel. Only 14% of British Jews believe that BBC coverage of Israel is "balanced".

In 2013, the BBC was scheduled to broadcast a documentary film, Jerusalem: An Archaeological Mystery Story, but pulled the film "off the schedule at the last minute." The film "theorizes that many Jews did not leave Jerusalem after the destruction of the Temple, and that many modern-day Palestinians may be in part descended from those Jews". Simon Plosker of HonestReporting believed that the decision was made to avoid offending people who are ideologically opposed to Israel by broadcasting a documentary about Jewish history in the region. The BBC's explanation for the sudden schedule change was that the film did not fit with the theme of the season, which was archaeology.

In 2014, protesters presented an open letter from the Palestinian Solidarity Campaign, Stop the War Coalition, the Campaign for Nuclear Disarmament and other groups to Lord Hall, Director General of the BBC. The letter accused the broadcaster of presenting Israeli attacks on Gaza as a result of rocket fire from Hamas without giving any other context. The letter was signed by notable individuals, such as Noam Chomsky, John Pilger and Ken Loach.

In 2015, Fraser Steel, the head of the Editorial Complaints Unit of the BBC, upheld complaints that it had breached impartiality guidelines in an interview with Moshe Ya'alon, the Israeli defence minister. Ya'alon claimed on the Today programme that Palestinians "enjoy already political independence" and "have their own political system, government, parliament, municipalities and so forth" and that Israel had no desire "to govern them whatsoever". The Palestine Solidarity Campaign objected to these claims: "Palestinians don't have political independence. They live under occupation and, in Gaza, under siege". The filmmaker and activist Ken Loach sent a letter via the Campaign: "You understand, I'm sure, that this interview is a serious breach of the requirement for impartiality. Unlike all other Today interviews, the minister was allowed to speak without challenge. Why?"

After the June 2017 Jerusalem attack, the BBC reported, "Three Palestinians killed after deadly stabbing in Jerusalem". However, those Palestinians had actually been the assailants in the attack, which ended when the three were shot and killed by law enforcement officers. After being inundated with complaints, BBC News changed the online headline. In December 2025, after complaints from pro-Israeli media monitoring group CAMERA, the BBC acknowledged a 2021 BBC Arabic article on Hamas risked misleading readers by not clearly stating it was antisemitic and targets Jews, and amended it.

==== Gaza war ====
During the Gaza war, current and former British government ministers, Chief Rabbi Ephraim Mirvis, and four of Britain's most prominent lawyers criticised the BBC for describing Hamas as "militants" and "fighters" and not "terrorists" in its coverage of the conflict. John Simpson defended the decision, saying it showed the BBC was impartial. The BBC said in a statement: "Anyone watching or listening to our coverage will hear the word 'terrorist' used many times – we attribute it to those who are using it, for example, the UK Government. This is an approach that has been used for decades, and is in line with that of other broadcasters. The BBC is an editorially independent broadcaster whose job is to explain precisely what is happening 'on the ground' so our audiences can make their own judgement." BBC sports reporter Noah Abrahams resigned in protest against the BBC's refusal to use the term. Israeli president Isaac Herzog also criticised the BBC for not using the term, calling it "atrocious". Following a meeting with the Board of Deputies of British Jews, the BBC said it would describe Hamas as "a proscribed terrorist organisation by the UK government", and move away from describing Hamas as "militants" by default.

In October and November 2023, Israeli comedy show Eretz Nehederet aired several sketches in English, which criticised the BBC's alleged anti-Israel bias. One of the sketches depicts BBC coverage taking Hamas's claims at face value immediately, praising Hamas as "the most credible not-terrorist organization in the world", ignoring a terrorist who admits firing a rocket at their own hospital, satirising the BBC coverage of the Al-Ahli Arab Hospital explosion. Another sketch portrayed a sympathetic mock "interview" with Yahya Sinwar, stating "Hamas freedom fighters peacefully attacked Israel", and a mock BBC anchor saying Hamas is "left with no human shields at all! So unfair", later referring to Israeli babies who were taken hostage as "torturing him through sleep deprivation" and "occupying his house." The sketches went viral online.

During the war, six BBC News Arabic reporters were also taken off air during the conflict due to their pro-Palestine posts on social media. One affiliated freelancer is also under investigation by the BBC following reports by the pro-Israel Committee for Accuracy in Middle East Reporting and Analysis (CAMERA) group. BBC Arabic has been criticised for referring to areas within the internationally recognised territory of Israel (i.e. not within Palestinian territories) as Israeli settlements.

In November 2023, eight UK-based journalists employed by the BBC wrote to Al Jazeera to express their concern over the perceived double standard of the BBC's coverage of the war, contrasting it with the "unflinching" reporting on war crimes committed by Russia during its invasion of Ukraine. The journalists accused the corporation of omitting historical context and investing in humanising Israeli victims while failing to humanise Palestinian victims. Bassam Bounenni, a BBC North Africa correspondent, had resigned from the corporation in October due to what he saw as its support for Israel.

In September 2024, Israel-based lawyer Trevor Asserson (BBCWatch) published a report, conducted by a team of 20 lawyers and 20 data scientists, claiming that the BBC had violated its own editorial bias guidelines over 1500 times in its reporting on the Gaza war. The report analysed nine million words of BBC output, comparing the wording and focus it gives in coverage of Israelis and Palestinians, finding that the network, especially BBC Arabic, tended to dehumanise Israelis compared to Palestinians, and portray Israel as militaristic and aggressive, while downplaying, glorifying, or excusing terrorist acts by Hamas.

Al Jazeera English aired an interview with a former BBC journalist on an October 2024 episode of its program The Listening Post. The journalist said that an "integral part" of the BBC's editorial stance when she worked there was that "Israel has a right to defend itself". She also said that BBC staff were often averse to use of the word "genocide" (regarding the Gaza genocide).

In November 2024, 230 members of the media industry including 101 anonymous BBC staff wrote a letter to Tim Davie accusing the BBC of providing favourable coverage towards Israel and failing its own editorial standards by lacking "consistently fair and accurate evidence-based journalism in its coverage of Gaza". Notable signatories to the letter included Sayeeda Warsi, Juliet Stevenson, William Dalrymple, and John Nicolson. The letter highlighted a desire to see the "best possible journalism coming out of the region" and asked the BBC for:

... reiterating that Israel does not give external journalists access to Gaza, making it clear when there is insufficient evidence to back up Israeli claims, highlighting the extent to which Israeli sources are reliable, making clear where Israel is the perpetrator in article headlines, providing proportionate representation of experts in war crimes and crimes against humanity, including regular historical context predating October 2023, use of consistent language when discussing both Israeli and Palestinian deaths, and robustly challenging Israeli government and military representatives in all interviews.

In December 2024, journalist Owen Jones published an investigation on Drop Site News about the BBC's coverage of Israel's assault on Gaza. His report is based on interviews with 13 BBC journalists and staffers who claim that senior figures skewed stories in favour of Israel's narratives. Raffi Berg, BBC's Middle East editor, is presented as a central figure in "watering down everything that's too critical of Israel".

In February 2025, it was reported that the BBC had allegedly mistranslated or omitted the Arabic word for "Jews" when it was used by interviewees in the documentary Gaza: How to Survive a Warzone. An article in The Daily Telegraph compared the BBC's subtitling of Arabic dialogue to translations provided by the organisation CAMERA, and indicated that "on at least five occasions," the word "Yahud" (Arabic for "Jew" or "Jews") was either translated by the BBC as "Israel" or "Israeli forces," or was omitted from the subtitles altogether.

The film, which was pulled from BBC iPlayer after it was revealed that narrator's father is a Hamas technocratic official, translated each mention of the word "Jew" as "Israeli forces." A Gazan woman's statement, "the Jews invaded our area," was translated by the BBC to "the Israeli army invaded our area," while a Gazan boy telling an interviewer "the Jews came, they destroyed us, Hamas and the Jews" was subtitled as, "the Israelis destroyed everything, and so did Hamas." Later in the film, a woman said of Yahya Sinwar, per CAMERA's translation, that he "was engaging in resistance and jihad against the Jews"; the BBC translated this as, "he was fighting and resisting Israeli forces." Towards the end of the documentary, CAMERA translates the words of a woman speaking of Sinwar's death as, "He [Sinwar] was engaging in resistance and jihad against the Jews. Not underground." The BBC's subtitles translated the quote as, "The video shows that he was fighting and resisting Israeli forces." According to a BBC News article about the documentary and the ensuing controversy, "Some argue that the BBC covered up antisemitism. Others have claimed the subtitles are closer to what the speaker intends rather than a literal translation."

Orly Goldschmidt, a diplomat at the Israeli embassy in the UK, called the mistranslations "intentional" and emblematic of a broader trend, saying that the incident "reflects a serious and systematic problem at the BBC regarding its anti-Israel bias." Alex Hearn, co-director of Labour Against Anti-Semitism, called the translation of "Jews" into "Israelis" an example of "ongoing issues" with "sympathetic coverage of Hamas" by the BBC. He claimed that "the BBC have sanitised views expressed about Sinwar, orchestrator of the Hamas massacre, and instead presented a more acceptable version for a Western audience."

Journalist Brendan O'Neill criticised the translations as "a serious breach of broadcasting ethics," stating that "mistranslating the words of foreign interviewees is a huge no-no in journalism. It deceives viewers, blinding us to the truth of how other people think. As for turning invective about 'the Jews' into criticism of 'Israeli forces': that isn't journalism, it's propaganda."

In July 2025, more than 400 media figures, including 121 BBC journalists, signed an open letter to the BBC management claiming that much of the organisation's coverage is "defined by anti-Palestinian racism" as a result of being "crippled by the fear of being perceived as critical of the Israeli government". The letter names Robbie Gibb, a BBC Board and BBC's Editorial Standards Committee member with close ties to The Jewish Chronicle, as a steering force towards BBC's coverage and request his removal from the Board and the Editorial Standards Committee.

In November 2025, the BBC faced controversy over allegations of systemic editorial bias, following the release of a leaked internal memo by Michael Prescott, a former adviser to the BBC's Editorial Standards Committee. The memo raised concerns about the BBC's coverage of sensitive and politically charged issues over the years. As a result of these revelations, BBC Director-General Tim Davie and Head of News Deborah Turness resigned, facing extensive media criticism and public calls for reform.

=== Hutton inquiry into alleged whitewashed reporting of Iraq invasion ===
The BBC was criticised for its coverage of the events before the 2003 invasion of Iraq. The controversy over what it described as the "sexing up" of the case for war in Iraq by the government led to the BBC being heavily criticised by the Hutton Inquiry, although this finding was much disputed by the British press, who branded it as a government whitewash.

The BBC's chairman and its director general resigned after the inquiry, and Vice-chairman Lord Ryder made a public apology to the government, which the Liberal Democrat Norman Baker MP described as "of such capitulation that I wanted to throw up when I heard it".

=== Shallow and sensationalist reporting on Arab Spring ===
In June 2012, the BBC admitted making "major errors" in its coverage of the Arab Spring. In an 89-page report, 9 pages were devoted to the BBC's coverage of Bahrain and included admissions that the BBC had "underplayed the sectarian aspect of the conflict" and "not adequately convey the viewpoint of supporters of the monarchy" by "[failing] to mention attempts by Crown Prince" Salman bin Hamad Al Khalifa to "establish dialogue with the opposition". The report added that "the government appears to have made a good-faith effort to de-escalate the crisis", particularly while the BBC's coverage of the unrest dropped substantially, and many people had complained that their coverage was "utterly one-sided".

=== Anti-American bias ===
In October 2006, the Chief Radio Correspondent for BBC News since 2001 and Washington, DC, correspondent Justin Webb said that the BBC is so biased against America that Deputy Director-General Mark Byford had secretly agreed to help him to "correct" it in his reports and that the BBC treated America with scorn and derision and gave it "no moral weight".

In April 2007, Webb presented a three-part series for BBC Radio 4, Death to America: Anti Americanism Examined, in which he challenged a common perception of the United States as an international bully and a modern imperial power.

The conservative American news commentator Bill O'Reilly repeatedly sought to draw attention to what he calls the BBC's "inherent liberal culture".

=== Anti-Catholic bias ===
==== Hostility towards the Catholic Church ====
Prominent Catholic leaders have criticised the BBC for having an anti-Catholic bias and showing hostility towards the Catholic Church.

The BBC has also been criticised for recycling old news and for "insensitivity" and bad timing when it decided to broadcast the programmes Kenyon Confronts and Sex and the Holy City centred around sex scandals in the Catholic Church around the same time as Pope John Paul II's 25th anniversary and the beatification of Mother Teresa.

In 2003, the BBC had planned Popetown, a ten-part cartoon series which "featured an infantile Pope [...] bouncing around the Vatican on a pogostick". The plans were shelved after it evoked intense outrage and criticism from Catholic Christians.

==== Jerry Springer: The Opera ====
In January 2005, the BBC aired Jerry Springer: The Opera, ultimately resulting in around 55,000 complaints to the BBC from those upset at the opera's alleged blasphemies against Christianity. In advance of the broadcast, which the BBC had warned "contains language and content which won't be to some tastes", but mediawatch-uk's director, John Beyer, wrote to the director general to urge the BBC to drop the programme: "Licence fee payers do not expect the BBC to be pushing back boundaries of taste and decency in this way". The BBC issued a statement: "As a public service broadcaster, it is the BBC's role to broadcast a range of programmes that will appeal to all audiences – with very differing tastes and interests – present in the UK today".

Before the broadcast, some 150 people bearing placards had protested outside the BBC Television Centre in Shepherd's Bush. On the Monday after the broadcast, which was watched by some two million viewers, The Times announced that BBC executives had received death threats after their addresses and telephone numbers had been posted on the Christian Voice website. The BBC had received some 35,000 complaints before the broadcast but reported only 350 calls following the broadcast, which were split between those praising the production and those complaining about it.

One Christian group attempted to bring private criminal prosecutions for blasphemy against the BBC, and another demanded a judicial review of the decision.

In March 2005, the Board of Governors of the BBC convened and considered the complaints, which were rejected by 4 to 1.

=== Pro-Muslim bias ===
==== Blaspheming other faiths but refusing to publish Muhammad cartoons ====
Subsequent to anti-Christianity blasphemous reporting by BBC, its refusal to reproduce the actual Muhammad cartoons in its coverage of the controversy convinced many that the BBC follows an unstated policy of freely broadcasting defamation of Christianity but not Islam.

==== Disproportionate reporting on Muslims over other faiths ====
Hindu and Sikh leaders in the United Kingdom have accused the BBC of pandering to Britain's Muslim community by making a disproportionate number of programmes on Islam at the expense of covering other Asian religions, such as Sikhism and Hinduism. In a letter sent in July 2008 to the Network of Sikh Organisations (NSO), the head of the BBC's Religion and Ethics, Michael Wakelin, denied any bias. A spokesman for the BBC said that it was committed to representing all of Britain's faiths and communities.

A number of MPs, including Rob Marris and Keith Vaz, called on the BBC to do more to represent Britain's minority faiths. "I am disappointed," said Vaz. "It is only right that as licence fee payers all faiths are represented in a way that mirrors their make-up in society. I hope that the BBC addresses the problem in its next year of programming".

In October 2019, Indarjit Singh left Thought for the Day on BBC Radio 4 and accused the BBC of "a misplaced sense of political correctness", and prejudice against Sikhs. An item commemorating Guru Tegh Bahadur of the Sikh faith who had been executed by the Mughal Emperor Aurangzeb for opposing the forced conversion of Hindus to Islam in India in the 17th century had been prevented from being broadcast by the BBC "because it might offend Muslims" although it contained no criticism of Islam.

==== BBC reporter's tears for Yasser Arafat ====
During the BBC programme From Our Own Correspondent broadcast on 30 October 2004, Barbara Plett described herself as crying when she saw a frail Yasser Arafat being evacuated to France for medical treatment. That led to "hundreds of complaints" to the BBC, and suggestions that the BBC was biased. Andrew Dismore, the MP for Hendon, accused Plett of "sloppy journalism" and commented that "this shows the inherent bias of the BBC against Israel".

BBC News defended Plett in a statement by saying that her reporting had met the high standards of "fairness, accuracy and balance" expected of a BBC correspondent. Initially, a complaint of bias against Plett was rejected by the BBC's head of editorial complaints. However, almost a year later, on 25 November 2005, the programme complaints committee of the BBC governors partially upheld the complaints by ruling that Plett's comments "breached the requirements of due impartiality". Despite initially issuing a statement in support of Plett, the BBC Director of News, Helen Boaden, later apologised for what she described as "an editorial misjudgment". The governors praised Boaden's speedy response and reviewed the BBC's stance on the Israeli–Palestinian conflict.

==== Suppression of Kriss Donald murder coverage ====
On 15 March 2004, a 15 year old Scottish school boy was kidnapped, tortured, stabbed multiple times, and then burnt alive by a gang of British Muslim men of Pakistani origin. The BBC were criticised by some viewers because the case featured on national news only three times and the first trial was later largely confined to regional Scottish bulletins including the verdict itself. Although admitting that the BBC had "got it wrong", the organisation's Head of Newsgathering, Fran Unsworth, largely rejected the suggestion that Donald's race played a part in the lack of reportage, instead claiming it was mostly a product of "Scottish blindness". In preference to reporting the verdict the organisation found the time to report the opening of a new arts centre in Gateshead in its running order. The BBC again faced criticisms for its failure to cover the second trial in its main bulletins, waiting until day 18 to mention the issue and Peter Horrocks of the BBC apologised for the organisation's further failings.

==== Secret Agent British National Party documentary ====
On 15 July 2004, the BBC broadcast a documentary The Secret Agent, on the far-right British National Party where undercover reporter Jason Gwynne infiltrated the BNP by posing as a football hooligan. The programme resulted in Mark Collett and Nick Griffin, the leader of the party, being charged for inciting racial hatred in April 2005 for statements that included Griffin describing Islam as a "wicked, vicious faith," Collett describing asylum seekers as "a little bit like cockroaches" and saying "let's show these ethnics the door in 2004". Griffin and Collett were found not guilty on some charges at the first trial in January 2006, but the jury failed to reach a verdict on the others and so a retrial was ordered.

At the retrial held in November 2006, all of the defendants were found not guilty on the basis that the law did not consider those who followed Islam or Christianity to be a protected group with respect to racial defamation laws. Shortly after this case, British law was amended to outlaw incitement to hatred against a religious group by the Racial and Religious Hatred Act 2006. The BNP believed that it was an attempt to "Discredit the British National Party as a party of opposition to the Labour government". After the second trial, Griffin described the BBC as a "Politically correct, politically biased organisation which has wasted licence-fee payers' money to bring two people in a legal, democratic, peaceful party to court over speaking nothing more than the truth". The BBC stated in turn that it was their obligation to inform the public of matters of general interest.

=== Anti-Muslim bias ===
==== Asian network ====
In 2008, staff at the BBC's Asian radio station complained of anti-Muslim discrimination by a "mafia of executives", which required the BBC to launch an internal investigation. Staff claimed that Hindus and Sikhs were being favoured over Muslim presenters and reporters.

==== Disparity in coverage of Islamophobia ====
One of Britain's largest Muslim representative bodies accused the BBC of "failing to sufficiently report" on Islamophobia in the Conservative Party. The complaint was addressed to the BBC Director General, Tony Hall, in a letter by the Muslim Council of Britain. The MCB reminded Hall of the BBC's responsibility as a public broadcaster to be impartial and not to create a hierarchy of racism through its biased coverage: "Racism against Muslims should be given equal importance to racism against others".

On 6 June 2018, the independent online media outlet Evolvepolitics released an article highlighting the disparity in BBC media coverage of anti-Semitism in UK Labour and that of Islamophobia in the Conservatives. The article demonstrated that the BBC website had about 50 times the amount of search results dedicated to anti-Semitism in the Labour Party as for Islamophobia in the Conservative Party. All outlets have given a far higher amount of coverage to Labour anti-Semitism compared to that of Tory Islamophobia: the BBC have covered this over ten times more.

==== Catering primarily for Christians ====
The BBC's head of religion, Aaqil Ahmed, accused the BBC of neglecting Muslims, Hindus and Sikhs in its religious programming and catering primarily for Christians in 2016.

=== Reporting of sexual abuse scandals of BBC staffers ===
In the weeks after the ITV1 documentary Exposure: The Other Side of Jimmy Savile was broadcast on 3 October 2012, the BBC faced questions and criticism over allegations that it had failed to act on rumours about sexual assaults, especially on young girls, by presenter Jimmy Savile, some of which had occurred on BBC premises after the recording of programmes, including Top of the Pops and Jim'll Fix It. Allegations were also made that a Newsnight investigation into Savile in December 2011 was dropped because it conflicted with tribute programmes prepared after his death.

By 11 October 2012 allegations of abuse by Savile had been made to 13 British police forces, and on 19 October Scotland Yard launched a formal criminal investigation into historic allegations of child sex abuse by Savile and others over four decades. The police reported on 25 October 2012 that the number of possible victims was 300.

It was claimed that Douglas Muggeridge, the controller of BBC Radio in the early 1970s, was aware of allegations against Savile and had asked for a report on them in 1973. The BBC stated that no evidence of any allegations of misconduct or of actual misconduct by Savile had been found in its files and later denied that there had been a cover-up of Savile's activities. There were claims by some, including DJ Liz Kershaw, who joined BBC Radio 1 in 1987, that the culture in the BBC tolerated sexual harassment.

The BBC was criticised in the UK Parliament for its handling of the affair, with Harriet Harman stating that the allegations "cast a stain" on the corporation. Culture Secretary Maria Miller said that she was satisfied that the BBC was taking the allegations very seriously and dismissed calls for an independent inquiry. Labour leader Ed Miliband said that an independent inquiry was the only way to ensure justice for those involved. George Entwistle offered to appear before the Parliamentary Culture, Media and Sport Committee to explain the BBC's position and actions.

On 16 October, the BBC appointed the heads of two inquiries into events surrounding Savile. Former High Court judge Dame Janet Smith, who led the inquiry into serial killer Harold Shipman, would review the culture and practices of the BBC when Savile was working there, and Nick Pollard, a former Sky News executive, would look at why a Newsnight investigation into Savile's activities was dropped shortly before its transmission.

A Panorama investigation was broadcast on 22 October 2012. The director-general of the BBC, George Entwistle, declined to be interviewed, citing legal advice that BBC senior management should co-operate only with the police, the BBC reviews and Parliament. On the same day, the BBC announced that Newsnight editor Peter Rippon would "step aside" from his position with immediate effect. On 23 October, Entwistle appeared before the Parliamentary Culture, Media and Sport Committee at which he faced hostile questioning and stated that it had been a "catastrophic mistake" to cancel the Newsnight broadcast.

In the context of the Savile scandal, a book written in 1999 by journalist John Simpson, Strange Places, Questionable People, was noted to have referred to an "Uncle Dick" at the BBC who had sexually assaulted children and appeared to fit the profile of BBC announcer Derek McCulloch. The author Andrew O'Hagan wrote that there had long been rumours about McCulloch's activities and those of his colleague Lionel Gamlin while they worked at the BBC in the 1940s and 1950s. The BBC said that it would "look into these allegations as part of the Jimmy Savile review". McCulloch's family described the allegations as "complete rubbish".

Newsnight broadcast on 2 November 2012 a report making allegations against an unnamed "prominent Thatcher era Conservative politician" in relation to the North Wales child abuse scandal. The story collapsed after The Guardian reported on 8 November a case of mistaken identity and the next day, the victim retracted the allegation. An apology was included in Newsnight on 9 November, and Newsnight investigations were suspended. George Entwistle stated that he was unaware of the content of the report before it was broadcast and stated that Newsnight staff involved in the broadcast could be disciplined. However, Entwistle himself resigned on 10 November, after facing further criticism in the media. The director of BBC Scotland, Ken MacQuarrie, investigated the circumstances around the Newsnight programme. His findings were published on 12 November and concluded that there had been "a lack of clarity around the senior editorial chain of command" and that "some of the basic journalistic checks were not completed".

Nick Pollard's report into the shelving of a Newsnight report on Savile in 2011 was published in December 2012. It concluded that the decision to drop the original report was "flawed" and that it had not been done to protect programmes prepared as tributes to Savile. His report criticised Entwistle for apparently failing to read emails warning him of Savile's "dark side" and stated that after the allegations against Savile eventually became public, the BBC fell into a "level of chaos and confusion [that] was even greater than was apparent at the time".

On 20 December 2012, the House of Commons Public Accounts Committee published criticism of payments made to Entwistle after he had resigned and called the £450,000 paid to him after 54 days in post, double the amount specified in his contract, together with a year's health insurance and additional payments, to be a "cavalier" use of public money.

=== "London-centrism": Lack of national representation ===
On 1 November 2007, it was reported that Sir Michael Lyons, the chairman of the BBC Trust, criticised the BBC as too London-centric and paying less attention to news stories outside the capital. In light of such criticism in terms of both news and general programming and in recognition of its mandate to represent the entire UK and to encourage creativity throughout the country, active efforts have been made by the Trust and Board of Governors to correct the regional imbalance. That is reflected in a commitment to produce at least half of programmes outside Greater London, a target that the BBC achieved in 2013 and 2014 but fell short of in 2015.

The BBC's annual report for 2015–2016 refers to the "London bubble" and claims that it represents not an active bias but the fact that London is where so many decisions and programming are made. While notable investments in production capacity outside London have been made, such as the creation of MediaCityUK in Salford, Greater Manchester, spending figures for regional radio and television production has fallen in real terms. That accompanied a reduction of nearly £600 million in funding for the BBC as a whole since 2010.

The UK's move towards increased devolution in the areas of healthcare, education and a range of other policy areas has created additional challenges for the BBC. The flagship newscasts are based in London and tend to report "nation-wide" stories related to government and policy that often pertain only England or sometimes England and Wales. The BBC Trust and Future for Public Service Television Inquiry recognised that it requires more clarity in UK-wide news programming (for example, by explaining that the Junior Doctors Strike affected only England or that Scotland and Northern Ireland are exempt from the bedroom tax and the funding changes leading to the 2010 student protests), and it creates an additional responsibility for the home nations to report on devolved matters. From 2016, BBC management would go before the devolved committees for culture or media to answer questions and criticism, just as for the Westminster Culture, Media, and Sport Committee.

In August 2007, Adam Price, a Plaid Cymru MP, highlighted what he perceived as a lack of a Welsh focus on BBC news broadcasts. Price threatened to withhold future television licence fees in response to a lack of thorough news coverage of Wales and echoed a BBC Audience Council for Wales July report that cited public frustration over how the Welsh Assembly is characterised in national media.

=== Scottish coverage ===
The National Union of Journalists criticised the BBC in October 2012 for its poor coverage of the Scotland independence referendum, which took place on 18 September 2014. The BBC reportedly "downplayed the costs of referendum coverage, claiming it was a 'one off'". According to a research team led by Dr John Robertson from the University of the West of Scotland, the BBC's first year of referendum coverage, until September 2013, was biased towards the unionist No campaign.

Andrew Marr, the BBC presenter, was accused of expressing anti-independence views in a March 2014 interview with Alex Salmond. The BBC allowed the Better Together campaign to make a unionist cinema advertisement at its Glasgow studios in April 2014, which was thought to contravene its editorial guidelines. According to The Scotsman, the BBC appointed Kezia Dugdale, Labour's education spokeswoman, as presenter of Crossfire, a radio programme debating issues relating to the referendum. The newspaper believed the arrangement to be also a breach of the BBC's guidelines and asserted that Dugdale is "a member of Scottish Labour's Truth Team – set up to monitor all SNP and Yes Scotland interviews, press statements and briefing papers" in the runup to the September vote.

A report by the Audience Council Scotland, the BBC Trust's advisory body in Scotland, questioned the impartiality of BBC Scotland in covering the independence referendum in July 2014. A Sunday Times article, also in July 2014, queried the BBC's approach to the independence referendum and stated that emails by a senior member of a BBC production company organising debates gave advance notice to the No campaign.

On 10 September 2014, the BBC was accused of bias in its reporting of an Alex Salmond press conference for the international media. In a response to a question by the BBC's Nick Robinson, Salmond accused him of heckling and wanted an inquiry by the British Cabinet Secretary into a leak to the BBC from the Treasury onplans of the Royal Bank of Scotland to relocate its registered office to London, which had been in the previous evening's news. In response to complaints on editing live coverage of the conference for later bulletins, the BBC said: "The BBC considers that the questions were valid and the overall report balanced and impartial, in line with our editorial guidelines".

After a day of protests from Yes campaigners and demands for Robinson to be sacked, the following Monday (15 September), Salmond responded to questions from journalists at Edinburgh Airport. About Robinson's report in later bulletins, he said: "I don't think it was fair for Nick to suggest that I hadn't answered a question when I actually answered it twice". He did not believe that Robinson should be sacked.

The former BBC correspondent Paul Mason was reported in September 2014 to have been critical of the BBC's reporting on his Facebook page that had been intended to be read only by his friends: "Not since Iraq have I seen BBC News working at propaganda strength like this. So glad I'm out of there".

Channel 4's director of creative diversity, Stuart Cosgrove called for a rethink at the BBC on the nature of balance and due impartiality. That was during a BBC Scotland radio conversation hosted by John Beattie. Cosgrove commented, "Yesterday, I was watching the rolling BBC News very closely and it was clear that notions of balance were being predicated on a party political basis. It would go from Cameron to Miliband to Clegg and back. If you look at it as a different premise – it's a yes/no question – then Patrick Harvie of the Scottish Greens, who is not the leader but is a significant political person within the Yes campaign, should have had exactly the same coverage as Ed Miliband. Do you think for a second he got that? Of course he didn't. I think there's been a failure of the understanding of the nature of balance and due impartiality. It's simply wrong and not acceptable".

An interview of Salmond for the Sunday Herald published on 14 September 2014 included his opinion that the BBC had displayed a unionist bias during the referendum.

=== Reform coverage ===
In September 2025, the BBC came under criticism after a Cardiff University study found that the BBC covered Reform UK in around a quarter of its news bulletins in the first half of the year, as compared to just 17.9% for the Liberal Democrats (UK), the third largest party. The same month, the Liberal Democrats launched a campaign to 'Balance the BBC', while also reporting the broadcaster to Ofcom. Another analysis by Be Broadcast’s Mission Control and political comms experts Cast From Clay also showed sharply disproportionate coverage of Reform. BBC director general Tim Davie has pushed back against the charges of unbalanced coverage.

== Inaccuracy and misrepresentation ==
=== Inaccurate reporting by Jeremy Bowen ===
In April 2009, the Editorial Standards Committee of the BBC Trust published a report on three complaints brought against two news items involving Jeremy Bowen, the Middle East Editor for BBC News. The complaints included 24 allegations of inaccuracy or partiality, of which three were fully or partially upheld. The BBC Trust's editorial standards committee found that Bowen's radio piece "had stated his professional view without qualification or explanation, and that the lack of precision in his language had rendered the statement inaccurate" and that the online article should have explained the existence of alternative views and that it had breached the rules of impartiality. However, the report did not accuse Bowen of bias. The website article was amended, and Bowen did not face any disciplinary measures.

=== Primark and child labour fake news ===
In 2011, after three years of Primark's effort, the BBC acknowledged that a Panorama report of Indian child labour use by the retailing company included footage that was probably fake. The BBC apologised to Primark, Indian suppliers and its viewers.

=== "Terrorist house" misrepresentation story ===
In January 2016, stories originating from the BBC alleged that the Lancashire Constabulary had taken a young Muslim child away for questioning on anti-terrorism charges after he accidentally spelled "terraced house" as "terrorist house". The story was widely reported in the British and international media. The police force in question criticised the BBC's coverage of the story by stating that it was "untrue to suggest that this situation was brought about by a simple spelling mistake" and adding that the incident "was not responded to as a terror incident and the reporter was fully aware of this before she wrote her story" and that "the media needs to take more responsibility when sensationalising issues to make stories much bigger than they are and to realise the impact they can have on local communities". A statement from the police and local council also said that it was "untrue to suggest that this situation was brought about by a simple spelling mistake. The school and the police have acted responsibly and proportionately in looking into a number of potential concerns using a low-key, local approach". Other pieces of work by the student, including one where the child wrote about his uncle beating him, were allegedly other reasons for the police questioning over the safety of the child.

=== One-sided documentary on racism during Euro 2012 ===
Eleven days before the tournament took place, the BBC's current affairs programme Panorama, entitled Euro 2012: Stadiums of Hate, included recent footage of supporters chanting various racist slogans and displays of white power symbols and banners in Poland and Nazi salutes and the beating of South Asians in Ukraine. The documentary was first commented widely in the British press but was accused of being one-sided, biased and unethical. Critics included the British media, anti-racism campaigners, and black and Jewish community leaders in Poland, Polish and Ukrainian politicians and journalists, England fans visiting the host nations and footballers (Gary Lineker, Roy Hodgson and others). Jonathan Ornstein, the leader of the Jewish community in Kraków and a Jewish source used in the documentary, said: "I am furious at the way the BBC has exploited me as a source. The organization used me and others to manipulate the serious subject of anti-Semitism for its own sensationalist agenda... the BBC knowingly cheated its own audience – the British people – by concocting a false horror story about Poland. In doing so, the BBC has spread fear, ignorance, prejudice and hatred. I am profoundly disturbed by this unethical form of journalism".

A reporter from Gazeta Wyborcza, Poland's biggest left-wing newspaper, questioned Panorama's practices and stated, "I am becoming more and more surprised with what the BBC says. So far it has denied two situations I witnessed. I would not be surprised if the BBC prepared a statement saying that the Panorama crew has never been to Poland".

The anti-racism campaigner Jacek Purski said, "The material prepared by the BBC is one-sided. It does not show the whole story of Polish preparations for the Euros. It does not show the Championship ran a lot of activities aimed at combating racism in the 'Respect Diversity' campaign. For us the Euro is not only about matches. The event has become an opportunity to fight effectively against racism and promote multiculturalism. There is no country in Europe free from racism. These are the facts".

The nations fined by UEFA for racism were not the hosts but the visitors from Spain, Croatia, Russia and Germany. The Royal Dutch Football Association issued a complaint to UEFA after monkey chants were thought to be aimed at their black players during an open training session in Kraków, but UEFA denied the chants were racially motivated.

=== False claims about Ukrainian president Petro Poroshenko ===
In 2019, the BBC agreed to pay damages after being sued by the then-president of Ukraine Petro Poroshenko for publishing libellous reports that Poroshenko had made a $400,000 bribe to Michael Cohen, lawyer of President Donald Trump. The BBC apologised and admitted that the story was not true.

=== Defamation of former Sinn Féin leader Gerry Adams ===
In 2025, Gerry Adams, the former leader of Sinn Féin won €100,000 in damages in one of the most expensive legal cases the BBC has fought. The programme and associated article published statements from an anonymous source suggesting that Gerry Adams had sanctioned the murder of Denis Donaldson. A jury found that the BBC had not acted in good faith and in a "fair and reasonable" way.

=== Coverage of China ===
In 2020, in the journal of Theory and Practice in Language Studies, an article written by authors from Guilin University of Technology in China, detailed that many BBC documentaries on China used largely negative language to describe Chinese culture, often portrayed simplistically and superficially. They were found to be enabling stereotypes about China.

In December 2021, the BBC published an English and a Chinese-language version of a 17-minute video on the city of Wuhan one year after its handling of the COVID-19 pandemic. In response, the BBC was targeted by "Chinese trolls and fake news websites", which cybersecurity company Recorded Future says are "likely state-sponsored", claiming the broadcaster had applied "a gloomy or 'underworld' filter" to the imagery in its reports to make the country look "dull and lifeless". Foreign Affairs ministry official Zhao Lijian and Chinese state media outlets have repeated allegations of a "gloom filter." The Global Times posted a comparison between the Chinese version and English versions of the BBC video, pointing out a difference in coloration between the two.

== Thailand: The Dark Side of Paradise ==
Thailand: The Dark Side of Paradise is a 2025 BBC Three documentary series about tourist destinations in Thailand, focusing particularly on Bangkok, Phuket, and Pattaya; directed by Zachary Bailess and hosted by Zara McDermott. The series was released online on 8 September 2025. The series was heavily criticized for inaccurate portrayals of Thailand's safety.

The documentary posits Thailand as an increasingly popular destination for young Brits. The series begins in Bangkok, and includes visits to Khaosan Road and Soi Cowboy, and later to the country's islands. Members of the filming team were allegedly nearly arrested by Thai police for filming in Soi Cowboy, known as a red light district. The series also interviews influencers, such as Mike Yu, a young British expatriate described as living a "life of luxury", and Mac, a British YouTuber in Pattaya from the channel Mac TV Travel Learn Inspire. Mac creates YouTube content with his girlfriend named Beverly Hills.

The series was heavily criticized for inaccurate portrayals of Thailand's safety. On 13 September 2025, influencer Mike Yu issued an apology for appearing in the series on Instagram, stating he was unaware the documentary would focus on the negative aspects of Thailand. Mac also characterized the series as BBC pushing a "woke narrative."

== Organizational practices ==
=== Climate change ===
The BBC has been criticised for hypocrisy over its high carbon footprint despite the amount of coverage that it gives to the topic of climate change. Newsnight presenter Jeremy Paxman argued that its correspondents "travel the globe to tell the audience of the dangers of climate change while leaving a vapour trail which will make the problem even worse". Paxman further argues that the 'BBC's coverage of the issue abandoned the pretence of impartiality long ago'.

At the 2007 Edinburgh International Television Festival, Peter Horrocks, the head of television news, and Peter Barron, the editor of Newsnight, said that the BBC should not campaign on climate change. They criticised the proposed plans for a BBC Comic Relief-style day of programmes on climate change. Horrocks was quoted as saying, "I absolutely don't think we should do that because it's not impartial. It's not our job to lead people and proselytise about it". Barron was quoted as adding, "It is absolutely not the BBC's job to save the planet. I think there are a lot of people who think that, but it must be stopped".

The plans for a day of programmes on environmental issues were abandoned in September 2007. A BBC spokesperson said that it was "absolutely not" because of concerns about impartiality.

In July 2011, a BBC Trust review cited findings of an assessment by Professor Steve Jones of University College London. Jones found there was sometimes an "over-rigid" application of the editorial guidelines on impartiality in relation to science coverage, which failed to take into account what he regarded as the "non-contentious" nature of some stories and the need to avoid giving "undue attention to marginal opinion". Jones gave reporting of the safety of the MMR vaccine and more recent coverage of claims about the safety of genetically-modified crops and the existence of man-made climate change as examples. In 2017, the BBC apologised for allowing a climate change denier, Nigel Lawson, to claim that global temperatures had not risen in the past decade on BBC Radio 4's Today Programme without being challenged with the fact that temperatures had risen. The organisation acknowledged breached its editorial guidelines. and in 2018, Carbon Brief released an internal notice sent by Fran Unsworth, the BBC director of news and current affairs, that argued that the BBC's coverage of climate change often went against its own guidelines on accuracy and created a false balance with regard to impartiality: "Manmade climate change exists: If the science proves it we should report it. ... To achieve impartiality, you do not need to include outright deniers of climate change in BBC coverage, in the same way you would not have someone denying that Manchester United won 2–0 last Saturday. The referee has spoken".

The BBC is alleged to have attempted to cover up a climate change seminar that is credited with shaping its coverage of the environment.

=== Overstaffing ===
The BBC has been criticised for "overstaffing" news, sporting and cultural events and in doing so, both wasting licence fee money and using its dominant position to control the coverage of events.

A 2010 House of Commons Public Accounts Committee report criticised the number of staff that the BBC had sent to sporting events such as the Beijing Olympics and the Euro 2008 football championships. In June 2011, the BBC sent 263 staff to cover the Glastonbury Festival. The next month, it sent 250 staff members to cover an event marking one year until the start of the London 2012 Olympics, ten times the numbers that were used by other broadcasters.

On 19 October 2011, the Liberal Democrats' culture spokesman, Don Foster, criticised the large number of BBC staff members who attended the eviction of Travellers and their supporters from the illegal section of the Dale Farm site. Foster stated that it was "ludicrous overstaffing and hardly [a] good way to get public sympathy for the 20 per cent budget cuts facing the BBC". The BBC responded that it had only 20 staff members on site.

=== Off-payroll tax arrangements ===
In October 2012, a Public Accounts Committee report found that the BBC had 25,000 "off payroll" contracts, 13,000 for people who were on air. The contracts enable people to make their own arrangements to pay tax and National Insurance, which could allow them to contribute less than employees on pay-as-you-earn tax. In response, the BBC said many of them were short-term contracts but that it was carrying out a detailed review of tax arrangements.

=== Funding ===
The fact that the BBC's domestic services are funded mainly by a television licence fee has been criticised by its competitors.

The rise of multichannel digital television led to criticism that the licence fee is unjustifiable on the basis that minority interest programmes can now be transmitted on specialist commercial subscription channels and that the licence fee was funding a number of digital-only channels, which many licence holders at the time could not watch (such as BBC Three and BBC Four).

== See also ==
- BBC controversies
- 2025 BBC editorial bias allegations
