= 2025 BBC editorial bias allegations =

2025 British media row

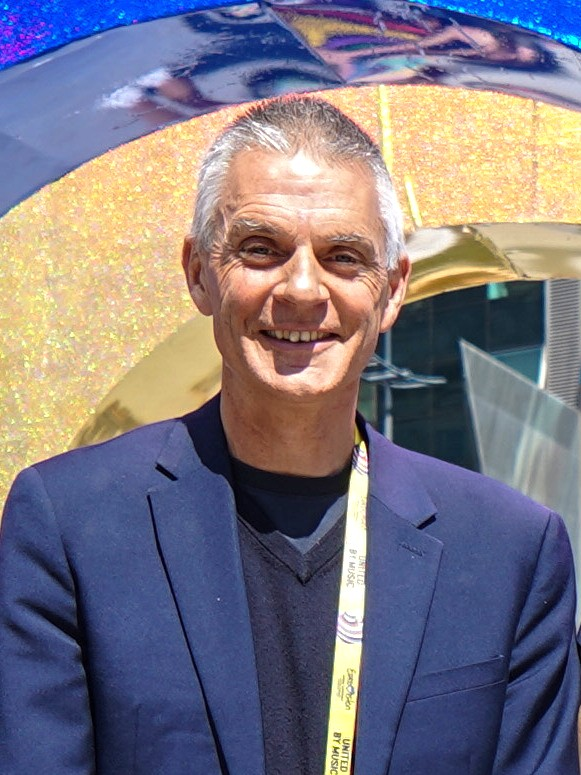
Director-General Tim Davie, who resigned

In November 2025, the BBC was accused of systemic editorial bias, following the leaking of an internal memo by Michael Prescott, a former adviser to the BBC's Editorial Standards Committee. The memo, in the form of a letter to BBC board members, was published in The Daily Telegraph. Prescott stated that the BBC's coverage of several issues reflected systemic bias. In particular he alleged that a 2024 episode of Panorama misled viewers in its depiction of a speech by U.S. President Donald Trump during the events of the January 6 United States Capitol attack. Systematic bias was also alleged in the reporting of the Gaza war and of transgender issues.

The publication of the memo led to the resignation of Director-General of the BBC Tim Davie and Head of News Deborah Turness. The Chair of the BBC, Samir Shah, later apologised for the Panorama incident but defended the BBC against wider claims of bias. US president Donald Trump threatened legal action.

The contents of the memo, along with the events leading to its leaking and wider reporting, led to criticism of the involvement of right-wing people within British politics and media. This included the reported influence of BBC board member Robbie Gibb and former Prime Minister Boris Johnson, who appointed him to the board, and their prior relationships with Prescott. Politicians including Liberal Democrat leader Ed Davey and Scotland's First Minister John Swinney called for Gibb's removal from the BBC board.

== Allegations ==
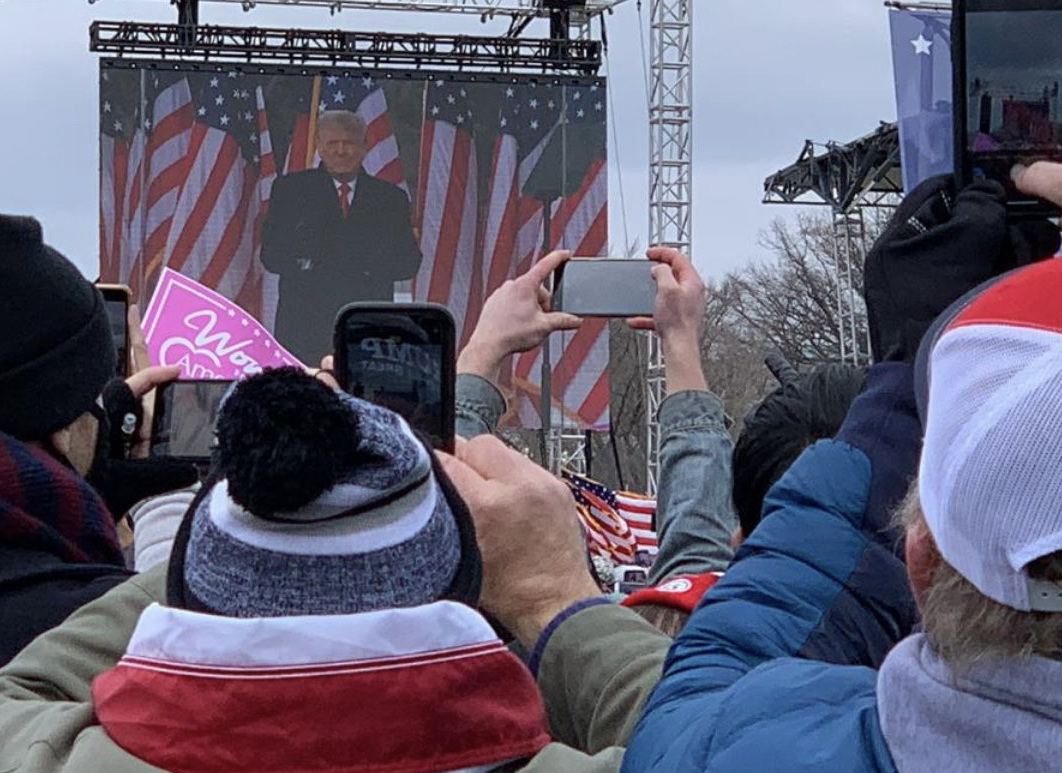
One allegation in the memo related to the juxtaposition of footage from Trump's speech on January 6, 2021, which was alleged to be misleading. The BBC subsequently apologised, labelling it an "error of judgement".

The controversy emerged when a memo written by Michael Prescott, a former adviser to the BBC's Editorial Standards Committee for three years, was leaked to The Daily Telegraph.

Prescott's memo was made available online by the UK Parliament Culture, Media and Sport Committee as part of BBC Chair Samir Shah's written response on 10 November 2025.

=== Trump speech edit by Panorama ===
The most prominent example reported was the editing in an episode of the BBC current affairs programme Panorama, broadcast in October 2024 one week before the 2024 U.S. presidential election, of President Donald Trump's speech during his 6 January 2021 address which was said to be misleading in making it appear that Trump encouraged the January 6 United States Capitol attack. A similar edit from a 2022 edition of Newsnight was also subsequently identified by The Daily Telegraph, during which Mick Mulvaney, being interviewed on air, commented on the footage being "spliced" from two separate parts of the speech.

=== Transgender issues ===
Prescott also expressed concerns regarding the BBC's coverage of transgender issues, stating that its reporting was effectively "censored" by LGBT specialist reporters who promoted a pro-trans agenda. It was claimed that the LGBTQ desk were actively "promoting the Stonewall view of the debate" and "decline[d] to cover any story raising difficult questions about the trans-debate." As a result, the report claimed, major news stories covered in the mainstream press were not reported on by the BBC, there was little or no coverage of the safety and quality of trans-care, detransitioner voices were not heard, and there was "a constant drip-feed of one-sided stories ... celebrating the trans experience without adequate balance or objectivity". He conveyed feeling "despair" at the lack of action from BBC management "when issues come to light".

=== Gaza war ===
The memo also contained criticism of how the BBC in various forms had covered the ongoing Gaza war. This included contributors, particularly on BBC Arabic, some of whom were reported to have made antisemitic comments on social media including calling for the killing of Jewish people. It alleged that BBC Arabic gave extensive coverage to stories that painted Israel as the aggressor while burying stories that contradicted that narrative. The letter also stated that the BBC programme Newsnight broadcast claims that thousands of babies were on the brink of starvation in Gaza that it already knew to be false. The Times reported that multiple BBC Arabic staff have been accused by the pro-Israel group CAMERA of making anti-Israel remarks on social media and breaching impartiality guidelines. The Daily Telegraph reported that BBC Arabic had to make more than 200 corrections following upheld complaints by CAMERA. CAMERA subsequently found that BBC headlines since the October 7 attacks were three times more likely to criticise Israel than Hamas. In December 2025, after complaints from CAMERA, the BBC acknowledged a 2021 BBC Arabic article on Hamas risked misleading readers by not clearly stating it was anti-Semitic and targets Jews, and amended it.

The memo also claimed that producers of four BBC programmes with historical content preferred non-expert academics who provided quotable sound bites on topics like racism and prejudice. This approach, according to Prescott, led to oversimplified and distorted narratives about British colonialism, slavery, and their lasting effects.

On 24 November 2025, Michael Prescott appeared before the Culture, Media and Sport Committee of the UK Parliament. He testified that at the time of his authoring the memo, he believed that problems of editorial bias at the BBC "were not being tackled properly" and "were getting worse".

== BBC response ==
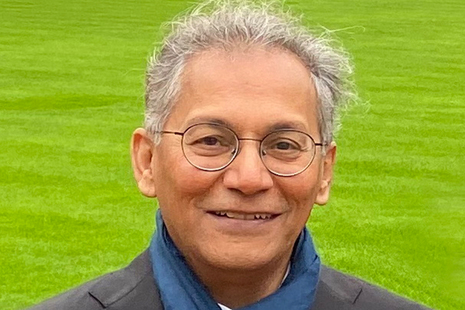
Chair of the BBC, Samir Shah

In response to the criticism, the BBC acknowledged the issues raised but defended its editorial decisions, insisting that corrections were made when errors were identified. The BBC's chairman, Samir Shah, and Director-General, Tim Davie, faced growing pressure as reporting of the accusations continued. On 9 November 2025, both Tim Davie and Deborah Turness resigned from their positions at the BBC.

The BBC stated that it would implement reforms to improve transparency and impartiality in its coverage, but the resignation of key executives did little to quell the criticism, with many commentators arguing that the BBC's systemic issues with bias went deeper than the departures of two senior staff.

On 10 November 2025, Samir Shah, the chair of the BBC publicly apologised for an "error of judgment" in the way the speech by president Donald Trump was edited. Shah however pushed back against the wider criticism of the memo, stating that Prescott's examples failed to present a "full picture of the discussions, decisions and actions that were taken" and that it was untrue for reporting to suggest that the BBC had attempted to bury concerns. Three days later the BBC issued an apology to Trump over the editing of his speech in Panorama and agreed the specific episode would not be re-broadcast, but rejected his demands for compensation.

Speaking to The Guardian, BBC reporter Deborah Cohen, whose work included covering gender dysphoria, rebuffed the memo's claims of internal censoring around trans issues. In contrast to the memo's claims, Cohen stated that pressure only came from outside the organisation, and that any apparent lapse in coverage was in line with editorial decisions across all output and not trans stories being subject to special treatment. During a November session of the Culture, Media and Sport Committee into the memo, the allegations of systemic bias were rebutted further by Caroline Daniel, who had also served as an external advisor on the standards committee alongside Prescott. Daniel's view was that the committee by its own existence demonstrated the BBC's commitment to impartiality, and that the memo merely reflected Prescott's personal views.

Following the resignations on 9 November 2025 of Tim Davie and Deborah Turness, Turness's Deputy and Global Director of BBC News, Jonathan Munro, was placed in charge of the BBC news division.

On 10 November, the BBC reported that it received a letter from Trump in which he threatened legal action over the edited version of his speech documented in a BBC documentary. On 13 November 2025, the BBC said it was looking into the allegations regarding the Trump video edit in the June 2022 Newsnight programme.

== $10 billion lawsuit ==
Trump v. British Broadcasting Corporation
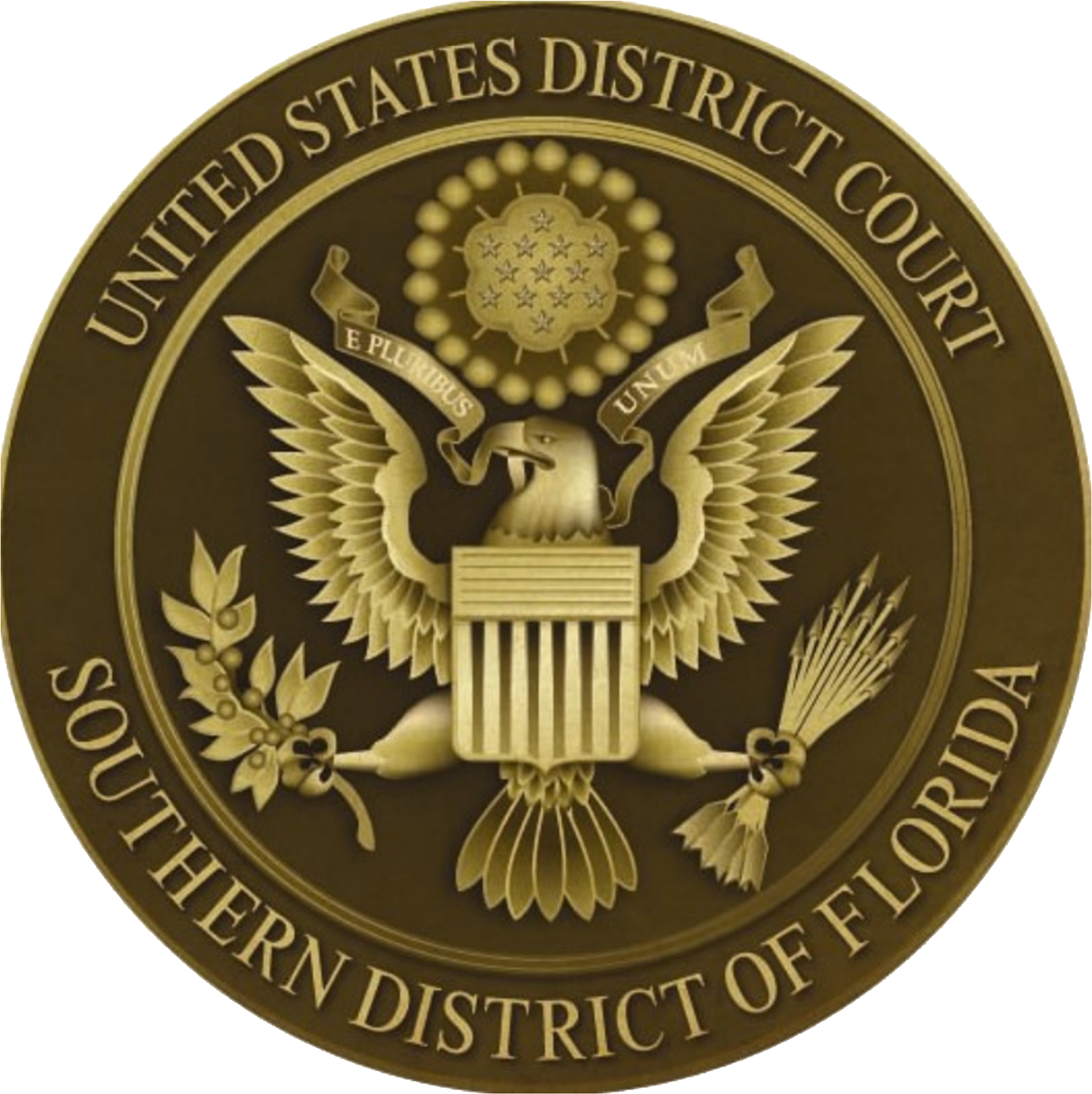
- Court: Southern District of Florida
- Started: December 15, 2025; 10 months ago
- Docket nos.: 1:25-cv-25894

Court membership
- Judge sitting: Roy Altman

Keywords
- Donald Trump's conflict with the news media

Trump filed a $10 billion lawsuit on 15 December 2025. The BBC, in its defence, said that there was no malice nor any legal basis for a defamation claim and that the programme had not been distributed in the US. On October 19, 2026, despite opposition from Trump's legal team, the BBC subpoenaed the testimony of former U.S. special counsel Jack Smith, who had been involved in the federal prosecution of Trump for election obstruction. The BBC argued that it would be unjust for Trump, as plaintiff, to stop the BBC from "obtaining the evidence it needs to robustly defend itself". The BBC credited Smith as perhaps the most "authoritative source" on the subject. U.S. Magistrate Judge Enjoliqué Lett said Trump would have to sit for a deposition by December 11.

== Other responses ==
Following the initial reporting, Caroline Dinenage MP, chair of the House of Commons' Culture, Media and Sport Committee, wrote to Samir Shah requesting details on how the BBC had addressed Prescott's concerns.

The response from the UK government and other political figures varied. The spokesperson for prime minister Keir Starmer stated that while mistakes had been made, the government still supported the BBC and that it must act to maintain public trust. Culture secretary Lisa Nandy also defended the BBC, suggesting that there was a "weaponisation" of criticism of the BBC which was "from all sides for its coverage of highly contentious and contested issues". Conservative leader of the opposition Kemi Badenoch stated that the BBC has contempt for those who call out its mistakes, while also saying the BBC is an "institution that we need to treasure in our country". Reform UK leader Nigel Farage said that the Panorama footage amounted to electoral interference and that the BBC had been "institutionally biased for decades". Former prime minister Boris Johnson, in an article for The Daily Telegraph, demanded an explanation from Tim Davie or his resignation.

Internationally, the White House condemned the BBC's actions, with Trump thanking The Daily Telegraph for exposing the alleged bias. Trump's administration also called for an independent inquiry into the BBC's operations.

=== Alleged roles of Robbie Gibb and Boris Johnson ===
Sources within the BBC told The Guardian that the board member who "led the charge" over the criticism in Prescott's memo was Robbie Gibb, Theresa May's former communications chief, and spoke of a political "coup". Gibb, who was appointed to the BBC board by Boris Johnson and confirmed by Rishi Sunak, had previously worked for the BBC as the editor of shows including Daily Politics and This Week, and helped to found the right-wing channel GB News. He also led a consortium that bought The Jewish Chronicle on behalf of a backer whose identity has never been revealed; the purchase was followed by a pronounced shift of the Chronicle to the right and a journalistic scandal involving fabricated stories.

It was also reported that Michael Prescott, the memo's author, and Robbie Gibb were friends, and that Prescott had previously been involved in efforts by then Prime Minister Boris Johnson to install a preferred candidate (former Daily Mail editor Paul Dacre) as head of Ofcom. According to The Guardian, it was alleged that the leaking itself was part of a coordinated effort to undermine the organisation, which Boris Johnson denied as "complete and utter bollocks". While Prescott himself would later corroborate his friendship with Gibb, and the latter's role in his appointment during questions from the Culture, Media and Sport Committee, he distanced himself from the idea it impacted his claims. Gibb himself would also strongly deny the suggestions of a coup, describing himself as "hugely impartial". Separately BBC Chair Samir Shah also suggested the idea of a coup as "fanciful".

Following the reporting of allegations regarding Gibb's role in the affair, some BBC staff and politicians called for his removal from the BBC board, including Liberal Democrat leader Ed Davey and the First Minister of Scotland and leader of the Scottish National Party, John Swinney.

== See also ==
- Criticism of the BBC
- Balen Report
- BBC controversies
