= Graham Usher (journalist) =

British journalist (1958–2013) devoted especially to Gaza

- Born: 12 December 1958; Debden, Essex, England
- Died: 8 August 2013 (aged 54); New York City, U.S.
- Occupation: Journalist
- Years active: 1990–2013
- Known for: Reporting on Palestine during the Oslo peace process and Second Intifada
- Notable work: Palestine in Crisis (1995), Dispatches from Palestine (1999)
- Spouse: Barbara Plett (m. 2003)

Graham Robin Usher (12 December 1958 – 8 August 2013) was a British journalist who became the first Palestine correspondent of The Economist. He won particular praise for his reporting on the Israel-Palestine conflict during the Oslo process and Second Intifada. The Palestinian intellectual Edward Said wrote in 1996 that Usher did "the best foreign on-the-spot reporting from Palestine".

== Early life and education ==
Usher was born on the Debden Estate, a large council estate in Essex, just outside London, the second son of Mary Usher and John Usher, a printer and trade union activist. John Usher died in 1970, the year Graham turned thirteen.

Usher dropped out of secondary school, but later attended art college, then completed an English and Philosophy degree at Sussex University. In the 1980s, he taught at Newham Community College and other further education institutions in East London, during which time he was active in East London's revolutionary left milieu. He participated in anti-fascist activities, supported the 1984 miners' strike, and wrote critically on the employment training schemes initiated by Margaret Thatcher's government for the journal Race & Class.

Usher was to derive from his working-class upbringing, and the radical milieu in which he spent his twenties, a political framework that both shaped his motivations as a journalist, and informed his analysis of the events on which he reported.

== Move to Palestine and career in journalism ==
Shortly afterward, Usher moved to Gaza to teach English with the British Council, and decided to become a journalist shortly after the Oslo accords were signed. He began to write for Middle East International, then Middle East Report, and shortly afterward for The Economist, which had never had a dedicated Palestine correspondent before. He also wrote for Al-Ahram Weekly.

Usher lived in Gaza for a few years, then the only Western correspondent to do so, but by 1996 he had moved to Jerusalem. There, he lived five minutes' walk from the offices of the Institute of Jerusalem Studies (later the institute for Palestine Studies) in Sheikh Jarrah.

He wrote two books, Palestine in Crisis (1995) and Dispatches from Palestine (1999), both of which were published by Pluto Press. In a review of the former, Joel Beinin wrote that Usher was "one of the most knowledgeable journalists writing in English about the West Bank and Gaza Strip."

He took a particular interest in the careers of Marwan Barghouti, Sheikh Ahmed Yassin and Aryeh Deri, whom he took to represent the emergence of a new generation of populist political leaders in Palestine and Israel. He viewed Mohammed Dahlan and Jibril Rajoub as emblematic of the layer of Palestinian former revolutionaries who had begun to transform themselves into security chiefs, who policed Palestinians on behalf of Israel.

Graham Usher reports for Canada's Talk Nation Radio from Islamabad in September 2008
Usher reports on the Islamabad Marriott Hotel bombing, the kidnap of an Afghan diplomat, and other news.

In 2003 he married Barbara Plett, a Canadian BBC correspondent based in Jerusalem. Two years later the couple moved to Islamabad, Pakistan, where Plett had accepted a new posting. Usher wrote from there for the London Review of Books.

Graham Usher reports for Canada's Talk Nation Radio from Islamabad in December 2008
Usher discusses the tensions between Pakistan and India arising from the role of Lashkar-e-Taiba in the attacks in Mumbai the previous month. He also discusses the regional role of the United States.

In 2009 the couple moved again, this time to New York. Both reported on the United Nations; Plett for the BBC, and Usher for Al-Ahram Weekly.

Usher's dispatches for Al-Ahram Weekly included a November 2011 article in which he argued that India, Brazil and South Africa had failed to bring a fresh voice to the United Nations. They had advocated "human rights in theory while backing sovereignty in practice," he wrote.

== Death ==
Usher died on 8 August 2013 at his home in New York of Creutzfeldt-Jakob disease. The degenerative brain condition had caused him to successively lose the ability to write, to read, and ultimately to talk. He is buried at a cemetery in Manitoba, Canada, where Plett is from.

Following his death, the Economist wrote that Usher was "one of the finest correspondents to have covered one of the world’s most complex and enduring conflicts." He was described by The Nation as one of its best foreign correspondents of the preceding two decades.

== Books ==
- Usher, Graham (1995). Palestine in Crisis: The Struggle for Peace and Political Independence after Oslo. London: Pluto Press.
- Usher, Graham (1999). Dispatches from Palestine: The Rise and Fall of the Oslo Peace Process. London: Pluto Press.
- Tordai, J.C. and Usher, Graham (2001). A People Called Palestine Stockport: Dewi Lewis Publishing
- Usher, Graham (2006) Introduction in Dolphin, Ray (2006). The West Bank Wall: Unmaking Palestine London: Pluto Press, pp1-32.
