= Michael Prescott (journalist) =

British journalist

- Education: St Catherine's College, Oxford
- Occupations: Communications professional; journalist; corporate advisor
- Writing career
- Period: 1980s–present
- Subjects: UK Politics; corporate Strategy; editorial Standards

Michael Prescott is a British communications and corporate affairs professional and former journalist. He spent more than a decade at The Sunday Times, where he served as chief political correspondent and later political editor, before moving into public relations and senior corporate roles, including corporate affairs director at BT Group. Prescott is Managing Director of Hanover Communications and a member of the UK government's Advisory Committee on Business Appointments.

He came to wider public attention in 2025 after a leaked memo raised concerns about editorial standards at the BBC, where he had served as an independent adviser to the Editorial Guidelines and Standards Board.
