= BBC Charter =

Royal charter of the British Broadcasting Corporation

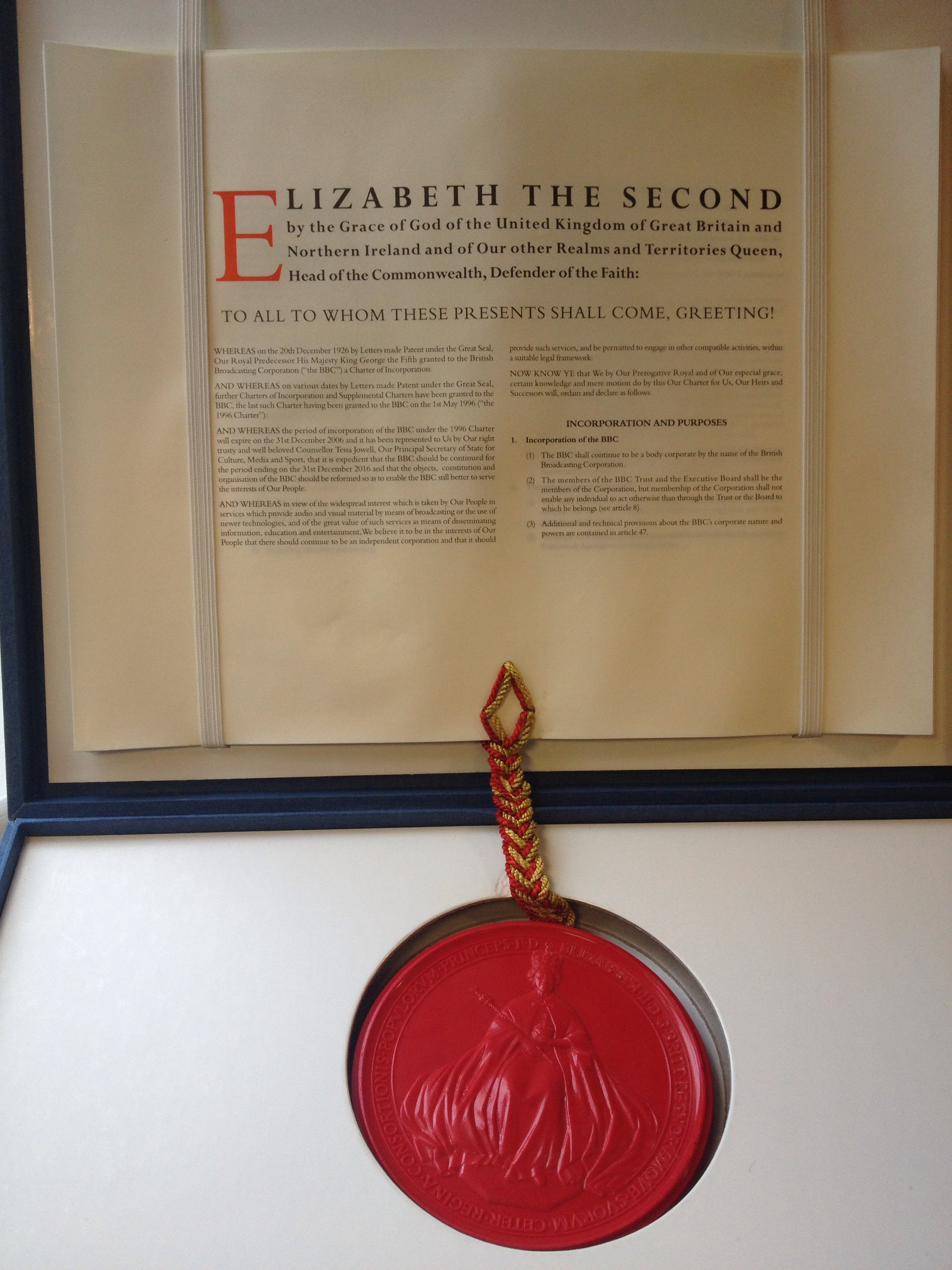
The ninth BBC Royal Charter, held at the BBC Written Archives Centre

The Royal Charter for the continuance (Note: The initial charter of 1927 read: Royal Charter for the incorporation of the British Broadcasting Corporation.) of the British Broadcasting Corporation, more commonly known as the BBC Charter, is a royal charter setting out the arrangements for the governance of the British Broadcasting Corporation. It, and an accompanying agreement recognise its editorial independence and set out its public obligations.

The initial BBC Charter established the BBC on 1 January 1927 as a replacement for the British Broadcasting Company, which had provided the broadcasting service until that point. As the royal charter created an entirely new body, separate arrangements were made to transfer the assets of the British Broadcasting Company to the new British Broadcasting Corporation via the Postmaster General. It was felt that establishing a body under a royal charter to replace the private company would allow the creation of a body that acted "as a trustee for the national interest" and would "endow the [BBC] with a prestige and influence which will be of special value to it."

Upon the expiry of the first charter, it was renewed with a replacement charter – a process that has continued ever since. It, and each subsequent royal charter, was initially for a period for ten years, except for the charter from 1947 to 1952, which ran for five years, and the charter from 2006 to 2017, which ran for eleven years. However, several charters were extended in duration, including 1947 (six months), 1952 (two years), and 1964 (two extensions totalling five years).

The most recent charter, the tenth, took effect on 1 January 2017 and will run until 31 December 2027.

== History ==
AND WHEREAS it has been made to appear to Us that more than two million persons in our Kingdom of Great Britain and Northern Ireland have applied for and taken out Licences to instal and work apparatus for wireless telegraphy for the purpose of receiving Broadcast programmes[.]

— George V, Royal Charter for 1927

The 1927 charter incorporated the BBC as independent of the Government similar to institutions like the Bank of England. With a royal charter—not as a governmental department, and therefore independent of it. It established the Board of Governors of the BBC and the Postmaster General was set to supervise and give licence to the broadcaster. The charter did not spell out 'independence' as such, yet.

In 1937, after having been made to appear that 7.5 million persons now used wireless telegraphy, the charter was renewed, and had the Postmaster General continue giving licence to the BBC.

After several subsequent charters, the 1981 charter moved the responsibilities of licensing the BBC to an unspecified Secretary of State. The 1997 charter specified the Secretary of State for Trade and Industry.

The BBC shall be independent in all matters concerning the content of its output, the times and manner in which this is supplied, and in the management of its affairs.

— Elizabeth II, Royal Charter for 2007

Though it is held that the BBC had throughout the history of broadcasting held a large degree of independence than other West European broadcasters earlier, comparing the different charters, that editorial independence had developed as part of the 'object' and 'governance' of the corporation and thus largely in implication. The 2007 charter was the first to spell it out in a manner separate.

The 2007 charter transformed the Board of Governors into the BBC Trust.

== Works cited ==
- Goodwin, Peter (2005). "Low Conspiracy? – Government interference in the BBC1". Westminster Papers in Communication and Culture. 2 (1): 96–118. doi:10.16997/wpcc.10. ISSN 1744-6708.
