= Barbara Plett Usher =

Canadian-born BBC television journalist (born 1967)

- Born: Barbara Plett; 1967 (age 58–59); Manitoba, Canada
- Education: Bachelor of Journalism at Carleton University
- Occupations: Journalist, News Editor, Presenter
- Employer: BBC
- Spouse: Graham Usher (m. 2003; died 2013)

Barbara Plett Usher (born 1967) is a Canadian-born UK journalist with experience in the Middle East and the UN. She has worked for the BBC in Jerusalem, Islamabad and the United Nations.

Between 2021 and 2024 she was the BBC's State Department correspondent, based in Washington, D.C., USA. Since 2024 she has been the BBC's Africa Editor, based in Nairobi, Kenya.

== Early life and education ==
Plett Usher was born in Manitoba, Canada, in 1967.

She graduated from Carleton University in Ottawa, Ontario, Canada, in 1991 with a bachelor's degree in journalism.

== Career ==
She joined the BBC as a freelancer from Cairo in 1995 and became its Middle East correspondent by 2000.

She then went on to cover the death of the Syrian President Hafez al-Assad in 2000 and to do much reporting under siege in Ramallah in 2002. Her career took her to Iraq in 2003.

Plett Usher worked as BBC correspondent in Jerusalem before being transferred to Islamabad in 2009. She was the BBC's United Nations correspondent since at least 2012.

During the BBC programme From Our Own Correspondent broadcast on 30 September 2004, Plett Usher said she cried when she saw Palestinian leader Yasser Arafat being taken to hospital during his terminal illness. This led to suggestions that the BBC was biased. After many complaints from viewers the BBC Governors' Programme Complaints Committee ruled that Plett Usher had breached editorial guidelines on due impartiality and the BBC's director of News, Helen Boaden, apologised for an editorial misjudgment.

Since 2024 she has been the BBC's Africa Editor, based in Nairobi, Kenya.

== Personal life ==
In 2003 Plett married Graham Usher, the Palestine correspondent of The Economist magazine. The couple moved to Pakistan in 2005, and to New York in 2009. Graham Usher died on 8 August 2013, at age 54, of Creutzfeldt–Jakob disease.

== See also ==
- Media coverage of the Arab–Israeli conflict
- Criticism of the BBC
