= Product displacement =

Removal of references to brands in creative works

Product displacement is the removing of trademarked products from primarily visual media in order to avoid the payment of licensing fees, if the trademark owner objects, or if the broadcaster would prefer not to publicise a product for free, if the owners have not paid for it to be included in a programme.

Product displacement can also refer to brands/companies deliberately modifying their name or logo in an attempt to make people see the logo and realize that the logo/name is not correct. This extra thinking time forces people to register the real brand. This method can be more effective than product placement.

== Method ==
Product displacement is usually achieved via digital pixelation, though prior to the widespread availability of computer post-production, stagehands would cover up brands on bottles, etc., using tape, or by using fake labels. This was called "greeking" and the term is now used for the digital process as well.

== Types ==
There are two types of product displacements within the industry, which are identified as fictionalized and unbranded product displacements.

=== Fictionalized product displacement ===
Fictionalized product displacement is often used by directors or production staff to use a completely fictional brand and/or product which closely resembles and mimics a non-fictional product or brand. This is often done so the viewers can make close correlation with an already existing non-fictional brand that they may use on a daily basis without having to create another fictional dimension for a separate product altogether. Some of the most popular TV series over the past decade have used this technique to allow their viewers to make that clear distinction, especially shows such as Scrubs, where the protagonists are often seen mingling at a coffee shop known as "Coffee Bucks" which closely resembles the logo, colour and theme of a Starbucks. Similarly other TV shows such as My Name Is Earl also used similar technique with the fictional candy bar by the name of TitTat Candy, which closely resembles the Kit Kat chocolate bar, offered by The Hershey Company.

=== Unbranded product displacement ===
Unbranded product displacement is used when a marketer makes a known effort to hide or pixelate the logo of non-fictional company or product within a specific advertisement, TV show, or movie. Within unbranded product displacement there are two different ways that can be used to hide or pixelate a non-fictional product or brand. Either through "digital alternation" where the brand is pixelated, erased, and or hidden digitally, or through physical removal of a brand, such as removing the logo of a car from its front grill.

== Other notable examples ==
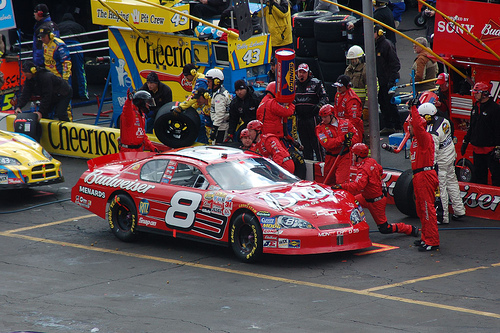
Dale Earnhardt Jr.'s #8 Chevrolet Monte Carlo appeared in Pixar animated film Cars with all beer advertising removed.

A TV or film studio does not need permission from a company to display or mention its products or service in media form. Warner Bros. Television's The Big Bang Theory used The Cheesecake Factory as a setting without any formal arrangement with the chain.

According to Danny Boyle, director of the Oscar-winning 2008 film Slumdog Millionaire, the producers had to resort to "product displacement" when companies such as Mercedes refused to allow their products to be used in non-flattering settings, in this case, a slum. This forced the filmmakers to digitally remove logos in post-production, costing "tens of thousands of pounds".

The practice of product displacement is also frequently seen on reality television, which do not have clearance to display the logos or products of non-sponsor companies. This accounts for the frequent appearance of pixel mosaics and blurring of logo T-shirts, soda cans or bottles, and other instances on shows such as America's Next Top Model, Survivor, Dr. Phil and The Real World.

The 2011 film Dark Horse was denied permission to film inside a Toys "R" Us, so director Todd Solondz fogged out the logo.

The 1978 film Grease was originally shot with several scenes containing Coca-Cola–branded paraphernalia. Producer Allan Carr had signed a product placement deal with Coke's rival, Pepsi; after filming had wrapped, producer Allan Carr ordered director Randal Kleiser to remove the Coke trademarks. Coca-Cola later sponsored the 2016 TV remake.

== See also ==
- Product placement
