= Peter Goodwin =

British academic

Peter Goodwin is a British academic who is a Principal Research Fellow of the Communication and Media Research Institute (CAMRI) at the University of Westminster.

== Work ==
Goodwin has worked at the University of Westminster since 1994. He has been Head of the Department of Journalism and mass Communication (2004–8) and Director of Research for the School of Media, Arts and Design (2008–15) Since 2015 he has been A Principal Research Fellow in CAMRI.

His areas of expertise are political economy of the media; media policy; media and politics; the television industry; and the social and economic impact of new media technologies. He is cited by Brunel University in London, describing himself as "an international expert in digital media policy and economics".

== Publications ==
- Goodwin, Peter (4 May 2018). "Where's the Working Class?". tripleC: Communication, Capitalism & Critique. Open Access Journal for a Global Sustainable Information Society. 16 (2): 535–545. doi:10.31269/triplec.v16i2.1005. ISSN 1726-670X.
- Goodwin, Peter (22 April 2018). Lowe, Gregory Ferrell; Bulck, Hilde Van den; Donders, Karen (eds.). "An Impossible Challenge for Public Service Media? The Intellectual Context of the Networked Society". Public Service Media in the Networked Society. Göteborg: Nordicom: 29–41. ISBN 978-91-87957-73-4.
- Goodwin, Peter (1 September 1998). Television Under the Tories: Broadcasting Policy 1979 - 1997. British Film Institute. ISBN 978-0851706146.
- Goodwin, Peter (2017) [2005]. "Low Conspiracy? – Government interference in the BBC1". Westminster Papers in Communication and Culture. 2 (1): 96–118. doi:10.16997/wpcc.10. ISSN 1744-6708.
- Goodwin, P. (1999). The television policies of the UK administrations of Margaret Thatcher and John Major 1979-1997 (doctoral thesis). University of Westminster. doi:10.34737/945y0.
- Goodwin, Peter (1995). "British media policy takes to the superhighway". Media, Culture & Society. 17 (4): 677–689. doi:10.1177/016344395017004009. ISSN 0163-4437.
