= Balen Report =

Report on BBC coverage of the Israeli–Palestinian conflict

The Balen Report is a 20,000-word document written by the senior broadcast journalist Malcolm Balen in 2004 after examining hundreds of hours of the BBC's coverage of the Israeli–Palestinian conflict. The report was commissioned by former BBC Director of News, Richard Sambrook, following persistent complaints from the public and the Israeli government of allegations of anti-Israel bias. As of April 2026, it has still not been released.

== Freedom of Information court case ==
A number of people requested copies of the report under the Freedom of Information Act 2000. The BBC rejected these requests on the grounds that the report fell under a derogation in the FOI Act: "Information held by the BBC is subject to the Freedom of Information Act only if it is 'held for purposes other than those of journalism, art or literature'." The BBC contended that as an internal report aimed at checking its own standards of journalism, the report was held for purposes of journalism. The BBC's position was challenged by Jewish activist and consultant commercial solicitor at London firm Forsters, Steven Sugar, who appealed initially to the Information Commissioner (who ruled in favour of the BBC) and then to the Information Tribunal (who ruled that the report was not held for purposes of journalism).

In 2007 the BBC appealed against the decision of the Information Tribunal to the High Court on two grounds: that the Information Tribunal did not have jurisdiction to hear an appeal from the Information Commissioner in this case and that, even if it did, its decision was flawed as a matter of law. The High Court decided that the Tribunal did lack jurisdiction and rejected Mr Sugar's challenge to the Commissioner's decision. The High Court did not consider the BBC's second ground of appeal. Mr Sugar's appeal to the Court of Appeal against the High Court's decision on the jurisdiction question was dismissed but his subsequent appeal to the House of Lords (then the highest court in the UK) was allowed by 3 votes to 2 on 11 February 2009. Thus the Tribunal's decision in Mr Sugar's favour was reinstated. The BBC retained its second ground of appeal and the case returned to the High Court on 2 October 2009, when Mr Justice Irwin ruled in the BBC's favour. His decision was that the information requested was held 'significantly' for the purposes of journalism and therefore was exempt under the Freedom of Information Act. On 23 June 2010, at the Court of Appeal the Master of the Rolls, Lord Neuberger, Lord Justice Moses and Lord Justice Munby upheld that decision and rejected Mr Sugar's appeal.

After Mr Sugar's death in January that year, an appeal by his widow, Fiona Paveley, was heard on 23 November 2011 at the Supreme Court of the United Kingdom, which had assumed the judicial functions of the House of Lords in 2009. On 15 February 2012 the Supreme Court unanimously dismissed the appeal. All but one judge dismissed it on the basis that, even if information is held only partly for the purposes of journalism, art or literature, as it was in this case, it is outside the scope of FOIA. Lord Wilson would have dismissed it on the basis that, if information is held predominantly for the purposes of journalism, art or literature, it is outside the scope of the Freedom of Information Act and that the Balen Report was held predominantly for those purposes.

In May 2021, after the BBC published the Dyson inquiry, Lord Hayward and Baroness Barran of the House of Lords called on the BBC to release the Balen Report.

=== Alleged legal costs ===
In August 2012, the politics website The Commentator reported a Freedom of Information request they had made which indicated that the BBC had spent £330,000 in legal costs. This figure does not include BBC in-house legal staff time or Value Added Tax.

The BBC's press release following the High Court judgment included the following statement:

"The BBC's action in this case had nothing to do with the fact that the Balen report was about the Middle East – the same approach would have been taken whatever area of news output was covered."

The claimant, Mr Sugar, was reported after his earlier success in the House of Lords in BBC v Sugar as saying:

"It is sad that the BBC felt it necessary to spend hundreds of thousands of pounds of public money fighting for three years to try to load the system against those requesting information from it. I am very pleased that the House of Lords has ruled that such obvious unfairness is not the result of the Act."

However, the High Court then ruled that the BBC was not required to disclose the Balen Report, and in spite of appeals by Mr Sugar and, after his death, by his wife, both the Court of Appeal and the Supreme Court agreed with that ruling, thus clarifying the law applying to any similar reports in the future.

== See also ==
- Media coverage of the Israeli–Palestinian conflict
