= The Hits =

2002–2008 British television channel

- Logo used from 2005 to 2008

Ownership
- Owner: Box Television (Bauer Group/Channel Four Television Corporation)
- Sister channels: The Box; Kerrang!; Kiss; Magic; Q TV; Smash Hits

History
- Launched: 30 October 2002
- Closed: 15 August 2008
- Replaced by: 4Music (first version)

The Hits was a music video channel broadcast in the United Kingdom and Ireland, owned by Box Television. On 15 August 2008 it was rebranded as 4Music.

== Overview and availability ==
The channel showcased a range of pop centred on chart hits and current favourites. Originally, the vast majority of music videos were selected by viewers by means of calling a premium-rate telephone number, however the policy was abandoned with the channel playing an automated selection of videos and countdown shows presented by celebrities and singers past and present. Programming was often themed to coincide with events such as St. Patrick's Day and Christmas.

The channel was available free-to-air on the British digital terrestrial television service Freeview on channel 18. It was also available on Sky Digital, encrypted as a part of Sky's Music Pack. The Hits was also available on Virgin Media and was included in the basic package. It was also able to be seen through the British Forces Broadcasting Service.

== Programmes on The Hits ==
87-07 was a series of programmes where a song was played from each of the years from 1987 to 2007. There was a later version called 88-08 which went from 1988 to 2008. There were different collections of songs depending on different things that the songs had in common, an example of 87-07 is Cheesy Pop 87-07 which includes the songs "Never Gonna Give You Up" by Rick Astley, "Saturday Night" by Whigfield and "C'est la Vie" by B*Witched which are all commonly regarded as "cheesy pop songs".

Another type of programme on The Hits was where one hundred songs are played, usually counting down to a song that was featured as "number one". This varies from 100 Forgotten Gems of the Nineties to The Nation's Favourite Love Songs. Similarly formatted programmes with fifty or twenty songs were also broadcast.

The Hits Chart was played at around 12.15 and 17:15 Monday-Friday. The Hits Chart was simply a countdown of the biggest songs of the day.

The Hits had a programme called Every Number One of the Nineties which, as the title suggests, played every number one of the nineties back to back. It was played over a bank holiday weekend in two parts, the first part on the Sunday and the second part on the Monday. Every Number One of the Nineties was later played on 4Music in small segments. A similar programme was Every Number One of the Twenty-first Century.

Early in the morning, there was a programme called "Signed by The Hits". This programme's duration was usually 30 minutes. The programme involved a sign language interpreter signing to the songs on screen to help deaf people understand the music. Due to persistent criticism, the show was removed.

== Replacement with 4Music ==
On 20 February 2008, it was announced that The Hits would change its name to 4Music later in the year, and a trial period broadcast on Sundays under the 4Music banner was broadcast on Sunday evenings during the spring. In June 2008 it was further announced that this replacement was to take place during the V Festival weekend on 15 August. The replaced station shows predominantly music videos, alongside live performances and Channel 4 programming like Star Stories and The Sunday Night Project, in addition to documentaries about artists.

In the weeks before the launch, 4Music aired teaser trailers for the channel as part of its extensive promotion of the rebrand and as part of the promotion one of the three stages for T4 On The Beach was named the 4Music stage.

The Hits stopped broadcasting music videos on Friday 15 August 2008 at 06:00. The last video played on The Hits was "Thank You for the Music" by ABBA, before heading in to a promo for 4Music, which would be launched from 19:00.

== Ofcom controversy ==
In November 2007, Ofcom found The Hits had breached its broadcast licence for failing to retain copies of its programming. Two viewers had complained questioning the authenticity of some of the winning entries on text-in quiz programme Win Win TV, broadcast overnight on 26 June.

The broadcaster was unable to provide Ofcom with a review copy of the programme in question because of "problems with its logging system". Condition 11 of a Television Licensable Content Service licence requires the broadcaster to keep recordings of all output for 60 days after transmission, providing Ofcom with any material on request.

"Failure to supply these recordings is a serious and significant breach of the broadcaster’s licence. This will be held on record," the regulator noted.

== The Hits Radio ==
In 2003, companion radio station The Hits Radio was launched. It ceased broadcasting on 4 June 2018.
