= Box Upfront =

British free-to-air television channel

- Logo used from 2016 to 2020
- Country: United Kingdom

Ownership
- Owner: The Box Plus Network (Channel Four Television Corporation)
- Sister channels: 4Music; The Box; Box Hits; Kerrang!; Kiss; Magic

History
- Launched: 3 July 2012 (12 years, 44 days)
- Replaced: Q
- Closed: 9 January 2020
- Former names: Heat (2012–2016)

Heat logo (2012-2015)

Box Upfront was a British music video television channel owned by The Box Plus Network. It launched on 3 July 2012 as Heat and was originally based on the magazine of the same name. The channel replaced Q.

The channel featured daily celebrity gossip show Heat's Huge News, as well as a 60-minute programme rounding up weeks stories, titled Heat's Huge Week of News, which was produced by ITN. In addition, ITN Productions co-produced celebrity documentary series Real Stories with Box Television. Heat also featured The Heat-Ometer, its pick of the 20 biggest music videos narrated by Heat editor, Lucie Cave.

Box Upfront broadcast current and future mainstream pop music videos 24/7.

On 2 April 2013, all Box Television channels went free-to-air on satellite, apart from 4Music which went free-to-view. As a result, the channels were removed from the Sky EPG in Ireland. However, Heat launched on Freesat on 29 April 2013, alongside Magic, following the addition of four other Box Television channels on 15 April.

On 25 May 2016, the channel was rebranded as Box Upfront. On 1 November 2019, the channel temporarily rebranded as a Christmas music channel called BoXmas, a role also occupied by sister channel Magic (albeit not temporarily rebranded). As the impending shutdown was announced during the rebrand, the channel kept the BoXmas branding, but shifted to a playlist similar to Box Hits on 26 December. Box Upfront ceased to broadcast on 9 January 2020, signing off with a block of departure-themed songs; "Goodbyes" by Post Malone featuring Young Thug, "Bye Bye Bye" by NSYNC, and "Goodbye" by Spice Girls were the last videos played before it ended operations. The channel space then transitioned to a slide stating that BoXmas was "taking a break" and would be back for the next holiday season (though obviously on a different channel), and redirecting viewers to its sister channels. In October 2020, The Box temporarily rebranded as BoXmas, thus making that channel the new home of BoXmas.

== See also ==
- Heat (magazine)
- Heat Radio
