= Q TV =

Q
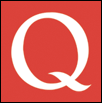

Ownership
- Owner: Box Television (Bauer Group/Channel Four Television Corporation)
- Sister channels: 4Music; The Box; Kerrang!; Kiss; Magic; Smash Hits

History
- Launched: 2 October 2000
- Closed: 3 July 2012 (11 years, 275 days)
- Replaced by: Heat

Q was a UK music channel based on Q Magazine, launched on 2 October 2000. It was operated by Box Television, and specialised in indie, rock and alternative.

It was available in the UK on Sky channel 364 and Virgin Media channel 338. In Ireland, it was available on UPC Ireland channel 714 and in Iceland on Síminn. It is also available in South Africa on TopTV channel 503.

Also known by its slogan Q The Music (cue the music), the channel played a wide variety of music, predominantly bands like Snow Patrol, Coldplay, and Stereophonics.

== History ==
Q was launched on 2 October 2000. Its launch promos starred then-up-and-coming actor Martin Freeman. Like other EMAP channels, Q was originally a jukebox channel, where viewers selected music videos using premium rate phone lines; however this element was dropped in 2004.

On 3 July 2012, Q closed and was replaced with Heat, a celebrity news and music TV channel.

== FHM TV ==
For a few years, much of the prime time output of the channel was instead given over to FHM TV, broadcasting between 4pm and 6am based on another magazine (also by EMAP), which specialised mainly on females in music videos. However in October 2007, the FHM TV block on Q was dropped and Q regained its full hours.
