= Hit40UK =

UK radio programme (2003–2009)

- Genre: Chart
- Running time: Sundays 4:00pm – 7:00pm
- Country of origin: United Kingdom
- Language: English
- Home station: 95.8 Capital FM
- TV adaptations: 4Music, The Box and Smash Hits
- Starring: Dr. Fox (2003–2004); Katy Hill (2004–2005); Stephanie Hirst (2004–2006); Lucio Buffone (2006–2009); Natalie Brown (2003–2009); Rich Clarke (2009)
- Created by: Global Radio
- Original release: 5 January 2003 – 7 June 2009

Hit40UK was a networked Top 40 chart show broadcasting on around 130 UK commercial radio stations every Sunday from 4pm to 7pm. It was also a TV programme shown on 4Music. The radio version was produced in house by Global Radio (formerly GCap Media) and Somethin' Else.

The show was cancelled on 7 June 2009 and the last number 1 single was Boom Boom Pow by The Black Eyed Peas, played at 6:52pm. It was replaced by The Official Big Top 40. The chart continued to be compiled, and a TV version was shown on 4Music, The Box, and Smash Hits, which was renamed UKHot40.

== Format ==
The radio show counted down the top 40 songs in the chart. Unlike the official UK Singles Chart broadcast at the same time by BBC Radio 1, the Hit40UK chart included only the digital downloads and airplay in the UK, whereas the official chart includes physical and download sales with no radio airplay. The show always enjoyed higher audience figures than Radio 1's Official Chart Show since 1993, however, this was because Hit40UK was broadcast on 130 stations, whereas the Official Chart was (and is) only broadcast on BBC Radio 1, except for a brief period of 2006, when a weak commercial radio sector caused Hit40UK's share to fall below that of its rival.

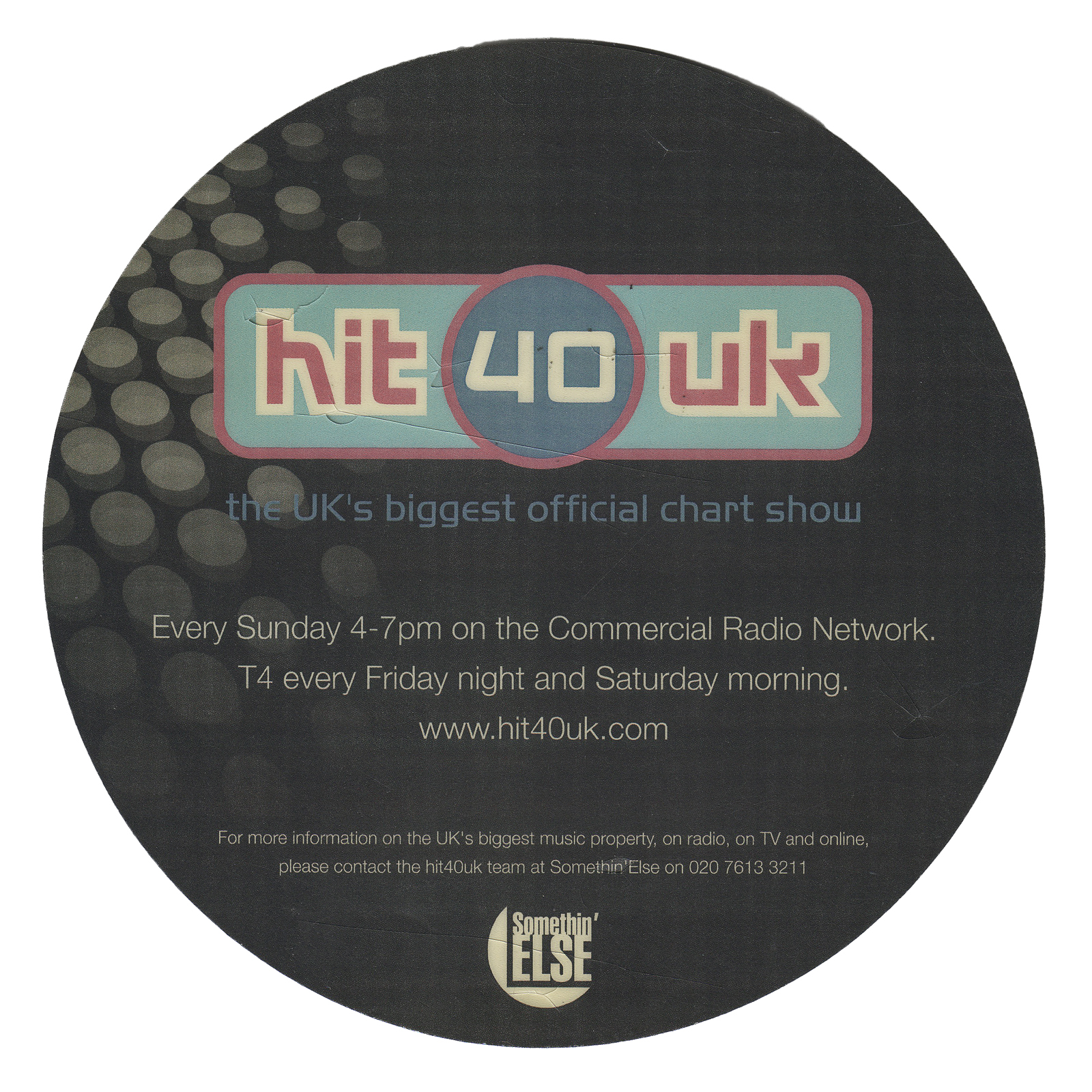
Promotional mousemat made for the 2003-2009 record sales chart radio show made by Global Radio & Somethin' Else.

== Chart history ==
=== Inception ===
Hit40UK descended from The Network Chart Show which began on 30 September 1984 and which was originally hosted by David Jensen and broadcast on competing commercial radio stations across the UK. The Network Chart Show aired on Sundays from 5-7pm, as competition to BBC Radio 1's own Top 40 chart show, The Official Chart. In October 1990, the show was extended to start at 4pm and the chart expanded from a Top 30 to a Top 40 countdown. The Network Chart Show had been compiled by MRIB until Pepsi took over sponsorship from Nescafé in August 1993. In 1995, it was called the Pepsi Network Chart Show, but in 1996 it was renamed the Pepsi Chart. Pepsi ended their sponsorship of the show on 29 December 2002, and the Hit40UK name was adopted on 5 January 2003, but Dr. Fox remained the host until 30 May 2004. On 6 June 2004 Stephanie Hirst and Katy Hill became co-hosts of Hit40UK, from 23 October 2005 Hirst hosted the show on her own.

=== Operation ===
In March 2006, Hit40UK began broadcasting worldwide on the U-Pop satellite channel. The international version of the show is hosted by Mark Daley. It can be heard on XM Satellite Radio across the US and around the planet on WorldSpace Satellite Radio.

Hirst who during the week hosted the Galaxy Breakfast show in Yorkshire and was enjoying considerable success doing so, had to stand down as presenter of Hit40UK due to objections from Galaxy's rival Yorkshire radio stations Viking FM, Radio Aire and Hallam FM who were due to start broadcasting the chart on 22 October 2006. They were unhappy that a Galaxy Yorkshire presenter would be heard on their station, since they could possibly lose a proportion their breakfast audience to Hirsty's weekday breakfast show.

On 12 October 2006, it was announced that the programme was to be relaunched on 22 October with a new presenter, 95.8 Capital FM's Lucio Buffone. A new logo was also introduced to replace their old look. Emap dropped their Smash-Hits! Chart to broadcast the relaunched version of the Hit40UK show across their Big City Network of stations. In the same week, a dance and urban chart, the Fresh 40, hosted by Dynamite MC, was introduced to commercial radio's dance and urban stations, such as those in the Galaxy Network and the Kiss Network.

On 19 April 2009, Lucio's contract with Hit40UK ended, therefore a new presenter, Rich Clarke, became the presenter of the network chart show the week after, 26 April 2009, introducing a new image to the chart. The top 40 format also changed in January 2009: instead of charting the most popular tunes from radio airplay, downloads and single sales, the chart consisted of downloads and airplay alone.

=== Cancellation ===
After a few months of the revamped show, Hit 40 UK ceased broadcasting and the last show was completed on 7 June 2009, resulting in a new chart show to be broadcast on 14 June 2009. Cover presenter, Matt Wilkinson, from Global Radio’s Heart Network presented the last Hit40UK show, although Rich Clarke presented a London-centric version on 95.8 Capital FM live from their Summertime Ball.

A similar chart, The Big Top 40 Show replaced Hit40UK, with presenters Rich Clarke and Kat Shoob launching the show on Sunday 14 June 2009. The new show was based on iTunes downloads, becoming the first real-time chart to be broadcast in the United Kingdom. It is now known as The Official Big Top 40 and is broadcast across Global's Capital and Heart stations.

== Sister chart shows ==
- Smash Hits Chart (TV Top 40) The Smash Hits Chart was produced by Emap & introduced by Mark Goodier from 2003 until April 2006, when Robin Banks took over. For most of its run, it counted down the week's top 40 singles, as voted for by viewers of TV channels The Box, The Hits and Smash Hits. Later in its run, it used the MRIB sales top 10 and a 50/50% airplay/sales scale in the 11-40 positions. It was broadcast across the Big City Network, Kiss Network, The Hits Radio and Smash Hits Radio, as well as a number of non-Emap stations. It ceased broadcasting in the Autumn of 2006, due to the launch of the revamped Hit40UK.
- The A List (Adult Contemporary) launched in February 2006 on stations including Heart, Real Radio and Century FM. At launch it was presented by Melanie Sykes and Nick Snaith. The show ended on Sunday 23 December 2007.
- Fresh 40 (Dance and Urban) started nearly a year later in March 2007. It was presented by Kiss 100's Dynamite MC, and was broadcast on the Kiss and Galaxy Networks, plus a few local stations.
- Galaxy 40 (Dance, Urban, Pop) launched in late 2008 across the Galaxy Network, but was cancelled in June 2009 due to the formation of The Big Top 40 Show, which broadcasts across 145 stations in the United Kingdom.
