= UKHot40 =

- Also known as: UKHotList; Hit40UK (until 2010)
- Genre: Chart show
- Presented by: Dave Wartnaby (2006-2013); Will Best (2013-)
- Country of origin: United Kingdom
- Original language: English

Production
- Running time: 3 hours (Top 40)
- Production company: The Box Plus Network

Original release
- Network: 4Music; The Box; Box Hits

Related
- Hit40UK (former radio show); UKHot40: Big Beats Chart

UKHotList, originally Hit40UK and UKHot40 was a televised Top 40/20 chart show produced by The Box Plus Network for 4Music, The Box and Box Hits.

The show was originally based on Hit40UK, a former radio chart show that aired from 2003 until 2009. Unlike the official UK Singles Chart broadcast by BBC Radio 1, the Hit40UK chart included only the digital downloads and airplay in the UK, whereas the Official Chart includes physical, audio streams and download sales with no radio airplay.

From 2015-2023, the show, then known as UKHotList, was complied by Spotify and counted down the most streamed tracks of the week on the platform. Plus there were other versions of the show such as UKHotList: Kiss Edition, a version of the show on Kiss TV, and UKHotList of (year), where the most streamed tracks of the year were counted.

== See also ==
- Hit40UK
