= Ledley and The Kings =

British pop band

Ledley and the Kings
- Genre: Pop
- Years active: 2015–present
- Members: Adam Manson, Adam Nathan, Benji Dymant, Darryl Taylor and David Marcus

Ledley and the Kings is a British pop band, who currently reside in London. The band is composed of Adam Manson, Adam Nathan, Benji Dymant, Darryl Taylor and David Marcus.

Their debut single "Hot Shot Tottenham 2015" peaked at number 29 in the Hot 40 UK Chart.

== Formation ==
In 2015, having been friends for many years, Manson, Nathan, Dymant, Taylor and Marcus decided to form the band. All fans of North London football team Tottenham Hotspur F.C, the group were inspired by the team's run to the Football League Cup final.

== Inspiration ==
The football club Tottenham Hotspur F.C is known for its musical heritage. Working alongside "Rockney" duo Chas & Dave, the club recorded four FA Cup final singles including "Glory Glory Tottenham Hotspur"/"Ossie's Dream" in 1981, "Tottenham Tottenham" in 1982 and "Hot Shot Tottenham!" in 1987.

Having grown up singing these anthems and after a long day in their local pub Ledley and the Kings decided to mark the club's achievement of reaching the cup final by creating their own version of the Chas & Dave classic "Hot Shot Tottenham!"

== Songwriting ==
Following conversations with Chas & Dave, Ledley and the Kings received permission to craft new lyrics. Knowing and appreciating fans love of the original, the band paid homage to particular lyrics but ensured the new version was sufficiently updated to include names and references to the current playing staff. The song would also retain its original name with the only addition specifying the year.

In an attempt to seamlessly resonate with the version from 1987, the band mixed the updated lyrics with the original backing track. Further strengthening their links to the original version, the band worked alongside Chas' son Nik Hodges who in 2011 played drums for the band alongside his father. He now manages the duo.

== Official release ==
"Hot Shot Tottenham 2015!" was released on 19 February 2015 and Tottenham Hotspur F.C announced that this would be the club's official Cup Final Song. This track was made available for purchase via the iTunes Store at a cost of £0.59. It was also made available on numerous streaming websites including Spotify The band confirmed that all the proceeds from the single would be donated to the Tottenham Tribute Trust, an organisation that reaches out to members of the Spurs family who are fighting hard times either financially, medically or both and is dedicated to making sure that no former Spurs player is forgotten.

== Chart success ==
Within days of release the song appeared in the Official iTunes chart, it peaked at number 25, whilst the single also reached number 1 in the Amazon Movers and Shakers Chart. "Hot Shot Tottenham 2015" reached number 29 in the UKHOT40 Chart.

The band were invited by Tottenham Hotspur to appear on the pitch at half-time during a Europa League game against Italian side ACF Fiorentina. The band were greeted by rapturous applause from the Tottenham faithful and were interviewed about their experience to date. This was followed by the world exclusive premiere of the official "Hot Shot Tottenham 2015" music video.

In the following days, the band continued to receive an overwhelming response to the song. They received tweets from several sporting legends including British and Irish Lions captain Sam Warburton as well as Tottenham heroes including Harry Kane, Ossie Ardiles and Ledley King.

Following this success, members of the band were also invited to appear on BBC, ITV, Sky Sports News and fans favourite TV programme Soccer AM.
