= Kerrang! TV =

British free-to-air television channel

Ownership
- Owner: Channel Four Television Corporation
- Sister channels: Channel 4; 4seven; E4; E4 Extra; Film4; More4; 4Music; The Box; Kiss; Magic

History
- Launched: 2 April 2001; 25 years ago
- Closed: 30 June 2024; 2 years ago

Kerrang! TV was a British music television channel owned by Channel Four Television Corporation. The network used the branding of the music magazine Kerrang! under a brand licensing agreement with Bauer Media Group. The channel primarily broadcast music videos without set scheduling to allow text requests for their playlists. The Head of Music between 2001-2018 was Mark Adams.

== Background ==
The first broadcast of Kerrang! TV had a countdown of voters' most-desired videos. The most popular choice and the first video shown on Kerrang! TV was Nirvana's "Smells Like Teen Spirit". Limp Bizkit's "Break Stuff" and Everlast's "Black Jesus" were also in the first three videos played. The last song ever played was Fall Out Boy's "Thnks Fr Th Mmrs".

Kerrang mainly aired nu metal, pop punk/skate punk and indie rock genre videos. Certain acts such as Tenacious D and Limp Bizkit got higher-than-average play rates, due to higher rates of text requests. Themed 30-minute segments often covered artists who were on the playlist, with large numbers of videos, most noticeably Green Day, Panic! at the Disco, Paramore and You Me at Six.

The station had an annual video countdown called the Rock 100, which covered the 100 most requested videos on the station (Rock or otherwise) in the previous year, and with links between blocks of tracks given by one of the featured bands. In 2005 Good Charlotte presented the Rock 100 from a strip club in Manchester. In 2009 Charlie Simpson made a voice-over for the show with clips from people's votes in the Download Festival.

== Availability ==
The channel was available on many platforms including Sky and Virgin Media. It was part of a network of channels owned by The Box Plus Network, which included 4Music, Box Hits, Kiss, The Box and Magic. On 2 April 2013, all Box Television channels went free-to-air on satellite, apart from 4Music which went free-to-view. As a result, the channels were removed from the Sky EPG in Ireland. However, Kerrang! TV launched on Freesat on 15 April 2013, alongside three other Box Television channels, but was removed on 24 March 2015. Kerrang! and its sister channels returned to Freesat on 8 December 2021 alongside Channel 4 HD.

From 27 September to 17 November 2021, Kerrang! instead simulcast The Box, due to cleanup and restoration from the fire suppression system activating during a false alarm situation at Red Bee Media's playout facility.

== Closure ==
On 29 January 2024, Channel 4 announced that Kerrang! TV and its sister channels would be closing as part of the future plans of the company leading up to 2030. In the press release, it is stated that Channel 4 are "Proposing to close small linear channels that no longer deliver revenues or public value at scale, including the Box channels in 2024 and others at the right time". At 23:59 on 30 June 2024, Kerrang! TV closed, with its final music video being "Thnks fr th Mmrs" by Fall Out Boy.
