= Magic (TV channel) =

British television channel

Ownership
- Owner: Channel Four Television Corporation Shaw Media
- Sister channels: Channel 4; 4seven; E4; E4 Extra; Film4; More4; 4Music; The Box; Kerrang!; Kiss

History
- Launched: 13 September 2001; 25 years ago
- Closed: 30 June 2024; 2 years ago

Magic was a British music television channel owned by Channel Four Television Corporation. The channel played mainly easy listening music videos and was based on the Magic radio station owned by Bauer Media Audio UK. Magic focused on music from the 1970s to the present day. During Christmas of each year, the channel only played Christmas music under their block called "Christmas is Magic".

Like other Box Television music television channels under Bauer's brand, Magic operated a jukebox service where viewers were able to request videos to be played via a premium-rate telephone number.

== History ==
The channel was a part of a network of channels owned by The Box Plus Network (formerly Box Television) which included 4Music, Kerrang! TV, Box Hits, The Box, and Kiss. In their last five years of operation, all these channels including Magic TV were in Channel 4's main business operations.

On 2 April 2013, all Box Television channels went free-to-air on satellite, apart from 4Music which went free-to-view. As a result, the channels were removed from the Sky EPG in Ireland. However, Magic was launched on Freesat on 29 April 2013, alongside Heat, following the addition of four other Box Television channels on 15 April. Magic TV and its sister channels returned to Freesat on 8 December 2021.

== Closure ==
On 29 January 2024, Channel 4 announced that Magic and its sister channels would be closing as part of the future plans of the company leading up to 2030.

In the press release, it is stated that Channel 4 are "Proposing to close small linear channels that no longer deliver revenues or public value at scale, including the Box channels in 2024 and others at the right time". At 23:59 on 30 June 2024, Magic TV closed, with its final music video being "End of the Road" by Boyz II Men.

== TV Shows ==
Da Kink In My Hair (2007)

Copper (2012)

Titanoboa: Monster Snake (2012)

Trading Places (2002)

Zoo Diaries (2000)

== Compilation albums ==
The channel has released several compilation albums.

Title	No. of discs	Release date	Artists Featured in This Album
The Sound of Magic	2	31 May 1999	Wet Wet Wet, Lighthouse Family, Elton John, Harry Nilsson, Vanessa Williams, Marvin Gaye, Commodores, Stevie Wonder, Diana Ross & Lionel Richie, Smokey Robinson, Randy Crawford, Peaches & Herb, Tina Turner, Kool & The Gang, Phyllis Nelson, Gallagher & Lyle, Captain & Tennille, Sad Café, Roxy Music, Robbie Williams, Bee Gees, Barry Manilow, Chris De Burgh, Oleta Adams, Bill Withers, Jennifer Rush, Dire Straits, Gerry Rafferty, Toto, The Cars, Foreigner, Leo Sayer, Joe Cocker & Jennifer Warnes, Procol Harum, Moody Blues, 10cc
The Sound of Magic Love	2	1 October 1999	Martine McCutcheon, Texas, Simply Red, Shania Twain, Take That, Lighthouse Family, Dina Carroll, Terence Trent D'Arby, Bill Withers, Mica Paris, Commodores, Jeffrey Osborne, Patti Austin & James Ingram, Billy Paul, Champaign, Al Green, Lisa Stansfield, Everything But The Girl, Elton John, Boyzone, The Corrs, Des'ree, Bee Gees, Bread, Hall & Oates, Korgis, Maria McKee, Paul Young, Eric Clapton, The Style Council, Eric Carmen, Dr Hook, The Real Thing, The Three Degrees, Jim Capaldi, Rod Stewart, The La's
More Sound of Magic	2	15 May 2000	Gabrielle, The Corrs, Boyzone, R. Kelly, Elton John, Seal, Crowded House, Dina Carroll, Peter Cetera, Bill Withers, Yvonne Elliman, Dobie Gray, Marvin Gaye, Bryan Ferry, Commodores, Dr Hook, Barry White, 10cc, Robert Palmer, Wet Wet Wet, Geri Halliwell, Sixpence None the Richer, Sheryl Crow, Backstreet Boys, Simply Red, Another Level, Bee Gees, Gloria Estefan & the Miami Sound Machine, Lighthouse Family, Paul Young, Paul Weller, Christopher Cross, Carly Simon, Labi Siffre, Mr. Mister, Black, Air Supply, The Christians, Ladysmith Black Mambazo feat Des'ree
Magic Vol.2	2	12 March 2001	LeAnn Rimes, Ronan Keating, Gabrielle, Simply Red, Diana Ross, Wet Wet Wet, Barry White, Yvonne Elliman, Elton John, Bee Gees, Aretha Franklin, Cat Stevens, Fat Larry's Band, Peter Frampton, Faith Hill, Michael Jackson, Eurythmics, Gallagher & Lyle, Al Green, Lonestar, Texas, The Corrs, Craig David, Savage Garden, Westlife, Lighthouse Family, Chris Rea, The Temptations, Chris De Burgh, Captain and Tennille, Nik Kershaw, Marvin Gaye, Dusty Springfield, The Sutherland Brothers, Stevie Wonder, Rita Coolidge, Kool and the Gang, Fleetwood Mac, Lionel Richie, Eva Cassidy
Magic – Summer Feeling	2	16 June 2003	S Club, Emma Bunton, David Sneddon, Shania Twain, Vanessa Carlton, DJ Sammy, Dido, George Michael, Appleton, Nelly Furtado, Style Council, The Corrs, Marti Pellow, Texas, Oleta Adams, Simply Red, Des'ree, Stevie Wonder, Bill Withers, Commodores, Ronan Keating, Elton John, Gabrielle, Boyzone, Elvis Costello, Dionne Warwick, Dusty Springfield, Aretha Franklin, Eurythmics, The Bangles, Deacon Blue, Lisa Loeb, Malachai, Rod Stewart, Lighthouse Family, Paul Young & Zucchero, Black, Jackson 5, Hall & Oates, Tavares
Magic – The Album	3	28 November 2005	James Blunt, Michael Bublé, Daniel Bedingfield, 10cc, Damien Rice, Craig David, Daniel Powter, Backstreet Boys, The Corrs, Aretha Franklin, Paul Weller, The Bangles, Linda Ronstadt feat Aaron Neville, LeAnn Rimes, The Judds, DJ Sammy & Yanou feat Do, Louis Armstrong, Van Morrison, The Isley Brothers, The Stranglers, UB40, Fleetwood Mac, Cyndi Lauper, Blondie, Boy Meets Girl, Foreigner, The Cars, East 17, Simply Red, The Bluebells, The Pretenders, Aztec Camera, Tears For Fears, A-ha, Marvin Gaye, Otis Redding, Randy Crawford, Gabrielle, Al Green, Beverley Craven, Atlantic Starr, Dawn Penn, Bee Gees, Chaka Khan with Rufus, Chic, Sheryl Crow, The B-52's, Cher, Shakespears Sister, Andreas Johnson
Summer Magic	2	15 May 2006	Will Young, Damien Rice, Katie Melua, Magnet, The Corrs, Ronan Keating, Simply Red, Bread, Foreigner, Chicago, David Gray, The Cars, The Everly Brothers, The Pretenders, Faith No More, Extreme, Everything But The Girl, Sinéad O'Connor, Gordon Haskell, Eva Cassidy, Lionel Richie, Lemar, Barry White, Lee Ryan, Craig David, Toni Braxton, Keisha White, Labi Siffre, Al Green, Jimmy Ruffin, Rose Royce, Ben E. King, Randy Crawford, Aretha Franklin, Otis Redding, Dionne Warwick, Percy Sledge, Phyllis Nelson, Anita Baker, Marvin Gaye
Mellow Magic	2	26 February 2007	Elvis Presley, Christina Aguilera, Michael Bolton, Whitney Houston, Simon & Garfunkel, Simply Red, The Bangles, Elton John & George Michael, Cyndi Lauper, Billy Paul, Katie Melua, Take That, Vanessa Williams, Foreigner, The Righteous Brothers, Bee Gees, Darren Hayes, Delta Goodrem, Eric Carmen, The Cars, Bette Midler, Bread, Karyn White, Billy Ocean, Beverly Craven, Peter Cetera, The Pretenders, Alison Moyet, Phil Collins, Luther Vandross, Randy Crawford, 10cc, The Mamas & Papas, Christopher Cross, Bill Withers, Toto, Savage Garden, Harold Melvin & The Blue Notes, Ben E King, Marvin Gaye, Otis Redding
Magic The Album 2007	2	20 August 2007	Michael Buble, James Morrison, Paolo Nutini, David Gray, Lionel Richie, Ronan Keating, Sugababes, Simply Red, The Pretenders, A-ha, Wet Wet Wet, Candi Staton, Leann Rimes, Andrea Corr, KC & The Sunshine Band, Luther Vandross, Toploader, Eternal feat Bebe Winans, Johnny Nash, Dobie Gray, Labi Siffre, George Michael, James Blunt, Will Young, Bread, Chicago, Joe Cocker feat Jennifer Warnes, Sixpence None The Richer, Shawn Colvin, The Beautiful South, Aretha Franklin, Maria Muldaur, The Real Thing, Jackie Wilson, The Drifters, The Four Tops, The Monkees, UB40 feat Chrissie Hynde, Aqualung, Nerina Pallot, John Paul Young, Bobby Darin
Magic Decades	3	19 November 2007	Marvin Gaye, Terence Trent D'Arby, Lionel Richie, Simply Red, Chicago, Wet Wet Wet, The Pretenders, Fine Young Cannibals, Aztec Camera, A-ha, Laura Branigan, Howard Jones, Sister Sledge, Christopher Cross, Detroit Spinners, Patti Austin & James Ingram, Grover Washington, Jr., Womack & Womack, Teddy Pendergrass, Randy Crawford, Seal, Prince, Toni Braxton, Savage Garden, Simply Red, Alannah Myles, Marc Cohn, Paula Cole, Mr. Big, Donna Lewis, Julee Cruise, Eddi Reader, East 17 feat Gabrielle, All Saints, En Vogue, Brand New Heavies, Brandy & Monica, Everything But The Girl, KD Lang, Cher, James Blunt, Michael Buble, James Morrison, Will Young, Westlife, LeAnn Rimes & Brian McFadden, Kelly Rowland, Damien Rice, Josh Groban, David Gray, Ronan Keating, Jamie Scott & The Town, Peter Cincotti, Luther Vandross, Alicia Keys, All Saints, Gnarls Barkley, Vanessa Carlton, Darren Hayes, Anastacia
Magic Ballads	2	9 November 2009	James Morrison feat Nelly Furtado, Take That, Michael Buble, ABBA, Patrick Swayze, Rod Stewart, P!nk, Mariah Carey, Christina Aguilera, Ronan Keating, Fleetwood Mac, Dido, The Righteous Brothers, Daniel Bedingfield, Toni Braxton, Eric Carmen, Nilsson, Jennifer Rush, Celine Dion, Whitney Houston, Michael Jackson, Will Young, The Bangles, The Script, Simon & Garfunkel, Bill Withers, Luther Vandross, Alicia Keys, Lemar, Ben E. King, Billy Ocean, Toto, Atlantic Starr, Rose Royce, Beverley Craven, Gloria Estefan, Cyndi Lauper, Labi Siffre, Westlife, Daniel Merriweather
Magic Summertime	3	15 July 2013	Mark Ronson feat Amy Winehouse, ABBA, Michael Jackson, Wham!, Justin Timberlake, Gnarls Barkley, Jennifer Lopez, Ricky Martin, Katrina & The Waves, Shakira, Billy Joel, The Rembrandts, Rick Astley, Gloria Estefan & Miami Sound Machine, Anastacia, Des'ree, Gabrielle, Sixpence None The Richer, Shania Twain, DJ Jazzy Jeff & The Fresh Prince, Jamiroquai, Luther Vandross, The Isley Brothers, Savage Garden, Donna Summer, Kool and The Gang, Martha Reeves & The Vandellas, Deee-Lite, The Drifters, Otis Redding, 10cc, Big Mountain, Peter Andre, Arrow, Gipsy Kings, Los Lobos, Boney M, Bananarama, Barry Manilow, The B-52's, Roy Orbison, Bill Withers, The Beach Boys, The Foundations, Blondie, Billy Idol, Duran Duran, Kim Wilde, Spandau Ballet, Irene Cara, Haircut 100, The Boo Radleys, KC and the Sunshine Band, The Lotus Eaters, The Lovin' Spoonful, The Style Council, Nik Kershaw, The Gibson Brothers, Mungo Jerry, John Travolta & Olivia Newton-John
Mellow Magic	3	17 March 2014	Take That, George Michael, Christina Aguilera, P!nk feat Nate Ruess, Whitney Houston, Celine Dion, Justin Timberlake, Dido, Ellie Goulding, Luther Vandross, Will Young, The Righteous Brothers, Patrick Swayze feat Wendy Fraser, Lonestar, Sarah McLachlan, Natasha Bedingfield, Savage Garden, Lissie, The Script, Billy Joel, Gary Barlow, Labrinth feat Emeli Sandé, Dusty Springfield, Shakira, Leona Lewis, Britney Spears, Simply Red, Jamiroquai, Mr. Mister, Michael Bolton, Gloria Estefan & Miami Sound Machine, Labi Siffre, Delta Goodrem, Rebecca Ferguson, JLS, Terence Trent D'Arby, Eric Carmen, Foreigner, Elvis Presley, Robbie Williams, Ben E. King, Alicia Keys, Paloma Faith, John Legend, R. Kelly, Alexander O'Neal, Alexandra Burke, Lisa Stansfield, Toni Braxton, The Jacksons, Phyllis Nelson, The Chimes, Usher, Petula Clark, Harold Melvin & The Blue Notes, Simon & Garfunkel, Cyndi Lauper, Bob Dylan
Magic: The Collection	3	2 March 2015	Pharrell Williams, Bruno Mars, George Ezra, Magic!, Scissor Sisters, Bill Medley & Jennifer Warnes, Billy Joel, Olly Murs feat Travie McCoy, Ella Henderson, Justin Timberlake, John Legend, Paloma Faith, P!nk feat Nate Ruess, Labrinth feat Emeli Sandé, Kelly Clarkson, Whitney Houston, Ben Haenow, Robbie Williams, George Michael & Elton John, Take That, One Direction, Alicia Keys, Ellie Goulding, Dido, Christina Aguilera, Annie Lennox, R.E.M., The Script, Passenger, Will Young, Natalie Imbruglia, Sarah McLachlan, Des'ree, Tom Odell, Mr. Probz, The Tony Rich Project, Eva Cassidy, Sophie B. Hawkins, Rumer, Gary Barlow, A-ha, Fleetwood Mac, Culture Club, Philip Oakey & Giorgio Moroder, Cyndi Lauper, Mr. Mister, Starship, The Bangles, Luther Vandross, ABBA, Nik Kershaw, Boy George, Feargal Sharkey, Phyllis Nelson, Belinda Carlisle, Dee C. Lee, Alison Moyet, Stereophonics
Magic: The Album	3	26 February 2016	Mark Ronson feat Bruno Mars, Take That, Sam Smith, Charlie Puth feat Meghan Trainor, Billy Joel, The Bangles, ABBA, Fleetwood Mac, George Ezra, Jamie Lawson, Grace, Wet Wet Wet, Savage Garden, Spandau Ballet, Luther Vandross, Alicia Keys, Celine Dion, Whitney Houston, Robbie Williams, Train, Dido The Corrs, Rumer, Lonestar, Eric Carmen, Big Mountain, Lighthouse Family, Toploader, The Connells, Gregory Abbott, Lisa Stansfield, Erasure, Dan Hill, Beverley Craven, Bonnie Tyler, Westlife, Kylie Minogue, Eurythmics, Blondie, The Pointer Sisters, Hall & Oates, Billy Ocean, M People, Chic, Electric Light Orchestra, Roxy Music, The Righteous Brothers, Don McLean, Lynyrd Skynyrd, The Beach Boys, Marvin Gaye, The Monkees, Jackie Wilson, Erma Franklin, Elvis Presley
Magic 80s	4	23 February 2018	Queen, Culture Club, The Human League, Duran Duran, Lionel Richie, Cyndi Lauper, A-ha, Frankie Goes To Hollywood, Spandau Ballet, Tears for Fears, Wet Wet Wet, UB40, ABC, Level 42, The Bangles, Bananarama, Irene Cara, Tiffany, Kylie Minogue, Rick Astley, Simple Minds, Bon Jovi, Cher, Belinda Carlisle, Blondie, Kim Wilde, Huey Lewis and the News, Soft Cell, Heaven 17, Living in a Box, Johnny Hates Jazz, Hue and Cry, Cutting Crew, Heart, Berlin, Alison Moyet, Joe Cocker & Jennifer Warnes, Danny Wilson, Dexys Midnight Runners, Elton John, Fleetwood Mac, Bryan Adams, Sting, Roxy Music, Nik Kershaw, Roxette, Madness, Tears for Fears, Fine Young Cannibals, Hall & Oates, The Pretenders, Crowded House, The Style Council, The Human League, Kim Carnes, Swing Out Sister, The Housemartins, The Proclaimers, The Communards, Yazz and the Plastic Population, Tina Turner, T'Pau, Culture Club, Curiosity Killed the Cat, Aswad, Billy Ocean, Soul II Soul, Rufus and Chaka Khan, Diana Ross, Jermaine Stewart, Kool and the Gang, Lipps Inc., Giorgio Moroder & Phil Oakley, Womack & Womack, Alexander O'Neal, The Whispers, Cameo, Paula Abdul, DeBarge, ABBA
Magic 90s	4	29 March 2019	George Michael, Take That, Natalie Imbruglia, Spice Girls, Robbie Williams, Shania Twain, Sheryl Crow, The Corrs, Backstreet Boys, Jamiroquai, Boyzone, Britney Spears, Christina Aguilera, All Saints, Gabrielle, Lenny Kravitz, Seal, Lighthouse Family, Kylie Minogue, Cher, Eternal feat Bebe Winans, Fugees, Des'ree, Tasmin Archer, M People, Peter Andre, Mark Morrison, TLC, Destiny's Child feat Wyclef Jean, Brandy & Monica, Aqua, Ultra Naté, Moloko, CeCe Peniston, Bobby Brown, Robin S, Snap!, Adamski & Seal, Livin' Joy, D Ream, Simply Red, Texas, Duran Duran, The Beautiful South, Jennifer Paige, The Cardigans, New Radicals, Crowded House, Travis, 4 Non Blondes, Eagle-Eye Cherry, Hanson, The Mavericks, Extreme, Lonestar, Scorpions, Paul Weller, Elton John, Maxi Priest, UB40, Robbie Williams, Whitney Houston, Ronan Keating, Celine Dion, Westlife, Michael Bolton, The Pretenders, Roxette, Charles & Eddie, Shola Ama, Shanice, Toni Braxton, Oleta Adams, Tina Arena, Beverley Craven, Sarah McLachlan, Maria McKee, Richard Marx, Lionel Richie, Vanessa Williams
Magic 90s: The Songs You Love	3	16 October 2020	Take That, Natalie Imbruglia, The Beautiful South, Texas, New Radicals, Shania Twain, Ricky Martin, Jennifer Lopez, Céline Dion, Tina Arena, Belinda Carlisle, Jennifer Paige, Sophie B. Hawkins, Crowded House, Richard Marx, Sarah McLachlan, Beverley Craven, Fugees, Youssou N'Dour feat Neneh Cherry, Ronan Keating, Robbie Williams, Backstreet Boys, Britney Spears, Wet Wet Wet, Deacon Blue, Paula Abdul, Wilson Phillips, Annie Lennox, 4 Non Blondes, Michael Bolton, Cher, Sheryl Crow, Terence Trent D'Arby feat Des'ree, Gabrielle, M People, Lighthouse Family, Jon Secada, Gloria Estefan, Westlife, Boyzone, Gary Barlow, Charles & Eddie, Steps, Donna Summer, Whitney Houston, Destiny's Child, Shanice, Cyndi Lauper, UB40, Jamiroquai, Lisa Stansfield, Dina Carroll, P.M. Dawn, Soul II Soul, DJ Jazzy Jeff & The Fresh Prince, Boyz II Men, Toni Braxton, Vanessa Williams
Magic Radio Presents Magic Soul	3	14 May 2021	Stevie Wonder, Diana Ross & The Supremes, Martha Reeves & The Vandellas, The Four Tops, The Temptation, James Brown, The Staple Singers, Freda Payne, Marvin Gaye, Jimmy Ruffin, Bill Withers, Billy Paul, Gladys Knight & the Pips, Erma Franklin, Mary Wells, Edwin Starr, Smokey Robinson & The Miracles, Jackie Wilson, Lou Rawls, Sly and the Family Stone, The Delfonics, Marlena Shaw, Dusty Springfield, Earth, Wind & Fire, McFadden & Whitehead, The Emotions, Cheryl Lynn, LaBelle, Donna Summer, A Taste of Honey, Kool & the Gang, Barry White, Isaac Hayes, The Miracles, The O'Jays, The Tymes, Heatwave, Deniece Williams, Odyssey, Stephanie Mills, The Pointer Sisters, The Isley Brothers, Third World, Tavares, Harold Melvin & the Blue Notes, Luther Vandross, Marvin Gaye, Commodity Place, Diana Ross, Ashford & Simpson, Aretha Franklin, Alexander O'Neal, Jermaine Jackson, Tom Browne, Evelyn 'Champagne' King, Phyllis Hyman, Mary Jane Girls, Dennis Edwards feat Siedah Garrett, Champaign, Mica Paris, Jennifer Hudson, Soul II Soul, The Chimes, Whitney Houston, Toni Braxton
Magic Radio - 100% Summer: The 80s	3	17 June 2022	Wham!, Katrina and the Waves, Men at Work, Matthew Wilder, Dexys Midnight Runners, ABC, Haircut 100, Owen Paul, The Bangles, Blondie, Aswad, Maxi Priest, UB40, Deniece Williams, KC and the Sunshine Band, Billy Ocean, DeBarge, Gloria Estefan & The Miami Sound Machine, Sade, Kool & the Gang, Bruce Willis, Yazz and The Plastic Population, Whitney Houston, Diana Ross, Donna Summer, Michael Sembello, The Pointer Sisters, Lipps Inc, Harold Faltermeyer, Ashford & Simpson, Soul II Soul, Mica Paris, The Fat Boys & The Beach Boys, Salt-N-Pepa, Sabrina, Modern Talking, Ryan Paris, Milli Vanilli, Five Star, Michael Jackson, Smokey Robinson, Bill Medley and Jennifer Warnes, Kenny Loggins, Toto, Mr. Mister, Eric Carmen, Hall & Oates, REO Speedwagon, Mike Oldfield, Fairground Attraction, Danny Wilson, Wet Wet Wet, Roachford, James Brown, Level 42, Shakatak, Bucks Fizz, Culture Club, Nik Kershaw, The Lotus Eaters, Paul Young
