= 4mations =

Video hosting service

- Company type: Channel 4 project, backed by Aardman Animations and Lupus Films
- Website type: Video hosting service
- Available in: English
- Founded: 2008
- Headquarters: Bristol, {{{location_country}}}
- Owner: Channel 4
- Key people: Adam Gee (Channel 4), New Media Commissioner; Rohini Denton / Paul Deane (Aardman Animations), Producer; Mel Kirk (Aardman Animations), Communities Manager; Camilla Deakin (Lupus Films), CEO & Founder; Rachel Roberts (Lupus Films), Producer
- Registration: Optional (required to upload and to comment on videos)
- Launched: July 4, 2008
- Current status: Unavailable (Website for sale)

4mations was a website where users can upload, view, and share animated films and games. The site was founded in 2008 by the Channel Four Television Corporation, sponsored by Aardman Animations and Lupus Films. As the site was targeted to adults, risqué animations were often featured.

== History ==
Channel 4 commissioned the project, backed by Aardman Animations and Lupus Films and it was in development for two years before its launch. The project team then sent out a call for submissions to commission some animations and the beta site launched in August 2008. The main site launched in September 2008. In November 2008 the site was taken down by Channel 4 in order to remove some adult content from the site.

The site relaunched on 1 June 2009 as an animation blog featuring director interviews, user-submitted clips and news and reviews from the animation world.

== Features ==
=== User accounts ===
The free user account includes access to upload animation films and games as well as viewing and commenting on other user's content.

Uploading films and games makes users eligible for a £250 prizefund which is awarded monthly for the most viewed content.

- Profile: Each 4mations user has their own individual profile page which displays their username, a description (written by the user), a URL, their videos/games and the content that they've marked as favorites.
- Groups: 4mations allow the creation of user groups between users with something in common (for example, fans of an experimental films, a genre of animation, or membership of another internet forum). Any user may start a group and invite members. Each of the members of the groups can initiate or contribute to a discussion.
- Friends: Users are able to create friends lists with whom they can share animations that they upload or find on the site.
- Messages: The site provides the facility for you to send a direct message to one or more 4mations user. Depending on how the users have set their preferences, this will then send an email to the user's private email address, prompting them to check their 4mations account.

== Tags ==
From launch, 4mations supports user-end tagging or labeling of films and game to create a site-wide folksonomy of animated content. Users can browse via tags enabling users to play content that has been tagged a certain way. This tagging can be by genre, mood, creator, or any other form of user-defined classification.

== Categories ==
Videos can be viewed by selecting the most discussed, the top rated, the most watched, featured videos (which are highlighted by the 4mations team) or the newest to be uploaded. Alternatively users can determine the category they wish to look at by channel or format.

Games can be viewed by selecting the most discussed, the top rated, most played, featured games (which are highlighted by the 4mations team) or the newest to be uploaded. Alternatively users can choose a category of game they wish to play.

== Subscription ==
A user can choose to subscribe to either a tag or specific user, which are then displayed on the "subscriptions" page. Alternatively, users can choose to receive these subscriptions via an RSS feed.

== Similar services ==
- Atom Films
- Newgrounds
- Adult Swim
- Aniboom
- Channel Frederator
- Animation World Network
- MyToons
- B3ta
