= Kiss TV =

British television channel

- Country: United Kingdom
- Broadcast area: United Kingdom
- Affiliates: Bauer Media Audio UK
- Headquarters: London

Ownership
- Owner: Channel Four Television Corporation
- Sister channels: Channel 4; 4seven; E4; E4 Extra; Film4; More4; 4Music; The Box; Kerrang!; Magic

History
- Launched: 30 May 1996; 28 years ago (original); 26 June 2000; 24 years ago
- Closed: 30 June 2024; 9 months ago

Kiss TV was a music video television channel owned by Channel Four Television based on the format of the Bauer Media Audio UK-owned national radio station Kiss.

The channel's programming predominantly consisted of classic and mainstream hip-hop, dance, grime, EDM and R&B music videos.

== History ==
The original incarnation of Kiss TV was created by Guy Wingate, who worked in EMAP's fledgling TV division with then Kiss Chief Executive and the station's original founder, Gordon 'Mac' McNamee. Launched on 30 May 1996, the channel ran for one hour a night on the Mirror Group's L!VE TV cable circuit and in June 1997 moved to the Granada satellite and cable platform, taking a similar slot in the evening. The channel was closed in January 1998.

The channel's presenters included DJs such as BBC Radio 1's Judge Jules. By the time the channel was one year old, it had attracted major sponsorship from blue-chip brands such as Levi's, Sony consumer products and The Guardian.

== Closure ==
On 29 January 2024, Channel 4 announced that Kiss TV and its sister channels would be closing as part of the future plans of the company leading up to 2030.

In the press release, it is stated that Channel 4 are "Proposing to close small linear channels that no longer deliver revenues or public value at scale, including the Box channels in 2024 and others at the right time". At 23:59 on 30 June 2024, Kiss TV closed, with its final music video being "Don't Stop the Music" by Rihanna.

== Availability ==
The channel was available on digital television platforms and was part of a network of channels owned by The Box Plus Network. On 2 April 2013, all Box Television channels went free-to-air on satellite, apart from 4Music which went free-to-view. As a result, the channels were removed from the Sky EPG in Ireland. However, Kiss TV launched on Freesat on 15 April 2013, alongside three other Box Television channels. Kiss TV and its sister channels returned to Freesat on 8 December 2021.

Kiss TV also broadcast in Sub-Saharan Africa as a Pay-TV channel, through various digital TV providers without commercials. Music videos were played in place of commercials.

== See also ==
- Kiss Network
- Kiss 100 London
- Kiss 101
- Kiss 105-108
