= Box Hits =

British television channel

- Logo used from 2016 to 2022
- Country: United Kingdom

Ownership
- Owner: The Box Plus Network (Channel Four Television Corporation)
- Sister channels: 4Music; The Box; Kerrang!; Kiss; Magic

History
- Launched: 15 May 2001
- Closed: 29 June 2022
- Replaced by: 4Music (second version)
- Former names: Smash Hits (2001–2016)

Box Hits (formerly Smash Hits) was a British commercial television channel owned by Channel Four Television Corporation. The channel broadcast general pop music in shows such as Chartbusters, which was recent music and Pop Domination, which showcased new and old music. It also shows other programmes such as themed countdowns and charts such as Top 50 Boy Bands. The channel also had hours dedicated to a particular artist or band such as Pussycat Dolls: Ultimate 10. It was originally based on the former Smash Hits magazine, which was owned by EMAP. The channel shut down on 29 June 2022 at 6am and was replaced with a new version of 4Music.

The channel was available on a number of platforms including Sky and Virgin Media. It was part of a network of channels owned by The Box Plus Network, which includes 4Music, The Box, Kerrang!, Kiss and Magic. All of these channels were in Channel 4's main business operations, until they all closed at 23:59 on 30 June 2024, due to budget cuts.

== History ==
On 2 April 2013, all Box Television channels went free-to-air on satellite, apart from 4Music which went free-to-view. As a result, the channels were removed from the Sky EPG in Ireland. Smash Hits launched on Freesat on 15 April 2013, alongside three other Box Television channels. Box Hits and its sister channels (except 4Music) returned to Freesat on 8 December 2021 alongside C4 HD.

On 25 May 2016, the channel was rebranded as Box Hits.

Smash Hits TV was also the name given to a spin-off TV show broadcast on Sky One in 2001.

It used to broadcast general mainstream pop music on a "jukebox" system, where viewers had to call a premium rate telephone number to select a music video to play.

From 27 September 2021 to 6 October 2021, Box Hits broadcast a simulcast of Kiss after the activation of a fire suppressant system at the premises of Red Bee Media on 25 September 2021. It was restored on 7 October 2021, while a simulcast of it simultaneously launched on 4Music, replacing The Box.

On 13 June 2022, Channel 4 announced that Box Hits' channel slot would be replaced with 4Music on 29 June 2022. This was part of a channel reshuffle where E4 Extra would take over 4Music's old slot, while 4Music would transition back to a full-time music schedule in the ex-Box Hits slot, thus effectively ending the Box Hits branding and the channel itself altogether. On 29 June 2022 at 6am, it closed by repeating the ident before freezing. The Box closed about 2 years later on 30 June 2024, after 32 years on air.

== Programming ==
- Massive Chart Hits – The best chart toppers back to back!
- Non-Stop Big Hits – We've got all the biggest videos from the biggest stars right here all through the night!
- Buzzin' with Big Hits – Nothing but the biggest hits around from the biggest artists on the planet, right here, right now!
- OMG! It's ... Years Since... – The best music videos from a selected number of years ago.
- Totally... – 30 minutes of the biggest music videos from your favourite artist.
- From Day 1 – Selected artist retrospective. Formally presented by Will Best, Kiss Radio's AJ King, or Kiss 100's Manny Norte (also used to be available on Kiss TV, Box Upfront, and The Box), it is now presented by the selected artist. The programme also airs on 4Music.
- All the Hits, All Weekend – We've got your weekend soundtrack sorted with the hottest music around!
- Official UK Airplay Chart Top 20 – 20 most-played songs played across UK radio stations in the last week.
- UK HOTLIST Top 20 – Will Best provides 20 most-streamed tracks of the week as compiled by Spotify.
- Face Off! – Music videos from two different artists.
- Hotmix – Exclusive non-stop mix of the hottest tracks to soundtrack your life!
- Let's Go! Monday Mood Boosters – We're getting your week off to the best start with the biggest mood-boosting tunes to brighten up Monday morning.
- Turn Up The Party – Saturday Night is on! Join us for a Massive playlist of party tunes that will make you blow your mind. (This programme was dropped in 2022 when it was replaced with two new shows, Get The Party started and Ultimate Party Anthems.)
- No 1 Party Hits – We've got your night sorted with a mix of The biggest Number 1 songs from the party world. (This programme usually airs on long weekends Easter, May, Spring and summer.
