= 4Music =

British music television channel

- Final logo, used from 2018 to 2024
- Country: United Kingdom
- Broadcast area: United Kingdom, Ireland

Ownership
- Owner: Channel Four Television Corporation
- Sister channels: Channel 4; 4seven; E4; E4 Extra; Film4; More4; The Box; Kerrang!; Kiss; Magic

History
- Launched: 15 August 2008; 18 years ago (original); 29 June 2022; 4 years ago (relaunch as music channel)
- Replaced: The Hits (original); Box Hits (2022)
- Closed: 29 June 2022; 4 years ago (original); 30 June 2024; 2 years ago (relaunch as music channel)
- Replaced by: E4 Extra (original)
- Former names: The Hits (2002–2008; original); Smash Hits (2001–2016); Box Hits (2016–2022)

4Music was a British music television channel owned and operated by Channel Four Television Corporation. Launched on 15 August 2008, the original incarnation, replacing The Hits television channel, showed a mix of music and entertainment programming.

On 29 June 2022, 4Music transitioned to a full-time channel on the space formerly containing Box Hits, with E4 Extra, a new sister channel and extension of E4, taking over its original space. On 30 June 2024, the channel, along with its sister Channel 4 (formerly The Box Plus Network) music TV channels, closed for the final time.

== History ==
=== Launch and early years ===
The channel launched in 2008 with a ten-minute, on-screen countdown. During the countdown, clips from popular music videos were faded through the screen, including clips from promotions for the channel. The channel then launched at 7 pm.

Live coverage of the 2008 V Festival was shown on 16 and 17 August, with highlights shown on subsequent days.

The launch also saw a new Digital on-screen graphic appear on the screen, and new idents with a woman swivelling on a chair with the channel's logo in the background.

=== 2013–2024 ===
On 2 April 2013, all Box Television channels went free-to-air on satellite, apart from 4Music which went free-to-view. As a result, the channels were removed from the Sky EPG in Ireland. Eventually, 4Music also went free-to-air on 7 February 2017 and launched on Freesat, replacing The Box, but reverted to being free-to-view on 12 December 2018. On 25 January 2022, a new transmission of 4Music free-to-air on satellite began, with a post from a Sky employee on the official Sky customer forums subsequently confirming that the free-to-air version would replace the FTV version on the Sky guide from 1 February.

The move back to free-to-air permitted the readdition of 4Music back to the Freesat channel guide from 1 February 2022, following soon after the restoration of the Box Plus Network's music channels and Channel 4 HD to full Freesat listing, after a period during which they had only been available via manual tune-in. On 1 March 2022, 4Music was restored to Sky in Ireland.

On 25 September 2017, 4Music received an update to its on-screen graphics, revolving around four squares which extend to create the 4Music logo and animate to form the artist credit. In 2018, 4Music changed its logo to add the current Channel 4 logo to it, with '4' and 'Music' mashed up together. This change also happened to its other channels.

From 16 April 2018, the channel now shows more entertainment programmes as well as archive Channel 4 programming to coincide with a change in the EPG numbers on Sky from 1 May 2018.

On 4 November 2020, 4Music moved from channel 29 to 30 as part of a move up where every channel from channel 24 to 54 on the platform moved up one place to allow BBC Four to move to channel 24 in Scotland due to new Ofcom rules regarding certain PSB channels requiring greater prominence on EPGs. This is because the BBC Scotland channel is on channel 9 in Scotland, whilst BBC Four is on channel 9 in the rest of the UK. On 26 January 2022, a similar shuffle down of channels – to free up LCN 23 nationwide for the revived BBC Three – saw 4Music moved again, to 31 (with E4 +1 in turn taking over 30).

Transmission of 4Music and other channels operated by Channel 4 was impacted by the activation of a fire suppressant system at the premises of Red Bee Media on 25 September 2021. From 27 September to 6 October 2021, 4Music simulcasted the output of The Box, in place of usual scheduled programming, with a note shown on EPGs about the technical problems. The simulcast was changed to Box Hits on 7 October 2021, while output from 4Music was restored on 15 October, though initially with music videos only. Longform programming returned to the channel on 9 November, beginning at 12.07pm with Couples Come Dine with Me. The last song played before longform programming resumed was "Remember" by Becky Hill and David Guetta.

On 13 June 2022, Channel 4 announced that 4Music's channel slot would be replaced with E4 Extra on 29 June 2022. 4Music itself would transition to Box Hits' slot. With the change, the channel transitioned back to being a full-time music channel.

=== Closure ===
On 29 January 2024, Channel 4 announced that 4Music and its sister channels would be closing as part of the future plans of the company leading up to 2030.

In the press release, it is stated that Channel 4 are "Proposing to close small linear channels that no longer deliver revenues or public value at scale, including the Box channels in 2024 and others at the right time". At 23:59 on 30 June 2024, 4Music closed, with its final music video being "Raise Your Glass" by Pink.

== Programming ==
=== Entertainment Programming (until 2022) ===
Programmes shown on the channel as of Tuesday 9 November 2021: From June 29, 2022, these programmes transitioned to other Channel 4 networks, E4 and E4 Extra.

==== Acquired programming (2018–2022) ====
- Buffy the Vampire Slayer (2021–22)
- Charmed (2018–22) (Note: the original WB series from the late 1990s, not the 2018 revival series. Both iterations of the show were shown first on E4.) (this was the first non-music programme to be shown on 4music in the daytime.)
- Duncanville (2022; Initially planned) Season 1 aired on Channel 4 and E4 in 2020. Season 2 aired on E4 in 2021.
- The Goldbergs (2021–22) This American comedy series, which started on US TV in 2013, has also been seen on E4.
- Harley Quinn (2022)
- How I Met Your Mother (2019–22)
- Malcolm in the Middle (2020–22)
- Rick and Morty (2021–22) (some episodes debuted in the UK on E4, others on TruTV)
- Sabrina the Teenage Witch (2019–22)
- Scrubs (2019–22, previously shown in the UK on E4 from 2002 to 2010)
- Wipeout USA (2021–22)

==== Programming from Channel 4/E4 (2014–2022) ====
- 8 Out of 10 Cats Uncut (2014–22)
- 8 Out of 10 Cats Does Countdown (2021–22)
- The Big Fat Quiz of Everything (2022)
- Catastrophe (2022)
- Dead Pixels (2022)
- Don't Tell the Bride (2019–22)
- Friday Night Dinner (2020–22) [As part of 4Music's "Box Set Fri" segment]
- The IT Crowd (2019–22)
- Naked Attraction (2021) (currently part of E4's schedules)
- Stath Lets Flats (2022)
- Taskmaster (2021–22) (earlier series originally debuted on Dave)
- Travel Man (2021–22)

==== Programming from Channel 4 (2016–2022) ====
- Celebs Go Dating (2019–21)
- Coach Trip (2019–21)
- Come Dine with Me (2020–21)
- Father Ted (2021–22) (now shown on E4 Extra)
- Man Down (2021–22)
- Rude Tube (2016–21)
- Tattoo Fixers (2020–21)
- The Windsors (2020)

==== Original programming (2010–2019) ====
- Bronx Tales: The Influence (part of Hip Hop Season) (2016–19) (also on Netflix UK)
- Nicki Minaj: Day in the Life (2012)
- Nicole Scherzinger: Day in the Life (2013)
- Olly Murs: Day in the Life (2012)
- Real Stories (2011–14)
- The Saturdays: What Goes On Tour (2011)

==== Programming from Channel 4 (2010–2019) ====
The channel is also well known for repeating some of Channel 4's shows. Most of the shows listed below can also be found on E4, as that is a Channel Four Television Corporation service with a target market range of 16–34 years-of-age. As of September 2019, 4Music showed the following Channel 4 programmes in its schedule:

- Alan Carr's Celebrity Ding Dong
- Alan Carr: Chatty Man
- Balls of Steel (now on All 4)
- Balls of Steel Australia (made by Endemol Australia/Foxtel for The Comedy Channel in Australia but broadcast in the UK by E4)
- Banzai (now on All 4)
- Bo' Selecta!
- Derren Brown (now on All 4)
- Distraction (now on All 4)
- Facejacker
- Fonejacker
- Friday/Sunday Night Project
- Girls Aloud: Off the Record
- The Inbetweeners (UK TV series) (now on All 4 and repeated on E4, also on E4 Extra)
- The Inbetweeners (U.S. TV series – actually made by Viacom's MTV but broadcast in the UK by E4)
- The Kevin Bishop Show
- Modern Toss
- No Angels (Series 1 only) (now on All 4)
- Peep Show (now on All 4)
- Rock School
- Russell Brand's Ponderland
- Shipwrecked (now on All 4)
- Spaced (now on All 4)
- Star Stories (now on All 4)
- Sugar Rush (now on All 4)
- Trigger Happy TV (now on All 4)
- Trigger Happy TV USA (this version was made for Viacom's Comedy Central channel in the U.S. but was broadcast in the UK on Channel 4)
- TV Offal
- Your Face or Mine? (the version hosted by Jimmy Carr and June Sarpong, not the revival made for Viacom's Comedy Central channel in the UK)

==== Other former programming (2008–2021) ====
- 2 Broke Girls (2015–19)
- 90210 (2018, shown on E4 from 2009 to 2013)
- American Idol (Season 15 only) (2016)
- Anger Management (2019)
- Angie Tribeca (2019–21) (Note: the first couple of seasons of this TBS comedy were shown in the UK by E4)
- Animals Unleashed (2019)
- Being... N-Dubz (shown exclusively to 4music from 2010 to 2011)
- Black-ish (2021)
- Broad City (Season 2+) (2015)
- Charlie's Angels (2016)
- Chasing The Saturdays (2013)
- The Dance Scene (2010–11)
- Frasier (2019)
- The Good Place (2020)
- The Hollyoaks Music Show (2009–11)
- I Am Cait (2016)
- Joe and Caspar Hit The Road (2016)
- Keeping Up With the Kardashians (2010–21) (first run on E!)
- King of the Hill (2018–20)
- Kocktails with Khloé (2016)
- Kourtney and Kim Take Miami (2010–14)
- Kourtney and Kim Take New York (2012–14)
- Kourtney and Khloé Take The Hamptons (2015)
- Love & Hip Hop: Hollywood (2017)
- Man with a Plan (2021)
- Mariah's World (2018) (from E!)
- Melissa & Joey (2021)
- New Girl (2019–20)
- Not Safe with Nikki Glaser (2016)
- Pussycat Dolls Present: Girlicious (2008)
- The Ren & Stimpy Show (2013)
- Rob Kardashian and Chyna (2019)
- Roswell (2014)
- Schitt's Creek (2019)
- Sex and the City (2018)
- The Simple Life (2008–10)
- Snoop Dogg's Father Hood (2008–09)
- Speechless (2021)
- Sun, Sex and Suspicious Parents (2016) (from BBC Three)
- Supernatural (2019)
- Tim and Eric Awesome Show, Great Job! (2011–12)
- The World According to Paris (2011)
- Xena: Warrior Princess (2017)

=== Music programming ===
- Box Fresh – A campaign launched at the beginning of 2017 as a replacement for the Box Upfront series of shows (excluding The Official Box Upfront Chart).
- Fresh Forward – Abbie McCarthy and Yinka Bokinni present new artists and new music.
- From Day 1 – Selected artist/band retrospective. Formerly presented by Will Best, Kiss Radio's AJ King, or Kiss 100's Manny Norte, it is now presented by the selected artist/band.
- Hitlist – Your day starts here join us as we play your get out of bed playlist.
- The Hotmix – A playlist of tracks that are cut down and edited to flow smoothly into the next track.
- The Saturday Night Hotmix – A Saturday night variant of The Hotmix.
- Showdown: ... vs ... – Music videos from two different artists.
- UK HOTLIST – Top 20 & 40 videos of the most streamed tracks on Spotify in the last week.
- The UK Music Video Chart – With data supplied by YouTube, The UKMVC supplies you with the most watched music videos of the week.

==== Former music programming ====
- 4Music Big Ones – A selection of pre-released and released singles. It plays all genres of music such as hip-hop, rock, pop, R&B, dance, folk, indie etc.
- The 4Music Buzz Chart – The first "4Music Buzz Chart" was broadcast on 18 August 2008 at 12:00 am. It shows a selection of pre-released songs charted into a top 10, similar to sister channel The Box's "Box Breakers". The first number one in the chart was "Jump in the Pool" by Friendly Fires and Bombay Bicycle Club's "Always Like This". The programme is no longer shown.
- 4Music Doubles – Two music videos by artists or bands. The first video, being their newest song, the second video, being their most successful song. "Imma Be" and "Where Is the Love?" is an example by The Black Eyed Peas.
- 4Play!... – 4 videos from a one artist or group.
- 100% Super Hits – The chart tracks of the moment.
- The A-List Playlist – The biggest music videos right now.
- The Crush – A monthly show called The Crush (sponsored by KFC Krushems milkshakes) was hosted by Rick Edwards and later T4 host Will Best and contains interviews with artists that are releasing new albums and single in that month.
- Fresh Music Top 20 – Formerly, the 4Music Top 20, this is a chart compiled by 4Music of the "biggest" and "best" videos from the current week. The first ever This Week's 4Music Top 20 Chart was broadcast on 19 March 2009 at 3:45 pm. Replaced by UK HOTLIST Top 20.
- From the Beginning – All of the music videos from a certain artist are played, from their first right through to the present day. They have included Take That, P!nk, Mariah Carey, Westlife and Girls Aloud. Replaced by From The Start, and now airs on Box Hits.
- From The Start – Selected artist retrospective, from career memory lane – to today; this program replaces From Day 1, and From The Beginning, and is now aired on Box Hits.
- Hangout's – Interviews with the trending artists, while also playing their biggest releases and newest singles.
- Hit Mornings With Pandora
- Homecoming – Artists (such as Tom Walker in the episode broadcast on 27 September 2019) go back to their hometown.
- Hot 10 in 10 – 10 huge tracks edited into a 10-minute remix like The Hotmix.
- The Month with Miquita – A review of the past month's stories in the world of music with T4 presenter, Miquita Oliver. This programme is no longer broadcast.
- The Official Box Upfront Chart – Presented by Jon Jackson and with data compiled by Radio Monitor, The Official Box Upfront Chart plays the 10 biggest pre-release tracks.
- Orange unsignedAct – First aired last year as MobileAct Unsigned on T4, Orange UnsignedAct follows the search for Britain's next biggest unsigned band. No longer being made.
- Six Steps – Linking a couple of artists, through six stages. Snoop Dogg to Girls Aloud, Dizzee Rascal to Westlife and Madonna to McFly are a few examples.
- This Week's Fresh Music Top 20 – A countdown of the 20 freshest music videos at the moment.
- Today's 4Music Top 10 – A chart compiled by 4Music of the "biggest" and "best" videos right now. The first ever Today's 4Music Top 10 Chart was broadcast on 18 August 2008 at 12:00 pm. Yeasayer were top with their single "Ambling Alp".
- Trending Live! – Live from Monday to Thursday from 4pm 'til 5:30pm (5pm until 1 May 2018) with Jimmy Hill, AJ Odudu and Vick Hope, Trending Live was the viewer's daily dose of new music and entertainment news centred on interaction with the audience on Twitter via the hashtag #TrendingLive and @TrendingLive & @4music accounts, and through Facebook comments. As of 18 April 2017 until 1 May 2018, Trending Live let viewers choose the music videos played in the You Select! segment from 5pm until the end of the show.
- Tweet To Beat – Usually shown when Trending Live is off-air, but also for Box Plus competitions like Last Fan Standing. Two artists songs are played alternately, viewers can use the hashtags on-screen to choose their winner (e.g. #4MusicCalvin vs. #4MusicTaylor, or #BeyhiveBoxLFS vs. #SwiftiesBoxLFS for Last Fan Standing), the percentages are shown on-screen throughout and when the vote closes the winner then gets the last song of the programme.
- UKHot40 – UKHot40 is a music video chart based on UK sales only, and documents the top records of the week.
- The UK Airplay Top 20 – The 20 most played songs on commercial radio this week. Now on Box Hits
- The Versus Chart – The programme is hosted by Matt Littler and Darren Jeffries. They both back an artist and show 10 mixed music videos of both artists with them to see which is "better". Eminem Vs. Kanye West, Britney Vs. Christina, Lady Gaga Vs. Katy Perry and Take That Vs. Robbie Williams are a few examples. Replaced by Showdown: ... vs ....
- Vote4Music – An interactive show where a set of 30 songs could be chosen by tweeting the relevant hashtag, the hashtag with the most votes was then played next and this process was repeated. The song that was chosen when the final song of the show is being played was then played at the beginning of the next show instead. Replaced by Showdown: ... vs ....
- What's Hot Right Now? Top 10 – The 10 best singles at this current point in time.
- Your Official Top 20 – A chart is compiled of songs from a particular artist that has released at least 20 singles such as Beyoncé, Christina Aguilera and The Black Eyed Peas. The public vote for their favourite song on the 4Music website and the results are shown on the results show.
- The Pop Power List
- The Big Five-0! Kiss FM's Jez Welham 50 biggest countdown songs this week. Now on Kiss TV

==== Award ceremonies ====
- Grammy Awards (2013–20)
- Teen Choice Awards (2015–19)
- Billboard Music Awards (2016)

==== Concerts and festivals ====
- AJ Tracey: Live and Direct (2020)
- V Festival (2008–11)

4Music has coverage at both festivals during the Summer, with highlights repeated frequently throughout the Summer. The channel also has stages at both events. At T4 on the Beach since 2007 (renamed the "T4 and 4Music Stage" in 2010) and at the V Festival since 2005 (then known as the "Channel 4 Stage", renamed to the "4Music Stage" in 2008).

T4 on the Beach ended after T4 ended its final run on 29 December 2012.

== Former logos ==
4Music logo 2012 to 2018
