= The Box (British and Irish TV channel) =

British television channel (1992–2024)

- Final logo, used from 2013 to 2024
- Country: United Kingdom

Ownership
- Owner: Channel Four Television Corporation
- Sister channels: Channel 4; 4seven; E4; E4 Extra; Film4; More4; 4Music; Kerrang!; Kiss; Magic

History
- Launched: 25 April 1992; 34 years ago
- Closed: 30 June 2024; 2 years ago

The Box was a television channel in the United Kingdom and Ireland, owned and operated by Channel Four Television Corporation. It primarily broadcast music videos and music-related programmes.

On 29 January 2024, Channel 4 announced in a press release that they would close The Box and its sister channels, which occurred on 30 June 2024.

== History ==
=== Launch and early years ===
The Box was brought to the United Kingdom by Vincent Monsey and his partner Liz Laskowski, who discovered the original American music video channel in Miami in 1991, when it was then known as The Jukebox Network. The UK company, Video Jukebox Network International Limited, was formed in 1991 and The Box was launched the following year in April 1992. The Box was initially carried by four operators UA, Telewest in London and Bristol, Nynex in the south of England, and Videotron, which was also based in London, and over the next few years, The Box started to launch on a regional basis across all of the United Kingdom's cable system and eventually onto Sky Digital in 1998. The Box was also broadcast on the Astra Satellite between 2:00 am and 6:00 am during the downtime of Granada Plus and Men & Motors. From 1999, all the regional versions of The Box were shut down and replaced with a single UK version.

Ticketmaster Inc. briefly owned 50% of the company (Box Television Ltd) before becoming a public company on the FTSE. EMAP took ownership of these shares in 1997, and purchased the shareholding held by the US company VJN Inc, which had then become TCI Music and then Liberty Digital. The US version of the channel was sold to MTV Networks in 2000, and was rebranded as MTV2 sometime afterwards, with EMAP retaining ownership.

=== Channel 4 acquisition ===
In July 2007, Channel Four Television Corporation acquired 50% of Box Television, before EMAP's remaining 50% in the company was sold to Bauer Media Group in January 2008. In 2019, Channel 4 took full ownership of the company, now known as The Box Plus Network.

On 2 April 2013, all Box Television channels went free-to-air on satellite, except for 4Music which went free-to-view. As a result, the channels were removed from the Sky EPG in Ireland. The Box was added to the Freesat EPG on 15 April 2013, alongside three other Box Television channels. The Box and its sister channels (except 4Music) returned to Freesat on 8 December 2021 alongside C4 HD.

Each year on 1 November, the channel temporary rebranded as "BoXmas", playing Christmas hits. It also played regular hits during post-Christmas days.

On the evening of 25 September 2021, transmission of channels operated by Channel 4 was impacted by the activation of a fire suppressant system at the premises of Red Bee Media. This resulted in The Box being simulcast on Freeview in the place of 4Music, and the channel being broadcast in the place of 4Music, Kerrang! TV and Magic on satellite and cable.

=== Closure ===
On 29 January 2024, Channel 4 announced it would be shutting down several of its smaller and declining channels which no longer delivered revenue and public value, including The Box. The channel's schedule for June 2024 hinted at a closure date of 30 June, as it featured several video blocks referring to the channel in the past tense, including a reuse of the channel's original logo and slogan, with its original slogan slightly alted to "Music Television You Controlled".

At 23:59 on 30 June 2024, The Box closed, with its final music video being "Goodbye" by the Spice Girls. It then played the shutdown promo before cutting to a screen saying "This service has now closed", as with its sister channels.

== Format ==
The logo used for BoXmas, a Christmas-themed temporary rebrand of The Box.

The Box received profits made from music video selections, which were made by the viewers using premium rate phone lines, as well as the small fees from BSkyB for being an encrypted channel. Each week, a new playlist would be released and would generally contain new or current music videos. In its earlier years, the playlist was published on teletext and the channel's website. In later years, The Box operated from a pre-programmed playlist and did not include video selection jukeboxes.

The channel was well known for its "First Play" feature, where many videos often made their UK or world premiere. This new music was often shown through the "Box Fresh" show. Most notably, The Box was recognized for the particular force behind the huge success of Spice Girls' 1996 hit "Wannabe", playing their first single months before its official release date.

Notably, from late 1991 to early 2000, there was a trend of artists certifying their names on The Box in their music videos, though the practice was not widespread. In most cases, this was simply an insertion of the logo at some point in the regular video, however in a few cases, the channel was actually certified their names by the artists themselves. The most notable example of this is the video for the S Club 7 song "S Club Party", which also had an extended opening and closing never seen on other music channels.

== Programming ==
From June 1, 2024, until June 30, 2024, The Box's programming reflected on its history as it prepared to close down.

- Hot Hits & New Vids (formerly known as Chart Hits & New Vids) – A music video block featuring current hits.
- Hotmix – A block featuring songs from recent years. The songs were usually cut down and edited to flow smoothly into the next track.
- UK Hotlist Top 20 & Top 40 – A block featuring the top 20 and 40 most streamed tracks on Spotify in the last week, hosted by Will Best.
- The UK Music Video Chart – Data supplied by YouTube, the block featured the top 30 most watched music videos of the week.
- Hitlist – Current hits.
- VOTW – A weekly block showing The Box's "Video of the Week".
- The Fresh List – New and recurrent videos from new and established artists.
- The Big Monthly Round Up - A monthly newsmagazine programme hosted by Lucy Jones.
- Saturday Night Feels – A Saturday night block.

== Logo history ==
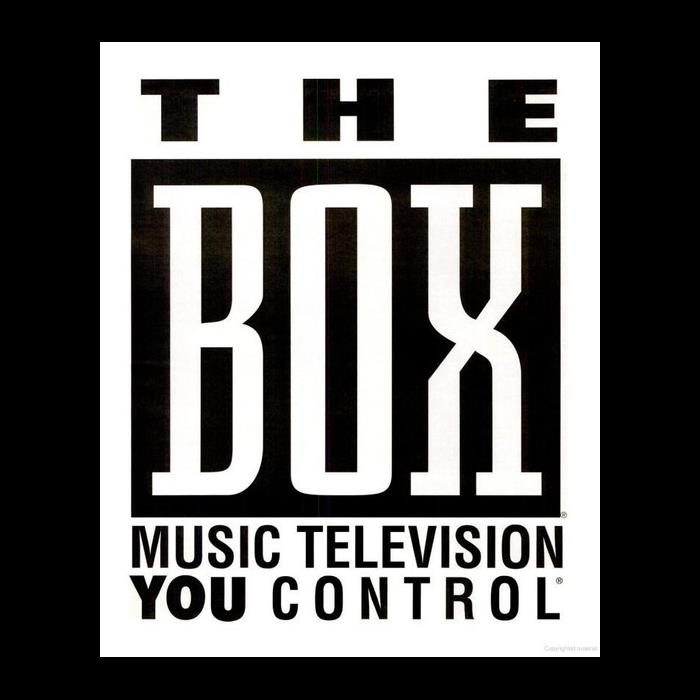
Primary logo, mirroring the US channel. This logo was reused from between August and September 2019, and in June 2024.

Secondary logo, used until 2013.

Tertiary logo, used from 2013 until 1 June 2024, with the screen bug changing 6 June 2024.
