= Freesat =

British free-to-air satellite television service

- Type: Joint venture
- Industry: Satellite television
- Founded: 16 May 2007; 19 years ago
- Headquarters: United Kingdom
- Products: Direct broadcast satellite, pay television, pay-per-view
- Owner: Everyone TV
- Website: freesat.co.uk

Freesat is a British free-to-air satellite television service, first formed as a joint venture between the BBC and ITV plc and since 2021 owned by Everyone TV (itself a venture of the four UK public service broadcasters, BBC, ITV, Channel 4 and Channel 5). The service was formed as a memorandum in 2007 and has been marketed since 6 May 2008. Freesat offers a satellite alternative to the Freeview service on digital terrestrial television, with a broadly similar selection of channels available without subscription for users purchasing a receiver.

The service also makes use of the additional capacity available on satellite broadcasting to offer a selection of 60 (as of December 2023) high-definition channels from broadcasters including BBC, ITV, Channel 4, Channel 5, Sky Mix, Arirang TV, Bloomberg, Daystar, Discovery Networks, France 24, NHK, and TRT World.

== History ==
=== Background ===
The BBC and ITV, the two biggest free-to-air broadcasters in the UK, make their services available digitally through three routes: free-to-air via digital terrestrial and digital satellite, and subscription-only via digital cable.

On digital terrestrial, the channels have always been available free-to-air with the appropriate equipment. In 2007 Freeview was available to only 73% of the population. After analogue TV services were replaced in the digital switchover, this increased to 98.5% for the public service channels and 90% for the full 'Freeview' service. To provide more widespread coverage and a larger number of channels, a digital satellite alternative was felt necessary.

Initially, both the BBC's and ITV's channels were encrypted since the original Astra satellites used for Sky broadcast to most of Europe but the broadcasters' rights for premium content such as films and sports typically covered the UK only. The use of encryption meant that anyone wishing to view the channels had to purchase equipment from Sky and pay for a free-to-view viewing card to decrypt the channels. Similarly, to use the Videoguard encryption, the broadcasters needed to pay a fee to NDS Group.

=== Move to free-to-air ===
In May 2003, the BBC moved most of its channels from the Astra 2A satellite to Astra 2D, which has a footprint that focuses more tightly on the UK. This move allowed the BBC to stop encrypting its broadcasts while continuing to meet its rights obligations. It dropped the encryption two months later. Two months later, ITV, whose channels had already been located on the Astra 2D satellite since launching on the Sky platform some years earlier, also made their channels free-to-air.

On 18 November 2008, Channel 5 commenced broadcasting a single channel via Freesat, eventually adding its ancillary services 5USA and 5* (now known as 5STAR) three years later in December 2011. It later added Channel 5 HD to Freesat following the removal of BBC Three (BBC iii) as an SD and HD TV channel (when it moved to online and BBC iPlayer only).

Viva moved from free-to-view to free-to-air on satellite on 19 March 2013 before launching on Freesat on 2 April 2013. On 2 April 2013, all seven of Box Television's channels left Sky's subscription package, with six becoming free-to-air on satellite; on 15 April four of the channels – The Box, Kerrang! TV, Kiss TV and Smash Hits – were added to the Freesat EPG. This was followed by Heat and Magic on 29 April.

The free-to-air channels can be received using any standard satellite (DVB-S) receiver, although those not licensed by Freesat will need to be re-tuned manually if/when channel frequencies are changed. (See next section.)

=== Managed service ===
The Freesat project aims to provide a managed service with an Electronic Programme Guide and interactive features similar to the Freeview service launched three years earlier. Unlike Freeview, however, these features are only available on approved receivers manufactured under licence from Freesat.

The initial plan was to launch the service in early 2006. This was postponed to Autumn 2007 as approval from the BBC Trust was only received in April 2007. However, the service was further delayed and was officially launched on 6 May 2008.

=== Launch channels ===
The service launched officially on 6 May 2008. From the launch, Freesat advertised all national television channels from the BBC and ITV as being available on the platform (excluding ITV2 +1), as well as all national BBC radio networks. Channel 4 also managed to make most of its channels free-to-air in preparation for the launch. In addition some channels from other broadcasters such as Chello Zone, CSC Media Group, Al Jazeera English, Zee Live, Zee News, RIA Novosti and Euronews were included on the channel list.

=== High-definition ===
BBC HD was the only high-definition channel available on Freesat from launch day, with ITV HD added as a "red-button" interactive service from 7 June 2008. On 2 April 2010 ITV HD changed from an interactive service to a full-time channel called ITV1 HD, simulcasting the main ITV1 channel. The name was changed back to ITV HD on 14 January 2013.

BBC One HD, a high-definition simulcast of BBC One, was made available on Freesat and other platforms on 3 November 2010. Channel 4 HD also became available on the platform on 19 April 2011 but was withdrawn on 22 February 2018. NHK World HD was added to Freesat on 9 May 2011; it shared its channel number with its standard definition counterpart and was therefore only listed on high-definition receivers, which were unable to access the standard definition channel via the EPG. (The SD channel ceased transmission on 1 October 2011.) On 23 July 2012, the BBC added 24 temporary channels to cover the 2012 Summer Olympics; the channels share their EPG slot with their standard definition counterpart. On 29 August 2012, Channel 4 added three temporary channels covering the 2012 Summer Paralympics in high definition from the following day; the three channels also share their EPG slots. On 14 February 2013, RT HD was added to Freesat, sharing its channel number with its standard definition simulcast.

On 26 March 2013, BBC HD was replaced by a high-definition simulcast of BBC Two. On 13 June 2013, an HD stream of the BBC Red Button was temporarily made available on the EPG. On 16 July 2013, the BBC announced they would be launching five new HD channels in early 2014. The five channels (HD simulcasts of BBC Three, BBC Four, CBBC, CBeebies and BBC News) were in fact launched early – on 10 December 2013. BBC Three and BBC Three HD have been rebranded as BBC iii and are now only available on the BBC iPlayer, but in HD, if your television is HD-ready and can be connected to the internet either directly (using an Ethernet cable) or via wi-fi or via your computer online. You now have to pay a licence fee to receive all BBC TV channels legally on all devices.

Channel 4 pulled its 4HD service from Freesat on 22 February 2018, along with its catch-up on-demand All4 service. It claimed that Freesat had significantly increased Channel 4's fee for the Freesat platform, with Freesat claiming that they had not increased their fee for the All4 catch-up service. However, Channel 4 HD returned to Freesat on 8 December 2021. Channel 5 HD and S4C HD continue to broadcast on Freesat, along with all the Channel 4 SD (standard definition) channels including Channel 4 SD, Film 4, E4, 4Seven and the +1 channels.

In April 2022, QVC launched its HD service on Freesat, followed by ITV2 HD, ITV3 HD and ITV4 HD in November 2022, and in February 2023, BBC completed its upgrade to HD of BBC Parliament, BBC Red Button and BBC Alba, and all its regional services (removing access to regional services for SD-only receivers). On 9 January 2024, BBC closed all SD channels broadcasting by satellite, and on the following day, ITV closed the SD channels, ITV3, ITV4 and ITVBe, with the SD versions of ITV1 and ITV2 later closing in October 2024. The +1 versions of ITV1, ITV2, ITV3 and ITV4 continued on SD-only receivers until November 2024, when they moved to a DVB-S2 transponder.

=== Regional variations ===
Some channels (notably BBC One and ITV) are transmitted in regional variations and the appropriate services are selected by the Freesat receiver from the user's postcode. In March 2010, ITV altered several of their regions from free-to-air transmission to free-to-view (because they were moved to a satellite from which transmission covers a much larger area than just the UK and content licensing means that they had to be encrypted). As a result, a few Freesat viewers (who cannot receive free-to-view, encrypted content) were moved to regional variations not corresponding to their actual location. Other available regions may be chosen by putting a different postcode into the box for the preferred television region. BBC English Regional content was previously only available in SD, whereas Wales, Scotland, and Northern Ireland programmes had also been available in HD on BBC One only. As of March 2023, all BBC services, including English regions, are available in HD with regional services now unavailable in SD. The SD “Nightlight” services for viewers with non-HD equipment has closed on 8 January 2024.

=== Recent launches ===
On 24 November 2020, the BBC Sounds app was added to Freesat 4K boxes to provide streaming access to live and catch-up BBC radio and podcast services.

On 30 November 2020, Court TV joined the Freesat EPG as channel 177, 12 weeks after first launching on satellite for the UK.

On 17 September 2020, Sky Arts Launched on Freesat channel 147 as a result of the channel itself going free-to-air, offering 24 hours a day of programmes dedicated to highbrow arts, including theatrical performances, movies, documentaries and music (such as opera performances and classical and jazz sessions).

On 16 December 2020, Amazon Prime Video joined the range of apps available on Freesat 4K boxes.

On 13 June 2021, GB News launched in HD on channel 216.

On 11 October 2021, That's TV Gold launched on Freesat channel 178, broadcasting classic TV entertainment, music and films from the 1960s to today, 24 hours per day.

On 8 December 2021, the high-definition version of Channel 4 re-joined the Freesat lineup (it had left in February 2018) and Channel 4's music channels, Box Hits, The Box, Kiss, Magic and Kerrang!, also started broadcasting again on the platform.

On 8 November 2022, Freesat added ITV2 HD, ITV3 HD and ITV4 HD, followed by ITVBe HD on 12 December 2023. The HD channels replaced the SD channels on their previous channel numbers.

== Video on demand ==
The BBC began to roll out a beta version of BBC iPlayer for Freesat devices in early 2010. BBC iPlayer is an internet-based service with around 2500 hours of television being available on demand. ITVX is available for Humax increased to a 30-day catch-up service from the original 7-day service but with a larger ITV ident/logo in the top left of the screen, Manhattan, and some Sagemcom devices, however it is not available on 2nd Generation Humax devices to viewers using DG and TD postcodes. It is not clear why this is the case.

In 2010, Freesat also indicated an intent to launch a receiver featuring the YouView service (then called 'Project Canvas') and said that the video on-demand services 4oD (now All 4) and Demand 5 were under consideration

On 28 July 2011, the BBC Trust approved proposals to introduce the listing of pay content delivered on-demand via broadband. The trust will allow the BBC to continue to play a part in Freesat as the plans did not represent a significant change to the approval previously given in 2007. There was no need for a Public Value Test or for further regulatory process. Under the plans, some pay content, such as films, would be added to the Freesat EPG alongside the existing free-to-air content. However, there would be no adult material or live-streamed sports coverage. Freesat itself will not supply any of the on-demand content but will allow third parties to do so through its EPG. Some content will also be made available through existing channels using an on-screen prompt that would take viewers to an on-demand environment. Pay-TV sales would be handled by a third party, with Freesat operating the conditional access system that would underpin it. The plan is to use the upcoming launch of G2 spec receivers to add support for Digital Rights Management and, where technically possible, on existing receivers.

On 29 November 2011, a beta trial for the subscription-based on demand movie service BoxOffice365 was added to the Freesat EPG. On 11 March 2013, BoxOffice365 withdrew from Freesat.

The Freetime guide also features a backwards EPG and a Showcase section offering recommendations. HTML versions of BBC iPlayer and ITV Hub will also launch, both services use MHEG-5 on first generation devices. YouTube launched on Freetime receivers on 7 March 2013, the first deployment of YouTube's HTML app in a Western European TV service. 4oD launched on Freesat's Freetime receivers on 27 June 2013, making Freesat the first UK TV platform to host the HTML5 version of 4oD. Demand 5 arrived on Freesat on 6 August 2013.

In December 2015, Freesat announced the availability of an application for the Netflix subscription TV streaming service on the Humax HDR-1000S, HDR-1010S, HDR-1100S and HB-1000S Freetime receivers. Netflix is expected to be available on other Freetime receivers in the future.

In January 2016, Saorview, the Irish free TV service, announced it would be launching an online catch-up and on-demand TV service using the commercial version of the Freetime software, including EPG roll-back and remote recording, with Freesat providing a fully managed service.

In September 2016, the BBC closed the MHEG version of the BBC iPlayer (V2) used on some older connected TVs and receivers (manufactured between 2008 and 2014). Freesat Freetime equipment using the HbbTV version was unaffected. The BBC recommended that consumers should purchase replacement receivers to continue to receive iPlayer.

In October 2016, STV Player was made available to Freesat viewers. The online live streaming and catch-up service operated by STV shows ITV programmes and content from its own archive.

All4 (formerly 4OD) was added to the [Humax] Freesat service soon after its launch online; however, due to fee increases at the start of 2018, Channel 4 have withdrawn the All4 on-demand service from all boxes that carry the Freesat Freetime service, from 22 February 2018 as well as taking Channel 4HD from all HD-capable Freesat devices.

In September 2018, catch-up service UKTV Play joined the Freesat on-demand services, offering catch-up programming from UKTV's channels, including Dave, Yesterday, Really and Drama.

In March 2019, Channel 5's Demand 5 app provided catch-up for Channel 5, 5 STAR, 5 USA, 5 SELECT, 5 Spike and Paramount Network was replaced on Freesat by My5, with a change in the user interface, a selection of programmes from partner channels, BLAZE, BET, PBS America, Real Stories, Spark and Together, and some programmes shown online exclusively or ahead of broadcast.

== Reception equipment ==
=== Receivers ===
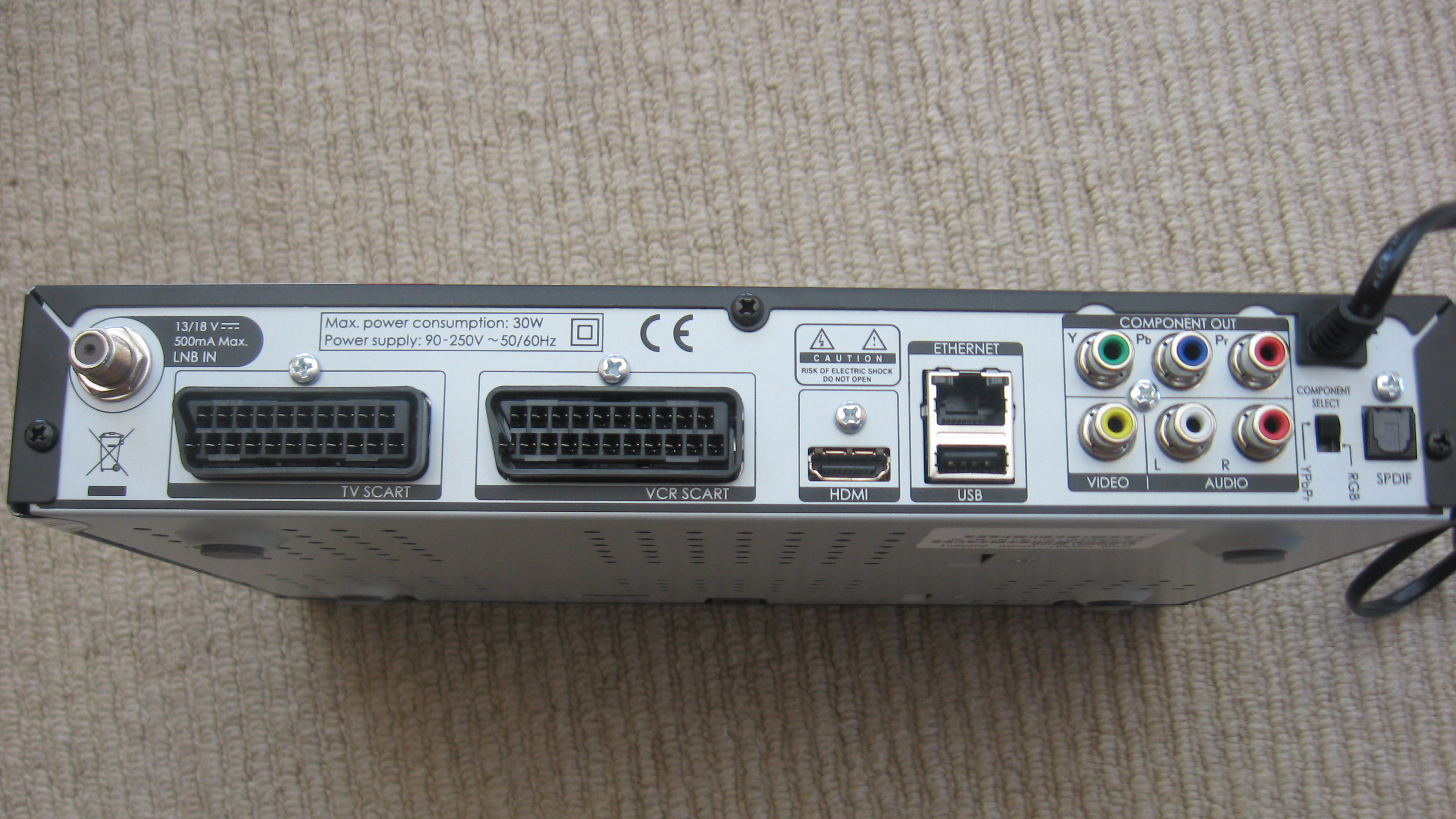
Reverse of a Humax Freesat HD box

At the launch of the service, there were two types of Freesat receivers available —standard definition-only receivers and high definition-capable receivers. The first set-top boxes were made by Bush, Goodmans and Grundig (the Alba Group) and also by Humax. As of July 2010, there were eleven companies licensed to produce Freesat boxes and televisions. Humax launched a Freesat recorder, Freesat+, which became available to the public in November 2008.

On 17 October 2012, Humax released the first Freetime receiver, the Humax HDR-1000S.

In September 2018, Freesat announced that Arris International would produce Freesat's 3rd generation set-top box. The new boxes, which support 4K, were eventually released in February 2020 by CommScope, who purchased Arris International in 2019.

=== Televisions ===
Following the initial launch, Panasonic introduced three plasma televisions with integrated HD Freesat receivers. At the end of October 2008, Panasonic brought out two more sizes which are 32" and 37".

In April 2009, LG launched four LCD TVs with built-in Freesat receivers. The LG series is the LG LF7700 (discontinued mid-2010), with screen sizes of 32", 37", 42" and 47". Sony has released two televisions with Freesat receivers, the W5810 and Z5800 series, available from sizes 32" up to 52" and in 100 Hz and 200 Hz alternatives.

=== Satellite dish ===
The service makes use of the same group of Astra satellites at 28.2°E as the Sky subscription satellite service. This means that a satellite dish which is positioned to receive these services will be capable of receiving Freesat, with the addition of a suitable receiver (or Television with the receiver built-in). Provided that the LNB has sufficient outputs, a single dish may be used to receive multiple services (i.e. Sky and Freesat). However, a dish with an LNB for the Sky Q service cannot be used with most types of Freesat receivers because Sky Q uses a wideband LNB which is incompatible with most models of Freesat receiver. A "Hybrid" Sky Q LNB can be used as it has both wideband outputs for Sky Q and conventional universal LNB outputs for non-Sky Q receivers, including Freesat. In 2020 a new generation of Freesat boxes was launched, these work with regular LNBs and also Sky Q LNBs.

For users who do not currently have a satellite dish, Freesat offers an installation service which is made available through retailers and which is advertised in a leaflet included with Freesat receivers. A suitable dish may also be installed by the user or a non-Freesat-affiliated installer.

=== Ireland ===
While Freesat systems work in Ireland, official branded Freesat receivers are not widely or officially marketed in the country. On 23 October 2008, several Irish retail chains, including Maplin, Tesco Ireland and PowerCity began offering modified Freesat systems from Grundig and Alba that had their Freesat branding replaced with a Sat4free brand name. The requirement to enter a UK postcode was removed; the systems were instead set to use the version of the electronic programme guide appropriate for Northern Ireland through a hard-coded Belfast postcode. Sat4free was permanently closed down shortly after.

In Ireland there is now an alternate FTA satellite service, Saorsat which only carries the RTE channels.

=== Outside the UK and Ireland ===
Although not intended for reception outside of the UK, it is possible to receive Freesat outside of the UK and Ireland but a larger dish is required as the UK beams of Astra 2E, Astra 2F and Astra 2G (which carry the majority of channels from the BBC, ITV, Channel 4 and Channel 5) have footprints tightly focused on the UK and Ireland. Also, Freesat receivers are not widely or easily available outside the UK, without which the full Freesat EPG is not accessible.

== Technical details ==
Freesat broadcasts are from the same fleet of satellites (Astra 28.2°E) as Sky UK's Pay-TV service. Channels are broadcast using DVB-S, or DVB-S2 for HD channels. Freesat's role is not broadcasting or availability of channels (although the BBC and ITV are substantial broadcasters in their own right) but instead providing a platform for receiving the channels and the EPG.

All of the standard definition channels on Freesat are broadcast using DVB-S; ITV HD and NHK World HD also use DVB-S. BBC One HD and BBC HD used DVB-S until 6 June 2011 when the satellite transponder carrying them was upgraded to DVB-S2. Channel 4 HD had launched using DVB-S2 but the transponder was downgraded to DVB-S on 28 March 2012. Standard definition channels are broadcast using MPEG-2, while high definition channels are broadcast using MPEG-4. Interactive television is done using MHEG-5 rather than the proprietary OpenTV platform used by Sky. Channel 4 is no longer available in HD since 22 March 2018; it is again available here only in SD, just like it was before 19 April 2011. The BBC suspended SD broadcasts on satellite in January 2024.

Since the channels are broadcast 'in the clear', they can also be received by non-Freesat receivers, including Sky Digiboxes, although these devices cannot receive HD channels on DVB-S2 transponders.

The specification for Freesat boxes includes having an Ethernet port. This is to allow on-demand programming from services such as BBC iPlayer or ITV Hub to be viewed directly on the customer's television.

Open standards and technologies form the basis of Freesat's second-generation Freetime receivers, including those from the Open IPTV Forum (OIPF), the Hybrid Broadcast Broadband TV (HbbTV) project and HTML5 browser technology, with the majority of the Freetime user interface built using the latter.

The Freetime spec also includes features such as: DiSEqC 1.2 support; MoCA (Multimedia over Coax Alliance) support including single cable routing; HTML, JavaScript and CSS internet technologies for broadband-delivered interactive services; DRM for online content; and payment mechanisms for broadband services like LoveFilm. James Strickland, Freesat's director of product and technology development, explained that Freetime is a hybrid between HbbTV and MHEG-5.

== Adoption ==
The table below shows the quarterly and cumulative sales of Freesat equipment in the first years of the service.

Quarter	Quarterly Sales	Cumulative Sales	Quarterly HD Sales	Cumulative HD Sales	Quarterly HD Proportion	Reference
Q2, 2008	39,018	39,018	23,854	23,854	61%	
Q3, 2008	68,982	108,000	49,146	73,000	71%	
Q4, 2008	125,000	233,000	99,000	172,000	79%	
Q1, 2009	117,000	350,000	91,000	263,000	78%	
Q2, 2009	98,000	450,000	77,000	340,000	79%	
Q3, 2009	190,000	640,000	?	?	79%	
Q4, 2009	260,000	900,000	?	?	80%	
Q1, 2010	100,000	1,000,000	?	?	80%	
Q2, 2010	250,000	1,250,000	?	?	80%	
Q3, 2010*	?	?	?	?	80%	
Q4, 2010*	?	?	?	?	80%	

In the Q4 2009 report (from the table above), Ofcom reported that Freesat had announced the 1 million mark had been hit by the end of February 2010.

*Note: Ofcom stopped reporting Freesat Penetration Cumulatively with the Q3 2010 Report, and stopped quarterly reports at the end of 2010. Indications are that Freesat penetration largely plateaued in late 2010.

In May 2017, Freesat announced that 904,000 devices capable of receiving the platform were sold in 2016, with the installed base increasing 58,000-year-on-year and passing 2 million during the course of the year.

== See also ==
- Astra 2E, Astra 2F, Astra 2G – satellites carrying Freesat (with channel lists)
- Freesat from Sky
- Freeview - terrestrial service complementary to Freesat, both now managed by Everyone TV
- Murphy v Media Protection Services Limited
- Saorsat – a free-to-air satellite service for Ireland
- Tivùsat - a free-to-air satellite service for Italy
