= Channel Four Television Corporation =

British media company headquartered in London

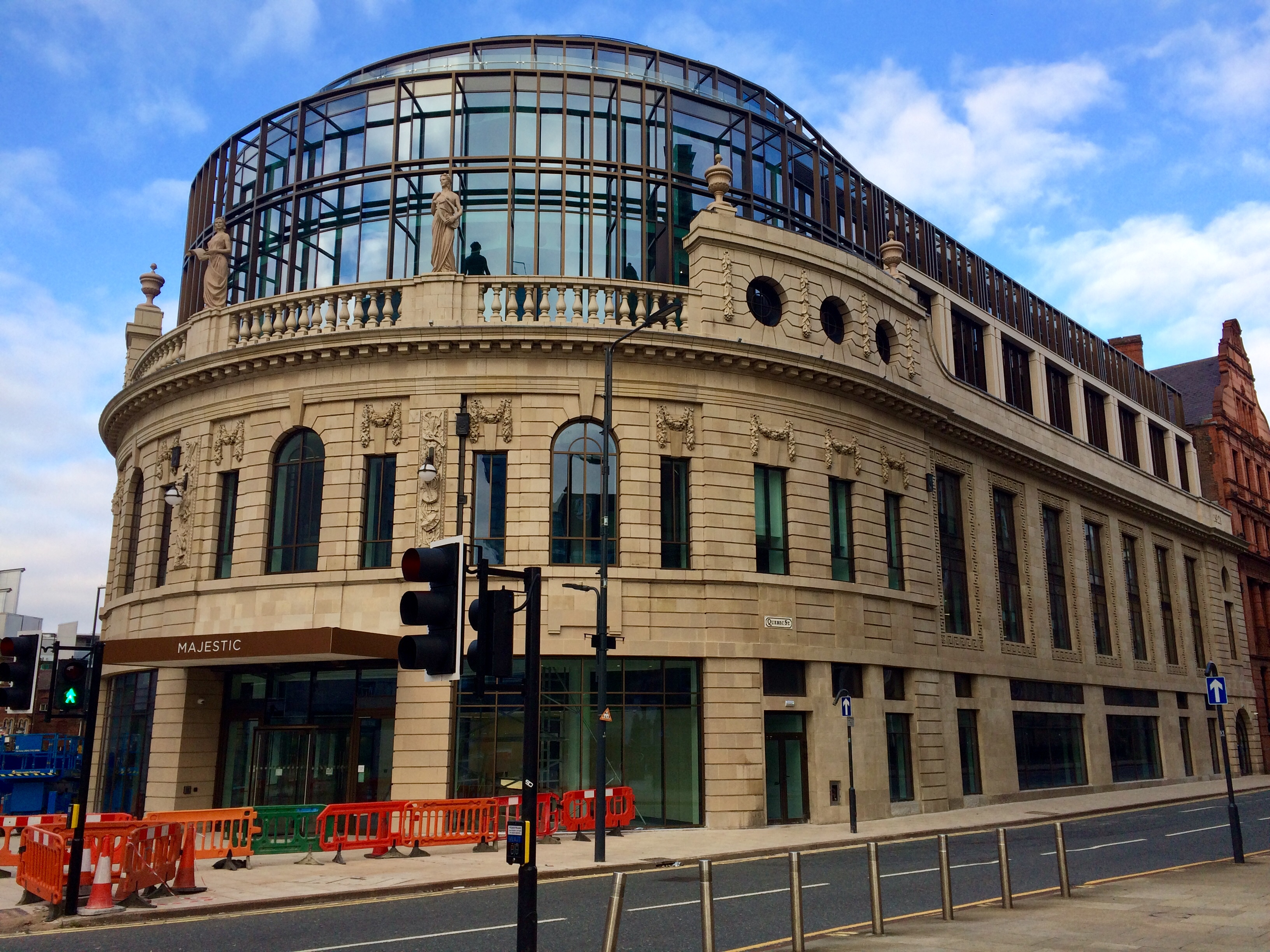
- Channel Four national headquarters, Majestic, Leeds
- Formerly: Channel Four Television Company Limited (1980–1993)
- Type: Statutory corporation
- Industry: Mass media
- Founded: 1 December 1980; 45 years ago
- Headquarters: Majestic; Leeds, England, UK
- Area served: United Kingdom; Isle of Man; Guernsey; Jersey; Ireland
- Key people: Geoff Cooper (Chairman)
- Revenue: ▼£1,040 million (2024); £985 million (2019)
- Operating income: ▲£74 million (2020); −£26 million (2019)
- Net income: ▲£69 million (2020); −£25 million (2019)
- Total assets: ▲£943 million (2020); £805 million (2019)
- Total equity: ▲£452 million (2020); £385 million (2019)
- Owner: UK Government Investments
- Number of employees: 992 (2020)
- Parent: Department for Culture, Media and Sport
- Website: www.channel4.com

Channel Four Television Corporation is a state-owned public service broadcaster and media company in the UK. It owns and operates six television channels, a television streaming service, and Film4 Productions, its film development and financing unit.

Its six television channels are Channel 4, E4, E4 Extra, More4, Film4 and 4seven.

Unlike the BBC, the UK's other state-owned broadcaster, Channel Four Television Corporation receives no public funding and is instead funded entirely by its own commercial activities - primarily advertising.

The company was founded in 1980 as the Channel Four Television Company Limited, a wholly owned subsidiary of the IBA, and became an independent statutory corporation in 1993.

In November 1998, the company significantly expanded its remit, of providing the 'fourth television service', with the launch of Film4, its film unit.

The company has, since then, been involved in a range of other activities, all in some way associated with the main channel, and mainly using the '4' brand.

The company also owned The Box Plus Network, a music-focused company with a network of six music television channels. They were folded into the corporation in 2019.

== History ==
Towards the end of the 1980s, the government began a radical process of re-organisation of the commercial broadcasting industry, which was written onto the statute books by means of the Broadcasting Act 1990. Significantly, this meant the abolition of the IBA, and hence the Channel Four Television Company. The result led to the creation of a corporation to own and operate the channel, which would have greater autonomy and would eventually go on to establish its other operations. The new corporation, which became operational in 1993, was the Channel Four Television Corporation, and was created to replace the former broadcasting operations of the Channel Four Television Company. It remained publicly-owned and was regulated by the new Independent Television Commission (ITC), created under the same act. The ITC and its duties were later replaced by Ofcom, which like its predecessor is responsible for appointing the corporation's board, in agreement with the Secretary of State for Culture, Media and Sport.

In terms of the station's remit and other duties, the creation of the corporation meant little change; the new corporation would have to manage its own advertising, rather than this being carried out on its behalf by the local ITV contractors (see Funding).

In March 2010, Channel Four Television Corporation and its chief executive were criticised by the Culture, Media and Sport Select Committee for breaking service commitments, a lack of transparency in accounting for digital channels, poor governance and failed investments.

Channel Four Television Corporation was considered for privatisation by the governments of Margaret Thatcher, John Major and Tony Blair. In 2014, the Cameron-Clegg coalition government drew up proposals to privatise the corporation but the sale was blocked by the Liberal Democrat Business Secretary Vince Cable. In 2016, the future of the channel was again being looked into by the government, with analysts suggesting several options for the channel's future.

In 2021, the new national headquarters was opened at the Majestic, Leeds. The previous headquarters at 124 Horseferry Road became the corporation's London headquarters.

In June 2021, the government of Boris Johnson was considering selling the channel. In April 2022, the Department for Digital, Culture, Media and Sport acknowledged that ministerial discussions were taking place regarding the sale of Channel Four Television Corporation. The channel's chief executive, Alex Mahon, expressed disappointment at this, saying that its vision for the future was "rooted in continued public ownership". However, the Government subsequently announced in January 2023 that the planned sale of the channel had been cancelled.

In April 2025, the company announced its chief executive Alex Mahon, who has held the position since October 2017, will step down in the summer of 2025. Jonathan Allan, the chief operating officer, will serve as interim chief executive while her replacement is hired.

== Operations ==
=== Television services ===
Channel 4 digital channels viewing figures 1998–2008

==== Channel 4 ====
Channel 4 is a national public-service television channel in the United Kingdom which began transmission on 2 November 1982. The channel was established to provide a fourth national television service in addition to the two BBC services funded from the television licence, and the single commercial broadcasting network, ITV.

Channel 4 is commercially self-funded. On the conversion of the Wenvoe transmitter in Wales to digital on 31 March 2010, Channel 4 gained UK-wide coverage. The channel is known for broadcasting a variety of programmes aimed at the public's interest. Its aim is to "champion unheard voices, take bold risks and stand up for diversity." The broadcaster's main news bulletin, Channel 4 News, is broadcast every day and has a permanent 7pm slot on weekdays.

==== Film4 ====
Channel Four launched a subscription film channel, FilmFour, on 1 November 1998. It was available on digital satellite television and digital cable. Companion services, such as FilmFour+1, FilmFour World and FilmFour Extreme were also available on some digital services. In 2003 Extreme and World were discontinued, and replaced with FilmFour Weekly. FilmFour Weekly closed in July 2006, when the main, newly named Film4 channel went free-to-view and became available on digital terrestrial. The switchover to digital terrestrial was heavily advertised. The adverts featured Lucy Liu, Christian Slater, Ewan McGregor, Judi Dench, Gael García Bernal, Willem Dafoe, Mackenzie Crook, Rhys Ifans, and Ray Winstone declaring "Film4 is now free" in various situations across London.

When Channel 4 had the rights to broadcast Test cricket in England, the downtime of the FilmFour channel was often used to broadcast uninterrupted coverage of a match when the main channel was committed elsewhere, usually to racing. At these times FilmFour was available unencrypted and free-to-air.

==== E4 ====
E4, a digital entertainment channel previously available on the Internet, with a target age range of 16–34, was launched on 18 January 2001. It features premières of US imports and supplementary footage for programmes on its main channel (most notably extended Big Brother coverage).

In 2005 the channel launched on digital terrestrial. E4 is widely available in Ireland, in close to 70% of homes, being carried on the Virgin Media Ireland cable network and also on Sky.

==== More4 ====
More4 is a channel aimed at those aged 35–60. Launched on 10 October 2005, it carries news and nightly discussion programmes, such as More4 News, an extension of Channel 4 News that attempts to look "beyond the headlines", giving in-depth analysis.

==== 4seven ====
Channel Four launched 4seven on 4 July 2012. The channel offers audiences the chance to catch-up on the top-rated programming from Channel Four's boutique of channels over the past week. The channel is available on Freesat, Freeview, Sky, and Virgin Media.

==== E4 Extra ====
Launched on 29 June 2022, E4 Extra is a Channel 4-branded channel, showing entertainment programmes.

==== Timeshifted channels ====
Channel Four runs timeshift variants of its services (except 4Music and 4seven) on all digital platforms. In 2007, Channel 4 was the first terrestrial broadcaster in the United Kingdom to offer a time-shift variant of its main channel. In common with many other broadcasters, these channels output exactly the same programmes and continuity as was broadcast an hour previously, and are titled with the station name followed by a "+1" suffix.

=== Internet services ===
==== Channel4.com ====
The channel4.com website offers detailed programme information, highlights, and interviews with actors and presenters of all Channel Four channels.

==== 4mations ====
In January 2008, Channel Four joined with Aardman Animations and Lupus Films to create 4mations, a user-generated content animation portal, similar to Aniboom or MyToons.

==== Channel 4 (video on demand service) ====
Channel 4 operates a video on demand service. Launched on 16 November 2006 as 4oD, the service offers a variety of programmes recently shown on Channel 4, E4, More4 or from their archives. However, some programmes and films are not available, due to rights issues. The service was renamed All 4 in March 2015. On 17 April 2023, All 4 rebranded as Channel 4, becoming the "first UK broadcaster to adopt one brand identity across its digital and linear channels".

=== 4Ventures ===
In 2001, 4Ventures was created as the parent body of Channel 4's commercial activities, rather than public-service obligations, with the intent of making profits which would serve to subsidise the main Channel 4.

Following the sale of Quiz Call (a gaming channel operated by the then-owned subsidiary Ostrich Media) in 2006, a restructure of 4Ventures saw many of its activities re-integrated back into the main channel's operations (including day-to-day running of E4, Film4 and More4).

=== 4Rights ===
4Rights was formed from an amalgamation of Channel 4 International and Channel 4 Consumer Products. As part of the restructure, much of the 4Ventures management team either left the company—former chief executive (and Channel 4 commercial director) Rob Woodward, and managing director Anmar Kawash took similar posts at STV Group plc—‚or transferred to other posts within Channel 4.

In 2007, the UK-based independent distribution group Digital Rights Group (DRG) announced an intention to buy Channel 4 International (adding it to Zeal and ID Distribution among its other companies), following a review by Channel 4 of its commercial division. The deal was completed in November of the same year. The Consumer Products division (Including Channel 4 DVD) was retained by Channel 4 as part of a new, restructured, 4Rights division.

== Subsidiaries ==
=== Film production ===
Channel Four has had a long record of success in funding the production of films through Channel Four Films, renamed FilmFour in 1998 to coincide with the launch of its digital channel of the same name. Notable successes include The Madness of King George, The Crying Game, Four Weddings and a Funeral and Trainspotting.

== Former operations ==
=== Television services ===
==== At the Races ====
In 2000, Channel Four launched a dedicated horse racing channel, At the Races, in conjunction with British Sky Broadcasting and Arena Leisure plc, owner of 28 of Britain's racecourses. The channel ceased broadcasting in March 2004 owing to financial problems, but was subsequently restructured and re-launched (without Channel 4's involvement) in June 2004, and it is branded with almost identical livery as Sky Sports. Channel 4's racing coverage, renamed to incorporate "At the Races" in the title, returned to its original name of Channel 4 Racing when the channel left involvement with At the Races. Channel 4 racing programmes now feature close co-operation with rival digital racing channel Racing UK, who sub-licence the live rights and share the same production company. Channel 4 cross-promote Racing UK's coverage of the day's racing during its broadcasts.

==== The Box Plus Network ====
In July 2007, Channel Four bought 50% of Box Television Ltd for £28 million from Emap plc. Emap's stake was transferred to new owners, Bauer Consumer Media, following Bauer's acquisition of Emap's publishing and radio businesses. In 2015, Box Television was renamed The Box Plus Network with a new look and logo.

On 29 January 2024, as part of a range of cuts announced by Channel Four Television Corporation, it was announced that all channels in The Box Plus Network would be closed down by the end of the year. The five music TV channels operated by The Box Plus Network were The Box, 4Music, Kiss, Magic and Kerrang!. All five channels closed at 23:59 on 30 June 2024.

=== Radio ===
==== 4 Digital Group ====
Channel Four was the leading member of the 4 Digital Group consortium, which included Bauer Radio, BSkyB and UTV as partners. In July 2007 the group was awarded a 12-year licence to operate the second national DAB radio multiplex after having defeated its only rival, National Grid Wireless, in the three-month bidding process.

The service would have operated ten radio stations, including Channel 4 Radio, E4 Radio, Sky News Radio, and Radio Disney (in association with Disney). Some of the services, especially Channel 4 Radio and E4 Radio, would have competed directly with national BBC Radio stations. Podcast and text services were also to have been provided. In October 2008, Channel 4 announced that it was abandoning its plans for digital radio stations.

==== 4radio ====
In 2006 and 2007, the 4radio brand was used for podcasts delivered by Channel 4 Radio. A small amount of 4radio-branded content was heard on Oneword until its closure in January 2008.

==== Oneword ====
Oneword was a digital radio station featuring the spoken word, launched in 2000 by UBC. In early 2005 Channel Four purchased a minority stake, and later that year paid £1 million to increase its stake to 51%. On 4 January 2007 it was announced that Channel Four had sold its shares back to UBC for £1. The station ceased broadcasting on 11 January 2008.

=== Teletext services ===
==== 4-Tel/FourText ====
Channel Four originally licensed an ancillary teletext service to provide schedules, programme information and features. The original service was called 4-Tel and was provided in collaboration with Oracle. In 1993, with Oracle losing its franchise to Teletext Ltd, the running of 4-Tel was taken over by Intelfax, and in 2002 was renamed FourText.

==== Teletext on 4 ====
In 2003, Channel 4 awarded Teletext Ltd a ten-year contract to run the channel's ancillary teletext service, named Teletext on 4. The service closed in 2008, and Teletext is no longer available on Channel 4, ITV and Channel 5.

== Logos ==
1982-1996

1996-1999

1999-2004

2004-2015

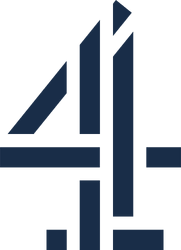
2015-2023

2022-present

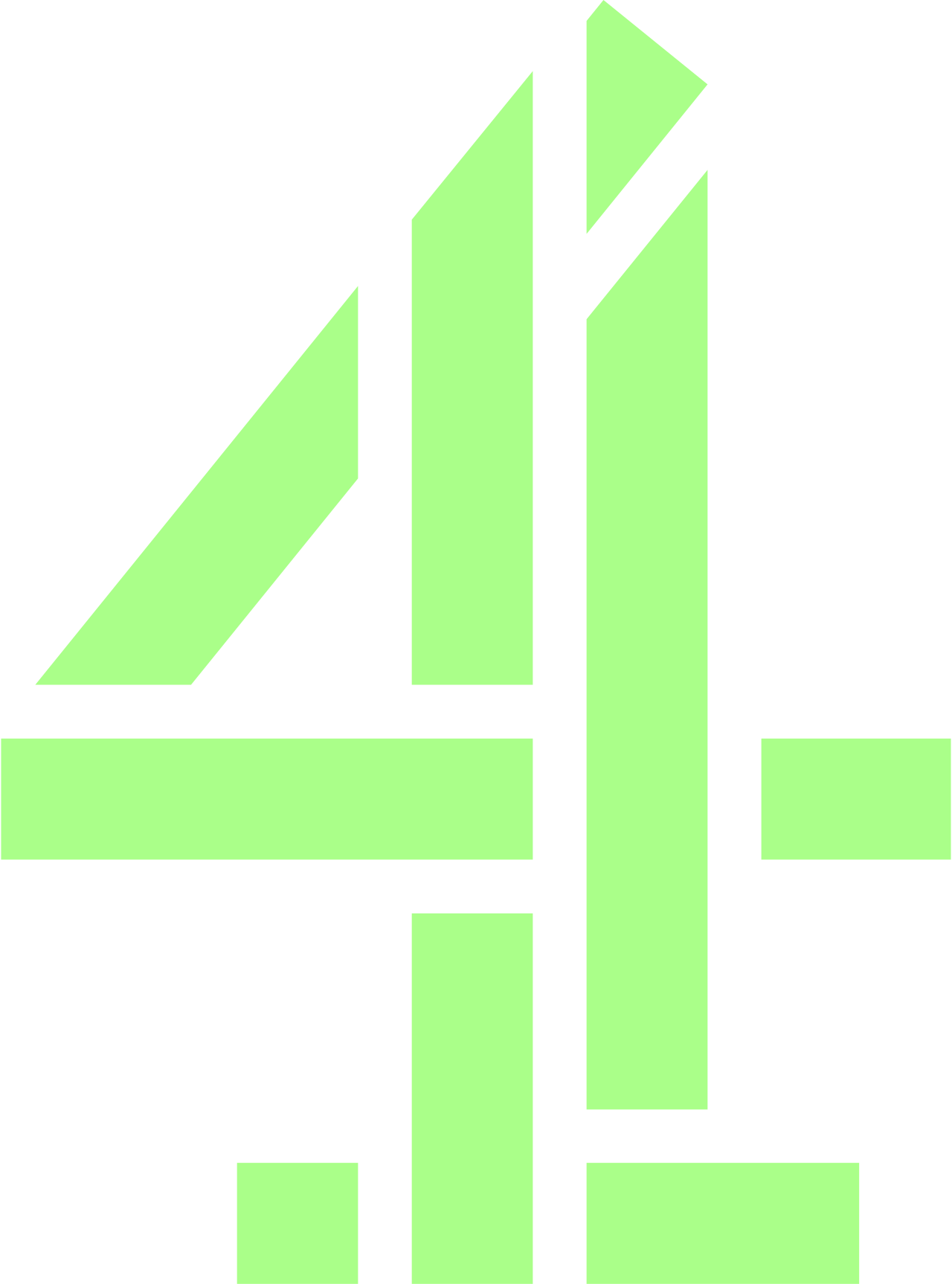
2023-present

== Corporate affairs ==
=== Senior management ===
Channel Four is overseen by a chairman and run on an operational basis by a chief executive, whose role can be compared to that of the Director-General of the BBC. The chief executive is appointed by the chairman, which is a part-time position appointed by Ofcom.

==== Chairmen ====
- Edmund Dell (1982–1987)
- Richard Attenborough (1987–1992)
- Michael Bishop (1993–1997)
- Vanni Treves (1998–2003)
- Luke Johnson (2004–2010)
- Terry Burns (2010–2016)
- Charles Gurassa (2016–2022)
- Dawn Airey (interim) (January–April 2022)
- Ian Cheshire (2022–present)

==== Deputy chairmen ====
- Richard Attenborough (1982–1987)
- David Puttnam
- Chris Holmes, Baron Holmes of Richmond

==== Chief executives ====
- Jeremy Isaacs (1981–1987)
- Michael Grade (1988–1997)
- Michael Jackson (1997–2002)
- Mark Thompson (March 2002 – June 2004)
- Andy Duncan (July 2004 – November 2009)
- Anne Bulford (interim) (November 2009 – January 2010)
- David Abraham (January 2010 – October or November 2017)
- Alex Mahon (October or November 2017–)

=== Headquarters ===
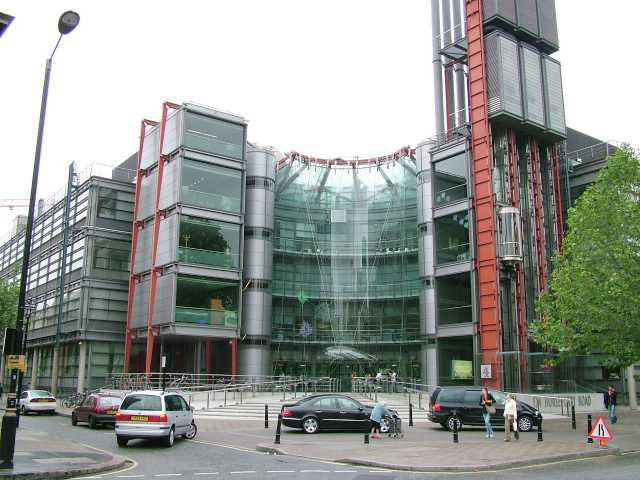
The Channel 4 building, 124 Horseferry Road

Channel Four was originally based at 60 Charlotte Street in the West End of London. Since 1994 the company has occupied distinctive, purpose-built headquarters at 124 Horseferry Road, Westminster. Designed by the Richard Rogers Partnership with structural engineering by Ove Arup & Partners, the architecture of the 15,000 square metre building follows on from – but is more restrained than – the Lloyd's building in the City of London. It was constructed between 1990 and 1994. Twin four-storey office blocks arranged in an L shape are connected by a curved front with a dramatic concave glazed wall.

Despite nearly all Channel 4 programmes being commissioned from independent production companies, the Channel 4 headquarters originally contained a studio and post-production facility, marketed as 124 Facilities. The studio was used for Channel 4 programmes (such as T4 continuity), and other channels' programmes such as Channel 5's football coverage. The studio was closed at the end of October 2007 and only the post-production operation remains, managed by Ericsson Broadcast and Media Services.

In October 2018, Channel 4 announced that it would open a new national headquarters in Leeds, to operate alongside the existing headquarters in London. In September 2021, 200 staff moved into several floors of the Majestic, a former cinema in Leeds city centre which had been renovated by Rushbond.

In January 2024, Channel 4 announced they would sell 124 Horseferry Road, as part of cost-cutting measures.

==== Big 4 ====
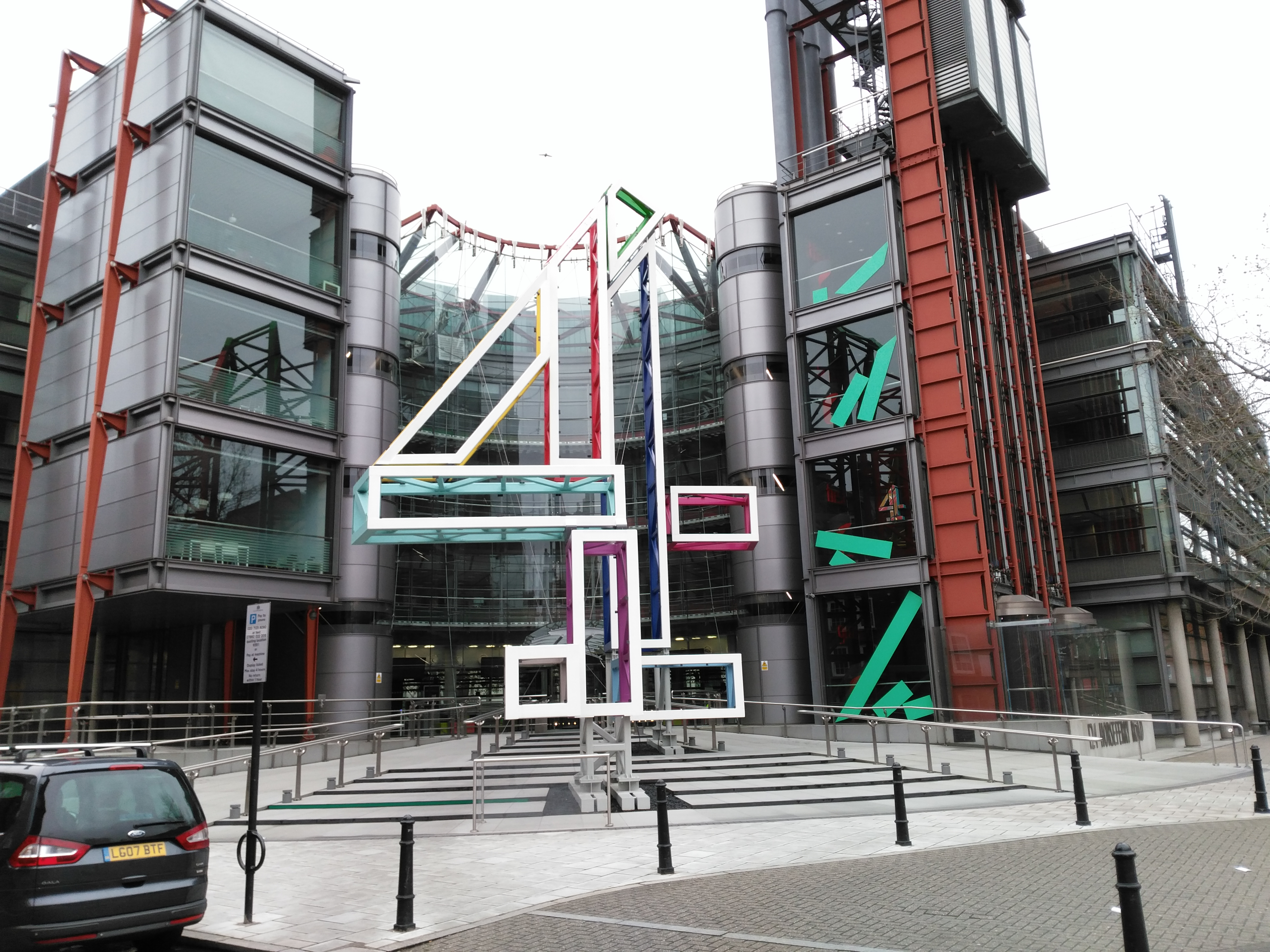
The Big 4 sculpture outside the Channel 4 building in London in January 2016

The Big 4 is a 50-foot-tall statue of the Channel 4 logo which was constructed outside the building. The Big 4 is designed by FreeState The structure replicates the channel's 2004–2015 idents, in which the "4" logo is formed only when viewed from a particular angle. Since its construction in 2007 the Big 4 has been adapted into art installations by artists such as Stephanie Imbeau, photographer Nick Knight, fashion designer Hannah Gourlay, and disabled artist Tony Heaton.
