= 4seven =

British free-to-air television channel

- Logo used since 2018
- Country: United Kingdom

Programming
- Language: English
- Picture format: 1080i HDTV (downscaled to 16:9 576i for the SDTV feed)

Ownership
- Owner: Channel Four Television Corporation
- Sister channels: Channel 4; E4; E4 Extra; Film4; More4

History
- Launched: 4 July 2012; 14 years ago
- Replaced: More4 +2

Links
- Website: channel4.com/now/4s

Availability

Terrestrial
- Freeview: Channel 49

Streaming media
- Channel 4: Watch live
- Virgin TV Go: Watch live (UK only)

4seven (commonly stylised as 4_{7}) is a British free-to-air television channel owned by Channel Four Television Corporation. According to Channel 4, it was created in response to its viewers demanding Channel 4 to broadcast old programming from the network. Its programming focuses on Channel 4's top rated programmes.

4seven launched on 4 July, 2012 with 20 hours of content in the schedule per day. In the 8:00 pm and 10:00 pm slots the channel broadcasts a repeat of shows from the previous day that have created a critical buzz in newspapers, chatter on social media through Twitter and Facebook and reaction on the overnight log of comments kept by the broadcaster. The 11:00 pm slot is used to repeat the programme shown on Channel 4 at 9:00 pm, which airs again on 4seven at 9:00 pm the following day. The rest of the programmes on 4seven are repeats of the most popular ones of the last several days. Weekends are devoted to multiple repeats of the best-rated and/or highest viewed programmes of the past seven days on Channel 4.

== History ==
The service was originally reported under the working title of 'Project Shuffle', though it was announced on 8 March 2012, that the name would be '4seven'. The channel was originally set to launch by June 2012, however it was subsequently reported to be launching later in the summer. On 22 May 2012, it was confirmed that 4seven would launch on 4 July 2012.

The channel launched across all major TV platforms in the UK, with agreements in place for carriage on Freeview, Freesat, Sky, and Virgin TV. The channel indirectly replaced the temporary More4 +2 on Sky. While on Freeview, a placeholder for 4seven appeared on channel 47 in post-digital switchover areas on 2nd of April 2012.

A high-definition simulcast, 4seven HD, launched on the 1st of July 2014 on Freeview, channel 111. 4seven HD was added to Virgin Media in November 2016. It closed on 22 June 2020 on Freeview to help make room on COM7 following the closure of COM8. 4seven HD is currently exclusive to Virgin Media, Sky Glass, and the Channel 4 app (for TVs).

On 4 November 2020, the channel moved to channel 48 on Freeview as part of a move up where every channel from channel 24 to 54 on the platform moved up one place to allow BBC Four to move to channel 24 in Scotland due to new Ofcom rules regarding certain PSB channels requiring greater prominence on EPGs. This is because the BBC Scotland channel is on channel 9 in Scotland, whilst BBC4 is on channel 9 in the rest of the UK.

On 18 June 2025, the channel increased its coverage availability on Freeview by making the move from the COM5 multiplex to the PSB2 multiplex.

== Former logos ==
4seven first logo used from 2012 to 2018
