= E4 Extra =

British TV channel

- Logo used since 2022
- Country: United Kingdom
- Broadcast area: United Kingdom and Ireland

Programming
- Picture format: 16:9 576i SDTV

Ownership
- Owner: Channel Four Television Corporation
- Sister channels: Channel 4; 4seven; E4; Film4; More4

History
- Launched: 29 June 2022; 4 years ago
- Replaced: 4Music (first version)

Links
- Website: www.channel4.com/collection/e4

Availability

Terrestrial
- See separate section

E4 Extra is a British free-to-air television channel owned and operated by Channel Four Television Corporation. Launched on 29 June 2022, it is a sibling channel to E4 and replaced 4Music, with the latter in turn replacing Box Hits which has shut down. Unlike Channel 4's other services, E4 Extra is not available for live streaming on Channel 4's streaming service.

E4 Extra shows comedy and entertainment programming, along with repeats of some Channel 4 programmes. It had broadcast music programming in the mornings until April 2023. Unlike the rest of the Channel 4 networks, it does not regularly broadcast films. As of 2026 the schedule comprises predominantly reality programming prior to 8pm and principally comedy and entertainment programming thereafter.

Idents for the new channel have been directed by Michael Marczewski, where various everyday events develop unexpectedly, such as 'most dangerous interdimensional monster' being entered alongside a village fete's massive vegetable competition.

On 27 September 2022, E4 Extra moved from 139 to 138 on Sky, following the transition of Channel 4 HD from a single nationwide service on 138 to a fully regionalised version at channel 104 (108 in Wales, where S4C occupies 104). 139 was subsequently used by Sky Sci-Fi.

E4 Extra broadcasts from 7:05am to around 3am every day. However, the off air caption mentions it returns at 7am.

== Availability ==
=== Cable ===
- Virgin Media (UK): Channel 144

=== Satellite ===
- Freesat (UK): Channel 126
- Sky (UK) and Sky (Ireland): Channel 138

=== Terrestrial ===
- Freeview (UK): Channel 31

== Programming ==
=== Comedy and drama (including Adult Swim) ===
- Baby Daddy
- Batwoman
- The Big Bang Theory (2022–2025)
- Big Boys
- Black-ish
- Black Books
- Brooklyn Nine-Nine
- Catastrophe
- Charmed
- Dead Pixels
- Derry Girls
- Father Ted
- Fresh Off the Boat
- Friday Night Dinner
- The Goldbergs
- Green Wing
- How I Met Your Mother
- The Inbetweeners
- The IT Crowd
- Killing It
- Malcolm in the Middle
- Man Down
- Mixed-ish
- My Adventures with Superman (2022–2025)
- Melissa & Joey
- The Neighborhood
- Peep Show
- Rick and Morty
- Sabrina the Teenage Witch
- Scrubs
- Smiling Friends (2022–2025)
- Stath Lets Flats
- Young & Hungry
- Young Sheldon (2022–2025)

=== Reality, factual and entertainment ===
- 8 Out of 10 Cats
- 8 Out of 10 Cats Does Countdown
- Alone
- America's Funniest Home Videos
- Below Deck Down Under
- Below Deck Mediterranean
- The Big Fat Quiz of Everything
- Couples Come Dine with Me
- Dance Moms
- Don't Tell the Bride (UK and Irish versions)
- The Great British Bake Off
- Hotel Hell
- I Literally Just Told You
- Impractical Jokers
- Kitchen Nightmares (US and Australia versions)
- Legendary
- Married at First Sight (UK version)
- Ninja Warrior (UK reversion, previously on Challenge)
- Rude Tube
- Russell Howard & Mum (previously on Comedy Central)
- So Dumb It's Criminal
- Storage Wars
- Taskmaster (UK and NZ versions)
- Tattoo Fixers
- Travel Man
- Undercover Boss (US, Canadian and Australian versions)
- Wife Swap (US version)
- Wipeout (US version)
