= More4 =

British free-to-air television channel

- Logo used since 2018
- Country: United Kingdom

Programming
- Picture format: 1080i HDTV (downscaled to 16:9 576i for the SDTV feed)
- Timeshift service: More4 +1; More4 +2 (closed, replaced by 4seven)

Ownership
- Owner: Channel Four Television Corporation
- Sister channels: Channel 4; 4seven; E4; E4 Extra; Film4

History
- Launched: 10 October 2005; 21 years ago

Links
- Website: channel4.com/now/m4

Availability

Terrestrial
- Freeview: Channel 18

Streaming media
- Channel 4: Watch live
- Sky Go: Watch live (UK and Ireland only)
- Virgin TV Anywhere: Watch live (UK only); Watch live (+1, UK only)
- UPC TV: Watch live

More4 is a British free-to-air television channel owned by Channel Four Television Corporation. Launched on 10 October 2005, it was conceived as a sister channel to Channel 4 aimed at an older audience than the youth-oriented E4. Its original schedule combined repeats of Channel 4 programmes with news and current-affairs programming, arts programmes and American drama series.

In January 2012, More4 was relaunched with a greater emphasis on lifestyle programming, accompanied by new branding and a move away from documentaries and arts programmes. The channel was rebranded again in 2018. More4 became free-to-air on satellite in 2008, and an HD version launched in 2013. It is also distributed outside the United Kingdom, including in Ireland.

== Content ==
The idea of a sister channel aimed at an older demographic than the youth oriented E4 with the More4 branding was first planned by Channel 4 back in 2003, although it in fact had grown out of an earlier idea which had been known as G4. Channel 4 had previously been planning a free-to-air youth channel before deciding on the More4 concept, as E4 was still a subscription channel at the time.

More4 eventually launched on 10 October 2005. Its initial lineup included More4 News, repeats of Channel 4 programmes such as Grand Designs, Countdown and Deal or No Deal and American drama series such as ER, The West Wing and The Sopranos, which had previously been seen on E4, alongside Channel 4. More4 also broadcast the American satire programme The Daily Show from its launch in 2005, and a late evening chat show, The Last Word.

Having shown all five weekday editions of The Daily Show since More4's launch, in January 2011 the channel scaled back its commitment to one episode per week in order to increase investment in its arts programming.

More4 broadcast a major season of programmes in 2007 celebrating the 25th anniversary of Channel 4, repeating the debut episodes of two of Channel 4's original programmes, Brookside and Countdown.

On 23 January 2012, More4 was relaunched, shifting towards a more lifestyle-based schedule. Documentaries which previously aired on the channel moved to Channel 4.

== Branding ==
=== 2005–2012 ===
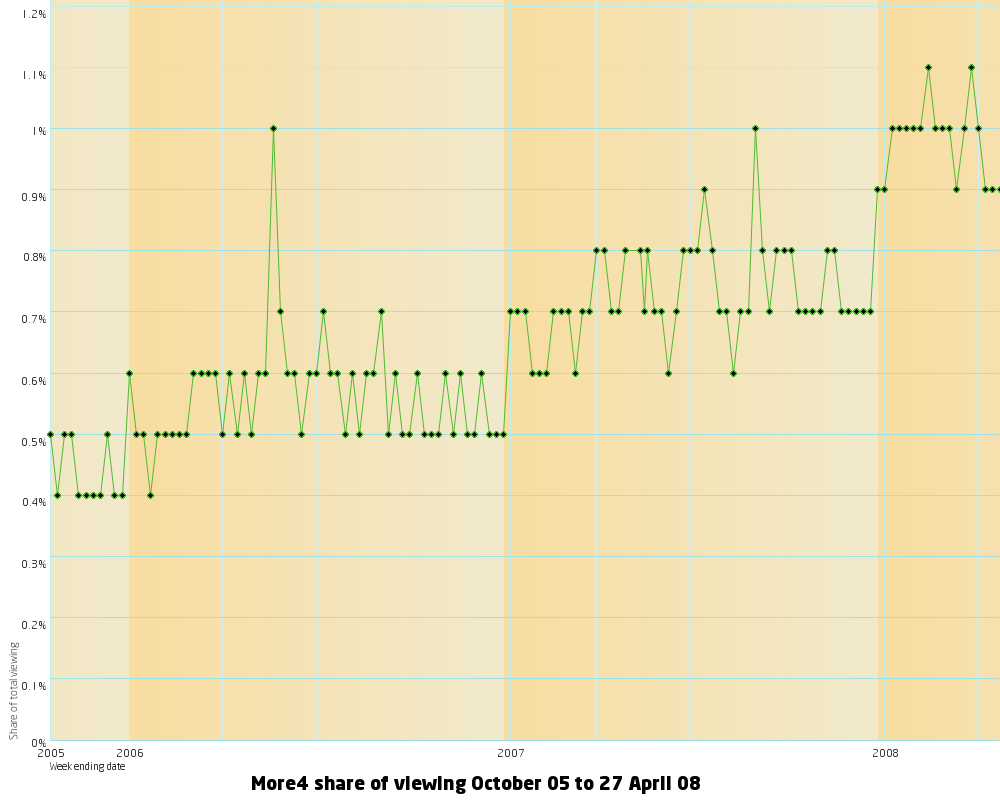
More4 share of viewing 2005–2007 BARB figures

In September 2005, Channel 4 began running teaser trailers for the new station (although the name was neither mentioned nor seen in the adverts). Showing neon lettering, the teasers hinted at "adult entertainment". Some people may have been confused by the deliberate double-meaning of these trailers and mistakenly presumed the new channel would be of a pornographic nature. Advertisements starting at the end of September made it much clearer that the "adult entertainment" being offered was the 'intelligent and insightful' programming. Viewing figures for the launch date gave More4 an average figure of 269,000 viewers, compared to E4's 296,000. The original More4 branding was designed by Spin and animated by DBLG.

=== 2012–present ===
On 23 January 2012, More4 adopted a new logo and on-air branding. The logo and channel idents were designed by London-based design and motion company ManvsMachine and Channel 4's in-house agency, 4Creative. The repositioning of the brand coincided with the channel's move towards more lifestyle content and a move away from documentaries and arts. The idents focus on moving mechanical "scrapbooks" which also refers to the Digital Scrapbook platform.

A new logo and branding was introduced on 27 September 2018, which included a version of the original stylised numeral "4" logo, as designed by Martin Lambie-Nairn and Colin Robinson, with the word "More" imposed on top of it. The branding was not a major overhaul, as the other idents stayed the same but revised. This was part of the Channel 4 major rebranding across all their channels. In November 2022, on the 40th anniversary of the original "4" logo being shown on British TV screens, Channel Four Television Corporation announced that all their channels would be rebranded to align with the Channel 4 brand.

== Availability ==
Space was reserved on Freeview multiplex C for the channel. However, despite Channel 4 saying that the channel would appear on multiplex C, the channel appeared on multiplex 2. A placeholder appeared on the Freeview EPG at number 13 on 13 September and, after a time, ran a looping teaser trailer. More4 +1 became available on the DTT platform on 14 December 2005. It was removed on 18 May 2006, to make way for live coverage of Big Brother, and the Freeview launch of Film4 later in the year. More4 +1 relaunched on Freeview in January 2017 but was removed again on 30 June 2022 due to the closure of the COM7 multiplex.

While More4 is available on most cable platforms, More4 +1 was available on Virgin Media until 20 August 2007 when it was replaced by Channel 4 +1 across the digital television network. It was re-added on 15 January 2013 and in July 2023 the channel was moved to 347.

Despite initial advertising and official internet communication that it would be free-to-air on satellite television, More4 was encrypted under Sky's pay TV scheme until 6 May 2008 when it dropped its NDS encryption and went free-to-air. It joined the BBC and ITV's new satellite platform, Freesat on the same day.

More4 is available outside the UK where it is available to viewers in Ireland via Sky and Virgin Media Ireland's digital service. This led to further speculation that Channel 4 would eventually launch on Sky in Ireland, which it did in December 2006. Channel 4 has already made its other flagship channels: E4, E4 +1, Film4 and Film4 +1 available in Ireland via Sky, Virgin Media Ireland digital TV providers. Channel 4 itself is available on almost all Irish cable and MMDS systems (in some cases, Channel 4 is replaced with S4C). In Switzerland, the channel is available among other Channel 4 branded channels on UPC Switzerland and on Swisscom TV. The channel is registered to broadcast within the European Union/EEA through the Luxembourg Broadcasting Regulator (ALIA).

More4 +2 launched on 16 April 2012 on Sky channel 269, in the lifestyle section of the guide. The temporary channel, which aired for a limited period between 7:45 pm and 11.00 pm, was short-lived, because it closed on 26 June 2012 ahead of the launch of 4seven on 4 July.

== HD feed ==
Channel 4 anticipated that More4 HD would launch in 2011, however a launch did not occur. As part of More4's rebrand in January 2012, ManvsMachine created the channel logo for More4 HD. On 14 September 2012, Channel 4 announced that More4 HD would launch on Sky. The channel then launched on 4 February 2013. More4 HD also became available to Virgin Media viewers on channel 203 on 1 October 2013. In January 2023, Virgin Media had moved More4 HD to 147 to make it free to viewers.

== Logos ==
2005–2012

2012–2018

== See also ==
- Channel 4
- E4
- Film4
