= The Box Plus Network =

British television company

The Box Plus Network Ltd
- Final logo, used from 2014 to 2019.
- Company type: Limited company
- Industry: Mass media
- Founded: 1992; 34 years ago
- Defunct: 30 July 2019; 6 years ago
- Fate: Integrated into Channel 4
- Headquarters: Horseferry Road, London, United Kingdom
- Area served: United Kingdom
- Services: Television, online
- Parent: Channel Four Television Corporation
- Website: www.boxplus.com

The Box Plus Network (formerly Video Jukebox Network International Ltd and Box Television Ltd) was a British television company owned by Channel Four Television Corporation, and specialising in music programming. Channel Four acquired a 50% share in Box Television (established 1992) in 2007, and gained full control in 2019. The five remaining channels closed on 30 June 2024.

== History ==
The Box began as a cable television service in 1992, showing music videos. It was taken over by the publishing company Emap in the late 1990s, and began to broadcast via satellite and Freeview alongside other music channels which used Emap-owned brands. Emap sold its broadcasting business to Bauer Media in 2007, and a 50:50 joint venture was established between Bauer and Channel Four.

On 2 April 2013, all The Box Plus Network channels went free-to-air on satellite, apart from 4Music which went free-to-view.

On 8 January 2019, Channel 4 acquired Bauer's 50% stake in the company to take full ownership of The Box Plus Network. In July of that year, operations of Box Plus moved into Channel 4's main business operations. The company was based in Victoria, London.

On 16 November 2023, the ability to stream the Box Plus Network's channels on their website and the 4Music player was removed.

On 29 January 2024, as part of a range of cuts announced by Channel Four Television Corporation, it was announced that all channels in The Box Plus Network would be closed down by the end of the year.

Channel 4's portfolio of music channels – The Box, Magic, Kiss, 4Music and Kerrang! closed on 30 June 2024.

== Final channels ==
Box Television logo used until 2013.

=== The Box ===
The Box was well known for its First Play feature, where many videos often made their UK or world première. This new music was often shown through the Box Fresh show on the channel.

=== Kiss ===
Kiss TV was a commercial music television channel from The Box Plus Network available on the Freesat, Sky and Virgin Media digital TV platforms. The playlist covered a wide range of rhythmic music including: urban, grime, electronic, dance, hip hop and R&B, although after its relaunch in Summer 2006, (and the launch of a sister channel Q) it began to focus more on dance music once again. It was based on format of the Kiss brand from Bauer which also exists in the Kiss Radio station.

=== Magic ===
Magic TV played mainly easy listening music videos from the 1980s to 2000s and sometimes 1970s as well. It was based on format of the Magic brand from Bauer which exists in the Magic Radio station and Magic branded CDs.

=== Kerrang! ===
Kerrang! specialised in Rock Music. As of 2005, all of its programme content was music videos, the majority of which were open scheduled, for text requests from their playlist. It is based on format of Kerrang! brand from Bauer which also exists in Kerrang Radio and Kerrang! magazine.

=== 4Music ===
4Music was the only Channel 4-branded channel within the Box Plus Network and showcases a range of pop centring on chart hits and current favourites, along with, until 2022, a range of comedy and reality TV programmes from Channel 4 and E4. The channel was formerly available free-to-air on the British digital terrestrial television service Freeview on channel 31. On June 29, 2022, the channel moved to the slot accompanied by Box Hits, while its current slot was used to launch E4 Extra. With this, the channel was fully transitioned back to an all-music schedule.

== Prior defunct channels ==
=== Box Africa ===
In July 2012, Box Television launched a 24-hour pan-African music channel. The channel focused on international and local music from across the African continent and was available in 15 countries of Africa. Box Television also made available its other major channels across Africa. The channel ceased broadcasting in late 2020.

=== Box Hits ===
Box Hits (formerly Smash Hits) broadcast general mainstream pop music from the past few years. Formerly called Smash Hits, it took its name and format of the Smash Hits brand from Bauer which existed in Smash Hits Radio and once ran as a magazine. It shut down on 29 June 2022, and was replaced with 4Music.

=== The Hits ===
The Hits closed on 15 August 2008. It was replaced by 4Music. Its sister radio station remained on the air until 4 June 2018.

=== Q ===
Q specialised in indie, rock and alternative. In common with other Box Television channels, Q was originally a jukebox channel, where music video selections made were by the viewers using premium rate phone lines; however this element was dropped in 2004. It is based on format of the Q brand from Bauer which exists in Q Magazine and Q Radio. Q closed on 3 July 2012, when it was replaced by Heat.

=== Box Upfront ===
Box Upfront (formerly Heat) was a fresh music channel which launched on 3 July 2012. It formerly took its name and format from Bauer's weekly Heat magazine, and broadcast showbiz news, celebrity features and music videos. It replaced Q on Sky, Smallworld Cable, UPC Ireland, Virgin Media and in Iceland on Síminn. The channel closed on 9 January 2020.

== Box Plus app ==
In 2017, The Box Plus Network launched the Box Plus app, available on Now TV, Roku, EETV, Amazon Fire TV, Xbox, iOS and Android devices. The app was free to use, and included the ability to stream Box Plus Network channels alongside a catch up service. By 2024, the app had been discontinued for some time.
