= BritBox =

Internet service showing British TV

- Logo used as of January 2026
- Company type: Subsidiaries (owned separately in the UK and internationally)
- Website type: OTT platform
- Available in: English
- Dissolved: 30 April 2024; 2 years ago (United Kingdom); 30 August 2024; 2 years ago (South Africa)
- No. of locations: 7
- Area served: Australia; Canada; Denmark; Finland; Norway; Sweden; United States
- Founders: ITV; BBC Studios
- Key people: Robert Schildhouse (CEO for BritBox International)
- Industry: Entertainment, Internet
- Products: Streaming media; Video on demand
- Services: Film production & distribution; Television production & distribution
- Parent: BritBox International: BBC Studios Global Media & Streaming (Note: Between 2019 and 2024, BritBox International was 50% owned by ITV); BritBox UK: ITV (Note: Between 2019 and 2022, BritBox UK was 10% owned by the BBC)
- Divisions: BritBox International (BBI); BBI North America; BritBox US; BritBox Canada; BBI International Markets; BritBox Australia; (all other markets); BritBox UK (ITVX)
- Website: www.britbox.com
- Registration: Monthly/yearly subscription required to access content
- Users: 2.6 million (July 2022)
- Launched: 7 March 2017; 9 years ago (United States)
- Current status: Active

BritBox is a British over-the-top video on demand streaming service owned by BBC Studios (Note: First launched in the US under BBC Studios, due to UK regulations, where BBC Studios operate all BritBox services outside the UK on behalf of the BBC as the BBC's commercial subsidiary. The UK service between 2019 and 2022, was partially owned by the BBC itself, although 90% of the joint venture was owned by ITV on founding, but in 2022 ITV became BritBox UK's sole owner.) which operates in seven countries across Australia, Europe, and North America. In addition to original programming, it offers British television series and films, featuring current and past series as well as films supplied by Britain's major terrestrial broadcasters the BBC and ITV (Channel 4 and Channel 5 programming was available on the UK service starting in 2020). BritBox is said to feature the biggest collection of British box sets available in one place, with additional original programming available from 2020.

BritBox was first launched in the United States on 7 March 2017, followed by a launch in Canada on 14 February 2018. A separately managed UK service was launched on 7 November 2019. From 2020, the service has since launched in Australia, South Africa, and in the Nordic countries of Denmark, Finland, Norway, and Sweden, through local partnerships in these four countries. The service in the UK and the international services are operated differently, and host differing content, including BritBox UK's exclusive original content. There are content restrictions between each platform, leading some content to be available on one platform and unavailable on another.

BritBox provides new episodes to British soaps and dramas such as EastEnders, Coronation Street and Emmerdale, within hours of their UK broadcast via BritBox's 'Now' feature to US and Canadian users, but also includes extensive archives of older programming, including Doctor Who classic series on the service. It reported a subscriber base of 250,000 within a year of launching in the US. In 2019, 650,000 subscribers were reported from the North American platform. In early 2020, the number of US and Canadian subscribers surpassed 1 million users, to around 1.2 million by August, and 1.5 million by October, following strong growth in the North American service due to the COVID-19 pandemic. On 9 March 2021, it was reported that the UK service had surpassed 500,000 subscribers, meeting BritBox's UK target. Will Harrison, BritBox UK's managing director told members of the UK Broadcasting Press Guild that BritBox was "very happy" at how the service had performed since its November 2019 launch. By 1 July 2022, it had reached 2.6 million.

== History ==
=== Failed "Project Kangaroo" ===
Though not officially described as its successor, BritBox has been likened to an earlier attempt by UK public service broadcasters (PSBs) (BBC Worldwide, ITV and Channel 4) to create an online video-on-demand download service, codenamed "Project Kangaroo", in November 2007. This followed the launches of the broadcasters' own video-on-demand services.

On Wednesday, 4 February 2009, Project Kangaroo was blocked by the Competition Commission.

The commission stated that the case surrounding Kangaroo was about the control of valuable UK-originated TV content. "BBC Worldwide, ITV and Channel 4 together control the vast majority of this material, which puts them in a very strong position as wholesalers of TV content to restrict competition from other current and future providers of video-on-demand services to UK viewers," said Peter Freeman, the chairman of the Competition Commission, in its final report on Project Kangaroo. "We thought viewers would benefit from better video-on-demand [VoD] services if the parties – possibly in conjunction with other new and/or already established providers of VoD – competed with each other."

A Channel 4 spokesperson said at the time, "This is a disproportionate remedy and a missed opportunity in the further development of British broadcasting."

After the planned Project Kangaroo was blocked, the system's assets were sold to transmitter firm Arqiva and this led to the development of the service SeeSaw, which operated from February 2010 to October 2011, with content from the BBC, ITV, Channel 4, and Channel 5, some of which (such as Doctor Who) now appears on BritBox.

=== Rise of streaming ===
Since the rise of Netflix and subsequent other Subscription Video on Demand services (SVODs), European PSBs and media companies, in particular, have started to find ways to compete with the increasing dominance of American SVODs, and many old rivalries have been put aside in preference of collaboration by creating jointly controlled SVODs, such as BritBox, Salto (backed by French networks TF1 Group, France Télévisions and M6), and Germany-based Joyn (a joint venture between ProSiebenSat.1 Media and Discovery, Inc.). Such actions are motivated by reports showing younger generations shunning terrestrial TV, and with fears that PSBs have no choice but to adapt in the rapidly changing television market.

=== Establishment of joint venture ===
Following increased competition from the streaming giants on the public service broadcasters, the BBC (through BBC Worldwide) and ITV announced plans to create a Netflix-style TV service. Talks between the BBC and ITV to launch this streaming service took place in March 2016, with NBCUniversal also initially in the talks.

BritBox's launch in the United States was officially announced in December 2016, with the launch date to be 7 March 2017. The BBC and ITV announced several shows they would be running on BritBox including New Blood, Tutankhamun, The Moonstone, In The Dark, Cold Feet and crime series Silent Witness on US launch. On 14 February 2018, BritBox launched in Canada.

In February 2019, it was announced that BritBox would be launched in the UK later in the year as a rival to Netflix. Journalist Mark Lawson likened the proposed project to BBC Worldwide's previous failed platform, Project Kangaroo, which was expected to launch in 2008, and described it as "bizarre" and "hugely risky". In March 2019, Channel 4 confirmed interest in collaborating with the BBC and ITV. McMafia, Last Tango in Halifax, Les Misérables and the sitcom Gavin & Stacey were some of the programmes available on the UK version, at launch.

In July 2019, the BBC and ITV announced they had signed an agreement to launch BritBox in the UK in the last quarter of 2019.

On 20 September 2019, ITV announced it had reached a deal with ViacomCBS (now Paramount Global) for Channel 5 and Comedy Central UK content. This was followed by an announcement on 27 September that Samsung TVs, Freeview Play and YouView would be the first distribution platforms.

In October 2019, BritBox launched its "testing phase" (beta) in the United Kingdom, to which users could sign up for a free trial to have a "snapshot of what will be there at launch".

On 15 October 2019, BBC Studios global distribution president, Paul Dempsey, admitted there were more markets where the UK-skewing service could work. Alongside the launch of BritBox in Australia, taking the service into its fourth market, BBC Studios and ITV have announced that they will continue to evaluate new opportunities for the roll-out of BritBox in additional territories around the world.

One day before UK launch, on 6 November 2019, The Guardian reported that Channel 4 was to join BritBox after it signed a 3-year deal to provide 1000+ hours of content from All 4 "with a range of comedy, drama and non-scripted programmes from across the service, including new series, and for the first time to any streamer, an exclusive Film4 curated service featuring iconic British films". This means for the first time, all the UK's traditional channels have brought together programmes on a single streaming service. Channel 4 content would be available on BritBox from April 2020 and Film4 content from September 2020, with recently aired content being only available on BritBox 31 days after the airing of the last episode on Channel 4. Channel 4 currently has not taken an equity stake in BritBox.

In March 2020, ITV described BritBox as "on plan" following its UK launch last November. The majority owner in the BBC-ITV streaming venture reported a "strong growth" in subscribers, but didn't report any specific numbers.

On 5 March 2020, the BBC and ITV announced the launch of BritBox in Australia. The service would bring Australians "an unrivalled collection of great British TV shows, and will build on the successful launch and operation of the service in both North America (the USA and Canada) and most recently in the UK". British content from across the past decades, including classic and contemporary box sets from the UK, would be directly available to Australian viewers via a wide range of mobile and connected home devices. BritBox Australia will be run as a 50/50 joint venture partnership between ITV and BBC Studios, and ITV says, the service will draw on the experience of the teams and technology used to successfully launch BritBox in North America and the UK while also recruiting a local team to conduct Australian operations.

On 27 July 2020, BritBox announced plans to expand the service to 25 more countries across Europe, Asia, the Middle East, South America and Africa. It was not specified which countries BritBox is targeting or what timeframe the rollout is expected to be completed. Following the announcement, ITV CEO Carolyn McCall said: "This international expansion plan will firmly establish BritBox as a global premium brand in a rapidly growing sector" and BBC Studios CEO Tim Davie added: "BritBox has very quickly found a place in viewers’ hearts and we know there is further appetite amongst international audiences who love great British content."

On 21 August 2020, ITV and BBC Studios announced they're set to invest more than A$35 million (€21.2m) into BritBox Australia, which is scheduled to launch in late 2020. BBC Studios and ITV will both invest A$17.7m ($12.7m) into the new SVoD platform over the next three years. ITV has since confirmed to the London Stock Exchange that BritBox Australia is on track to launch on time despite the COVID-19 pandemic, following the confirmation of investment from the UK broadcaster's subsidiary "ITV SVOD Australia Pty Ltd" into the BritBox Australia Partnership (branded as "BritBox Australia") over a period of three years.

In late September 2020, ITV group director, SVOD, Reemah Sakaan addressed the plans to ramp up the service's international presence. She said that BritBox would primarily target markets that consume large amounts of English-language entertainment including large ones such as India, as well as "passion"-driven markets such as the Nordic countries. She said that the joint venture would look at different structures depending on the specific opportunity, with some potentially taking a B2B2C (Business-to-Business-to-Consumer) form rather than a direct D2C (Direct to Consumer) approach, i.e. BritBox partnering with a local distributor or service provider. She added that BritBox is "focused on moving as fast as we can" into international markets.

The service launched in Australia on 23 November 2020, which ITV states is recognised globally as "Doctor Who Day".

On 16 February 2021, BBC Studios and ITV announced that BritBox is to launch in South Africa in the second half of 2021. Like most services outside the United Kingdom, the South African service will be a 50/50 joint venture between BBC Studios and ITV.

On 8 March 2021, it was announced that BritBox UK would join Amazon Video Channels in spring 2021 for UK Amazon Prime subscribers, and on 9 March it was announced that the UK service had surpassed 500,000 subscribers.

The launch date for the South African platform was announced on 27 July 2021, and it launched on 6 August 2021.

On 14 December 2021, BritBox International announced a distribution partnership with C More (TV 2 would be the distributor in Norway), bringing the service to C More and TV 2 Play subscribers in the Nordic countries of Denmark, Finland, Norway, and Sweden from early 2022. Standalone sign-up to BritBox directly is available through BritBox's website in these countries. The service launched on 28 April 2022.

=== Growth and profitability ===
Previous BritBox logo with old BBC and ITV Studios logos, used until 2024

On 5 December 2019, ITV's subscription video on demand Group Director Reemah Sakaan said in an interview that the service in North America had reached profitability; this was followed in 2020 by the news that the service there had surpassed 1 million users. A study commissioned by the UK media regulator Ofcom previously predicted that BritBox could have 2 million UK subscribers by the year 2023, alongside newly launched US-based SVODs Disney+ and Apple TV+. Following the COVID-19 pandemic and frequent national and local lockdowns, in August it was reported BritBox had surpassed 1.2 million subscribers in North America. BBC Studios said the streaming service "went from strength to strength, reaching 1.2 million subscribers in North America after year-end to become the fastest-growing targeted SVOD service."

On 6 October 2020, it was announced that Soumya Sriraman would depart as BritBox US and Canada's president, following the announcement that BritBox had reached 1.5 million subscribers in the US and Canada. The North American service was reported to exceeded all company targets and, according to Parks Associates OTT tracker, remains the fastest-growing targeted standalone SVOD service to have launched within the last three years. On 23 October, it was announced Emily Powers would lead the North American service when Soumya Sriraman departs at the end of October.

On 24 February 2021, Reemah Sakaan was announced to become the international CEO of BritBox. Her term at BritBox International will start in April 2021 and she would be tasked with expanding BritBox's operations outside the United Kingdom. She will oversee a team of around 100 content, customer management and business executives, including, Emily Powers, the EVP and head of BritBox North America, and Moira Hogan, country manager for BritBox Australia.

In July 2021, Diederick Santer was appointed international chief creative officer of BritBox.

=== BritBox UK and BritBox International split ===
In March 2022, ITV announced that its new ITVX streaming platform – an integrated advertising and subscription funded platform for the UK market which will take over from catch-up service ITV Hub – would also include access to BritBox for British consumers. The BBC decided to sell their share in BritBox UK to ITV, but still will remain a content provider to the service.

On 9 February 2024, it was announced that BritBox UK would officially shut down its standalone service on 30 April 2024, with all of its content moving to ITVX.

On 29 February 2024, it was announced that BBC Studios had paid £255 million to acquire ITV's shares in BritBox International, making it a fully owned subsidiary under the BBC Studios Global Media & Streaming Division. ITV, which will continue to fully own BritBox UK, stated that it was leaving the joint venture to focus on the growth of its ITVX service and ITV Studios and that its shareholders were yet to receive sale proceeds through a share buyback scheme set to launch after full-year reports are released on 7 March.

On 20 May 2024, it was announced that the streaming service would close its South African operations on 30 August 2024.

== Ownership and areas served ==
A variant of BritBox logo without BBC and ITV label, used from 2022 to 2026 for users in the United Kingdom

Map showing the countries where BritBox is currently present, countries which have confirmed upcoming launches of the service, and rumoured or anticipated regions where BritBox may launch (May 2022): Service available Upcoming launch Potential countries/regions

BritBox is operated by different entities depending on the country of operation. Prior to 2022, the BBC was directly involved in the ownership of the UK service. BritBox outside the UK are operated by BBC Studios, the BBC's commercial subsidiary, due to restrictions on TV Licence funding between domestic and international services.

The service in the United States and Canada is owned by BritBox LLC, a subsidiary of BBC Studios since its acquisition of ITV's fifty-percent stake in 2024. AMC Networks, the BBC's joint partner on the US cable channel BBC America, holds a non-voting minority stake in the service. This stake has been called into question since AMC's purchase of RLJ Entertainment — owner of rival British TV service Acorn TV — in 2018, with it and the company's other streaming services (AMC+, Shudder, Allblk, HIDIVE, and Philo) posing a potential conflict of interest.

The service in the United Kingdom is wholly owned by ITV. The service was originally a joint venture of the BBC and ITV. Channel Four Television Corporation and Paramount Networks UK & Australia on behalf of Channel 5 offered content for the service in the UK but took no shares in the joint venture operator. In March 2022, ITV announced that it had bought out the remaining stakes of the service it did not already own, and that it planned to integrate the service into an upcoming video on demand platform known as ITVX.

The service in Australia is operated by the BritBox Australia Partnership, originally owned equally (50%) by both BBC Studios and ITV and currently run solely by BBC Studios. It launched on 23 November 2020.

The service in South Africa was equally owned by BBC Studios and ITV at 50% shares each until February 2024, when ITV's shares were acquired by BBC Studios.

The services in the Nordic countries are distributed by C More in Denmark and Finland, and by TV 2 in Norway and Sweden. Signups to BritBox International directly are available through its website.

BritBox ownership by country
| Country | Launch date | Entity | BBC Studios share | ITV share | Notes |
|---|---|---|---|---|---|
| United States | 7 March 2017 | BritBox LLC | Majority (Note: Exact percentages unknown); 100% voting control | | AMC Networks non-voting minority share |
| Canada | 14 February 2018 | BritBox LLC | 100% | | |
| United Kingdom | 7 November 2019 | BritBox SVOD Ltd | | 100% | Between 2019 and 2022, was 10% owned directly by the BBC; became part of ITVX in November 2022 |
| Australia | 23 November 2020 | The BritBox Australia Partnership | 100% | | |
| South Africa | 6 August 2021 | BritBox International | 100% | | BritBox South Africa ended on 30 August 2024. |
| Nordic countries (Note: Denmark, Finland, Norway and Sweden only) | 28 April 2022 | BritBox International | 100% | | Distribution partnership with C More Entertainment and TV 2 (Norway); non-C More and TV 2 subscribers can sign up for BritBox directly. |

== Content ==
=== Original programmes ===
In September 2017, BritBox released a reconstruction of the Doctor Who story The Wheel in Space using the surviving episodes and reconstruction using Tele-snaps. In July 2018, The Bletchley Circle: San Francisco made its debut, the first original drama series in which BritBox held a direct production role.

More original content was set to be commissioned and produced for 2020, following the platform's UK launch. The BBC stated: "The first new show is expected to be commissioned soon and will be available to BritBox viewers from 2020". The goal is to offer exclusive content only available on BritBox, rather than the BBC and ITV's UK VOD services BBC iPlayer and ITV Hub. The annual budget for original programmes was, according to BBC News, to be in the tens of millions of pounds.

ITV pledged to invest up to £65m in the joint venture over the next two years to 2021, and the BBC said its own pledge would be in the "tens of millions".

It was confirmed in March 2020 that the first original commission to be shown on BritBox UK would be a revival of the satirical puppet show Spitting Image. The series, featuring 100 new puppets, debuted on 3 October 2020.

In the table below, "exclusive" refers to a programme where it is only available on, whilst "debut" refers to the platform a programme is first available on.

==== Drama ====
| Title | Genre | Premiere | Platform(s) | Series/episodes | Status | Notes |
|---|---|---|---|---|---|---|
| The Bletchley Circle: San Francisco | Crime mystery | 25 July 2018 | United States debut | 1 series, 8 episodes | Renewed. | Co-production between ITV and BritBox US. BritBox US's first original |
| The Pembrokeshire Murders | Crime thriller | 11 January 2021 | | Miniseries, 3 episodes | Aired. | Co-production between ITV and BritBox US |
| Honour | Crime drama | 29 October 2020 | United Kingdom | 1 series, 2 episodes | Co-production between ITV and BritBox US | |
| The Mallorca Files | Police procedural/Crime drama | TBA | TBA | TBA | Co-production between ITV and BritBox US and Canada | |
| There She Goes | Comedy drama | TBA | TBA | TBA | TBA | |
| The Bay | Crime drama | TBA | TBA | TBA | TBA | |
| The Long Call | Crime drama | 2021 | | | Co-production between ITV and BritBox US | |
| A Spy Among Friends | Cold War espionage thriller | 2022 | United Kingdom debut | 1 series, 6 episodes | On production, co-production between ITV Studios and Sony Pictures Television, shared with Spectrum | BritBox's first drama commission in the UK |
| The Beast Must Die | Revenge thriller | 27 May 2021 | United Kingdom debut | 1 series, 5 episodes | Co-production between New Regency Television and Scott Free Films | First drama to be shot for BritBox UK. |
| Crime | Crime thriller | 18 November 2021 | United Kingdom exclusive | 1 series, 6 episodes | In production, production from Buccaneer Media, shared rights with Cineflix rights | |
| Magpie Murders | Crime drama/Murder mystery | 2022 | United Kingdom exclusive | | Commissioned, production from Eleventh Hour Films, shared with PBS Masterpiece | |
| Sanditon | Historical drama | TBA (Series 1, 2019 on ITV) | United Kingdom exclusive | Series 2-, 2 series (Series 1 for ITV) | Renewed, production from Red Planet Pictures, shared with PBS Masterpiece with BritBox UK as the UK exclusive streamer. | Series 1, as 8 episodes, was initially broadcast on ITV, later series to be broadcast on BritBox UK first. |
| Marlow | Crime thriller | 2022 | United Kingdom exclusive | 1 series, 8 episodes | Commissioned, production from Motive Pictures and Endeavor Content. | |
| Murder in Provence | Crime Drama | 1 March 2022 | All platforms | 1 series, 3 episodes | Aired. | BritBox's first drama commission in the UK and the US. The drama would be BritBox's first original that is available on all of its platforms (a pan-territory original). Production from Monumental Television (ITV Studios) |
| Hotel Portofino | Historical Drama | 27 January 2022 | TBA | 6 episodes | Renewed for Season 2. | Commissioned, co-production between ITV and BetaFilm Group |
| Sister Boniface Mysteries | Crime Drama | 2022 | BritBox/UKTV | 1 series, 10 episodes | Renewed for Season 2. | Spin-off from Father Brown |
| Why Didn't They Ask Evans? | Crime Drama | 2022 | BritBox | Miniseries, 3 episodes | Aired | |
| Beyond Paradise (TV series) | Crime Drama | 24 February 2023 | Britbox | 4 series, 27 episodes | renewed | Spin-off of Death in Paradise. |

==== Comedy ====
| Title | Genre | Premiere | Platform(s) | Series/episodes | Status | Notes |
|---|---|---|---|---|---|---|
| Spitting Image | Adult puppeteering/Political satire/Black comedy | First series: 3 October 2020; Second series: 11 September 2021 | United Kingdom debut | 2 series | Renewed, production from Avalon Television | BritBox UK's "first original commission" |
| The Dry | Comedy drama | 2022 | United Kingdom exclusive | 1 series, 8 episodes | In-production, produced by Element Pictures, in association with Fís Eireann/Screen Ireland and ITV Studios, in partnership with RTÉ. | |

==== Factual ====
| Title | Genre | Premiere | Platforms(s) | Series/episodes | Status | Notes |
|---|---|---|---|---|---|---|
| Secrets of the Krays | Crime documentary | 12 May 2021 | United Kingdom exclusive | 1 series, 3 episodes | Commissioned, production from ITN Productions | BritBox's first original factual commission. |

=== Film and television deals ===
In addition to containing the catalogues of BBC and ITV television, BritBox UK includes content from Channel 4 (including Film4), and Paramount Skydance through the UK channels Channel 5 and Comedy Central.

Other potential networks to offer content or ownership of BritBox include: NBCUniversal (owned by Comcast) and BT. Such collaboration would greatly increase BritBox's catalogue and financial resources when competing with other streaming platforms like Netflix, Disney+ and Amazon Prime Video. BT and NBCUniversal were reportedly in early talks with BritBox, but the progress of the talks have yet to be stated, with NBCUniversal investing in their streaming service, Peacock in the US from 2020 and its parent Comcast owning Sky's UK streaming service Now TV, making full collaboration with NBCUniversal unlikely. BT has since signed a partnership with BritBox in which the service will complement its content.

In the early days of BritBox, Channel 4 was reportedly in talks with BritBox for a long period; ITV chief executive Carolyn McCall confirmed to Radio Times that talks were "continuing" with Channel 4 and said that ITV would "welcome Channel 4 to BritBox". On 6 November, The Guardian reported that Channel 4 is to join BritBox, with its content available on the service from April 2020.

However, Channel 4, a publisher-broadcaster, must commission UK content from independent production companies and currently works with around 300 companies across the UK every year. As such, Channel 4 potentially lacks the streaming rights to many of the shows it broadcasts. Many independent broadcasters potentially waive these rights to strike other deals with larger SVODs (for outside-UK rights) while retaining control over their intellectual property. This would therefore potentially cause the UK platform to have differing content from the international platforms.

Content co-produced between British broadcasters and larger SVODs like Netflix and Prime Video are not likely to be available on all or most BritBox platforms. This includes shows like the ITV Studios produced, BBC series Bodyguard, which a BritBox spokesperson said "Can't come back home", adding that "going forward, [BritBox] won't licence things to Netflix and Amazon in the first place because we now have a home, a streaming service in the UK".

With programming rights becoming an important issue for BritBox, the BBC and ITV have worked to keep programming rights by making deals, purchasing production companies (as with ITV Studios) or producing content for each other.

In September 2020, BritBox UK's managing director, Will Harrison, said in terms of distribution, BritBox UK's availability had expanded to some 21 million devices – equating to some 13 million homes in the UK – meaning that BritBox didn't need a pay-TV distribution partner, although Harrison admitted that BritBox would like to continue those relationships, given the benefits of integration and marketing with their partners. "We continue to have those conversations", he said, meaning BritBox's focus is primarily on developing direct relationships and device rollouts rather than developing relationships with platforms. He advised that in early October 2020, BT was launching an offer for its broadband customers to get six months BritBox for free on its YouView box. "That's eight million BT broadband homes."

Harrison added that the expansion of catch-up windows for iPlayer and ITV Hub meant that BritBox was also looking at non-exclusive content. He clarified that two-thirds of content on BritBox should remain fully exclusive "so we can live with a bit of overlap". He said that BritBox could also act as a source of complete box sets alongside the catch-up services.

Film and television deals for BritBox
| Broadcaster | Distributor | Content provided | Date joined | Content added | Contract | Platforms | Notes | Exceptions |
|---|---|---|---|---|---|---|---|---|
| BBC | BBC (Content, UK only) | Archive, original programming | 7 November 2019 | On UK launch | Content provider, former UK owner | UK | Content shared* with BBC iPlayer up to 12 months after airing Collaborations (with HBO, Prime etc.) are likely not included | Co-produced content with other SVODs. Leased content to other networks |
| BBC | BBC Studios (internationally) | Archive, original programming | 7 March 2017 | On US launch | Owner | US, Canada, and Australia | Collaborations (with HBO, Prime etc.) are likely not included | Co-produced content with other SVODs. Leased content to other networks |
| ITV | ITV Studios | Archive, original programming | 7 March 2017 | On launch | Owner | All | Content shared* (to be merged) with ITV Hub up to 30 days after airing (UK) Collaborations are likely not included | Co-produced content with other SVODs. Leased content to other networks |
| Channel Four Television Corporation | Channel Four Television Corporation | Original programming | 6 November 2019 | Apr 2020–23 | 3 years | UK | Content shared* with All 4 up to 31 days after airing British TV box sets (otherwise available on All 4) and British films (from Film4) only. Collaborations are likely not included A collection of twenty-five titles, primarily from the Film4 library, including Trainspotting, Beast, Charlotte Gray and The Hatton Garden Job which will be available on BritBox UK from 17 September. A further twenty-five titles will be added before the end of 2020. | Co-produced content with other SVODs. Leased content to other networks |
| Channel Four Television Corporation | Film4 | Original films | 6 November 2019 | Sep 2020–23 | 3 years | UK | Content shared* with All 4 up to 31 days after airing British TV box sets (otherwise available on All 4) and British films (from Film4) only. Collaborations are likely not included A collection of twenty-five titles, primarily from the Film4 library, including Trainspotting, Beast, Charlotte Gray and The Hatton Garden Job which will be available on BritBox UK from 17 September. A further twenty-five titles will be added before the end of 2020. | Co-produced content with other SVODs. Leased content to other networks |
| Paramount Global (Paramount Networks UK & Australia) | Channel 5 | Original programming | 20 September 2019 | Nov 2019 (UK launch) | TBC | UK | Channel 5 Content shared* with My5 up to 30 days after airing. | Co-produced content with other SVODs. Leased content to other networks |
| Paramount Global (Paramount Networks UK & Australia) | Comedy Central UK | Original British programming | 20 September 2019 | Nov 2019 (UK launch) | TBC | UK | British comedies from Comedy Central only. | Non-British Content |
| BT (Content) | – | Partnership | 7 November 2019 | No content (promotional) | – | UK | BritBox will become available to the millions of customers who subscribe to its pay-TV service, which broadcasts programming such as Champions League football | – |
| Various British Channels (BBC, ITV, C4 etc.) | Endemol Shine International | Distribution rights to limited programmes | 16 October 2019 | – | – | US Canada | | – |
| Various British Channels (BBC, ITV, C4 etc.) | Kew Media Distribution | Distribution rights to limited programmes | 16 October 2019 | – | – | US Canada | | – |
| Various British Channels (BBC, ITV, C4 etc.) | DRG | Distribution rights to limited programmes | 21 January 2020 | Jan 2020 | – | – | Package of British drama and comedy titles. | – |
| UK Performing Arts | Royal Shakespeare Company | Part of a wide selection of titles added to BritBox's popular and growing ‘Centre Stage’ collection, which features music concerts, documentaries and comedy and celebrates outstanding British entertainment and performers. | | | | | | |
| UK Performing Arts | The Donmar Warehouse | Part of a wide selection of titles added to BritBox's popular and growing ‘Centre Stage’ collection, which features music concerts, documentaries and comedy and celebrates outstanding British entertainment and performers. | | | | | | |
| UK Performing Arts | Other comedies, tragedies, ballets and operas from the UK's pre-eminent performers | Part of a wide selection of titles added to BritBox's popular and growing ‘Centre Stage’ collection, which features music concerts, documentaries and comedy and celebrates outstanding British entertainment and performers. | | | | | | |
| Anderson Entertainment | "Old School" collection of cult kids’ TV shows | | | | | | | – |

* after airing, not all content is expected to be on BritBox during the stated time frame.

Other partners
| Collaborator | Service provided | Date announced | Available in | Notes |
|---|---|---|---|---|
| BT (Consumer) | Products | 7 November 2019 | UK | "[BT] to create a range of products and offers that feature access to BritBox for millions of customers across its brands and services", more information in coming months. In October 2020, BT extended their offer of 6 Months Free BritBox for BT Broadband and TV Customers. |
| EE | Exclusive mobile partner | 7 November 2019 | UK | A free extended 6-month subscription is available to all EE pay monthly mobile and tablet customers for an extended free trial period. |

== Criticism ==
=== Excluded and controversial content ===
A big part of the BritBox catalogue is the extensive archives of the public service broadcasters, BritBox faces the challenge of hosting content that contains "outdated stereotypes and opinions." In response to this, BritBox has announced that it would not include classic homegrown series that are deemed to be inappropriate for "modern audiences."

BritBox bosses have said a range of older shows, such as the BBC's Till Death Us Do Part and It Ain't Half Hot Mum, as well as ITV's Love Thy Neighbour, will not appear on the service because of content deemed racist or otherwise unacceptable. Reemah Sakaan, the senior ITV executive responsible for launching the subscription video-on-demand service, said "We also recomply everything that goes on to BritBox [with modern TV viewing standards]. There's also the ability to create bespoke warnings around key programming."

Sakaan confirmed that Till Death Us Do Part, first aired on BBC1 in 1965, which features the bigoted character Alf Garnett, and ITV's 1970s series Love Thy Neighbour, a sitcom about a West Indian couple who move next door to a White British couple, will not appear on the service. Some individual episodes of the BBC's Only Fools and Horses and a Doctor Who serial from the original run (The Talons of Weng-Chiang, 1977) are also deemed problematic. In the Doctor Who serial, people of Chinese extraction are termed "inscrutable Chinks" and an English actor performs in "yellowface". Some Fawlty Towers episodes will run with warnings of offensive language. The Doctor Who serial from 1977 has a warning attached indicating "Contains stereotypes that some may find offensive."

In June 2020, following the widespread 2020 Anti-racism protests, shows like Little Britain were removed from BritBox, along with others, due to the use of blackface in the programme.

=== Non-exclusive deals ===
The sale of rights to BBC and Channel 5 content has caused some reporters to be wary of BritBox's viability as a platform for new content, due to deals with larger SVODs to exclusively stream newer BBC content and non-exclusive deals with Sky and Now TV to access Channel 5 box sets. However, many BBC Studios' deals have given licences to some of its content to many other SVODs on a non-exclusive basis. With newer or co-produced series more likely to be exclusive to certain SVODs, shown with the new 2020 original commissions being BritBox UK exclusive. Whereas Sky already has existing deals with not only Channel 5, but Channel 4 and the BBC to have certain box sets on their Sky and Now TV platforms in the UK.

All current and future series of the 2005 revival of Doctor Who will be exclusive to stream on HBO Max (now Max) in the US, following a deal between the two, on 1 August 2019. Other content from BBC Studios such as The Honourable Woman, Luther, Top Gear, and the British version of The Office would be available on HBO Max on a non-exclusive basis, meaning they would potentially be also available on BritBox.

On 1 April 2019, a 10-year content partnership was agreed between BBC Studios and Discovery, which was to see Discovery become the exclusive global home of the BBC's landmark natural history programmes including the Planet Earth, Blue Planet and Life franchises for SVOD. The Dynasties series, hosted by Sir David Attenborough, is included in the deal, as are future BBC-commissioned landmark series. This deal applies worldwide except in the UK, Ireland and Greater China, meaning such series may be unavailable on BritBox platforms outside the United Kingdom. Upcoming co-produced content between Discovery and BBC Studios would be exclusive to Discovery's upcoming streaming platform outside the UK.

The Discovery deal includes around 500 hours of non-exclusive content, which will still be available on other streaming services. A BBC Studios spokesperson told TBI that the relationship with Discovery is "very significant and important but it is not 100% exclusive on all titles in all regions and is, therefore, able to co-exist alongside regional deals of this type", following BBC Studios' deal to provide factual content to Greek telco OTE's pay-TV service Cosmote TV.

=== Limitations ===
With limitations to its budget and original programming when compared to other SVODs, BritBox faces strong competition in the increasingly crowded streaming market. Critics warn that BritBox needs to greatly increase its financial firepower and original programming to compete in especially the UK market, against rivals, Netflix, Prime Video and Disney+, following reports more Brits would subscribe to Disney+ over BritBox. Critics say that BritBox is no rival, and cannot rival Netflix without substantial resources. BritBox also faces direct competition with Acorn TV, an American streaming service that provides many British television programmes, among others, with the service recently launching in the UK.

== Platforms ==
The list of available programmes differs between the Australian, Canadian, South African, British and American platforms. For example, BritBox carries Coronation Street in the US but not in Canada, where the corresponding rights have long been held by CBC Television. Meanwhile, in the UK, TV shows, especially produced by independent production companies (like the BBC show Peaky Blinders) may appear on the UK BritBox, as the BBC or ITV have the domestic broadcasting rights, but may not be available on BritBox elsewhere, due to the independent production companies giving international rights to services like Netflix. This means that depending on whether the BBC and ITV own only domestic rights, programmes on UK BritBox may not also be available on its international platforms outside of the UK. Alternatively, shows like Living the Dream may not appear on the UK BritBox, as it is broadcast by Sky and available on Sky's streaming service Now TV in the UK, but currently appears on the US BritBox.

BBC and ITV content currently on other streaming services are likely to be exclusive to BritBox once the other SVOD licences expire, therefore potentially leading to harmony in programming between the platforms. Any original content produced for all BritBox platforms is set to be exclusively on BritBox, however, some UK commissioned content may be UK exclusive.

Whether content co-produced between British broadcasters and larger SVODs, like Netflix and Prime Video, will be on any BritBox platforms is unclear; these include shows like Bodyguard which a BritBox spokesperson said "can't come back home", and who added that "going forward, we [BritBox] won't licence things to Netflix and Amazon in the first place because we now have a home, a streaming service in the UK", they also added that in response to not licensing to other SVODs, since its focus is on UK-produced series, the platform would not compete to acquire the rights to US or international shows.

Recently aired or current shows made for the BBC, ITV, Channel 4 and Channel 5 terrestrially in the United Kingdom, would appear on their VOD services, BBC iPlayer, ITVX, Channel 4 and My5 respectively before BritBox. These shows would then move to BritBox at a later date, then be exclusive to BritBox once the shows have expired on the terrestrial VOD, which is 30 days for ITVX and My5, 31 days for Channel 4 and 12 months for BBC iPlayer.

New content not made exclusively for BritBox, but for the BBC for example, may not be available on BritBox platforms outside the UK, due to deals struck with other SVODs such as HBO Max and Discovery.

=== United States ===
BritBox's launch in the United States was announced in December 2016; it launched on 7 March 2017.

Among the shows offered upon BritBox's initial launch, were the US premieres of New Blood and Tutankhamun. In addition, other episodes of new programmes available on the service include:

| Title | Genre | Original network | Available platforms | Status | Notes |
|---|---|---|---|---|---|
| Casualty | Medical drama | BBC | U.S., Canada | Renewed | |
| Coronation Street | Soap opera | ITV | U.S. | Renewed | |
| EastEnders | Soap opera | BBC | U.S., Canada | Renewed | |
| Emmerdale | Soap opera | ITV | U.S., Canada | Renewed | |
| Holby City | Medical drama | BBC | U.S., Canada | Ended | |

On 1 August 2019, HBO Max announced its acquisition of library rights to several BBC Studios series, including the first 11 seasons of the 2005 Doctor Who revival, as well as future seasons 12–14. The Honourable Woman, Luther, Top Gear, and the original British series The Office are also some other shows in the acquisition. HBO Max will also stream future seasons of Doctor Who after their initial run on BBC America. Newer Doctor Who would be exclusive to HBO Max, with the other shows in the deal sold on a non-exclusive basis.

=== Canada ===
BritBox launched in Canada on 14 February 2018, on launch the service included a free 7-day trial and in which content can be streamed on the web, on an iOS app, Apple TV, Android, Samsung TVs, Chromecast and Roku. It comes with a free 7-day introductory trial and priced at CA$8.99 per month on launch. Users who signed up for the service in the U.S. will be able to access their subscription in Canada.

The catalogue of content on the Canadian platform is similar to the American platform, but minor differences do exist; for example, Coronation Street is not available on BritBox in Canada due to CBC Television holding the Canadian broadcasting rights.

=== United Kingdom ===
BritBox launched in the UK on 7 November 2019. Unlike other platforms, the UK platform would include content from the BBC, ITV, Channel 4 (which includes Film4 Productions), Channel 5 and Comedy Central UK.

BritBox UK signed a partnership deal with Channel 4 in 2019, allowing the service to host over a thousand hours of content from All 4 over the next three years. New series will continue to appear on BritBox one month after transmission of the last episode on Channel 4's channels.

An exclusive Film4 curated service featuring iconic British films was announced to follow the launch of Channel 4 content on BritBox later in 2020. On 21 August, BritBox UK confirmed a collection of 25 titles, primarily drawn from the Film4 library, including: Trainspotting, Beast, Charlotte Gray and The Hatton Garden Job which were made available on the service from 17 September 2020. A further 25 titles were added before the end of 2020.

In 2022, ITV became the sole owner of the service in the UK, following its purchase of the BBC's 10% stake in the company. In 2022, when ITVX launched its ad-free premium service, it included Britbox programmes.

In April 2024, BritBox ceased streaming in the UK as a standalone app, as well as no longer being featured as part of other services, such as Amazon Prime Video. Its content has been absorbed entirely into ITVX's premium streaming service.

=== Other countries ===
==== Australia ====
On 5 March 2020, the BBC and ITV announced that BritBox is to launch in Australia in late 2020. The service finally launched in Australia on 23 November 2020.

==== South Africa ====
On 27 July 2021, the BBC and ITV set 6 August 2021 as the launch date for the platform, with the service priced at R99.99 per month, R999.90 per year, and a 7-day free trial. It launched on 6 August 2021.

==== Nordic countries ====
On 14 December 2021, BritBox International announced a distribution partnership with C More (TV 2 would be the distributor in Norway), bringing the service to C More and TV2 subscribers in the Nordic countries of Sweden, Finland, Denmark, and Norway from early 2022. Users in these countries can sign up directly to BritBox through its website. The service launched on 28 April 2022 in the four countries. In Denmark, the service is included in all C More subscription packages. In Finland, the service is available to subscribers to C More, C More Hockey and C More Total+. In Sweden, the service is available to subscribers of C More Standard or of a higher package.

== Technical requirements ==
BritBox is only available to residents of Australia, Canada, Denmark, Finland, Norway, South Africa, Sweden, the United Kingdom and the United States. Canadian and US residents can use BritBox in each other's countries (with differences in show availability due to rights restrictions). Users in the four Nordic countries can use the service throughout the European Union. Users of the UK, Australian and South African services can only access BritBox in their own country.

=== Operating systems ===
| Operating system | Version | Developer | Notes |
|---|---|---|---|
| Windows | 7 or later | Microsoft | – |
| Android | 4.4 (Kitkat) or later | Google | – |
| Mac OS | OS X 10.9 Mavericks or later | Apple | – |
| iOS | 10.1 or later | Apple | |

=== Web browsers ===
| Supported browsers as of 2020 | Version | Developer(s) |
|---|---|---|
| Chrome | – | Google |
| Firefox | – | Mozilla |
| Opera | – | Opera Software |
| Opera Chromium | – | Opera Software & Google |
| Edge Legacy | Stable & under 2 years old (pre-chromium/legacy as of 2020) | Microsoft |
| Edge (Chromium) | – | Microsoft & Google |
| Safari | Latest and previous stable major version | Apple |
| Android | Native | Google |

=== Compatible devices ===
Devices with native applications

| Products | Developer(s) | Device type(s) | Notes | Platform(s) | Software | Date(s) added |
|---|---|---|---|---|---|---|
| iPhone | Apple | Smartphone, Mobile devices | Labelled as 'iOS device' in Help & Support | All | Dedicated app | March 2017 (US); November 2019 (UK) |
| iPad | Apple | Tablet computer | Labelled as 'iOS device' in Help & Support and 'iOS tablet' in an ITV press release, likely includes iPad, which now uses iPadOS | All | Dedicated app | March 2017 (US); November 2019 (UK) |
| Android Devices | (Google) Android phone manufacturers including: Samsung, Huawei, LG, Google, Sony among others | Touchscreen mobile devices (Smartphones and Tablets) | – | All | Dedicated app | March 2017 (US); November 2019 (UK) |
| Apple TV | Apple | Digital Media Player microconsole | (TVOS) 4th Generation or later | All | Dedicated TV app | March 2017 (US); November 2019 (UK) |
| Samsung Tizen TV | Samsung | Smart TV (2016 onwards) | A partnership has been confirmed with Samsung, which will see the BritBox app hosted on Samsung Tizen TVs* from launch onwards (UK). "Samsung will be the first TV to launch the BritBox app and together, Samsung and BritBox have agreed to a co-marketing partnership that will see BritBox featured as a "Recommended App" on Samsung Smart TV's and joint marketing activity taking place in Q4 as the TV device market heads into its key sales season around Black Friday and Christmas." | All | Dedicated TV app | November 2019 (UK) |
| Panasonic Smart TV | Panasonic | Smart TV "Premium range" | "Panasonic has announced support for select TVs. The BritBox app now features on all 2019 TVs apart from the GX700 models; the X700B TVs and all above models from 2018, including the FZ series; and the EX, EZ, DX and CX series TVs." "Panasonic's premium range of televisions has featured the BritBox app since 10th December." Panasonic television models which support BritBox: GX800 and above, including GZ series, FX700B and above & FZ series, EX series & EZ series, DX series and CX series. | UK | Dedicated TV app | December 2019 (UK) |
| Vestel Smart TV | Vestel | Smart TV (2017 onwards) | "BritBox is now also available on a range of smart TVs using the Vestel platform, which allows owners of Toshiba, JVC, HITACHI, Bush, Digihome, Finlux, Logik, Luxor, Polaroid, Techwood and more TVs to effortlessly access the service via an app." "BritBox will be featured on model ranges from 2017 onwards and support for further Freeview Play compatible models will be added soon," added Hakan Kutlu, vice president of marketing, Vestel. | UK | Dedicated TV app | December 2019 (UK) |
| LG Smart TV | LG | Smart TV (2014 onwards) | | UK | Dedicated TV app | April 2020 (UK) |
| YouView | Partnership of: BT Group, TalkTalk Group, Arqiva, BBC, ITV, Channel Four Television Corporation, Channel 5 | 'hybrid' set-top box | Announcement on 27 September that Samsung TVs, Freeview Play and Youview would be the first distribution platforms (UK). Used by BT TV and TalkTalk TV, as well as Sony TVs and Humax PVRs. The availability date for BritBox will vary by ISP, manufacturer and model. Following an update to YouView software, BritBox is available to BT TV subscribers. The phased release is being rolled out for BT T2100, T2200 & T4000 devices. Found within the Players & Apps section of the device. | UK | Dedicated TV app | March 2020 (UK); May 2020 (UK) (on BT TV) |
| Freeview Play | DTV Services Ltd, a Joint Venture of: Arqiva, BBC, ITV, Channel Four Television Corporation, Sky | Set-top box | The availability date for BritBox will vary by manufacturer and model. | UK | Dedicated TV app | 2020 (UK) |
| Freesat | Joint venture of: BBC and ITV | Set-top box | | UK | | September 2020 (UK) |
| Amazon Channels | Feature of Amazon and Prime Video | Service | The ability to subscribe to Amazon Channels is exclusive to Prime members, but you'll need to pay individual subscription fees for individual channels. BritBox is an available channel for US and Canadian Prime customers. Available on all Amazon Video capable devices and platforms. | US | via Prime Video app | August 2017 (US) |
| Amazon Channels | Feature of Amazon and Prime Video | Service | The ability to subscribe to Amazon Channels is exclusive to Prime members, but you'll need to pay individual subscription fees for individual channels. BritBox is an available channel for US and Canadian Prime customers. Available on all Amazon Video capable devices and platforms. | Canada | via Prime Video app | June 2020 (CA) |
| Amazon Channels | Feature of Amazon and Prime Video | Service | The ability to subscribe to Amazon Channels is exclusive to Prime members; they need to pay for an add-on subscription to BritBox through the service. BritBox is an available channel for UK Prime customers. Available on all Amazon Video capable devices and platforms from 27 April 2021. | UK | via Prime Video app | April 2021 (UK) |
| Roku | Roku, Inc. | Digital media player | | US, UK | | March 2017 (US); August 2021 (UK) |
| AirPlay | Apple | Wireless media streamer | | US | | |
| Chromecast | Google | Digital media player | "The BritBox Chromecast app allows subscribers to view BritBox on any television with an HDMI port by adding a £30 Chromecast device. Viewers can use their iOS or Android smartphone to browse and select from the biggest collection of British box-sets, and then enjoy watching it on the big screen using their phone as a remote control." | All | Dedicated apps | March 2017 (US); December 2019 (UK) |
| Amazon Fire TV | Amazon | Digital media player | "We look forward to adding even more ways to enjoy the best of British creativity in 2020, including more FreeView Playsets, YouView devices and Amazon FireTV." | All | Dedicated apps | February 2020 (UK) |
| Netgem.tv | Netgem | 'hybrid TV platform' TV streaming service on ISPs and OTT devices | | UK | Dedicated apps | January 2020 (UK) |
| Fetch TV | Fetch TV | Set-top box | | Australia | Dedicated apps | November 2020 (AU) |
| Telstra TV | Telstra | Set-top box | | Australia | Dedicated apps | November 2020 (AU) |
| Xbox | Microsoft | Video game console | On Xbox One and Xbox Series X | UK | via dedicated app on Xbox Microsoft Store | October 2021 (UK) |
| Virgin TV | Virgin Media O2 | Set-top box | | UK | via dedicated app | March 2022 (UK) |
