= Kangaroo (video on demand) =

Cancelled video on demand platform

Kangaroo was the working title for a proposed video on demand platform offering content from BBC Worldwide (the commercial arm of the BBC), itv.com and Channel 4's 4oD (collectively UK VOD LLP), initially expected to launch in 2008, but blocked by the Competition Commission (now Competition and Markets Authority) in 2009.

Following the commission's rejection of the bid, the technology platform was put up for sale, and the broadcasters then moved on to Project Canvas and YouView, and later to BritBox. The project was bought by Arqiva for about £8 million on 23 July 2009, promising to launch in the 'coming months'. It was launched as SeeSaw in February 2010 but was shut down in October 2011.

== The original Project Kangaroo ==
Unlike the BBC iPlayer, which is funded through the licence fee and has no plans to carry any paid content, Kangaroo would have allowed users to purchase content from a large back catalogue. As noted below, the plan to link to content on BBC iPlayer means that it would have provided a single broadband VOD service for the key three broadcasters in the UK. Kangaroo was the project name; the final name and brand of the service was never announced, but it was believed it would have been known as SeeSaw.

The three networks behind the project would continue to offer content independently of the service, with ITV plc and Channel 4 planning to offer catch up services through their own websites, and the BBC saying that it will not replace the iPlayer, but content from the iPlayer would be "listed within" the new service. However, it was expected that 4oD would be subsumed into Kangaroo.

It was announced on 14 April 2008 that Ashley Highfield, Director of Future Media and Technology at the BBC, had been appointed the CEO of Kangaroo. Highfield left the project in November 2008, to work for Microsoft.

On 30 June 2008, the UK's Office of Fair Trading referred the proposal to the Competition Commission with concerns that "there was a danger that the platform could be too powerful". The Commission published an interim report on 3 December saying that the service could "hurt competition" and a final report was published on 4 February 2009, formally blocking the project.

== SeeSaw ==
Following the commission's rejection of the bid, the technology platform was put up for sale. The bidders included Orange (who pulled out) and Arqiva. Arqiva launched SeeSaw in February 2010 as a video-on-demand Internet TV service. It sold a majority stake to US investment firm Criterion Capital Partners in July 2011, but this was insufficient to save the service, which closed from lack of funding and content in October 2011.

== Project Canvas ==
Shortly after Project Kangaroo was blocked in 2009, Project Canvas was announced as a partnership between the BBC, BT and ITV plc. It differed from Kangaroo in that it was a proposed TV platform rather than a video-on-demand service. After a lengthy regulatory approval process, it was finally launched in July 2012 as YouView, a hybrid platform using a set-top box combining free-to-air digital terrestrial television channels from Freeview using an aerial connection, and TV on demand ("catch-up TV") services using a broadband internet connection.

== BritBox ==
In July 2019 the BBC and ITV announced plans for their joint-venture streaming service BritBox (then only available in the United States and Canada) to be launched in the last quarter of 2019 in the UK. In the wake of the announcement journalists linked the two projects, describing BritBox as Kangaroo's successor 11 years on. The main purpose of BritBox is for the traditional UK broadcasters to take a share of the UK streaming market from American rivals Netflix and Amazon Prime, some calling the venture "British Netflix". BritBox was launched in the UK on 7 November 2019.
