= BBC iPlayer =

Television and radio streaming service

- Logo used since 2021

- BBC iPlayer homepage in November 2018
- Developer: BBC
- Release: 25 December 2007; 18 years ago
- Written in: JavaScript, Adobe AIR, Objective-C, Java
- Platform: List: Windows, webOS, macOS, Linux, iOS, Android, Android TV, Apple TV, Amazon Fire TV, Chromecast, Roku, Virgin Media (Streaming only), Freesat (beta), Sky Go (part of On Demand service), Sky TV, BT TV (part of On Demand service), Now TV, PlayStation 3, PlayStation 4, PlayStation 5, Xbox 360, Xbox One, Xbox Series X/S, tvOS, Windows Phone 8, YouView, Wii (discontinued on 10 February 2015), Wii U (discontinued in January 2017)
- Available in: English, Welsh, Scottish Gaelic, Irish
- Type: Media player software
- Licence: BBC iPlayer applications are proprietarily licensed. Users also require a TV licence and a BBC account
- Website: www.bbc.co.uk/iplayer

BBC iPlayer (stylised as iPLAYER or BBC iPLAYER) is a video on demand service from the British Broadcasting Corporation (BBC). The service is available over-the-top on a wide range of devices, including mobile phones and tablets, personal computers and smart televisions. iPlayer services are available in Great Britain, Northern Ireland, the Isle of Man and the Channel Islands with no commercial advertising, as they are funded by the TV Licence, which is required by law to use the service.

The terms BBC iPlayer, iPlayer, and BBC Media Player refer to various methods of viewing or listening to the same content. BBC iPlayer launched in 2007. Previously, a separate BBC iPlayer Radio brand was used for radio services but this was replaced with BBC Sounds in 2018. The current logo and rebranding to "iPLAYER" has been in use since 2021.

Currently, some programmes can be watched in UHD on iPlayer as part of an ongoing trial, as well as streaming major live events in 4K on iPlayer.

== History ==
The BBC iPlayer logo used from 2020 until 2021. The logo used from 2007 to 2020 looked identical to this one, but had the BBC logo in black instead of pink.

The BBC iPlayer logo used from 2021 to 2022. Currently remains in use as a secondary logo.

On 6 October 2003, Ashley Highfield, Director of New Media and Technology at the BBC, announced in a speech to the Royal Television Society that the BBC iPlayer (then called the BBC interactive Media Player) was ‘in development’, and was to be the BBC's ‘gateway to the future. It will work both on the PC screen, when you've got a mouse in your hand, and the TV screen, controlled by an ordinary remote control. iMP will allow you to record programmes in advance, like Sky+ or the humble video recorder. It will stream programmes live and will allow you to download any content we have broadcast, say in the last week.’

By 2004 the service had undergone technical trials, as announced by Highfield in a speech at the Broadband Britain Summit where he gave more details: ‘iMP enables people to download television and radio programmes, choose to record whole series such as EastEnders, catch up on programmes they have missed and watch or listen to them on any device they want all through peer-to-peer sharing on a broadband connection.’

In 2005, following interventions from the BBC Trust who had been lobbied by the broadband service providers that such a service as the BBC iPlayer (née iMP) could put unprecedented demand on their infrastructure, Highfield announced go-ahead had finally been given for a ‘content trial, which will begin in September and last for three months. The service builds on the success of our RadioPlayer and offers BBC audiences the chance to catch up on TV and radio programmes they might have missed for up to seven days after the original broadcast.’

Following this, and subsequent trials, the BBC Trust allowed the full development of BBC iPlayer to go ahead, including a wholesale re-negotiation of the content rights framework (allowing, for no additional charges to the BBC, programmes to be offered free to UK licence fee payers for a 7-day (initially) window after transmission - this rights renegotiation was arguably the most challenging aspect of the genesis of the iPlayer, and took 2 years).

The launch of the BBC iPlayer, and how it worked with, not against, the digital eco-system in the UK, was detailed in a speech given by Highfield at the IEA Future Of Broadcasting Conference: ’Our BBC iPlayer service, launching on 27 July, offering the last seven days of the BBC's TV programmes on–demand over the internet, has already helped all the players in the UK on–demand space. We established the rights frameworks with the relevant rights bodies such as PACT. We established the technology framework that enabled us to use a peer–to–peer service that kept our distribution costs down whilst keeping our rights holders happy, a framework that has been copied by both Sky and Channel 4. And by working closely with the internet service providers like Carphone Warehouse and Virgin Media, we believe the BBC iPlayer will drive new broadband take–up, and demand for higher connection speeds. Market impact? Yes – a positive one!’

BBC Redux was developed as a proof of concept for a cross-platform, Flash Video-based streaming system. BBC iPlayer left beta and went live on 25 December 2007. On 25 June 2008 a new-look iPlayer was launched, originally as a beta-test version alongside the earlier version. The site tagline was "Catch up on the last 7 days of BBC TV & Radio", reflecting that programmes were unavailable on iPlayer after this time (with some exceptions). The BBC states on its website that this is for copyright reasons. The marketing slogan was later changed to "Making the unmissable, unmissable". In May 2010 the site was updated again to include a recommendations feature and a "social makeover".

In February 2011, the BBC iPlayer was once again modified to include links to programmes from other broadcasters, including ITV, ITV2, ITV3, ITV4, Channel 4, E4, More4, Film4, Channel 5, 5Star, 5USA and S4C. The feature was added to the search function and the channels function. When users click on a programme by another broadcaster they are redirected to the relevant broadcaster's catch-up service (either ITV Player, 4oD or Demand Five).

In April 2014, BBC iPlayer was once again relaunched with a new look and a different user interface. From October 2014 the BBC extended the programme availability for programmes on iPlayer from 7 days to 30 days. The COVID-19 pandemic from 2020 and the subsequent lockdowns have changed this; many programmes are available for more than a year, and entire series – for example, Peaky Blinders, Top Gear, and Killing Eve – are available in their entirety going back to the first episode. However, for legal reasons, most news bulletins are available for only 24 hours after the initial broadcast (with the exception of World Business Report, Business Live, Victoria Derbyshire, Daily Politics, Politics Europe, Sunday Politics and Newsnight) . Some archive programming, such as Timewatch, is available for the long term. Select live programmes such as Saturday Mash-Up! are available for up to a week after broadcast, whilst others are available for up to a month.

Specific applications for mobile platforms were launched in February 2011, initially for iOS and Android devices, where the launch would have the biggest impact.

== Development ==
The user interface of the BBC Integrated Media Player (iMP) in 2006

The original iPlayer service was launched after undergoing two public trials. The first ran for three months in the summer of 2004, the second was a five-month trial by five thousand broadband users from October 2005 until 28 February 2006. iPlayer was heavily criticised for the delay in its launch, rebranding and cost to BBC licence-fee payers because no finished product had been released after four years of development. A new improved iPlayer service then had another very limited user trial, which began on 15 November 2006. At various times during its development iPlayer was known as the Integrated Media Player (iMP), Interactive Media Player, and MyBBCPlayer.

The iPlayer received the approval of the BBC Trust on 30 April 2007 and an open beta for Windows XP and Windows Server 2003 was launched at midnight on 27 July 2007, when it was announced that only a fixed number of people would be able to sign up for the service, with a controlled increase in users over the summer. The BBC had been criticised for saying that the iPlayer would 'launch' on 27 July 2007, when what was on offer was simply an extension of the beta to an open beta, admitting more users in a controlled manner. This was done reportedly to allow British ISPs and the BBC to gauge the effect of the iPlayer traffic on the Internet within the UK.

The open beta incorporated a media player, an electronic programme guide (EPG) and specially designed download client and allowed the download of BBC Television content by computers assigned to a United Kingdom-based IP address, for use up to thirty days after broadcast. However, it was available only to users of Windows XP.

This was a controversial decision by the BBC and led to a petition against the decision being posted on 10 Downing Street's e-petition website. The petition reached 16,082 signatures on 20 August 2007. The response from the Government was:

.. the Trust noted the strong public demand for the service to be available on a variety of operating systems. The BBC Trust made it a condition of approval for the BBC's on-demand services that the iPlayer is available to users of a range of operating systems and has given a commitment that it will ensure that the BBC meets this demand as soon as possible. They will measure the BBC's progress on this every six months and publish the findings.

On 16 October 2007, the BBC announced a strategic relationship with Adobe that would bring a limited streaming-only version of the iPlayer to Mac and Linux users and Windows users who cannot or do not wish to use the iPlayer download service, such as Windows 9x users. The streaming service was launched on 13 December 2007. Most programmes can be viewed for up to seven days after broadcast, unlike the thirty days provided by the download service.

Since January 2008, iPlayer has supported Mozilla Firefox under the Microsoft Windows platform for downloading content.

Before the iPlayer had even launched it was announced that the BBC, alongside ITV and Channel 4, was intending to launch a new video-on-demand platform, provisionally named Kangaroo. It was intended that Kangaroo would complement the video-on-demand services that these channels were already offering, including the iPlayer, by making programmes available once their 'catch-up' period had expired. The proposed Project Kangaroo service was conceived by Ashley Highfield and Ben McOwen Wilson with Highfield subsequently appointed CEO by the three broadcasters. The Kangaroo project was eventually abandoned and sold to Arqiva after being blocked by the Competition Commission early in 2009.

Following a deal between the BBC and cable television provider Virgin Media, the iPlayer service was made available through the provider's on-demand service. The cable service launched on 30 April 2008, and keeps the look and feel of the BBC iPlayer programme.

In response to a Freedom of Information Act request, the BBC revealed that by 8 April 2008, the iPlayer had cost £6 million to develop.

On 23 August 2008, a new feature, Series Stacking, was announced. This feature was rolled out on 13 September 2008 and allowed viewers to watch previous programmes from selected series until the series had ended, with a limit of thirteen weeks after first broadcast. Not all programmes will form part of the stack, however. The BBC Trust permitted 15% of content to be offered as part of the stacking service; soaps, news bulletins and review-based programmes will not be stacked, nor programmes containing material of a legal nature, such as Crimewatch.

On 19 December 2008, the BBC released, as part of the iPlayer Labs feature, iPlayer Desktop for OS X and Linux operating systems. This moved the download service away from the previous P2P-based distribution model and onto an HTTP download model.

On 20 April 2009, the BBC incorporated high-definition streams and downloads of some content on the iPlayer. There are plans to roll out the HD streams to devices such as the Virgin Set Top Box but no date has yet been set. An iPlayer application for the PlayStation 3 was announced by Sony in August 2009 and was released on 1 September 2009 along with the Firmware 3.0 update to coincide with the launch of the slimline PlayStation 3.

Another version of iPlayer was released in late 2009 as a 'channel' for the Nintendo Wii. This shows only low-definition videos of BBC shows up to seven days after their release on television. As of 2019, this version is unavailable due to the closure of the Wii Shop Channel.

On 28 July 2011, BBC Worldwide released an international version of the iPlayer.

Speaking in 2012, Ralph Rivera, BBC Director of Future Media, said: "In the same way as the BBC has a role in making sure there is a healthy TV ecosystem, the BBC should be playing the same sort of role in the digital sector. It's part of why we have a licence fee."

BBC Radio services delivered via iPlayer were relaunched on 8 October 2012 under the BBC iPlayer Radio brand. The rebranded service offered different functionality from the main iPlayer interface and a BBC iPlayer Radio smartphone app was also launched.

On 26 September 2013, BBC iPlayer Desktop was replaced by BBC iPlayer Downloads, which was no longer based on Adobe AIR. On the same date, the BBC stopped making programmes available to download in WMV format.

The BBC discontinued the RSS feed for iPlayer TV content in October 2014. This stopped some third-party tools such as the get_iplayer content downloader from working. In March 2016, an unofficial site restored access to this information.

In 2015, the BBC reported that it was moving towards playing audio and video content via open HTML5 standards in web browsers rather than via Flash or its Media Player mobile app.

In September 2015, it was revealed that as part of Tony Hall's "open BBC" strategy, coming primarily in response to budget cuts across the BBC that would require it to discontinue or factor some of its services, the BBC planned to offer third-party content through iPlayer in the future, as well as launch a spin-off, iPlay, which would be tailored towards children's content.

In September 2016, support for older Freeview and Freesat receivers manufactured between 2010 and 2014 was dropped.

On 30 October 2018, the BBC relaunched its iPlayer Radio services as BBC Sounds, including a newly designed website and mobile apps.

On 8 December 2020, chief content officer Charlotte Moore stated that the BBC would realign the leadership structure of its television services in April 2021 to prioritise the iPlayer, under which iPlayer Controller Dan McGolpin would become Portfolio Director for the iPlayer and the main BBC channels, and the role of Controller for each BBC channel would be replaced by a team of "portfolio editors" who would select programmes commissioned by the BBC's genre directors to be carried on the iPlayer and BBC channels.

== Television licence requirements ==
Before September 2016, a television licence was not required to stream either BBC television or radio programmes from the iPlayer that had already been broadcast, though a licence was still required in order to watch live content. Since 1 September 2016, a television licence has been required to view any iPlayer content, regardless of whether it is live or on-demand. Despite the requirement, the enforcement of this measure uses only a trust system, under which users must acknowledge a pop-up window warning of the new requirements. Neither the BBC nor TV Licensing announced any specific plans to implement detection measures.

In September 2016, the BBC also announced that users would eventually be required to sign in with a BBC ID account to access non-children's content on the service. In May 2017, the iPlayer began to encourage users to login with a BBC ID in preparation for this change. Media outlets suggested that the account requirement was intended to help the BBC collect personal information that could be used to trace those who were evading TV Licensing whilst using the iPlayer; Andrew Scott, launch director of the ongoing myBBC initiative, stated that the BBC might use account email addresses, along with existing methods, to help identify iPlayer users who did not hold a television licence. However, he repeatedly said that the account system was primarily intended to provide personalization features across BBC properties, such as content recommendations on the iPlayer, and the ability to continue watching a programme on one device from where it was left off on another.

== Computer platforms ==
=== 'iPlayer 1.0' ===
==== Download service ====
One of the key features of the original iPlayer download service was the use of peer-to-peer (P2P) technology to enable the distribution of large video files (i.e. TV programmes) to scale effectively. Once downloaded, the content was only playable within the iPlayer itself or Windows Media Player 10 or 11, and subject to digital rights management.

In December 2008, the BBC moved to an Adobe AIR-based client that downloaded content via HTTP rather than P2P. The new system replaced the Windows DRM system with Adobe's own. DRM software prevents it from being directly copied to another medium (e.g. another computer or CD-ROM) and allowed the BBC to control how long the programmes remain watchable. Programmes were available for download for seven days following broadcast. Once a programme is downloaded, a user had thirty days to start watching it; after starting to watch, a programme remained available for the next seven days. Using the online streaming service, most programmes became unavailable from the website after seven days.

Criticism was levelled at the iPlayer's use of KService from Kontiki, the peer-to-peer application which continued to use users' bandwidth even after the iPlayer had been shut down. However, the Kontiki P2P system was not used after the new client was introduced in December 2008.

The client offered an electronic programme guide (EPG) with listings for both the previous seven and next seven days' programmes; selecting a programme which had already been broadcast began downloading it immediately, while those not yet shown would be downloaded when available. It was not possible to schedule a series to be automatically downloaded when the next episode becomes available.

==== Online streaming service ====
A screenshot of the old version of BBC iPlayer streaming page for television programme, Sound

The BBC's streaming version of the iPlayer, using Adobe Flash software, was launched on 13 December 2007. The BBC made use of the Christmas period to trumpet the new service with the tagline 'Making the unmissable... unmissable', and the service came out of beta on 25 December 2007. Also, seasonal specials were followed routinely throughout the Christmas week with plugs for the iPlayer. The streaming version of the iPlayer offered replays of programmes broadcast on all national BBC TV channels and S4C during the last seven days. Due to licensing agreements, all international and some privately produced TV shows and movies are not available on the iPlayer.

=== 'iPlayer 2.0' ===
On 25 June 2008, the BBC announced that they had been developing a new version of the iPlayer based on user feedback – it was then called "BBC iPlayer 2.0". New features included combining the normal television iPlayer with the radio iPlayer, schedules of programmes due to be on the iPlayer, automatic resumption of the last programme watched, an increase in the size of the screen by 25% to 640 pixels wide, RSS feeds of iPlayer data, and a "Yesterday's TV" function. The beta ran alongside the existing site until 3 July 2008, when a new version replaced it. Later versions have implemented an option of streaming videos in high quality in H.264.

A special version of the BBC iPlayer was launched on 19 December 2008. It was designed for children aged 6 to 12, allowing them to choose from series such as Blue Peter, M.I. High, The Sarah Jane Adventures and more (non-children's programming is restricted).

==== BBC iPlayer Desktop Manager ====
At the end of 2008, a newer platform was launched which facilitated use of the new BBC iPlayer Desktop (replacement for Download Manager) and other "BBC iPlayer Labs" features such as adjustable video windows and user feedback options. In March 2009, the BBC launched a streaming version of the player which needs a 1500 kbit/s minimum connection.

On 1 April 2010, this Desktop Manager was updated to version 1.5.15695.18135. The update claimed, amongst other things, optimisation of CPU usage in full screen: 20% to 40% improvement; videos that start to download in the UK should be able to complete downloading abroad; and update to use Adobe Integrated Runtime AIR 1.5.3 which has improved reliability, compatibility and security.

=== 'iPlayer 3.0' ===
The iPlayer team released the next generation of the iPlayer, calling it the iPlayer 3.0 release, on 6 September 2010. It brought integration with various social networking sites to the TV on-demand service, through deals with Facebook, Twitter, Reddit, Delicious, Digg and StumbleUpon.

BBC ID was also added to allow users to access their iPlayer settings from a variety of devices and Favourite shows so the users get notified when new episodes of their favourited shows are available.

The only other feature of the new-look iPlayer discussed was a new embeddable video player, being rolled out across the whole of the BBC's online presence. On 19 June 2012 on the live TV channels, it added a rewind to start button.

The BBC reported iPlayer users had technical problems with the release of Adobe AIR 3.5, and another with Google Chrome.

=== iPlayer Downloads ===
In 2013, the iPlayer Desktop application was replaced with the simpler iPlayer Downloads application, from which some features were dropped, for example, live streaming.

In February 2024, the BBC announced they would be closing the iPlayer Downloads application – ending downloads for users on desktop or laptop computers. Programmes would still be available for streaming or download on tablets or phones.

=== 'The New BBC iPlayer' ===
On 11 March 2014, the BBC introduced a new version of their iPlayer service called 'The New BBC iPlayer'. This new version included a new user interface, and uses the BBC's new 'responsive design,' which means the iPlayer can be used on different screen sizes without building separate versions. There is a new home screen along with new channel pages that also use the same responsive design that the rest of the BBC sites now use. The BBC ID is still used to track favourites across the site (however, favourites have now been moved to a whole page rather than an individual bar), and new categories have been generated to expand the amount of programmes that can be found by the 42% of visitors who arrive to the iPlayer service without a particular programme in mind. The new pop-out radio player has removed the option to select either high or low bit-rate, which may impact users with a data download cap. It no longer restores the volume level or play point from the previous session.

The iPlayer introduced an Ultra HD trial, allowing users with an Ultra HD device to watch with greater picture detail. From December 2016 to January 2017, this was being used to show a 4-minute clip of Planet Earth II in 4K. Other BBC shows, such as His Dark Materials (which was also filmed in this format), could also be streamed on iPlayer in Ultra HD. However, the iPlayer including the UHD material does not support surround sound/5.1 audio and only supports stereo sound, even when 5.1 audio has been broadcast (e.g., The Proms).

In early 2016, regional opt-outs for 15 English regions were introduced so regional programming could be watched live.

== Television platforms ==
=== BT Vision ===
On 27 May 2008, BT began to charge BT Vision customers £3 per month for watching BBC Replay, a cut-down version of the iPlayer offering a more limited 30 hours of BBC programming per week. A spokesman for BT said that its customers had previously been able to view only BBC on-demand content because of "technical issues". A BBC spokesman said: "In line with other TV platforms where BBC programmes are made available on demand, the BBC requires that all public service content should be accessible via the lowest cost subscription tier. In this case, it is BT Replay."

From 1 April 2009, the Replay package was included in all of BT Vision's Value Packs but remained available as a separate, £2.93 per month, package to non-subscribers.

On 11 November 2010, the BBC and BT announced plans to bring the full iPlayer package to BT Vision, replacing the BBC content on BT Vision's 50-hour "TV Replay" package. BT introduced the iPlayer in a phased release, starting in early December 2010, with all BT Vision customers able to access the service on channel 990 by 22 June 2011.

=== Digital media receivers ===
iPlayer downloaded TV programmes can be streamed to televisions via the NetGear EVA8000 and Linksys DMA2200 digital media receivers, through PCs running Windows XP or Vista, with Windows Media Center installed.

=== FetchTV ===
On 23 July 2009, the first subscription-free digital terrestrial device to include the iPlayer went on sale in UK retailers. The FetchTV Smartbox connects to any broadband connection and gives access to the iPlayer and is a Freeview+ PVR.

FetchTV created its own version of the iPlayer, believing it was adhering to BBC guidelines, but support was refused by BBC Future Media and Technology. IP Vision made a formal complaint to the BBC in March 2009: the matter then passed to the BBC Executive's Fair Trading Complaints Panel, which rejected the complaint, and IP Vision then appealed to the BBC Trust. On 22 December 2009, the BBC Trust rejected FetchTV's request to release the product. The Trust's Finance and Compliance Committee (FCC) found that the BBC had given reasonable arguments as to why IP Vision should not be allowed to go ahead with its self-build product.

The Trust FCC also rescinded new guidelines introduced by the BBC in October 2009, formalising a ban on third parties building their own commercial iPlayer products. The Trust concluded that the clarification amounted to a significant change to the syndication guidelines which should have been referred to the Trust for approval before publication.

=== Freesat ===
BBC iPlayer as displayed by Freesat

On 2 November 2009, it was announced that a beta release of the iPlayer for Freesat would be released on 7 December 2009 to a limited number of Freesat viewers. On 21 December 2009, the iPlayer was made available on a soft launch to Freesat viewers with Humax Foxsat HD receivers only, with an official release on 11 January 2010. It is the final beta version of the iPlayer, available via the red button on interactive page 7001. On 20 January 2010, Sony released software update 1.630SA to enable the iPlayer on all of their Freesat-integrated televisions.

On 25 March 2010, the iPlayer was added to TechniSat receivers, with an update for Harvard International receivers released on 31 March. However, the Harvard upgrade will not be available on early model standard definition Freesat receivers sold under the Bush, Goodmans and Grundig brands. Harvard International is therefore offering a replacement high-definition receiver to anyone affected. Panasonic had aimed to add the iPlayer to all of its devices by October 2010, but support was only extended to the 2008 range in September 2011. LG have been unable to update their Freesat integrated LF7700 television and were offering a free Freesat set-top box; however, this promotional goodwill gesture ended after 6 months. On 16 December 2010, the iPlayer was assigned to Freesat channel 901, in addition to access via the BBC Red Button.

=== Freeview ===
On 4 May 2009, the managing director of Freeview, Ilse Howling, announced expectations that iPlayer-enabled Freeview boxes would be available in 2009. From 1 April 2011, all new Freeview HD receiver products must include MHEG Interaction Channel (MHEG-IC) as part of D-Book 6.2.1. The move allowed the standard MHEG-5 reliant iPlayer application to be offered from 7 April via the red button on all BBC channels to Freeview HD certified devices.

=== Roku ===
On 10 February 2012, Roku launched their streaming devices in the UK for the first time, with the iPlayer available from launch. On 26 July 2013, Now TV released a Now TV-branded Roku streaming box, including the iPlayer app.

=== Sky ===
On 30 January 2012, it was announced that iPlayer would be added to Sky's On Demand service, arriving on 30 October 2012. The launch reduced the amount paid by the BBC for its carriage on Sky by up to 30%, following the introduction of a clause in BSkyB's Published Price List which reduces the amount paid by a public service broadcaster when one of its channels offers on demand programming to Sky receivers. The iPlayer via Sky requires a subscription to Sky TV channels or to Sky+ and a Sky+ HD box with an internet connection.

=== Televisions and Blu-ray players ===
In December 2009, Cello Electronics released the Marks & Spencer branded iViewer TV. The television is internet enabled, allowing for the viewing of online content including the iPlayer, which has its own physical button on the remote, although the iPlayer HD wasn't available until 2010.

On 11 January 2010, the BBC announced that the iPlayer would be built directly into TVs that would be widely available in the UK within months. Samsung Electronics became the first major manufacturer to officially announce that its televisions would be updated to include full access to the iPlayer. An iPlayer app is available to download from Samsung Apps for Samsung Smart TV.

Sony added the iPlayer to its BRAVIA Internet Video service, included in its 2010 range of televisions and Blu-ray players. On 9 September 2010, the iPlayer was added to Sony's BRAVIA televisions, having previously only been available on Blu-ray players. Televisions needed a firmware update which could be upgraded over the internet or downloaded onto a USB flash drive for loading directly to the TV. At the time of launch, BBC HD content is not available, though high and standard video quality are available on all programmes.

LG webOS smart TVs come pre installed with the BBC iPlayer app and can be downloaded from the LG content store.

=== Virgin Media ===
On 30 April 2008, the iPlayer service was fed directly to Virgin Media's 3.4m digital cable TV customers as part of the company's video-on-demand service. Pressing the 'red button' while watching a BBC channel on TV will bring up the iPlayer service without the user having to access the web.

On 29 May 2008, Virgin Media successfully integrated the iPlayer with the Virgin Media electronic programme guide. Most BBC shows are now listed alongside other VOD content in Virgin's Catch Up TV section and through the red button while viewing a BBC channel. There is no charge for watching BBC shows through the iPlayer on Virgin Media.

As of 21 July 2008, the iPlayer on Virgin Media had received 10.5 million views since its official launch on 1 June 2008. On 26 September 2008 it was revealed that one-third of all iPlayer programme views were accessed through Virgin Media.

On 1 May 2009, the BBC and Virgin Media announced the launch of HD content via the iPlayer on Virgin Media's TV platform, including Robin Hood, Friday Night with Jonathan Ross and Later... with Jools Holland.

On 2 March 2011, Virgin released an iPlayer application for their TiVo digital video recorder. Unlike the previous implementation, the application streams over the internet rather than utilising Virgin's video-on-demand service, to comply with the BBC's then-proposed syndication policy. The change also allows an increase in the amount of programmes available, from around 300 to 700 hours on average, bringing Virgin into line with the iPlayer on connected TV devices. At the same time, Virgin Media were also forced to remove direct access to BBC content on TiVo, meaning that instead of being able to access BBC content through its EPG, Virgin TiVo users instead had to go through the Apps and Games area or press the Red Button from a BBC channel. This access was reimplemented with the release of TiVo update 15.2 in late 2011, which integrated BBC iPlayer once again into the TiVo search and EPG after new guidelines on syndicated content were published by the BBC Trust.

=== YouView ===
BBC iPlayer was one of four services available at the launch of YouView in July 2012. At launch, the BBC iPlayer app contained options to resume watching recent programmes, access favourites, browse the most popular shows, find similar programmes or more episodes, included integrated search and was the only service to feature HD video.

== Game consoles ==
=== PlayStation 3 ===
Soon after the Wii release, several unofficial PlayStation 3 iPlayer proxy sites arose that used JavaScript to replace the UA string. On 2 December 2008, the BBC provided an official iPlayer application widget for the PS3. Shortly after release, the PS3 accounted for 6% of all iPlayer traffic, making it the third most popular platform used to access the service behind personal computers (85%) and mobile phones and iPods (7%). By January 2010, PS3 usage had risen to 8%, and by November 2010, over 6 million people accessed the iPlayer through the PlayStation 3.

In September 2009, the PS3 iPlayer was updated with H.264 playback and full-screen content. Future plans for the PS3 iPlayer include features from iPlayer V3 scheduled for late 2010. On 8 August 2011, the application was updated and now includes access to BBC HD; however, most content remains unavailable to PS3 users due to DRM restrictions.

The PS3 iPlayer was withdrawn from October 2020 as part of a BBC closure policy for older devices.

=== PlayStation 4 ===
In October 2013, Sony confirmed that the PlayStation 4 would have the BBC iPlayer app. Additionally, they announced that BBC iPlayer would continue to be free to access and would not be part of the PlayStation Plus subscription service.

=== Wii ===
BBC iPlayer as displayed by the Nintendo Wii

On 9 April 2008, the BBC iPlayer was made available to stream video content on the Wii video game console via the Internet Channel. This was enabled by a recoding of the iPlayer to use Flash 7 rather than Flash 9. However, the Autumn 2009 update to the Wii's Internet Channel resulted in the iPlayer no longer working on updated consoles. A BBC iPlayer in the form of a dedicated Wii channel was launched on 18 November 2009. The BBC iPlayer Channel was free to download from the Wii Shop Channel, until 10 February 2015, when the BBC announced on their website that they had removed BBC iPlayer from the Wii Shop Channel and terminated the service on the Wii. The BBC cited their policies in resource management as the reason.

=== Wii U ===
The BBC confirmed that this application was set to be released on Nintendo's Wii U at launch, but due to some issue, it was delayed. In January 2014, the BBC stated that this application is set to appear soon on Wii U. On 11 December 2014, Senior product manager Peter Lasko of BBC stated that they hope this application will come to Wii U in early 2015. Without prior notice, however, the app was eventually released for the Nintendo eShop on the Wii U by 28 May 2015.

On 31 August 2016, only about 15 months after launch, the BBC iPlayer was de-listed from the Nintendo eShop, and the BBC later confirmed terminating the service by 16 January 2017 for those who already downloaded the app on the Wii U. The BBC cited the end in the licence agreement between them and Nintendo UK as the reason.

=== Xbox 360 ===
The BBC and Microsoft had been unable to reach a deal to add the iPlayer to the Xbox 360 for a number of years because Microsoft's strategy of charging for all content on its Xbox Live platform is incompatible with the BBC's public service remit. Microsoft wanted to ensure that only those paying for Xbox Live Gold accounts could access its added content services. The BBC is not legally allowed to charge the UK public for access to the iPlayer, as the access charges for it are included in the BBC licence fee already.

In October 2011, it was announced that the BBC content would be made available to all Xbox Live members in the UK, including Xbox Live Free members. On 20 March 2012, BBC iPlayer became available on Xbox Live; the service includes Kinect functionality.

Support for the iPlayer on the Xbox 360 was terminated on 27 March 2019.

=== Xbox One ===
In October 2013, Microsoft confirmed that the Xbox One would have the BBC iPlayer app. However, despite Microsoft's claim that the BBC iPlayer app would be available for Xbox One from launch day in the UK, it was not. The BBC commented in December 2013, saying: "BBC iPlayer is already available to audiences on over 1,000 devices and platforms in the UK. Whilst we are working to bring BBC iPlayer to Xbox One in the future, we have no further details to share at this time."

In January 2014, a report by a BBC programmer announced that an issue with the Kinect sensor had caused the app's delay. He added that all Xbox One apps have to offer gesture and voice controls, as well as Snap features and media achievements. In August 2014, the BBC reported on its blog that they were aiming to release BBC iPlayer on Xbox One by the end of 2014.

On 4 December 2014, BBC iPlayer was released on the console.

=== PlayStation 5 ===
BBC iPlayer was released on PlayStation 5 on 30 November 2021.

== Mobile platforms ==
=== Android devices ===
On 23 June 2010, after many months of complaints from Android users, BBC iPlayer officially announced support for the Android platform. Users can navigate to the usual BBC iPlayer website, and a mobile website is displayed. As a result of the BBC's decision to use Adobe Flash Player to handle video playback for Android devices on this website, users must be using Android 2.2 or later (the earliest Android version supported by Flash Player).

There was also an unofficial but functional application for the Google Android platform called myPlayer, but all BBC content was removed in November 2010 as the service was alleged to be in breach of the BBC terms of use. Another such application – beebPlayer – was removed from the market in May 2010 at the BBC's request.

On 8 February 2011, the BBC announced that Android, alongside the iPad, would be amongst the first two platforms to receive a native iPlayer application. The application was made available via the Android Market to UK users, but as with the earlier mobile website, the application uses Adobe's Flash Player for video playback and as a result is only available for devices running Android 2.2 to 4.0 since Android 4.1 does not support Flash Player.

On 4 September 2012, the BBC posted on their internet blog that Android users would soon be able to download programmes using the BBC iPlayer app.

On 19 September 2012, the BBC reported that an Adobe AIR-based iPlayer application had been developed for Android 4.1, as well as earlier versions. The application, named BBC Media Player, is intended to permit continued iPlayer support for the Android platform.

=== BlackBerry devices ===
On 5 November 2010, an official BBC iPlayer app that allows users to stream live television and radio, and catch up on previously aired content became available for download on BlackBerry OS 5.0 (and higher) devices. A Wi-Fi connection is needed for an "optimal viewing experience" but 3 and Vodafone are allowing it run on their 3G networks.

=== iOS devices ===
On 7 March 2008, a beta version for Apple's iOS devices (iPhone, iPod Touch, and later iPad) was released, allowing streaming over a Wi-Fi connection. An update released on 12 December 2011 allowed streaming over 3G. On 4 September 2012, an update provided the ability to download programmes for up to 30 days, with a seven-day viewing window. The EDGE connectivity on the iPhone, however, is not supported, as it is too slow for streaming video.

Non-iPhone users were found to be watching and downloading streams intended for iPhone users allowing them to play them on alternative devices. The BBC modified the iPlayer service on 13 March 2008 to prevent this. Through the month of June 2008, further methods were discovered by iPlayer users to watch and download streams intended for iPhones. A Ruby hole was followed by the BBC introducing XOR encryption on parts of the downloaded files if a genuine iPhone was not detected.

The BBC introduced specially crafted web bugs, referrer checks and download chunk limits, such that only devices exhibiting this behaviour, i.e. a genuine iPhone handset, would be able to stream the video content. A cycle of updates and reverse engineering has followed such that all the various streams, both for the iPhone and Flash streaming service, are now able to be downloaded without the need for decryption or DRM circumvention. This has been made possible by various software which can effectively simulate a RTMP Flash client or an iPhone. In early December 2010, the iPhone MP3 access was being changed to use HTTPS. The server checks the client's certificate and only accepts connections for those issued to Apple. This change to the protocol not only prevents access to non-Apple devices but also disables use by a number of early-generation iPod Touch devices.

On 28 July 2011, BBC Worldwide released an international version of the iPlayer for the iPad. A UK version of the iPlayer for iPad app was also launched; however, this version only allowed streaming video and did not allow any offline viewing. In December 2011, the iPlayer app was extended to work with the iPhone and iPod Touch.

=== Nokia N96 phone ===
On 18 September 2008, the BBC announced that a version would become available to the Nokia N96 mobile phone as a download service to allow viewers to watch programmes even when they are out of reach of Wi-Fi or 3G networks. The launch date was set of 1 October 2008.

Shortly after on 9 September 2008, even before the BBC Nokia N96 download service had gone live, a method was published to independently download and play the iPlayer N96 3GP stream on other mobiles, Linux and macOS.

=== Windows Phone ===
BBC Released BBC iPlayer app on Windows Phone 8 devices on 15 May 2013 as a mobile wrapper UI. Available on the Windows Phone Store.

=== Additional mobile devices ===
In early December 2008, iPlayer was updated to include streaming radio and television, and extended to a variety of handsets including Nokia 5800 XpressMusic, Nokia N8, Samsung Omnia, Sony Ericsson C905, Sony Ericsson XPERIA X1 and Sony Ericsson W995.

== BBC Store ==
BBC Store, codenamed Project Barcelona, launched in the UK and opened the archive to consumers and allowed users to buy a show and download it. BBC Store was approved by the BBC Trust in 2014 and the store launched in 2015. It was initially hosted on a dedicated website but later integrated with BBC iPlayer. BBC Store closed in 2017, but is still available in the United States.

== Reception and adoption ==
Before the launch in December 2007, the BBC had hoped the service would reach half a million users in its first six months. This turned out to be a gross underestimate, as 3.5 million programmes were streamed or downloaded in the first three weeks alone. The Guardian described these figures as "remarkably promising".

In its first year, 2008, growth continued at an impressive rate. By April, the iPlayer accounted for around five per cent of all UK Internet traffic, and had approximately five million page views per day by June. In December, it was announced that more than 180 million programmes have been watched on iPlayer since its release. During the BAFTAs in May, the iPlayer won the "Interactive Innovation Service/Platform" Award, beating Channel 4's 'Big Art Mob' and the Bebo 'Open Media Platform'. The streaming of programmes forms the lion's share of the success, outnumbering downloads eight to one in January 2008, and 97:3 in October 2009.

In the month of October 2009, it was revealed that the site experienced 70 million requests and transferred seven petabytes of data. Television formed about two-thirds of all requests, with radio making up the rest. Most TV was streamed from pre-recorded footage, whereas live streaming was preferred of radio. Eighty-five per cent of requests were from computers, with much of the rest coming from iPods, iPhones and PS3s (from a total of 15 platforms). The most popular TV programme of 2009 was Top Gear, and the most popular radio was that reporting The Ashes.

The success of the iPlayer may be down to a "long tail" effect, with users seeking out niche programmes; programmes broadcast on digital channels are doing remarkably well. However, this is expected to change with the introduction of booking programmes to download in advance and automatic downloading of the next episode.

In 2008, the bandwidth use of iPlayer was met with some concern and criticism from UK ISPs. Several ISPs, notably Tiscali, called on the BBC to partially fund network upgrades to cope with iPlayer traffic. The BBC responded by saying that the iPlayer was driving demand for broadband subscriptions.

By May 2010, the site was getting 123 million monthly play requests. The service was being used by 40 per cent of online adults in the UK by March 2012.

=== DRM criticism ===
During the 2005 and 2006 iPlayer trials, the digital rights management (DRM) system used was based on Microsoft's Windows Media DRM, which led to concerns about cross-platform availability, as this technology is available only for Windows XP. However, some users have managed to get it working using compatibility options in Microsoft's Windows Vista. The BBC emphasises that it "has a commitment to platform neutrality and a remit to make its content as widely available as possible", and that while the initial trial used a Microsoft-based technology, they are constantly looking for new technologies which would enable them to relax the restriction: Ashley Highfield, then BBC's director of Future Media and Technology, explained that "we have always started with the platform that reaches the most people and then rolled it out from there". They also point out that not all of the content delivered through the iPlayer will be subject to DRM – live streaming content, for instance, may not need the same level of control, presumably implying that players for OS X and Linux systems could be developed with a restricted range of content. However, a project was started to enable the iPlayer to work with other platforms via the Wine project. Streaming via the BBC iPlayer website is now available in all browsers supporting Adobe Flash. Also, iPlayer Desktop, which allowed downloading programmes for later offline viewing, was available for Windows, macOS and Linux until 2024.

On 14 August 2007, the Free Software Foundation staged a demonstration outside BBC Television Centre. The FSF's Peter T. Brown criticised the BBC for what he claimed was a break from previous tradition: the insistence that, for the first time, BBC viewers would be forced to use proprietary technology to watch BBC programmes.

On 18 February 2010, the BBC updated iPlayer with an SWF verification layer which attempts to close the door on open source implementations of Real Time Messaging Protocol (RTMP) streaming. The attempt was unsuccessful, with most existing open source applications remaining capable of playing or downloading RTMP content from the iPlayer.

=== Programme removal ===
BBC iPlayer occasionally removes or withdraws programmes that are not in line with its editorial guidelines or public service standards, particularly in response to concerns about impartiality or sensitivity. In February 2022, the programme The Crypto-Millionaire—a documentary about a self-made cryptocurrency entrepreneur from Birmingham, planned as part of the We Are England series—was pulled from BBC iPlayer just hours before its scheduled release due to reported "editorial issues". In February 2025, the programme Gaza: How to Survive a Warzone was removed from BBC iPlayer after it emerged that the child narrator and his family had links to Hamas. The BBC issued an apology, acknowledging "serious flaws" in the production of the programme.

== Overseas availability ==
BBC TV productions are paid for by the UK television licence fee and rights agreements with third parties. Thus, all BBC iPlayer TV programmes are accessible from IP addresses allocated to the UK only, as of 2026. However, most radio programmes can be accessed globally, with the exception of a few programmes, mainly sports broadcasts, that are affected by rights issues.

An international version of the iPlayer was launched on 28 July 2011 in eleven western European countries, after receiving the approval of the BBC Trust in November 2010. The international iPlayer takes the form of an iPad application which offers a limited amount of free content, supported by pre-roll ads and sponsorship, but its core business model is subscription (subscription costs approximately £5.00 per month). The global iPlayer app includes some features that are not in the UK version, including the ability to stream shows over 3G as well as Wi-Fi, and a downloading feature to store programmes on one's mobile device for offline viewing. At launch, 1,500 hours of content was made available, of which 60% had been produced and commissioned by the BBC, while 30% had been commissioned by the BBC but produced by independents. The other 10% was entirely non-BBC content, including ITV's Primeval, and Channel 4's The Naked Chef and Misfits. Launches in Australia and Canada followed by the end of 2011 as part of what was intended to be a one-year pilot.

Although US availability was also anticipated in 2011, an American launch date was never announced. Reports from the summer of 2012 claimed that American cable providers threatened to drop BBC America if the iPlayer, which duplicates much of the content on the cable channel, were made available in the US market. In a statement on the difficulties facing the US rollout, the BBC's Head of Communications for Global iPlayer Tessa Matchett said: "The United States is a very complex media market. Currently, we have one very successful cable channel in BBC America, and we’re looking into what options we have to roll out additional platforms in that country." In May 2015, it was announced that the global iPlayer service would be discontinued.

In early 2016, BBC Worldwide launched a version of the iPlayer service in Singapore, rebranded as BBC Player. The service is only available to Starhub subscribers who have subscribed to the BBC channels package in Singapore. The service was extended into Malaysia in 2017; however, the service can only be accessed by UniFi subscribers who have signed up for the Jumbo pack on Hypp.TV. Access for Streamyx subscribers with the same Hypp.TV package was added a few months later.

In March 2017, BBC Worldwide, as part of a joint venture with ITV plc, and BBC America co-owner AMC Networks, launched a new U.S. subscription video-on-demand service known as BritBox.

== Humour ==
In 2009, the BBC's April Fools' joke was a press release announcing the availability of the iPlayer on a specialised toaster, supposedly for users to watch breakfast television.

The volume control of the iPlayer goes up to 11, apparently a nod to a scene about an amplifier volume control that goes up to eleven in the rock mockumentary This Is Spinal Tap (1984).

== See also ==
- U
- BBC Radio Explorer
- BBC Select (streaming service)
- BBC Three (streaming service)
- List of streaming media services
