= YouView =

British hybrid television platform

YouView TV Ltd
- Formerly: Canvas Pro Tem Limited (July–September 2010)
- Type: Limited company
- Industry: Television broadcasting
- Predecessor: Project Canvas
- Founded: 16 September 2010; 16 years ago in London, England
- Founder: BT Group; BBC; ITV
- Headquarters: London, England
- Area served: United Kingdom
- Key people: Simon Duffy, Chairman
- Products: Television software; Set-top boxes
- Services: IPTV; Electronic programme guide; Video on demand; Digital video recording
- Owner: BT Group; TalkTalk Group; Arqiva; BBC; ITV; Channel 4; 5
- Website: youview.com

YouView TV Ltd is a British media company, a partnership of four broadcasters: the BBC, ITV, Channel 4 and 5; and two telecommunications operators, BT Group and TalkTalk Group (formerly also Arqiva). It launched in 2012 the hybrid television platform named YouView, which was formed from an ambitious project between the UK's four terrestrial broadcasters originally titled Project Canvas.

The YouView service was developed as an open platform to combine free-to-air digital terrestrial television (DTT) channels from Freeview using an aerial connection, with TV on demand ("catch-up TV") services using a broadband internet connection, without any subscription. YouView PVR set-top boxes have been sold at retail or built into certain Sony Bravia TV sets. The software has most notably been used by BT and TalkTalk for use on their subscription services BT TV, Plusnet TV, and TalkTalk TV.

Though originally intending to compete against Freeview and Freesat, YouView as an independent retail product struggled to take off, with BT and TalkTalk becoming its main beneficiaries. This led to the broadcasters launching the similar Freeview Play platform in 2015. In recent years, YouView has streamlined itself and has worked with both BT and TalkTalk to support their IPTV platforms while the broadcasters have since come together as Everyone TV. In December 2023, YouView said it was working with Everyone TV to help launch the new Freely service.

== Content ==
The YouView hardware is a digital terrestrial television DVB-T2 HD set-top box that provides viewing and recording of all free-to-air channels available on digital terrestrial television in the United Kingdom. There is no access to some streamed channels in the 225–256 range on Freeview, as YouView lacks support for the MHEG-5 integration channel used by these channels to provide them over IP.

Additional content is provided over a broadband internet connection, with channels that can be viewed and recorded in the same way as the free-to-air channels and can also be accessed via the YouView menu and EPG via the search function. On demand players vary as rentals, on demand, subscription and catch-up (correct as of 2020):

- BBC iPlayer (catch-up)
- ITVX (catch-up)
- STV Player (catch-up)
- Channel 4 (catch-up & on-demand)
- 5 (catch-up)
- Milkshake! (catch-up)
- BritBox (part of ITVX Premium since the closure of the standalone service on 30 April 2024)
- Pop Player (catch-up)
- Ketchup TV, Sports Channel Network, YAAAS!, PLANET KNOWLEDGE, On demand 365 (free on-demand players)
- U (catch-up)
- Watch Free UK (catch-up)
- TalkTalk Player (for TalkTalk customers only)
- BT TV Player (for BT customers only)
- NOW (subscription)
- Netflix (subscription)
- Amazon Prime Video (subscription)
- BBC Sounds (catch-up & on-demand radio)
- Sky Store (rental + buy & keep) Since been removed from Youview.

=== YouView from BT ===
BT Infinity subscribers can access additional live IPTV channels via the YouView EPG. Customers who subscribe to BT TV will receive either a YouView+ box (with recording capabilities), or a standard YouView box (no recording capabilities), or a YouView Ultra HD box – depending on the subscription type taken. They can then view on-demand content through the BT TV Player.

=== YouView from Plusnet ===
Plusnet 'Unlimited Fibre' customers could until 2021 subscribe to Plusnet's 'YouView TV from Plusnet' service, with provision through both the full range of available Freeview channels and by channels live-streamed through the Internet (IPTV), in both Standard Definition and High Definition. Subscribers choose either a standard YouView box or YouView+ box, the latter with the ability to pause and rewind live TV, and a recording capacity of up to 150 hours of HD, or 300 hours of SD Freeview, Entertainment and BT Sport Lite channels, which are included as standard. Both boxes also provide access to the 'on demand' players from the main broadcasters: BBC iPlayer, the ITV Hub, All 4 and My 5.

=== YouView from TalkTalk ===
A free YouView box is provided to TalkTalk Plus or Essentials customers taking out a fixed term contract and allow access to the content previously available from TalkTalk TV. Content that TalkTalk provides, such as film rentals and box sets, are available from the TalkTalk Player application within the YouView menu bar. In the TalkTalk Player, there are 'boosts' that customers can buy for a minimum of one month, and customers can watch and record them from the main guide the same as Freeview channels. These boosts range from Sky premium channels, sports, TV box sets, films, and foreign language channels. TalkTalk use their own brand of Huawei-manufactured boxes, with the TalkTalk logo on the front, a remote control with a direct button on the TalkTalk Player, and a 320 GB hard drive for Plus TV customers. Essentials customers cannot record, but can still pause live TV. Unlike BT, customers do not need a fibre broadband package to access the service.

== Features ==
The original purpose of YouView was to combine web streamed television and traditional television together in one box. The service was initially marketed as those who did not have an existing subscription to Sky, Virgin or BT TV. One of YouView's features is the electronic programming guide (EPG) that can scroll backwards up to 7 days and that integrates directly with the respective channel's catch-up service.

== Technical information ==
On 14 April 2011, YouView published its final core technical specification. The minimum specifications for a YouView-enabled digital terrestrial television (DTT) high-definition (HD) digital video recorder (DVR or PVR) product require:

- Twin DVB-T/DVB-T2 tuners
- Embedded Linux 2.6.23 or later operating system
- Maximum of 26 dB of fan noise
- 4K UHD (Ultra HD) graphics plane
- MPEG-2 and MPEG-4 video
- HDMI 2.1 socket
- TOSLINK optical or coaxial S/PDIF connection
- Up to 5.1 surround sound
- Ethernet port supporting 10BASE-T and 100BASE-TX
- 802.11n wireless network support, integrated, or via a USB adapter
- 950 MHz central processing unit (CPU)
- Two Universal Serial Bus USB 2.0 sockets
- Support for USB mass storage devices

Analogue HD outputs are forbidden as part of the rights management strategy.

== Set-top boxes ==
Set-top boxes available for the YouView service:

- Humax DTR-T1000 (launch date 24 July 2012).
- Humax DTR-T1000 with BT brand (launch date 1 September 2012). This includes the BT brand and an extra menu item "BT Vision".
- Humax DTR-T1010 (launch date 19 March 2013). The functionally and hardware is exactly the same to the previous DTR-T1000 with different appearance.
- Humax DTR-T2000 (launch date 14 June 2014). Minor redesign and slightly smaller than the previous T1010 design.
- Humax DTR-T2100 with BT YouView+ brand (launch date 25 February 2014). Redesign which is significantly smaller and quieter than previous Humax Youview boxes (because power transformer at plug).
- Humax DTR-T2110 with BT YouView+ brand.
- Humax DTR-T2120 with Plusnet YouView+ brand.
- Humax DTR-T4000 with BT YouView+ Ultra HD brand (later marketed as BT TV box).
- Huawei DN360T with TalkTalk brand (launch date 5 March 2013). No recording is available.
- Huawei DN370T with TalkTalk brand (launch date 5 March 2013). Recording is available.
- Huawei DN371T YouView+ (launch date 5 March 2014).
- Huawei DN372T with TalkTalk brand. Recording is available.
- Sagemcom RTIW387 with BT brand (marketed as BT TV Box Pro, launch date 4 June 2021).

Note 1: each YouView box comes in a variety of hard disk storage sizes, and is often designated by ModelNo/StorageSize – e.g. DTR-T1000/500GB

Note 2: The only box that supports Wi-Fi is the Sagemcom RTIW387, all others must connect directly to the router or through power-line adapters.

Note 3: YouView+ has become the designated way to show the set-top box records TV programmes. This is because of services offered by TalkTalk TV.

== History and development ==
Project Canvas was initially announced as a partnership between the BBC, BT and ITV plc, following the failure of Project Kangaroo, a proposed video-on-demand service offering content from BBC Worldwide, ITV.com, and Channel 4's 4oD, which was blocked in February 2009 on competition grounds, and only led to the short lived SeeSaw service. The Project Canvas proposal was published by the BBC a few weeks after Kangaroo's cancellation. Canvas differed from Kangaroo in that it was a proposed TV platform (a device that would deliver internet-connected TV), rather than a video-on-demand service (that would act as a single content portal, much like the music video equivalent VEVO).

On 30 July 2009, Project Canvas announced that Five had signed up to the project. On 9 July 2010, Five announced that it would not pursue further involvement in Project Canvas, pending a review of its digital investment strategy. On 24 August 2010, Five re-joined Project Canvas, following their acquisition by Northern & Shell. On 16 December 2009, Project Canvas announced that Channel 4 and TalkTalk had also signed up to the project. On 22 March 2010 transmission firm Arqiva joined as an equal partner in the project.

On 17 May 2010 the then Project Canvas director Richard Halton said: "We have also put out an invitation for an eighth partner, and we would like a company that can add scale and expertise to the platform. It is a question of finding an organisation that shares the aims of the venture." It was later reported that, EE, the UK operations of Orange and T-Mobile, had decided against joining, after holding advanced discussions.

=== Management ===
On 23 July 2010 Kip Meek was announced as the non-executive chairman of Project Canvas. Meek left YouView on 7 March 2011, and was replaced by Alan Sugar with immediate effect, who was brought on board by Channel 5's Richard Desmond. The move was partly based on his experience with set-top boxes, in particular that of Sky, and partly due to his likely influence in retaining confidence in the various partners. Alan Sugar stepped down as Chairman in March 2013 following a "boardroom bust-up" with Desmond, with TalkTalk group chairman Sir Charles Dunstone taking on the chairmanship as an interim position. In October 2013 Bwin.Party Digital Entertainment chairman Simon Duffy was named as non-executive chairman of YouView on a permanent basis.

=== Development ===
On 13 November 2009, BBC Future Media and Technology director Erik Huggers previewed the work-in-progress user interface that could power the Project Canvas at C21 Media's FutureMedia conference in London. The mock-up of how the Beijing Olympic Games would look on Canvas allowed users to watch highlights instantly, send clips to friends, monitor what's being said on Twitter, access archives at the touch of a button, and use commercial third party applications and services.

Morgan Stanley compiled a creative analysis for BT about the potential impact of Canvas, describing it as "Freeview 2.0". As Canvas was to be an open platform, Stanley's report noted that content providers would no longer need to pay the current sum of around £10m for capacity on digital terrestrial television to reach their target audience.

On 22 March 2010, the Project Canvas partners submitted analysis to the Office of Fair Trading setting out why the proposed Canvas joint venture does not constitute a qualifying merger under the Enterprise Act 2002. On 19 May 2010, the OFT confirmed that it would not investigate Project Canvas over competition issues. As none of the partners were contributing a "pre-existing business" to Project Canvas, the OFT ruled that it "did not have the jurisdiction" to investigate the venture on competition grounds. The OFT stated "Unlike in the Project Kangaroo joint venture which was blocked by the Competition Commission in 2009, it is not proposed that the joint venture partners will contribute any video-on-demand content or other business to [Project] Canvas, and Canvas will have no role in aggregating, marketing or directly retailing any such television content". Project Canvas was formally approved by the BBC Trust in June 2010.

In May 2010 the Financial Times reported that the name YouView was the most likely brand for the service, having been registered as intellectual property (IP) by the group of broadcasters in April. On 16 September 2010 YouView TV Ltd was incorporated, and the product branded under the YouView name. At the same time, Richard Halton was appointed as CEO of YouView TV Ltd, having previously served as programme director for Project Canvas.

On 16 September 2010 a 'Notice of threatened opposition' was filed against YouView with the Intellectual Property Owners Association (IPO). Robin Fry, an intellectual property partner at law firm Beachcroft LLP, said that the site's similarity to YouTube could cause consumers to confuse the two brands. The use of the world 'You', coupled with a capitalised character in the middle of the word, might suggest a connection between the services. If Google did object, it would be highly likely to win any legal action, according to Fry. "Google is involved in litigation all over the world, and would not be frightened of taking action against this trademark. It has a clear interest in protecting its trademarks to stop them being diluted", he said.

Originally slated to launch in 2010, then early 2011, it was announced on 7 February 2011 that YouView would be delayed to 2012 due to technical issues. An "early 2012" launch was also not possible.

On 14 April 2011, YouView announced additional hardware partnerships with Vestel, Pace plc, Huawei, and Manhattan. On 13 May 2011, Technicolor, one of the original set-top-box hardware manufacturing partners decided to withdraw from the project. The six remaining manufacturers at that point were Humax, Huawei, Pace, Manhattan, Vestel, and Cisco.

TalkTalk began running an in-house trial at the beginning of February 2012 to prepare for the launch. YouView formally launched on 4 July 2012, just in time for the London 2012 Olympics.

=== Regulatory approval and controversy ===
Following the BBC's proposal in February 2009, there have been comments by a number of organisations and companies which have been published by the BBC in a 392-page document. The BBC Trust reached its provisional conclusions following more than 800 written responses, green lit in December 2009.

On 25 June 2010, the BBC Trust gave final approval to the BBC's involvement in Project Canvas, stipulating a number of conditions. The Trust concluded that Project Canvas will deliver significant public value for licence fee payers, and that the Trust shall review the BBC's involvement in Canvas against the conditions of its approval, twelve months after launch of Canvas to consumers. The Digital TV Group (DTG) welcomed the decision and announced it would work with the partners and DTG members to develop the UK specification for Connected TV devices and services to form the 7th edition of the DTG D-Book.

==== Objections to the approval ====
A spokesman for Virgin Media said: "We are disappointed the BBC Trust has approved Canvas and ignored the significant concerns raised by the commercial sector about the proposal. Our position on this matter remains unchanged. As it stands, Canvas will severely restrict competition and innovation and ultimately this will harm consumers". A spokesman for British Sky Broadcasting (BSkyB) said: "The BBC's involvement in Canvas is an unnecessary use of public funds. The BBC Trust's announcement is a predictable decision from a body that has shown little inclination to think independently or set meaningful boundaries on the BBC's activities".

The UK's Intellect Technology Association, said in a submission to the BBC Trust that Project Canvas risks isolating the UK as a "technological island" in a global market by trying to create a standard IPTV set-top box for just the UK.

BSkyB continuously strongly criticised the project funding, saying that public money will be used to give public service broadcasters a foothold in the valuable IPTV, to the disadvantage of "the private sector". It was reported BSkyB was likely to raise state aid complaints if it appears that the BBC is shouldering the costs of developing the venture for its partners. Sky estimated that it would lose four per cent of revenue as a result of the project.

On 4 March 2010, The Daily Telegraph learned that Neil Berkett, Virgin Media's chief executive, would tell the Cable Congress in Brussels "the BBC Trust's consultation has been a shameless whitewash that contravenes almost every principle of good regulation." Berkett objected to proposals to force all broadcasters to use a single 'Project Canvas' brand controlled by the BBC and its partners, which he claimed would have penalised commercial rivals. On 28 April 2010, Neil Berkett confirmed that Virgin Media had made a submission to the Office of Fair Trading over Project Canvas, stating "Canvas needs to be an open platform but it is closed and will require a [second] dedicated set-top box." He added that he considered it a misuse of the licence fee to create a product that was not accessible to all the public. "It is funded by the BBC licence fee and should be available everywhere, on a Virgin Box, a PS3 and even a Sky box.".

On 14 June 2010, Neil Berkett revealed to The Guardian that "Far from trying to block the development of these open standards, we have offered to work commercially with Canvas to explore mutually beneficial ways in which we could incorporate them as a self-contained service in the next generation of Virgin Media set-top boxes."

==== Ofcom complaints ====
On 3 August 2010, Virgin Media lodged a complaint with Ofcom claiming that Project Canvas is anti-competitive.

On 18 August 2010, IP Vision formally complained to Ofcom, calling on the regulator to examine the impact Project Canvas would have on innovation, competition and consumer choice. IP Vision is challenging the validity of Project Canvas, under the 1998 Competition Act.

On 30 August 2010, Six TV, the largest holder of analogue television restricted service licences in the UK (none of which are in use), announced that it would formally request a full Ofcom investigation of Canvas, warning that it could be a "poison pill" for regional broadcasters. Six TV will also submit its complaint regarding Canvas – which includes broader concerns regarding anti-competitive practices affecting digital television transmission in the UK – to the Office of Fair Trading. Six TV also intends to lobby communications minister Ed Vaizey. On 9 September 2010, United For Local TV an umbrella group which represents five local broadcasters with restricted service licenses (including Six TV), asked Ofcom to investigate the Project Canvas connected-TV venture on competition grounds.

On 13 September 2010, the Open Source Consortium, the UK trade body for organisations working in Open Source Software, submitted a formal objection to Ofcom asking it to investigate the project. In its submission to the media regulator, the OSC said that Canvas will have "adverse consequences" for the device and software sector by "diminishing consumer choice and causing inevitable consumer harm".

On 24 September 2010, ISBA – the trade body representing advertisers, joined a growing list of parties asking Ofcom to investigate YouView. ISBA director of media and advertising Bob Wootton believed that the project could represent a "quasi-monopoly". Wootton also claimed that the BBC Trust's recent consultation on Canvas/YouView was "insufficient" for a platform that would carry advertising.

On 28 September 2010, Electra Entertainment – a UK-based IPTV service provider, complained to media regulator Ofcom that YouView would "damage" the UK's interactive TV sector. Electra at the time developed an IPTV platform called Trove which brought media services to the TV screen through Tesco-branded Freeview set top boxes. Electra believes that "the proposed vision, shareholder structure and aims of YouView are anti-competitive and significantly damage the UK interactive TV market".

On 13 October 2010, British Sky Broadcasting submitted a last-minute complaint to Ofcom and the Office of Fair Trading. News of Sky's move prompted an angry reaction from the YouView chief executive, Richard Halton, "While we welcome justifiable scrutiny, the timing of this submission is clearly designed to extend the regulatory process in pursuit of commercial self-interest rather than the public interest".

On 19 October 2010, Ofcom announced that it would not open an investigation into Project Canvas (YouView) under the Competition Act following complaints made by Virgin Media and IPVision. The regulator said that it is "premature" to open an investigation into YouView, as "whether or not YouView and its partners will harm competition in the ways alleged will depend upon how this emerging market develops and how they act, particularly in relation to providing access to content and issuing technical standards".

== See also ==
- Freeview Play
- Kangaroo (video on demand)
- Hybrid Broadcast Broadband TV
- Smart TV
