= Channel 4 (VoD service) =

UK video on demand service

- Logo used from April 2023
- Developer: Channel Four Television Corporation
- Release: November 16, 2006; 19 years ago
- Platform: List: Channel4.com; Virgin Media; YouView including BT TV and TalkTalk TV; Sky; Freeview Play; Roku; Amazon Fire TV; PlayStation 4 & 5; iOS, iPadOS & tvOS; Apple TV; Android; Android TV; Chromecast; IPTV; Freesat; webOS; Xbox 360, Xbox One & Xbox Series X/S; Now
- Available in: English
- Type: Television catch-up
- Website: www.channel4.com

Channel 4 (previously 4oD and All 4) is a video on demand service from Channel Four Television Corporation, free of charge for most content and funded by advertising. The service is available in the UK and Ireland; viewers are not required to have a TV licence—required for live viewing and the BBC iPlayer on-demand service—when watching on-demand services.

The service offers a variety of programmes recently shown on Channel 4, E4, More4, Film4 and E4 Extra and shorts, alongside exclusive content. However some programmes and movies are not available due to rights issues. The service was originally available without registration, but free registration was later required. The service is available without advertising (except for live viewing) on payment of a subscription, under the name Channel 4+ (previously All 4+).

The service launched on 16 November 2006 as 4oD (for "4 on Demand"). 4oD generated around 215 million long-form video views on all platforms where it is available in the first half of 2011, making Channel 4 the biggest commercial UK broadcaster in the video on-demand market during the period. On 30 March 2015, 4oD was merged into and renamed All 4. On 28 February 2019, All 4 was rebranded with a new logo, website design and app design. On 17 April 2023, All 4 rebranded as Channel 4, becoming the "first UK broadcaster to adopt one brand identity across its digital and linear channels".

== Web platforms ==
=== Channel4.com ===
Channel 4, formerly 4oD and All 4, is the main source of on demand programmes from Channel 4, E4, and More4. The catch up service currently lasts 30 days, and the archive has thousands of hours of programming.

By April 2009, 4oD was fully available to Mac and Windows users with Adobe Flash Player installed.

The "catch-up" service offers content free of charge for 30 days after a programme's broadcast on Channel 4. As of 2011, not all content is available to Irish users, due to licensing restrictions; however, the majority of the programming is available. Live streaming of Channel 4 and its sister channels is not available outside the UK.

Channel 4 relaunched 4oD on 31 August 2011. At the heart of the changes is 'My 4oD', allowing registered users to build playlists, schedule shows, maintain a record of what they have watched, save their favourites in a single place, and receive in-page reminders from Channel 4 whenever a new episode is available for them to watch. Other features include better full-page viewing and optimised site navigation during viewing.

=== Other providers of Channel 4 content ===
==== Amazon Instant Video ====
Amazon Instant Video has a content deal with Channel 4, giving its members streaming access to Channel 4's archive in a specially branded Channel 4 collection.

==== Blinkbox ====
Blinkbox previously acquired licenses for a number of programmes to be accessed on its website. Some TV series are available free of charge, such as Balls of Steel, Embarrassing Bodies, Shameless UK, and Skins, while others, for example ER, Shameless US, and The Big Bang Theory, are charged for.

==== Netflix ====
Netflix bought the rights to a number of Channel 4 shows, such as Father Ted, The IT Crowd, and The Inbetweeners, which were shown without adverts.

==== YouTube ====
4oD launched on YouTube in the UK in late 2009, with seven genre-dedicated channels for 4oD additional to separate channels Channel 4 and E4. However, it was announced on 7 January 2014 that Channel 4 had removed all its long-form programming from YouTube in order to focus on the 4oD platform itself, although programming from 4Shorts and Mashed would remain available. On 11 May 2022, Channel 4 announced that a select amount of shows would be made available on YouTube and selected programmes would be made available on YouTube 30 days after being broadcast on Channel 4 and E4.

=== Third party "box-set" content ===
During 2020 Channel 4 entered a new licensing deal with the Walt Disney Company for distributing a variety of older 20th Century Fox programming as part of All 4's expanding "box set" feature. In June, Buffy the Vampire Slayer was introduced, followed by Angel in September 2020, and Malcolm in the Middle in October 2020.

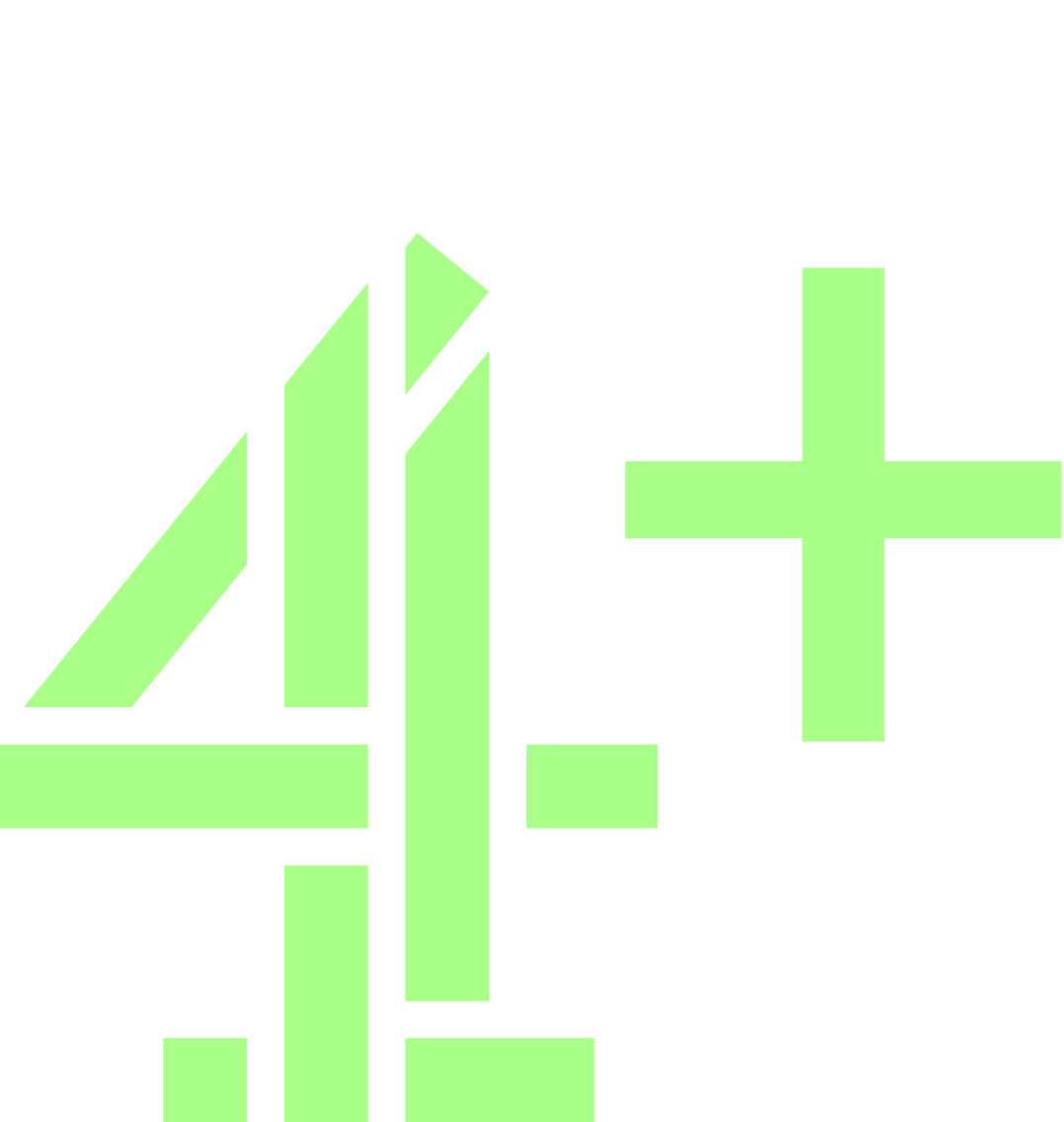
The logo used for Channel 4+, since April 2023

In January 2026 it was announced that Channel 4 would host content from the free streaming service U. The content would be a mixture of U Originals, including the new Bergerac series, Outrageous and The Marlow Murder Club, and archive shows such as Red Dwarf, The Office and Not Going Out.

== 2023 rebrand ==
On 2 November 2022, Channel 4 announced plans to rebrand its on-demand service, All 4, as Channel 4. In a statement released by Channel 4, the change enabled it to become "the first UK broadcaster to adopt one brand identity across its digital and linear channels". All 4+ would rebrand to Channel 4+. It was also announced that their portfolio of channels will also align with the Channel 4 branding. It took place in Spring 2023.

== Television platforms ==
=== Blu-ray players and televisions ===
A 4oD app for the Samsung Smart TV service was released on 22 March 2013.

The Channel 4 app is pre installed on LG webOS smart TVs as well as being on LG content store.

=== Freesat ===
4oD became available as part of Freesat's second generation Free Time guide on 27 June 2013, offering the last seven days of programming integrated to the TV guide and access to the archive via the on demand section. It is no longer be available on Freesat services.

=== Sky ===
4oD was added to Sky's On Demand service on 18 March 2013.

=== Virgin Media ===
The Channel 4 VoD service is available on Virgin Media's cable television service.

=== YouView ===
4oD was one of four services available at the launch of YouView in July 2012. At launch, the 4oD app contained options to resume watching recent programmes and browse by most popular, categories, collections, and A-to-Z, but lacked a search function and contained non-skippable adverts. It is also available for BT TV and TalkTalk Plus TV customers, as these services run on YouView.

== Game consoles ==
=== PlayStation 3 ===
4oD was released on 14 December 2010 on PlayStation 3 via the PlayStation Network. This service was accessible through ps3.channel4.com, but has now been replaced with a native app. The app version of 4oD for PlayStation 3 was released on 20 June 2013, allowing access to the full Channel 4 library. The service closed on PS3 systems on 31 January 2021.

=== PlayStation 4 ===
The 4oD app was launched on PlayStation 4 on 23 December 2015.

=== PlayStation 5 ===
All 4 is now available on the PlayStation 5.

=== Xbox 360 ===
On 5 October 2011, it was announced that 4oD would be made available to all Xbox Live Gold members. The service also integrates with the Xbox 360's Kinect controller. All 4 was added to the Xbox Live on 21 December 2011. All content on Xbox Live contains ads which cannot be skipped.

=== Xbox One ===
On 8 November 2013, Channel 4 announced that the 4oD app would be available on Xbox One when it launched on 22 November 2013. In August 2019, the app was removed from the Microsoft Store.

== Mobile platforms ==
=== Android devices ===
A 4oD app for the Android operating system was released on 5 February 2013. As of 2020 Android version 5.0 or greater is required. The service does not support devices it detects as rooted.

=== iOS devices ===
A 4oD iPad app launched on 3 May 2011, offering a 30-day catch-up service. As of 2011, this app was compatible with iPad with iOS 3.2 or later. The design of the app was elegant and intuitive but received unfavourable reviews because of technical issues and its use of commercial breaks. Since 2013, download and offline watching is supported.

A 4oD app for the iPhone and iPod Touch allowing a 30-day catch-up was released on 2 September 2011, along with an update to the iPad app. Both apps support search functionality to enable users to navigate the catch-up and archive content. They can both be browsed in 3G, but video playback is still only available with a Wi-Fi signal to "ensure the quality of the viewing experience isn't affected". The app also links to Channel 4's content on iTunes, allowing programmes to be purchased.

=== Windows Phone ===
On 13 November 2013, a native 4oD app was launched for mobile phones running the Windows Phone 8 platform.

== Computer platforms ==
The service was originally available as a Windows-only desktop program for downloading shows similar to BBC iPlayer Desktop. Following the launch of the web version of 4oD in April 2009, the desktop client continued to allow content from outside the catch-up window to be downloaded. The Kontiki based program which offered Windows Media Video downloads was closed in July 2009.

The desktop client offered programming from other broadcasters such as FX and National Geographic as well as movies from 20th Century Fox. A Download To Own (DTO) or "Buy" feature was also available on selected content, allowing users to purchase a programme and keep it for as long as they wish.

On 17 December 2012, Channel 4 and Microsoft released a dedicated 4oD application for Windows 8. The move saw Channel 4 become the first major UK broadcaster to support the operating system with a native app.

== Exclusive programming ==
- Channel 4 Shorts (2014–present)
- Walter Presents (2016–present) – foreign language titles
- The Island (2016–present)
- Hunted America (2017–present)
- Don't Hug Me I'm Scared (2022–present)
- MASHED (2013–present)

== See also ==
- Film4oD
- BBC iPlayer
- ITVX
- 5
- List of streaming media services
