= BT TV =

British television service

- Formerly: BT Vision
- Type: Pay television
- Industry: Internet Protocol television
- Founded: 5 December 2006
- Headquarters: London, England
- Area served: United Kingdom
- Owner: BT Group
- Parent: BT Consumer
- Website: www.bt.com/tv

BT TV (formerly BT Vision) and EE TV are subscription-based Internet Protocol television (IPTV) services provided by BT and EE, brands of BT Consumer, a division of British telecommunications company BT Group.

The two services originated as entirely separate entities, each operating on their own proprietary hardware. BT Vision was launched in 2006 and was the second IPTV service in the UK after HomeChoice. It underwent several iterations before rebranding to BT TV in 2013 as an umbrella brand alongside its YouView service that was introduced in 2012, initially operating in parallel before consolidating with the latter in 2014. Concurrently, EE TV was launched in 2014 and was maintained when BT acquired EE in 2016 as part of a multi-brand strategy before closing in 2021.

Following BT's plans in 2022 to make EE their flagship brand for its Consumer customers, BT TV was rebranded as EE TV in 2023. A strategic reversal in 2025 led to the return of BT TV in 2026 for those on BT Broadband, while EE TV continued for those on EE Broadband. The dual-branded offering packages Freeview with subscription television, video on demand, and interactive streaming applications via identical proprietary hardware.

== History ==
=== Background ===
When British Telecom (BT) was privatised in 1984, it was banned from providing television broadcasts over its telecommunication network, which meant it was not possible for BT to provide a cable television service. The ban was designed to protect the new smaller telecommunications companies and the small cable television networks in the United Kingdom as it was felt that BT had an unfair advantage because its pre-privatisation monopoly meant that its equipment was already installed in virtually every home and business in the country. In January 2001, the ban was lifted.

Despite the ban on BT offering cable services, it did offer to customers in the 1990s analogue satellite receivers compatible with the Astra satellite system (with built-in VideoCrypt decoders for receiving the Sky Multichannels package); these boxes were rebadged versions of receivers built by other companies, such as the BT SVS200 being a Cambridge ARD200.

=== Launch of BT Vision ===
In October 2005, BT announced plans to launch an Internet Protocol television (IPTV) service the following year using a set-top box developed in partnership with Philips. Initially offered to their BT Broadband customers for an undisclosed price with the potential for it to be offered to other users, the service would provide video on demand and catch-up services with the ability to watch programmes shown during the previous week without needing to record them. Both paid and free options for certain shows would be available, and would encompass a range of movies and music, as well as digital TV channels, with no monthly subscription fee.

BT Vision was launched on 5 December 2006, competing with Sky, Virgin Media (then known as NTL:Telewest) and TalkTalk TV (then known as Tiscali TV). Initial industry reaction was positive although there was some criticism that set up costs were expensive and it was noted that BT were entering a competitive market. In May 2007, BT launched a national advertising campaign for BT Vision. BT Vision was the second IPTV service in the UK after HomeChoice.

The aim was to attract "hundreds of thousands" of customers by the end of 2007 and 2–3 million in the medium-term. However, adoption was slow and by February 2008 BT Vision had just 150,000 customers. On 7 January 2008, BT reached a deal with Microsoft where the latter's Xbox 360 console would have provided BT Vision's on demand content. The service was due to launch in mid-2008 but never materialised. From late May 2008, BT Vision discontinued free access to BBC TV replay, instead requiring Vision users to take out a monthly subscription. However, in November 2010, BT announced that BT Vision subscribers would be able to access the BBC iPlayer from the end of June 2011. This service was built by Pushbutton for Microsoft Mediaroom.

==== Sky and Setanta sports ====
BT acquired the rights to carry 242 same-day (but not live) Premier League football matches per season in a three-year deal covering the 2007–08, 2008–09 and 2009–10 seasons in a joint bid with BSkyB on 25 May 2006, prior to BT Vision's launch. BT Vision also have the right to offer on demand coverage of 125 matches each season from the Football League and League Cup. This service ceased prior to the start of the 2010–11 season.

Between August 2007 and June 2009, Setanta Sports was available through BT Vision, via DTT and a smart card, offering live Premiership and Scottish Premier League games, as well as other sporting events such as US PGA Tour Golf and Magners League Rugby. BT Vision made a deal with American sports TV company ESPN for carriage of its new channel which replaced Setanta on DTT.

On 28 June 2010, BT and Sky signed an agreement where Sky Sports 1 and 2 will be available for BT Vision customers. This came a year after BT stopped offering Setanta Sports 1 & 2 on Vision after Setanta lost the rights to broadcast Premier League football. The company announced the pricing of their Sky Sports packages in July 2010, following the outcome of Ofcom's review into pay-TV pricing in March, which directed Sky to reduce the wholesale price it charges for the Sky Sports channels. The price charged to customers signing up for broadband, calls and TV with BT for a two-year contract results in the organisation making a "significant loss on the service", allowing them to undercut the price charged by Sky to its own customers. As of 2011, BT Vision had 638,000 subscribers, whereas Sky TV had over 10 million and Virgin Media had 3.76 million.

==== UKTV, Fox, Nat Geo and Eurosport deals ====
BT then made several deals to expand its offerings on BT Vision. UKTV original content on-demand from later in the day was added as part of a deal (featured programmes included James Martin's Mediterranean (Good Food), Choccywoccydoodah (Good Food), Extreme Makeover: Home Edition (Home), Celebrity Fantasy Homes (Home), Tool Academy (Really), Bridezillas (Really), Amazing Planet (Eden) and Life on Fire (Eden)). Linear channels from UKTV started streaming later in 2012, namely Watch, GOLD and Alibi, and later Good Food, Eden and Home.

On 11 April 2012, BT and Fox International Channels announced that from late 2012, BT Vision customers would be able to watch FX (which became Fox) as a linear channel as well as on-demand and watch library programmes on-demand. On 1 March 2016, Fox was removed from the BT TV line-up. National Geographic Channel and Nat Geo Wild were also added in 2012.

On 8 November 2012, BT signed a contract with British Eurosport to add British Eurosport 1 and 2 to its line-up of linear TV channels. The deal included sporting content to watch on demand. On-demand content was later removed but re-added in mid 2018 following the signing of a new deal with Eurosport's current owners Discovery.

=== YouView and rebranding to BT TV ===
On 21 September 2012, BT, one of the partners of YouView, announced that they would provide a free YouView box to its broadband subscribers. This new service will allow customers to access BT Vision's on demand content, YouView's EPG technologies such as 'scrollback', and Now TV. This came weeks after TalkTalk launched its new YouView-based TV service. YouView from BT launched on 26 October 2012.

On 27 June 2013, the CEO of BT's TV division, Marc Watson, said that BT Vision will be rebranded as 'BT TV', together with the YouView service under an umbrella brand. BT aimed to offer sports on the YouView service. However, on 1 August 2013, BT was refused by rival BSkyB to broadcast Sky Sports on BT's YouView service. This meant that the Vision+ box would continue to be distributed for the purpose of Sky Sports and the extra linear channels, as long until these features would be finally available on BT YouView.

BT started rebranding its TV services as BT TV between May and August 2013. On 9 August 2013, the 18 extra linear channels from BT Vision were successfully added to the BT YouView EPG and ready for streaming. Just two days prior to this, both BT and TalkTalk asked Digital UK to expand the streamed IP channel range from 400–499 to 400–599, as they both claim to launch over a hundred new streamed channels via YouView. The Vision service that continued to be provided to Sky Sports customers closed entirely on 30 June 2014, with all customers getting a free upgrade to its modern YouView service. In the last quarter of 2014, BT added 45,000 TV customers, followed by 97,000 in the same period of 2015, taking its total subscriber base to 1.4 million.

==== Launch of BT Sport ====
At the time of the rebrand, BT was also preparing to launch its BT Sport network, after the company had acquired a share of the rights to Premier League football television coverage for the 2013–14 to 2015–16 seasons and an exclusive rights deal for the broadcast of Premiership Rugby from the 2013–14 season. For customers who didn't have access to BT's fibre-optic network, they could watch these channels via DTT on a Vision+ box, but on 24 January 2014 BT ceased to sell BT Sport via DTT, and subsequently ceased provision of BT Sport 2 via DTT on 1 January 2015, followed by BT Sport 1 closing on DTT on 2 June 2015.

==== Sky Movies, AMC and other deals ====
The carriage for Sky's Sky Movies (now known as Sky Cinema) channels and on-demand content became available to customers from 26 October. On 10 November 2014 BT and YouView announced that the Netflix player had been made available on BT & retail Humax YouView boxes. Sky Sports 1 & 2 were made available to YouView customers on Tuesday 16 December 2014 following an interim ruling from the Appeal Court backing Ofcom's ruling that YouView is to be included in the "Wholesale Must Offer" of the channels.

The American AMC channel launched for the first time in the UK exclusively for BT customers on 28 August 2015 and was also available to order free of charge on all EE TV packages and to Sky TV customers who also subscribe to the BT Sports Pack. In June 2018 it was announced that Amazon Prime Video would be available through BT TV, followed by Now TV in April 2020.

In 2022, BT TV kicked off the transition of going fully IPTV with its aerial-based Freeview channels starting to be offered via broadband, which is called "Internet Mode" on the new set-top boxes. Both rivals Sky and Virgin Media had at the time also launched full IPTV services called Stream

=== Rebranding to EE TV and reversal ===
BT announced plans in 2022 to make EE their flagship brand for its Consumer customers. In June 2023, BT were allegedly preparing to rebrand BT TV to EE TV, with a relaunch that would add free multi-room support and YouTube.

==== Origins ====
EE TV was launched in October 2014 and was marketed as the "most advanced television service in the United Kingdom". It was free for EE mobile customers who signed up to EE Broadband, while those with pay-monthly mobile plans were given a boost to their mobile data allowance. It was based on the Netgem PVX (Personal Viewing Experience) platform and supported the Hybrid Broadcast Broadband TV (HbbTV) standard. It offered over 70 Freeview channels, 13 free-to-air high-definition (HD) channels, and various video on demand and catch-up services, including BBC iPlayer, Demand 5, Wuaki.tv, The Box Plus Network, YouTube, and Dailymotion.

It had its own proprietary set-top box that featured digital video recorder (DVR) capabilities including 1 terabyte (TB) of storage, four built-in HD tuners allowing users to record up to four channels simultaneously, and to stream live or recorded content on up to three mobile devices via the dedicated iOS and Android apps. The mobile app also functioned as a remote control and had a "flick" function that allowed users to cast content from their mobile screen to the TV. Viewing could be paused on one device and resumed from another, a unique feature at launch. There was also a feature known as "Replay" that allowed continuous recording of up to six pre-selected channels from the last 24 hours, though early product reviews criticised its inability to save these recordings. In response, Netgem released a software update in April 2015 with a new feature known as "Save from Replay" alongside "HD Replay", which expanded continuous recording to support HD channels. The BBC Connected Red Button (later BBC Red Button+) was added in December 2014, followed by Now TV in March 2015.

Following BT's acquisition of EE in January 2016, the service was maintained as part of a multi-brand strategy. In March 2016, a new feature known as "Recordings To Go" was added. As a UK first, it allowed recordings to be transferred and stored on a mobile device until manually deleted. However, it was withdrawn three months later following discussions with content rights holders. The main terrestrial broadcasters in the UK argued that the feature infringed copyright laws and had not been consulted prior to its launch. Concurrently, the electronic programme guide (EPG) within the app could be accessed and recordings scheduled remotely to the set-top box from any location; previously, it had only been accessible when connected to the home broadband network. In addition, the guide layout was updated to align with the TV interface.

It was no longer offered to new customers in June 2019, with Apple TV 4K replacing its set-top box and offered with EE Broadband to those who held pay-monthly mobile plans or 12/24-month SIM-only plans. It included linear broadcast channels, the Apple TV app, and third-party streaming apps including BT Sport, BBC iPlayer, ITV Hub, Netflix, Amazon Prime Video, Now TV, and YouTube. The legacy service was eventually phased out on 31 March 2021.

==== Rebrand ====
In October 2023, it was announced that the service would be renamed EE TV by December, adapting EE's logo and name. Along with the rebrand, Apple TV+ was launched on EE TV.

== Hardware ==
The very first BT Vision PVR (personal video recorder) in 2007, dubbed the "V Box" and combining IPTV and DTT, with a 160GB hard disk was grey and was initially made by Philips. The box can also access standard definition Freeview broadcasts where available. Similar to Sky+ and V+ it enabled 80 hours of television programmes to be recorded while watching other live programmes. It was announced in 2008 that Motorola would be the new supplier of the boxes.

The next generation shiny black Vision+ box was made by Pace and released in 2009. The original silver Vision+ boxes were of no use as of 30 June 2014; all customers received a free upgrade to YouView, worth £199, if they recontracted for 18 months. Users of the black Vision+ boxes were unaffected.

BT released a Humax set top box (DTR-T1000) in late 2012 offering Freeview HD services, linear VOD HD channels through BT Infinity, and on-demand boxsets, catchup TV and other new features as part of the newly launched YouView service. As of February 2024, these old boxes are no longer supported and cannot access internet-based content. A new upgraded and fanless box YouView+ (Humax DTR-2100) launched in early 2014.

In 2017, the BT YouView+ Ultra HD box (technically a Humax HDR-T4000) was launched as part of the new generation of PVR set-top boxes, competing against its rivals's offerings namely Sky Q and the Virgin V6 box. In 2021, the TV Box Pro was launched which added Wi-Fi and HDR support. It has 1 TB of storage, double that of its predecessor. Following rebranding to EE TV, it is currently offering the EE TV Box Pro (a PVR), EE TV Box Mini (without recording capabilities), and it has also launched EE TV as an app for the Apple TV 4K.
