= SeeSaw (Internet television) =

Former internet television service

- Website type: Video on demand
- Available in: English
- Dissolved: 28 October 2011
- Owners: Criterion Media Group (75%); Arqiva (25%)
- Creator: Arqiva
- Website: seesaw.net
- Registration: Optional
- Launched: 17 February 2010; 16 years ago
- Current status: Defunct

SeeSaw was an Internet television service, born out of the BBC-led Project Kangaroo and launched in the UK on 17 February 2010. It was acquired by the Criterion Media Group in July 2011 but the agreed investment never materialised. The service was shut down on 28 October 2011. At its peak the site was able to attract 2 million users a month.

== Development ==
SeeSaw used part of the technology that was originally built for Project Kangaroo, the now defunct project owned by BBC Worldwide, Channel 4 and ITV plc. Project Kangaroo was blocked by the Competition Commission in February 2009. In September 2009. Project Kangaroo's technology and assets were bought by Arqiva for approximately £8m. The SeeSaw brand was announced on 3 November 2009. ioko developed the software and the user experience for the site, having already developed the software for Project Kangaroo. SeeSaw went into a closed beta on 26 January 2010 and was trialled by 20,000 people before being launched to the public on 17 February 2010. Streaming was done using Adobe Flash Player at three video quality settings - low, medium and high at speeds of 500 kbit/s, 800 kbit/s and 1,500 kbit/s respectively.

=== Beyond the browser ===
At launch, SeeSaw CEO Pierre-Jean Sebert confirmed that the company was in talks with set-top box manufacturers, TV manufacturers and game console manufacturers with a view to extending its service to additional screens. Former parent company Arqiva is a member of YouView, a hybrid television platform.

In January 2010, SeeSaw made its first foray away from the computer by making its ad-supported content available through Boxee. Senior Technical Architect, Ben Gidley, acknowledged looking into iOS solutions, although a lack of DRM stalled development. Platforms supporting Adobe Flash were expected to work and Gidley was able to confirm Android compatibility on 15 June 2010.

=== International licensing ===
On 2 August 2010, Pierre-Jean Sebert, said SeeSaw was in late-stage negotiations with media companies in two countries to license its technology. "It started as an opportunity, but we have now equipped ourselves in a strategy to deal with international expansion, on a business-to-business basis through partnerships," Mr Sebert said. While Sebert revealed that one of the deals was in Europe and the other was in a country "very far away", it was understood that one of the deals could have involved taking the SeeSaw brand name as well.

== Content ==
On 2 December 2009, SeeSaw announced a content deal with BBC Worldwide, so shows such as Cranford, Lark Rise to Candleford, That Mitchell and Webb Look and classic Doctor Who would be available for viewers at launch. On 29 January 2010, SeeSaw announced several deals. SeeSaw would carry programmes from Channel 4, including shows such as Peep Show, The Inbetweeners, Skins and Grand Designs and also from Five, including programmes such as The Gadget Show, Neighbours and Home and Away. SeeSaw reached a separate agreement with UK independent distributor Digital Rights Group, which resulted in ITV dramas, such as Doc Martin and Kingdom being made available. SeeSaw also agreed separate deals with independent production firm Shed Media (through its distribution arm Outright Distribution) and Talkback Thames for a variety of programming including Footballers' Wives, Bad Girls, Waterloo Road and The Apprentice. In addition, the firm agreed the "first of many" planned US content deals with RHI Entertainment for 50 made-for-TV movies.

SeeSaw launched to the public on 17 February 2010 with over 3,000 hours of free content, supported by 60-second pre and mid-roll advertising. June 2010 saw the addition of a pay-per-programme feature, with a 48-hour viewing window. On 20 May 2010, SeeSaw launched its paid-for service offering 1,000 hours of premium content. The platform had already agreed a deal with MTV Networks for Comedy Central shows such as South Park and MTV properties such as The Hills, My Super Sweet 16 and Laguna Beach. A range of BBC Worldwide shows were also available to rent, including The Royle Family, Gavin & Stacey, Spooks and Louis Theroux documentaries. The firm said that "several" other agreements were in the pipeline with "major Hollywood studios" to offer around 2,000 hours of premium content in the coming months.

On 18 August 2010, SeeSaw agreed a content deal with NBC Universal Television Distribution to make shows such as House, 30 Rock and Law & Order: Special Victims Unit available on its video on-demand website. The multi-year deal enabled SeeSaw users to rent individual episodes or full series of a range of US series, including The Office, Heroes and Battlestar Galactica.

As of October 2011, only archive shows from BBC Worldwide remained following SeeSaw's financial trouble.

== Key appointments ==
Maya Bhose from NBC Universal was appointed as head of brand marketing. Fallon were announced as the creative advertising agency and Vizeum as the media agency, with a £5m budget allocated to promoting the site. On 3 March 2010, SeeSaw hired Neovia Financial to implement and manage a payment system for its premium content service.

Nick Thompson, the long-time Managing Director of broadcast & media at Arqiva left in April 2011 as part of a management reorganisation at Arqiva. His successor, Charles Constable, was not made responsible for SeeSaw as Arqiva sought an investment partner. Pierre-Jean Sebert, formerly MD of British Eurosport, was appointed as Managing Director of SeeSaw on 31 July 2009 but left the company in 2011 as part of financial restructuring at Arqiva. As part of the Criterion Media Group's investment in SeeSaw, Michael Jackson became chairman designate on 14 July 2011, however he walked away from the company in September 2011 as Criterion failed to raise funding. On 13 September 2011, platform controller John Keeling, commercial director Matt Rennie and product director Richard Dines resigned from SeeSaw.

== Takeover ==
On 19 January 2011, Arqiva announced plans to find an investment partner for SeeSaw, with options for a sale of the online TV service believed to be under consideration. Arqiva completed a strategic review of SeeSaw in October 2010 and was seeking an investment partner to help with the "aim of accelerating the development of the service".

However, on 27 May 2011, an announcement on the SeeSaw blog confirmed that "next month will be the end of the road for SeeSaw", with Arqiva directly announcing that SeeSaw would close on 20 June 2011, after failing to find an investment partner or buyer. However the site remained open, with Arqiva in talks to sell SeeSaw to US investment firm Criterion Capital Partners, although only a limited selection of free content from BBC Worldwide, Channel 4 and Channel 5 remained available. On 14 July 2011, it was announced that a consortium of investors, including Criterion Capital Partners, had purchased a 75% stake in SeeSaw for more than £10m. Arqiva retained a 25% stake, while Criterion Media Group, a division of Criterion Capital Partners, took majority ownership of SeeSaw. Criterion Capital Partners said the deal pulled together a number of investors: entertainment executives, new media entrepreneurs, institutional funds, and private equity partners.

As part of the deal, Criterion was required to raise a multimillion-pound round of funding to drive the rejuvenation of SeeSaw and set up its 28 staff in new headquarters by 31 August. Part of Criterion's plan to bring profitability was to renegotiate nearly 20 programme content deals. However SeeSaw failed to renegotiate its content deals with Channel 4 and Channel 5, losing two of its key partners. In September 2011 Criterion was understood to have run into problems with the lead backer in the investment consortium, Weston Capital. The delay meant that Arqiva was no longer contractually bound to run the venture, including providing ongoing funding. However the company and its remaining 15 members of staff were able to move out of Arqiva into a new office.

On 28 October 2011 SeeSaw was closed down after investors failed to provide the committed funding. Any users visiting the SeeSaw website are told "Thanks for your support but SeeSaw is no longer available."

For a while, the domain formally owned by the company linked to an iOS app that allowed users to sell things. As of November 2018, the domain redirects to seesaw.me, an educational learning platform.
