= Criterion Capital Partners =

Private equity firm

Criterion Capital Partners LLC.
- Type: Private
- Industry: Internet
- Founded: 2002
- Defunct: 2018
- Headquarters: San Francisco, California, U.S.
- Area served: United States; Canada; United Kingdom
- Key people: Christopher Lord (co-founder) David Riley (co-founder); Tomoko Fortune; Louis Chang; Matt Perona (director of finance); Jeffrey Pisani (director of operations); Sara Parr (director of investor relations); Adam Levin (Bebo) (CEO)
- Net income: N/A
- Number of employees: 3 (2010)
- Website: criterioncp.com

Criterion Capital Partners LLC, also known as simply Criterion, was a private equity fund based in Los Angeles, California. It was best known for being the owner of Bebo, from 2010 to 2013.

== History ==
Christopher Lord co-founded the company in 2002. Criterion acquired social networking service Bebo in 2010. Bebo was previously owned by AOL, who originally purchased the service for $850 million in 2008. The acquisition had failed as Bebo's business was declining. AOL sold the company for less than $10 million to Criterion. Following the acquisition, Bebo's business did not improve. In April 2012, the minority shareholders filed a $5 million suit against Criterion for “destroying the site". Then in May, TechCrunch reported that Bebo filed for voluntary Chapter 11 bankruptcy.

In 2018, the Wall Street Journal reported that the company was shutting down.
