= Humax =

South Korean consumer electronics company

Humax Co. Ltd.
- Type: Public
- Traded as: KRX: 115160
- Industry: Consumer electronics
- Founded: February 1989; 37 years ago
- Headquarters: Seongnam, South Korea
- Key people: Dae Gyu Byun (Chairman, Founder); Tae Hun Kim (CEO)
- Products: Consumer electronics including set-top boxes, video gateways, broadband gateways

Humax (Korean: 휴맥스) is a consumer electronics company. Founded in South Korea in 1989, it manufactures set-top boxes, digital video recorders and other consumer electronics. It is publicly traded on KOSDAQ.

Listed on the Korean stock exchange (KOSDAQ), Humax Co. Ltd of Korea is one of the world's leading digital set-top box manufacturers, exporting its products to more than 90 countries across the globe. The company's international headquarters and R&D facility is based in Korea, with offices in UK (England and Northern Ireland), Germany, Italy, France, Poland, Dubai, India, Thailand, Australia, Hong Kong, Japan, US, Mexico, Brazil, Sweden, China and Spain. The global network now includes countries in Europe, North Africa, Russia, East Asia and Australia.

In 1997, the company opened a manufacturing facility in Northern Ireland which won a Queen's Award for Enterprise – International Trade 2002, but which has since closed. Additional production facilities are located in Korea, Poland (2004), India and China. Humax recorded revenues $1 billion in 2010.

Humax is a member of the Hybrid Broadcast Broadband TV (HbbTV) consortium of broadcasting and Internet industry companies that is promoting and establishing an open European standard (called HbbTV) for hybrid set-top boxes for the reception of broadcast TV and broadband multimedia applications with a single user interface.

Humax was involved in the UK digital switchover trials in 2006 and the UK's Freesat digital TV service and Freeview HD services. It also manufactures YouView set-top boxes for BT and Plusnet's IPTV and Freeview television services.

== Milestones ==
- March 2012 - Wins tender of the Russian Government to deploy receivers for the DVB-T2 digital broadcasting format.
- May 2010 - Opens office in Russia & France / Records $1 Billion in exports.
- May 2007 - Establishes subsidiary in Thailand
- May 2006 - Establishes subsidiary in Poland
- December 2005 - Establishes subsidiary in Hong Kong
- September 2004 - Opens office in Shenzhen, China
- August 2003 - Establishes subsidiary in New Delhi, India
- February 2002 - Opens sales office in London, UK.
- November 2001 - Records $200 million in exports. Establishes a subsidiary in Tokyo, Japan.
- November 2000 - Records $100 million in exports.
- January 2000 - Establishes a subsidiary in Frankfurt, Germany.
- December 1999 - Establishes a subsidiary in Dubai, UAE. Develops and ships set-top boxes for digital cable TV service.
- May 1997 - Establishes a subsidiary in Belfast, UK.
- April 1997 - Listed on the KOSDAQ.
- September 1996 - Develops and ships set-top boxes for digital satellite broadcasting.
- 1994 - Focuses business activities on digital home appliances.
- May 1992 - Ships home karaoke machines.
- February 1989 - Conin System Co, Ltd. founded by 7 graduates (all holding master's degrees or Ph.Ds.) from Seoul National University, Dep't of Control and Instrumentation.

== Products ==
=== The Netherlands ===
- IRHD-5300C
- IHDR-5200C
- IRHD-5100C
- IHDR-5050C
- HD-FOX C DELTA, special designed for Delta

=== UK ===
- FVP-5000T (Freeview Play Recorder)
- HDR-2000T (Freeview HD TV Recorder)
- HDR-1800T (Freeview HD TV Recorder)
- HDR-1100S (Freesat HD TV Recorder)
- DTR-T2000 (YouView+ HD TV Recorder)
- HD-FOX T2 (FreeView+HD TVRecorder/FreeviewHD Box)

=== Germany ===
- iCord HD+ (IP Hybrid PVR)
- iCord HD
- HD-FOX+ (IP Hybrid HD)
- HD-FOX
- PDR-iCord HD

=== Brazil (for NET) ===
- HG100R-L2
- HG100R-L4
- HGB10R-02
- HGJ310

=== Middle East ===
- iCord HD
- iCord HD+ (IP Hybrid PVR)
- IR1010HD
- IR1020HD
- IR2000HD
- IR2020HD
- IR3000HD
- IR3020HD
- IR3025HD
- IR3100HD
- HD-FREE
- IR-FREE

=== Italy ===
- HD-5700T
- HD-5600S

=== Japan ===
- CI-S1 (Car - Digital TV Tuner)

=== Thailand ===
==== Special designed for TrueVisions ====
- IR-H100S
- IR-H101
- IR-H102S
- PVR-H100
- HD-2000S
- HD-5000S
- HD-H200S
- HD-H10S

=== Turkey ===
- HM 9502 HD
- HM 9503 HD

=== United States ===
- Google Fiber GFHD100
- Spectrum 210/201 DVR and 110/101 HD
- DirecTV Genie and Genie 2 DVR
- AT&T Fiber BGW320-500

== See also ==
- Freesat
- Freeview+
- DVR
- PVR
