= TalkTalk TV =

UK-based consumer television and video on demand service

- Formerly: Homechoice; Tiscali TV
- Company type: Pay TV
- Industry: IPTV
- Founded: 2000
- Headquarters: Salford Quays, Greater Manchester, United Kingdom
- Area served: United Kingdom
- Website: www.talktalk.co.uk

TalkTalk TV is a UK-based consumer television and video on demand service, operated by the TalkTalk Group. It originally launched in 2000. In September 2012, the current TalkTalk TV was launched in partnership with YouView. Its television and video on demand service is delivered over a BT phone line, using ADSL or VDSL. It provides IPTV, video on demand, telephony and broadband internet access.

== History ==
=== Launch as HomeChoice ===
While TalkTalk TV in its current form launched in 2012, its predecessor dates back to 2000 when the UK's first video on demand service, HomeChoice, was launched, at first covering an area in north London. It was provided by Video Networks Limited (VNL), based in Shepherd's Bush in London, which utilised high-speed ADSL connections. By 2003, HomeChoice had just 3,000 subscribers, compared to Sky's 7 million and over 2 million each for both Freeview and digital cable operators. HomeChoice avoided bankruptcy and relaunched in 2004, striking a deal with BSkyB to provide Sky Sports and Sky Movies to HomeChoice customers.

=== Purchase by Tiscali, then Carphone Warehouse ===
HomeChoice was purchased by Tiscali UK in August 2006 and rebranded to Tiscali TV in February 2007, by which time it had 40,000 subscribers in areas of London and Stevenage. TalkTalk TV was initially only available in parts of London, Surrey and Hertfordshire. By September 2007, central and northern England were TalkTalk TV-enabled. By 2011, 680 telephone exchanges were Tiscali LLU-enabled, mostly in London, Manchester, the Midlands and Yorkshire, with a smattering throughout the rest of the country.

Access to the channels and to the video-on-demand was via a self branded set-top box that was connected to the customer's Television set. The final set-top box featured an Aerial socket and a DVB-T receiver. A wireless router for internet access that connects to the set-top box was also provided. On 13 February 2007, HBO announced C1, its new VOD service was to become available on Tiscali TV. British Sky Broadcasting announced that it was to supply Tiscali TV with its basic TV package including Sky1, Sky2, Sky Arts, Sky News and Sky Sports News.

On 30 June 2009, the European Union approved a deal in which Carphone Warehouse would buy all the assets of Tiscali UK. As a result of Tiscali UK's acquisition, Tiscali TV was rebranded as TalkTalk TV in January 2010. TalkTalk TV however struggled to compete against Sky, Virgin Media and BT's television services. On 20 October 2010, TalkTalk announced its plans to launch a new TV service in 2011, in a partnership with YouView. By the start of 2011, TalkTalk discontinued its existing TV service and removed it from the company's official site.

=== 2012 relaunch as a YouView service ===
TalkTalk formally launched its YouView-based TV service in September 2012. As of May 2013, TalkTalk TV was Britain's fastest growing TV service. YouView launched a Netflix player for new and existing Netflix customers. This is now on retail boxes and this launched on TalkTalk in late 2015.

These boxes also allow access to digital terrestrial television (DTT) signals using an additional aerial to watch Freeview channels. Originally all its channels and content were available on the TalkTalk Player without any EPG channel numbers. On 7 August 2013, the channels became available on the YouView EPG, and were re-numbered in 2015. The company previously offered their service in two forms: TalkTalk TV Lite or TalkTalk TV Plus; where TalkTalk TV Plus has an enhanced pause/rewind capability.

=== 2022 TV Hub launch ===
TalkTalk launched TV Hub in October 2022 which is powered by Android TV and based on technology developed with YouView.

== See also ==
- TalkTalk TV Store
