= Audience Council Scotland =

The Audience Council Scotland (ACS) is an organisation that helps the BBC Trust understand the needs, interests and concerns of audiences in Scotland. It was created in January 2007 alongside the BBC Trust (which operated until 2017). It replaced the Broadcasting Council for Scotland which had many responsibilities the present Council now has.

The ACS is chaired by the BBC Trustee for Scotland and consists of 11 members who bring a range of interests, experience and perspectives to the work of representing the audience in Scotland. The Council meets at least 11 times per year to assess and advise the BBC Board.

The ACS holds a number of public engagement events throughout the year across the country and meets monthly to discuss issues concerning audiences. ACS engages with audiences in a range of ways, it monitors comments made by audiences to the BBC, reviews audience research, and may commission its own, ACS engages directly with members of the audience via focus groups and a range of audience events. Recent examples of the ACS advising the BBC Trust were the Nations and Regions Impartiality Review and input into services such as BBC Alba (launched in 2008).

The Council reports to the BBC Trust monthly on issues of concern to licence payers in Scotland and presents an annual report to the BBC Trust. The ACS monitors the performance of the BBC against the Public Purposes set for it in the Royal Charter and Agreement. The ACS also publishes an account of its activities and assessment in the BBC Scotland Annual Review

There are other councils for the other three nations in Wales, England and Northern Ireland.

== Members ==
- Jeremy Peat Chair and National Trustee for Scotland (reappointed 2008)
- Robert Beveridge
- Douglas Chalmers
- James Cohen
- Beth Culshaw
- David Garrick
- Patricia Jordan
- Eleanor Logan
- Sir Neil McIntosh
- Rak Nandwani
- Callum Thomson
- Lesley Thomson

== History ==
=== 1950s ===
The Broadcasting Council for Scotland held its first meeting on 14 January 1953, chaired by BBC National Governor for Scotland, Lord Clydesmuir. Held in Broadcasting House, 5 Queen Street, Edinburgh, the meeting was attended by the BBC's Director General, Ian Jacob and the Chairman of the BBC Board of Governors, Sir Alexander Cadogan.

The minutes show that the Council offered strategic guidance on many key broadcasting issues over the years; from the extension of the transmitter network to the north and west to the development of BBC television output for Scotland in the 1950s. 'The prime need', wrote the Council in its section of the BBC Annual Handbook in 1958, 'is to correct the inescapable predominance of English and metropolitan interests'.

=== 1960s and 70s ===
The Broadcasting Council's brief was extended to include television output in Scotland in 1962.

In 1975 the National Governor of the time, Lady Avonside, recommended to the Annan Committee on broadcasting that there should be more Scottish material, the development of community radio.

The Council played a distinctive role in the debate which led to the launch of a national radio service - BBC Radio Scotland - in 1978, under National Governor Professor Alan Thompson.

=== Recent History ===
In the run-up to the re-convening of the Scottish Parliament in 1999, the council, under National Governor Rev. Norman Drummond, argued for a change in the nature of news programming in Scotland in the debate on the Scottish Six.

The Council commissioned a review of BBC news in Scotland in 2003. Although 38% of those surveyed said they would prefer an integrated news programme from Scotland, 45% preferred the 6-7pm 'news hour' arrangements which were already in place.

The governance of the BBC was reorganised at the end of 2006. 'A Public Service for All: the BBC in the Digital Age', published by the Department of Culture, Media and Sport, stated that 'the Government believes that the Councils, or their successors, still have a valuable role to play within the Trust's wider accountability framework' as a starting point, the Charter and Agreement will provide for the Broadcasting Councils to be replaced by new Audience Councils for England, Scotland, Wales and Northern Ireland.

When the BBC Trust replaced the BBC Board of Governors in January 2007, the Broadcasting Council was disbanded and replaced by the BBC Audience Council for Scotland. BBC National Governor for Scotland, Jeremy Peat, took over the chair of the new Council as BBC Trustee for Scotland.

== BBC National Governors and Trustees for Scotland ==
- Lord Clydesmuir (1952–4)
- Thomas Johnston (1955–6)
- Earl of Balfour (1956–60)
- Sir David Milne (1960–65)
- Lady Baird (1965–70)
- Lady Avonside (1971–6)
- Professor Alan Thompson (1976–9)
- Dr (later Sir) Roger Young (1979–84)
- Watson Peat (1984–9)
- Sir Graham Hills (1989–94)
- Rev. Norman Drummond (1994–99)
- Sir Robert Smith (1999–2004)
- Jeremy Peat (2005-)

== See also ==
- BBC Trust
- BBC Scotland
- BBC Alba
- Audience Council England
- Audience Council Wales
- Scottish Broadcasting Commission
