= Digital Media Initiative =

Cancelled BBC technology project

Timeline of DMI development
Date	Event
February 2008	DMI promoted by director of BBC Technology Ashley Highfield; BBC Trust approves scheme and £81m funding. Project is outsourced to Siemens.
December 2009	Siemens contract is terminated in £27.5m settlement; BBC losses amount to £10.7m. Project is brought in-house.
March 2010	New DMI business plan rejected by the BBC Finance Committee
February 2011	National Audit Office criticises the DMI project
June 2011	DMI is partly outsourced to a consortium of three IT companies: Computacenter, Mediasmiths & Vidispine.
May 2013	BBC cancels DMI

The Digital Media Initiative (DMI) was a British broadcast engineering project launched by the BBC in 2008. It aimed to modernise the Corporation's production and archiving methods by using connected digital production and media asset management systems. After a protracted development process lasting five years with a spend of £98 million between 2010 and 2012, the project was finally abandoned in May 2013.

== Initial impetus and relaunch ==
The technology programme was initiated by the director of BBC Technology Ashley Highfield in 2008. It aimed to streamline broadcast operations by moving to a fully digital, tapeless production workflow at a cost of £81.7 million. Forecast to deliver cost savings to the BBC of around £18 million, DMI was contracted out to the technology services provider Siemens with consulting by Deloitte. Among the production features to be provided by DMI were a media ingest system; a media asset management system, unifying audio, video and stills archival; an online storyboarding system; and metadata storage and sharing. A core part of the system was formed by using Cinegy, a production suite originally developed prior to the DMI project by the BBC and selected by Siemens in 2008. The DMI Programme Director was television producer and entrepreneur Raymond P. Le Gué.

Costs of the project rose after a number of technical problems and delays, and in 2009 the BBC terminated its contract with Siemens. BBC losses were estimated to be £38.2m, partially offset by a £27.5m settlement paid by Siemens, leaving a loss of £10.7m to the BBC. The BBC was criticised by the UK National Audit Office (NAO) in 2011 for its handling of the project. In evidence given to the NAO, the Director of the BBC's Future Media and Technology division, Erik Huggers, stated that Siemens had been selected to run the project without a tendering process because the BBC already had a 10-year support contract with the company. He also remarked that transfer of risk on the project to Siemens had resulted in a distant relationship with Siemens which made it hard to monitor project milestones and the completion of deliverables.

When we checked in with Siemens to look at, "Okay, where are these deliverables? Where is the software?" it turned out that the project was not going according to plan at all.[...] So, basically, the relationship with Siemens with regards to DMI was [...] rather distant.

— Erik Huggers, Evidence to the Public Accounts Committee, 15 February 2011

After the termination of the Siemens contract, the DMI project was brought in-house by the BBC in 2009 and rebranded as Fabric.

In 2012, it was reported that BBC staff who worked on a number of projects including DMI had suffered from severe stress and had been treated at The Priory.

== Developments in 2013-14 ==
According to a report in The Guardian, problems emerged in April 2013 during the coverage by BBC News of the death and funeral of Margaret Thatcher. News staff, attempting to source material on analog videotape from the BBC Archives, were unable to transfer footage to digital format due to the huge demand for limited transfer facilities at the newly refurbished New Broadcasting House in central London. Requested tapes were reportedly transported around London by taxi and via the Tube, and video transfer work was carried out by external production companies. A few weeks later it emerged that tape editing equipment might have to be installed at Broadcasting House in specially cooled areas.

In late May 2013 the Director-General of the BBC, Lord Hall, announced that the project was to be abandoned and that the BBC's chief technology officer, John Linwood, was to be suspended pending an external investigation into the management of the DMI project. It was subsequently revealed that a senior BBC manager had expressed grave doubts about DMI to the BBC Chairman Lord Patten one year before the project was cancelled. He had also claimed that there was a "very significant risk" that the National Audit Office had been misled about the actual progress of DMI in 2011. Other BBC executives had also voiced similar concerns for about two years before DMI was abandoned.

The NAO commenced an inquiry into the failure of the project and commissioned accountancy firm PricewaterhouseCoopers to carry out an investigation. At a hearing held on 10 June 2013 at the BBC's MediaCityUK site in Salford, MPs Margaret Hodge and Stewart Jackson commented on evidence given by the then Director General Mark Thompson to the NAO in 2011 and to the BBC Trust, and took the view that he had misled the enquiry. BBC Trust member Anthony Fry remarked that the DMI had been a "complete catastrophe" and said that the project was "probably the most serious, embarrassing thing I have ever seen."

On 24 January 2014, the BBC confirmed that the contract of former technology chief John Linwood had been terminated the previous July due to the failure of the Digital Media Initiative.

On 10 April 2014, the House of Commons Committee of Public Accounts presented the "BBC Digital Media Initiative, Fifty-second Report of Session 2013–14" in which it defines the project as a "complete failure"

== See also ==
- BBC Archives
- BBC controversies
- Development hell
