= Chitra Bharucha =

Indian-born British haematologist

Chitra Bharucha MBE FRCPath FCGI FRSA
- Born: 6 April 1945 (age 81); Madura, British India

Academic background
- Education: Ewart School, Madras and Christian Medical College Vellore

Chitra Bharucha (born 6 April 1945) is a British former consultant haematologist and former vice chairman of the BBC Trust, the governing body of the British Broadcasting Corporation. She became the first woman and first South Asian ("Asian" in British English) to head the BBC

== Early life and career ==
Born in Madurai, India, she has lived in the UK since 1972. She was educated at Ewart School, Madras and Christian Medical College Vellore, gaining her medical qualification before moving to the UK in 1972. Between 1981 and 2000, she was consultant clinical haematologist at Belfast City Hospital and was deputy director of the Northern Ireland Blood Transfusion Service. She was elected to the General Medical Council in 1999 where she served on a number of panels including chair of the Fitness to Practise Adjudication Panels.

In 1996, Bharucha moved into positions in the media industry, serving on the BBC Broadcasting Council for Northern Ireland until 1999. In April 2001 she was appointed Northern Ireland member of the Independent Television Commission, where she served until December 2003 when the ITC was subsumed into Ofcom, and she became a member of the Advertising Standards Authority Council in November 2004.

In April 2002, Bharucha was appointed Chair of the Advisory Committee on Animal Feedingstuffs for the Food Standards Agency, and in 2006 she was appointed Lay Member of the Review Body for Judicial Complaints. She was appointed a MBE in the 2008 New Year's Honours List for services to the animal feedstuffs industry.

== BBC ==
In October 2006, Bharucha was appointed as Vice Chairman of the BBC Trust, the body that succeeded the Board of Governors as the governing body of the British Broadcasting Corporation. She was to be the deputy to Michael Grade, the then BBC Chairman. Grade resigned soon after the formation of the Trust on 1 November 2006 and Bharucha became the Acting BBC Chairman, a position that she held until Sir Michael Lyons took over the chairmanship on 1 May 2007.

She became a Member of the Order of the British Empire in 2009.

Bharucha stood down from her role as Vice Chairman of the Trust on 31 October 2010.

== References and external links ==
- BBC Trust. "Chitra Bharucha". Archived from the original on 27 August 2007.
  - BBC (12 October 2006). "Press Release: New BBC Trust to represent the public interest".
  - BBC (28 November 2006). "Press Release: Michael Grade resigns as BBC Chairman".
- ITC. "Members and Directors - Chitra Bharucha".
- ASA. "Council Members". Archived from the original on 2 February 2007.
- GM Science Review. "Members' Interests - Chitra Bharucha".
- Food Standards Agency. "Advisory Committee On Animal Feedingstuffs". Archived from the original on 9 June 2007.

Media offices
| Preceded by Michael Grade as Chair designate; Anthony Salz as Acting Chair of the BBC Board of Governors | Acting Chairman of the BBC Trust; 1 January 2007 – 1 May 2007 | Succeeded by Sir Michael Lyons as Chairman |
| Preceded by Anthony Salz as Vice Chair of the BBC Board of Governors | Vice Chairman of the BBC Trust; 1 January 2007 – 31 October 2010 | Succeeded by Sir Roger Carr |
