= Richard Tait =

British journalist and professor

Richard Graham Tait CBE (born 22 May 1947) is a British journalist and Professor of Journalism at Cardiff University. He had been a member of the BBC Trust, the governing body of the British Broadcasting Corporation, and was replaced by Richard Ayre.

Tait was a former editor of BBC's Newsnight, Channel 4 News (1987–1995) and was Editor-in-Chief of ITN (1995–2002). He is a fellow of the Royal Television Society and the Society of Editors.

== Education ==
Tait was educated at Bradfield College, a boarding independent school for boys in the village of Bradfield in Berkshire, followed by the University of Oxford.

== BBC career ==
Following his involvement in a post-Hutton review, Tait joined the former BBC Board of Governors on 1 August 2004. He replaced Baroness (Sarah) Hogg who left the Board at the end of her four-year term of office. During his time on the board, he was the chairman of the Governors' Programme Complaints Committee, which heard appeals against complaints regarding BBC programmes.

Upon the formation of the BBC Trust, Tait was one of four Governors (including then Chairman Michael Grade, Dermot Gleeson and Jeremy Peat) who transitioned to the new governing body of the BBC. In April 2008 his term as a Trustee was extended until 31 July 2010.

Tait chairs the Trust's Editorial Standards Committee, which sets the BBC's editorial and content standards and hears appeals against editorial complaints.

== Other posts and honours ==
He was formerly Director of the Centre for Journalism Studies at Cardiff University, but stood down from the role in 2012 to concentrate on research.

In 2003 Tait was awarded a CBE for services to broadcast journalism.

Media offices
| Preceded by David Dickinson | Editor: Newsnight; 1985–1987 | Succeeded by John Morrison |
| Preceded by ? | Editor-in-Chief of ITN; 1995–2002 | Succeeded by ? |
