= Salica Investments =

London investment firm

- Formerly: Hambro Perks
- Type: Private company
- Industry: Venture Capital
- Founded: 2013; 13 years ago
- Founders: Rupert Hambro, Dominic Perks
- Headquarters: London, United Kingdom
- Key people: John Foley (Chairman), Andrew Wyke (CEO)
- Products: Growth investment
- Website: salicainvestments.com

Salica Investments is a London-headquartered investment firm. It was founded as Hambro Perks in 2013 by Rupert Hambro CBE and Dominic Perks.

The Financial Times described the company as "an unlikely fusion of old and new City — clubby establishment networking alongside high-tech entrepreneurial energy."

After the death of Rupert Hambro and the sudden departure of Dominic Perks in 2021. Sir Anthony Salz became the Chairman of Hambro Perks between 2021 and 2024. In 2024, the company was renamed as Salica Investments and appointed John Foley as its new Chairman.

== History ==
Hambro Perks was founded in 2013 by Rupert Hambro CBE and Dominic Perks. The firm was originally conceived as a venture investor and incubator.

In August 2017, Hambro Perks hired Kate Burns to run its new media division. Burns was managing director of UK business at Google from 2001 until 2006 before becoming regional director of UK, Ireland, and Benelux as the US web giant expanded. Later, she became the chief executive of European business at AOL.

In December 2020, Hambro Perks was reported to have established a fund specialising in environmental technology chaired by the prominent businessman Sir John Rose.

In January 2021, it announced the establishment of the Hambro Perks Special Opportunities Fund which includes companies sold by Invesco in the wake of the Neil Woodford scandal.

In October 2021, The Sunday Telegraph reported that the firm had established a fund to help 'paper millionaire' entrepreneurs and company founders sell part of their shareholdings. Hambro Perks Co-founder Dominic Perks said his aim with the new fund is to give investors access to shares in fast-growing companies that “will be the stars of the stock market in a few years time”.

The new fund has already backed companies including NA-KD, one of Europe's fastest-growing fashion e-commerce companies, set up by entrepreneur Jarno Vanhatapio.

In November 2021, Hambro Perks was named as the sponsor for the first-ever Special-purpose acquisition company to be listed on the London Stock Exchange following changes to the rules required to list the vehicles. The listed company, Hambro Perks Acquisition Company, will be chaired by Sir Anthony Salz, with veteran investor Dominic Shorthouse also joining the board.

In December 2021, the listing of Hambro Perks Acquisition Company (HPAC) was confirmed as having completed., with co-founder Dominic Perks described by The Times as a 'blazing a trail in London's embryonic market for special purpose acquisition companies'.

In April 2023, Dominic Perks quit his role as Chief Executive with immediate effect. He served as the company's CEO since he co-founded the business in 2013.

In 2024 the company name was changed to Salica Investments and John Foley was appointed as its new Chairman.

== Portfolio Companies ==
The Hambro Perks portfolio is made up of over 100 firms including:

- Takumi - puts brands in touch with "social influencers"
- Kortext - digital textbook platform in the UK
- what3words - re-maps the world in 3M by 3M blocks
- Previse - AI Fintech startup
- Muzmatch - Muslim dating app
- Tide - mobile banking services for small businesses
- Gelesis - biotechnology company developing treatments for obesity
- HawkEye 360 - geospatial analytics company
- Movewise - multi-agent property seller

Other notable investments linked to Hambro Perks include Sipsmith, which was sold to drinks giant Beam Suntory in 2016.

== See also ==
- Carl Joachim Hambro (banker)
- Rupert Hambro
- Sir Anthony Salz
- Sir John Rose
- Clive Hollick
