= MSN Video Player =

Microsoft Computer Video Player

MSN Video Player was an online video on demand player, launched in the United Kingdom by Microsoft on 11 March 2010.

The service was made available in beta form on 3 August 2009 with 300 hours of shows from BBC Worldwide and All3Media. A spokeswoman for BBC Worldwide confirmed that all BBC programmes on MSN Video Player will be at least 180 days old. Programmes were made available in both Windows Media Video and Flash formats, streamed without digital rights management copy protection but only be available to people with a UK web address. During the opening 11 days of the beta, MSN Video Player pulled in a total of 167,487 video views by 154,841 users, with users staying for an average of 25 minutes.

Microsoft has since agreed additional deals for over 1,000 hours of programming with independent product firms Digital Rights Group, Endemol, Shed Media, Raw Cut, RDF Media. The company further holds a separate agreement with Pact - the UK trade association for independent TV and film producers - which stipulates full licensing terms for on-demand content, including availability periods and potential exclusives. Users on MSN Video Player will also be able to access the MSN Video service, featuring short-form clips such as film trailers and news items.

The platform was optimised for Microsoft Silverlight - support that was notably missing from the beta - although it also works with Flash, and some of the content is available in HD streaming at 720p on connections of 2 Mbit/s and upwards. All content on the service will be available for free, with half-hour programmes preceded by short commercials, while programmes of one hour or longer are interrupted by a commercial break.

Ashley Highfield, Microsoft's UK consumer and online managing director, suggested that in the future the service will offer users who have a Windows Live ID and are signed in, programme recommendations – based on their previous viewing habits and that a tie-up with Microsoft's gaming console, the Xbox 360, would be on the cards. MSN's UK head of video, Rob Crossen, added "An obvious place to tale MSN Video Player – given the quality of content that you are seeing on the platform – is the TV, and there are a number of ways, widgets on internet connected TVs, we have our own products within the Microsoft network, Xbox and Windows Media Center for instance." When asked if a mobile MSN Video Player was likely for the forthcoming Windows Phone "We have a fantastic product coming later in the year, but no fixed plans that we are announcing today." On 10 May 2010, a Microsoft spokeswoman said there are currently no plans to roll out the service in other regions. On 19 May 2010, MSN Video Player was added to Windows Media Center in the TV Strip in the UK.
