= Janet Lewis-Jones =

Welsh member on the BBC Trust

Janet Ann Lewis-Jones (12 May 1950 – 13 May 2017) was a member for Wales on the BBC Trust, the governing body of the British Broadcasting Corporation from 2006 to 2010. She was also formerly a vice president of the British Board of Film Classification and a board member at S4C.

== BBC ==
On 1 November 2006 Lewis-Jones was appointed as one of the founding members of the BBC Trust, which along with a formal executive board replaced the former BBC Board of Governors as the governing body of the BBC. As National Trustee for Wales, Lewis-Jones also chaired the Audience Council Wales, an advisory body to the BBC Trust.

Janet Lewis-Jones stepped down from the BBC Trust on 31 October 2010.
