= Yarl's Wood Immigration Removal Centre =

Immigration detention centre in Bedfordshire, England

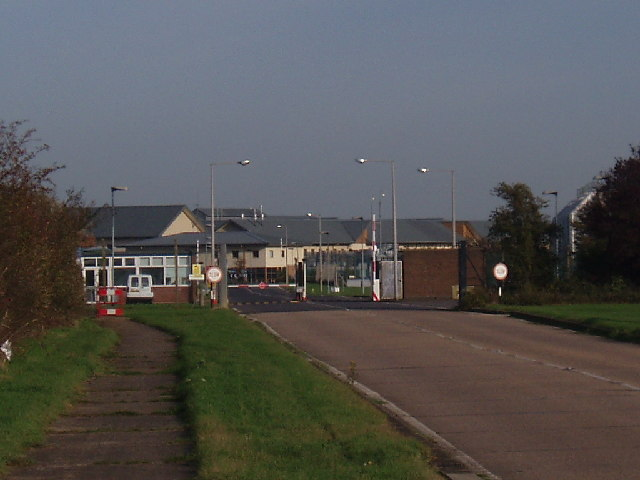
- Entrance to the centre

- Location in the United Kingdom
- Location: Bedfordshire, England; 52°11′43″N 0°29′05″W
- Status: Operational
- Security class: Immigration removal centre
- Opened: 19 November 2001
- Managed by: Serco

Yarl's Wood Immigration Removal Centre is an immigration detention centre for foreign nationals prior to their deportation from the United Kingdom, one of 10 such centres currently in the UK. It is located near Milton Ernest in Bedfordshire, England, and is operated by Serco, which describes it as "a fully contained residential centre housing adult women and adult family groups awaiting immigration clearance." Its population is, and has been, overwhelmingly female.

== History ==
Yarl's Wood opened on 19 November 2001 with a second wing added in January 2002, creating a capacity for over 900 people, making it the largest immigration detention centre in Europe at the time. Initially managed by Group 4 Falck, control passed in May 2004 to Global Solutions Limited (GSL), which was sold off at this time by Group 4 to private equity firms Englefield Capital and Electra Partners Europe.

In 2007, with Yarl's Wood "never having been far from controversy" (a fire following a protest in February 2002, for example, gutted the centre, which did not reopen until September the following year), GSL's contract was not renewed, and control was signed over to Serco, which has run Yarl's Wood to the present time. Chris Hyman, then Serco chief executive, said winning the £85M contract "recognises our ability to care for a wide range of detainees". Serious incidents have continued, however, since the change in management.

== Controversies ==
=== February 2002 fire ===
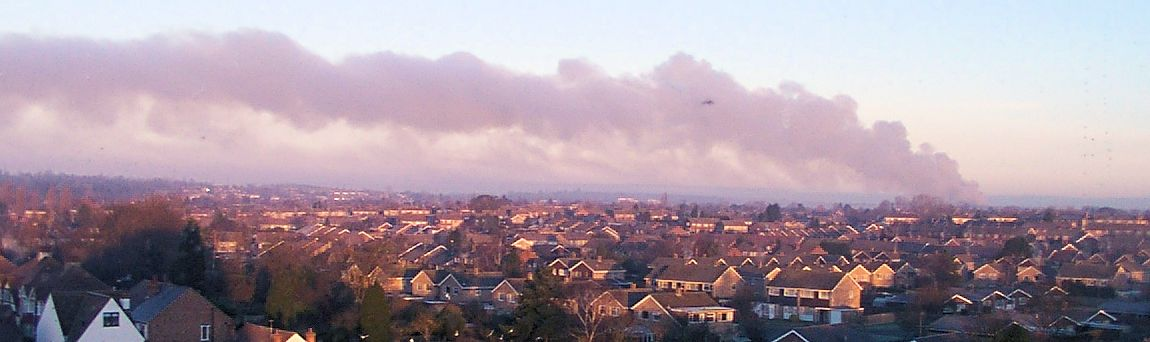
Yarl's Wood fire aftermath, February 2002

In early February 2002, the building was burnt down following a protest by the detainees. This was triggered by someone being physically restrained by staff. According to custody officer Darren Attwood, officers complied with orders to "lock the detainees in the burning building". Five people were injured in the fire.

=== Hunger strikes ===
In 2012, more than 28,000 individuals were held in immigration detention [in the UK]. Many were held for only a few days, but more than one third have been held for more than two months, and others have been detained for many months or years. Some 2,000 were women who had sought asylum in the UK. The United Kingdom is one of the few European countries that puts no time limit on such detention.

— Philippe Sands

Just after opening in December 2001, the first hunger strike began with twenty five Roma detainees refusing to eat.

In July 2005, more than 30 Ugandan women detainees went on hunger strike to protest about the behaviour of some staff at Yarl's Wood. They issued a statement detailing their poor treatment and attacking the level of health provision for detainees. "There is no urgency about making sure we are getting the help we need."

In May 2007, it was reported that there was a hunger strike involving over 100 women.

On 4 February 2010, a hunger strike began with a number of women protesting their indefinite detention. One hunger striker had been held for 15 months. The hunger strike was escalated when, according to a Guardian report, "70 women taking part in a protest were locked in an airless corridor without water or toilet facilities."

On 20 April 2015, a hunger strike began with 31 couples from the Hummingbird Unit in regard to a death of a male detainee Pinakeen Patel, aged 33 from Gujarat, India. The hunger strike continued for a second day, resulting in the release of the widow on temporary admission. On 25 May in solidarity to an Indian Gujarati lady from Hummingbird Unit suffering from serious medical conditions, a sudden hunger strike was called out by the fellow detainees.

On 21 February 2018, a hunger strike by women detainees began in protest at the Home Office policies of detaining people who came to the UK as minors, detaining asylum seekers and people who had survived torture, and detaining people indefinitely. A government letter in response to the hunger strike stated that it could "lead to your case being accelerated and your removal from the UK taking place sooner". On 8 March (International Women's Day) a 24-hour strike by activists took place in solidarity with hunger strikers.

=== Sexual abuse ===
There have been a series of corroborated allegations of a sexual nature made against staff. The only witness to one alleged incident was deported before she could be interviewed by the police. Almost 90% of people held at Yarl's Wood are women. Approximately half the staff are male.

The decision in November 2014 to give Serco a new £70 million eight-year contract to run the centre was criticised by Natasha Walter of Women for Refugee Women: "Serco is clearly unfit to manage a centre where vulnerable women are held and it is unacceptable the government continues to entrust Serco with the safety of women who are survivors of sexual violence." The following month, Police and Crime Commissioner for Northumbria Vera Baird expressed her support for an independent inquiry.

=== Detention of children ===
In 2010, Children's Commissioner for England Albert Aynsley-Green reported that children detained at Yarl's Wood faced "extremely distressing" conditions and treatment. On 11 January 2011, the High Court ruled that the continued detention of the children of failed asylum seekers at Yarl's Wood was unlawful.

=== Deaths ===
In Yarl's Wood it's like looking out of a window in the middle of nowhere. There are no houses when you look out of the window. You're brought here in the middle of the night so you've no idea where you are.

— Anonymous detainee at Yarl's Wood, interviewed
about the death of Christine Case

In September 2005 Manuel Bravo, an asylum seeker from Angola, hanged himself while in detention awaiting deportation with his 13-year-old son following a dawn raid at his home in Leeds. In March 2014, 40-year-old Christine Case from Jamaica died at the centre from a massive pulmonary thrombo-embolism. The family were only told of her death eight hours later, and an investigation is under way into accusations that staff denied her medical assistance before her death. In April 2015 a 33-year-old detainee from India died of a suspected heart attack.

=== 2023 escape ===
In April 2023, a large group of detainees escaped from the centre by using gym equipment to scale the external security fence. Whilst many were captured shortly thereafter by Bedfordshire Police, eight men were able to evade immediate capture. Many dispersed to other parts of the UK, including London. All were subsequently captured in a seven-week national manhunt. The escape, manhunt and subsequent investigations featured on an episode of 24 Hours in Police Custody which aired on 6 January 2025.

Criminal proceedings

Criminal proceedings were brought against the eight men who had evaded capture following the escape. Many were sentenced to terms of imprisonment for both the escape and other offences.

- Mariglen Coha, aged 32 – 7 months' imprisonment
- Rizah Koka, aged 29 – 5 years imprisonment (for drug supply offences), including 6 months for the escape
- Arnold Lleshaj, aged 28 – 22 months' imprisonment (for violent disorder, criminal damage, and the escape)
- Enea Shima, aged 28 – 6 months' imprisonment
- Thanas Bizhoti, aged 28 – 7 months' imprisonment
- Bilbil Bodini, aged 27 – 8 months' imprisonment
- Luftim Hallaci, aged 21 – 8 months' imprisonment (for the escape in addition to a charge of criminal damage)
- Ervin Morati, aged 21 – 8 months' imprisonment

In addition to these eight, two of the five men who escaped but were immediately apprehended received sentences of imprisonment.

- Xhek Spahiu, aged 25 – 9 months' imprisonment
- Adrian Voci, aged 36 – 8 months' imprisonment

Alket Hida, aged 31, pleaded guilty to assisting two of the prisoners with their escape and was jailed for 15 weeks.

== Inspections ==
A September 2003 report by the Inspector of Prisons, found that provision at Yarl's Wood was "not safe".

In March 2004, the Prisons and Probation Ombudsman published a report into allegations of racism, abuse and violence, based on 19 claims made by an undercover reporter for the Daily Mirror. The report found evidence of a number of racist incidents, although noted that staff had been disciplined following publication of the journalists findings, and that an allegation of assault had not been properly investigated.

In October 2004, the Prisons and Probation Ombudsman published an inquiry into the disturbance and fire in 2002. One of its main findings was that the provision of sprinklers could have prevented the damage caused. In February 2005, a local fire chief alleged that the lessons had not been learnt as it was announced that there were no plans to introduce sprinklers.

In February 2006, the Chief Inspector of Prisons published an inquiry into the quality of health care at Yarl's Wood. It found substantial gaps in provision and identified 134 recommendations.

A 2006 Legal Action for Women (LAW) investigation into the centre found that: 70% of women had reported rape, nearly half had been detained for over three months. 57% had no legal representation, and 20% had lawyers who demanded payment in advance. Women reported sexual and racial intimidation by guards. LAW's Self-Help Guide has been confiscated by guards depriving detainees of information about their rights.

In April 2009, the Children's Commissioner for England published a report which stated that children held in the detention centre are denied urgent medical treatment, handled violently and left at risk of serious harm. The report details how children are transported in caged vans, and watched by opposite-sex staff as they dress. This follows earlier allegations in 2005 by the Chief Inspector of Prisons that children were being damaged by being held in the institution, citing in particular an autistic five-year-old who had not eaten properly in several days.

In 2012, whistleblower Noel Finn raised concerns about abuse towards patients with mental illness and who are detained in Yarl's Wood, most had not received adequate assessment or treatment. Patients deported or removed back to the very place they had been tortured had gone unchecked by the home office. It was reported by the whistleblower that patients had been sexually abused, no one to date has been prosecuted.

In April 2014, the UN's Special Rapporteur on Violence Against Women, Rashida Manjoo, was barred from Yarl's Wood by the Home Office when she tried to investigate complaints about the centre as part of her fact-finding mission into violence against women in the UK. In her 2015 report, Manjoo said that her being barred from Yarl's Wood reminded her of when the Bangladeshi government refused her access to investigate alleged crimes against women at a notorious refugee camp and when the Indian government forbade her entry to state-run facilities.

In August 2015 the chief inspector of prisons, Nick Hardwick described Yarl's Wood as a "place of national concern" and said that decisive action was needed to ensure that women were only detained "as a last resort".

In August 2017, the chief inspector of prisons inspection "found that there had been significant improvements at the centre... The most noticeable change was that... on this occasion the atmosphere across the centre was far calmer, respectful and relaxed.' A subsequent report was published in July 2023 finding that " while the experience for most detainees was currently adequate, we left Yarl’s Wood concerned about deteriorating outcomes in a centre that was having to manage a complex and larger population of detainees, who were held for longer periods."

== See also ==
- Immigration detention in the United Kingdom
- Modern immigration to the United Kingdom

== Bibliography ==
- Girma, Marchu; Radice, Sophie; Tsangarides, Natasha; Walter, Natasha (2014). "Detained: Women Asylum Seekers Locked Up in the UK" (PDF). With a foreword by Philippe Sands. London: Women for Refugee Women. Archived from the original (PDF) on 9 April 2014.
