= Anthony Salz =

British solicitor (born 1950)

Sir Anthony Michael Vaughan Salz (born 30 June 1950) is a British solicitor. He sat on the Board of Governors of the BBC from 1 August 2004, after the resignation of the former Vice Chairman, Lord Ryder, and was Acting Chairman in 2006 following the resignation of Michael Grade as BBC Chairman on 28 November 2006, Salz became Acting Chairman, and continued in this position until the BBC Trust succeeded the Governors on 1 January 2007.

Salz's career had given him experience in the broadcasting industry, as he had worked on the merger of Rupert Murdoch's Sky Television with the ailing British Satellite Broadcasting to form BSkyB. Until 2006, he was co-senior partner at Freshfields Bruckhaus Deringer.

== Early life and education ==
Salz was born in Tavistock, Devon, and was educated at Radley College. Salz obtained his law degree from the University of Exeter in 1971.

== Career ==
Salz has spent most of his career at Freshfields and its successor, Freshfields Bruckhaus Deringer. He spent a year at Davis Polk & Wardwell in New York in the late 1970s. From 1980 to 2006, Salz made a partner. From 1990 to 1994, he was the head of corporate finance.

In 1996, he became senior partner of Freshfields. He was a co-Senior Partner of Freshfields Bruckhaus Deringer from 2000 until 2006. In 2006, he joined Rothschild as an Executive Vice Chairman.

In July 2012, he was appointed to head an independent review into Barclays’ culture and business practices in the wake of the Libor-rigging scandal.

He is a non-executive board member at the Department for Education and is a trustee of the Scott Trust which owns The Guardian newspaper.

In August 2013, he was appointed chairman of the board of Bloomsbury Publishing, in an independent and non-executive capacity.

Salz was appointed non-executive vice chairman of venture firm Hambro Perks in 2019.

== Honours ==
Salz was knighted in the 2013 Birthday Honours for services to young people and public life.

Media offices
Preceded by Lord Ryder	Vice Chairman of the BBC; 1 August 2004 – 31 December 2006	Succeeded by Chitra Bharucha as Vice Chair of the BBC Trust
Preceded by Michael Grade	Chairman of the BBC; 28 November - 31 December 2006	Succeeded by Chitra Bharucha as Acting Chair of the BBC Trust
