= BBC Local Video =

British television channel in the West Midlands

BBC Local Video (originally Local TV) was a pilot project operating in the West Midlands region serving Birmingham, the Black Country, Coventry & Warwickshire, Staffordshire, Shropshire and Hereford & Worcester, England.

Teams of video journalists at six centres (sharing local radio offices) began broadcasts on digital satellite television (accessed via the BBC Red Button from any BBC channel on page 1700) and via the BBC's local websites on 1 December 2005. The service ran as a 9-month trial until the Summer of 2006.

The BBC Trust and regulator Ofcom reviewed the trial and undertook research into potential effects the service may have on competition, in particular the impact on newspaper sales. Criticism came from the Conservative Party and a section of the local newspaper industry as an unfair encroachment on established commercial interests in local media.

The Trust ruled in November 2008 that the service would not be value for money and called instead for more improvements to be made to the existing programming.
