= Jeremy Peat =

BBC governor (born 1945)

Professor Jeremy Alastair Peat OBE FRSE (20 March 1945 - 12 April 2026) was a member of the Competition Commission and former director of the David Hume Institute. He was a former member of the BBC Trust, the governing body of the British Broadcasting Corporation, where he was the Scottish Trustee.

== Career ==
=== Economist ===
Peat trained as an economist at Bristol University and University College London. He worked as an economist for various UK Government departments - including a brief spell at HM Treasury and eight years at the Scottish Office - and also carried his economic toolkit to assignments overseas, to Bangkok in 1972-74 and Botswana in 1980–84. In 1993 he was appointed Group Chief Economist at the Royal Bank of Scotland, a position he held for 12 years. On 1 July 2005 Peat was appointed the Director of the David Hume Institute, a position which he held until 2014.

He was a Fellow of the Royal Society of Edinburgh where he also served as Vice President of Business, and the Chartered Institute of Bankers in Scotland and was a member of the Competition Commission. He previously served as Chair of Trustees of the Royal Zoological Society of Scotland, board member of the Signet Accreditation Company and board member of Scottish Enterprise.

Peat received an Honorary Doctorate from Heriot-Watt University in 2010 and was a visiting professor at the International Public Policy Institute at the University of Strathclyde.

=== BBC ===
Peat joined the BBC on 1 January 2005 as the National Governor for Scotland on the former BBC Board of Governors, he replaced Sir Robert Smith (now Lord Smith of Kelvin). During his time on the board he was the chairman of the Audit Committee, a position Sir Robert also held. He was also the Chairman of the BBC Pension Board Trustees.

Upon the formation of the BBC Trust, Peat was one of four Governors (including Richard Tait, Dermot Gleeson and then Chairman Michael Grade) who transitioned to the new governing body of the BBC. On 1 November 2008 his term as a Trustee was extended until 31 December 2010.

Peat retired from the board of the BBC on 31 December 2010 after serving two terms.

== Personal life ==
Peat lived in Roslin Glen, Midlothian, and was a member of the Project Committee for the conservation of Rosslyn Chapel. He was married, with two daughters.
