= Alison Hastings =

Alison Jane Hastings (born 14 August 1965) is the member for England on the BBC Trust, the governing body of the British Broadcasting Corporation, and a Vice President of the British Board of Film Classification.

She was educated at the Folkestone School for Girls and became editor of the Newcastle Evening Chronicle for six and half years (1996–2002) and a member of the Press Complaints Commission (1999–2002). She also worked at Thomson Regional Newspapers as Head of Editorial Staff Development.

On 1 November 2006 Hastings was appointed as one of the founding members of the BBC Trust. Her term expired on 31 October 2014. As National Trustee for England, Hastings chairs the Audience Council England, an advisory body to the BBC Trust.
