= Norman P. Barry =

English philosopher (1944–2008)

Norman Patrick Barry
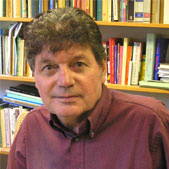
- Norman Barry
- Born: 25 June 1944; Northampton, England
- Died: 21 October 2008 (aged 64)

Philosophical work
- Era: Contemporary
- School: Classical liberalism
- Institutions: Queen's University Belfast, Birmingham Polytechnic, University of Buckingham
- Main interests: Political philosophy

Norman Patrick Barry (25 June 1944 – 21 October 2008) was an English political philosopher best known as an exponent of classical liberalism. For much of his career he was a professor of social and political theory at the University of Buckingham.

== Career ==
Barry taught for a year at Queen's University Belfast in Northern Ireland, which he later described as "about the worst place in the world outside sub-Saharan Africa". He then returned to England to work at Birmingham Polytechnic, where he began to study the ideas of classical liberalism and libertarianism, including works by Friedrich Hayek and John Jewkes. He subsequently studied the ideas of the Austrian School of economics, including authors such as Ludwig von Mises and Murray Rothbard, and the writings of Ayn Rand, although he disliked the latter. His first book, published in 1979, addressed Hayek's philosophy. His second book, in 1981, was a textbook on political theory with a "definite libertarian stance".

In 1982, he became a Reader in Politics at the University of Buckingham, which was at that time the only private university in Britain. In 1984, he was promoted to the position of Chair in Social and Political Theory. His work took increasingly explicit libertarian positions, defending free-market business activity and criticizing welfare programs.

Barry was an expert on the United States Constitution, and worked with several US-based organizations, including the Center for Social Philosophy and Policy at Bowling Green State University, the Liberty Fund, and the Ludwig von Mises Institute. He visited the country so frequently that at one point he was barred from entry due to overuse of his visa.

He served on the advisory council of the Institute of Economic Affairs. He also worked with the Institute for the Study of Civil Society and the David Hume Institute.

== Personal life ==
Barry was born in Northampton to Doreen and Tim Barry. His mother died when he was nine, after which he was raised by his father and an aunt. He attended the Northampton Grammar School, and then the University of Exeter. Barry was married, but divorced in 1985. In the 1990s, multiple sclerosis began to interfere with his activities, but he continued to work. He died of complications from the disease on 21 October 2008.

== Awards and honours ==
In 2005, he received the 'Liberty in Theory' Lifetime Award from the Libertarian Alliance.

In 2009, the University of Buckingham created a scholarship named in honour of Barry, to be awarded by its Max Beloff Centre for the Study of Liberty.

== Selected bibliography ==
- Hayek's Social and Economic Philosophy (1979)
- An Introduction to Modern Political Theory (1981)
- The Tradition of Spontaneous Order (1982)
- On Classical Liberalism and Libertarianism (1987)
- The New Right (1987)
- The Invisible Hand in Economics and Politics (1988)
- Welfare (1990)
- The Morality of Business Enterprise (1991)
- Classical Liberalism in an Age of Post-Communism (1996)
- Business Ethics (1998)
- Anglo-American Capitalism and the Ethics of Business (1999)

Barry's works have been translated into Chinese, Japanese, Turkish. and Persian.
