= Lord Grade =

Lord Grade may refer to:

- Lew Grade, Baron Grade (1906–1998), Russian-born English impresario and media mogul
- Michael Grade, Baron Grade of Yarmouth (born 1943), British broadcast executive and businessman, nephew of the above
