= Audience Council England =

Audience Council England was created upon establishment of the BBC Trust in January 2007. It replaced the Broadcasting Council of England. Audience Council England plays a key role helping the BBC Trust understand the needs, interests and concerns of audiences. There are also councils in each of the nations: Wales, Scotland and Northern Ireland. The Audience Council England meets at least six times per year to assess the BBC’s performance in England. It can meet in various locations around the nation. The regional panel chairs will give their regions view on the various BBC services, both national and regional, as well as provide their contribution to the Trust’s formal consultations.

== Members ==
Audience Council England is chaired by the BBC Trust member for England and the members, twelve in total, are the chairs of the regional panels (formerly known as the Regional Audience Councils). Each BBC region has its own regional panel. Alison Hastings is currently the BBC Trust member for England.

== Regional panels ==
The regional panels meet three times a year in their own region usually in the area’s BBC headquarters. They have a specific responsibility in keeping Audience Council England in touch with the views of the viewers and listeners in their region. In the meetings, the chair is present as well as representatives from BBC management, usually the Head of Region. Each regional panel has up to sixteen members from different backgrounds and locations within the broadcast region; members are appointed for up to three years; it is a voluntary position.

The regional panels represent the following regions:

- BBC North East and Cumbria
- BBC Yorkshire
- BBC North West
- BBC Yorkshire and Lincolnshire
- BBC East Midlands
- BBC West Midlands
- BBC East
- BBC South
- BBC London
- BBC West
- BBC South East
- BBC South West

== See also ==
- BBC Trust
- Audience Council Scotland
- Audience Council Wales
- BBC English Regions
