= Susan Nye, Baroness Nye =

British civil servant

The Right Honourable The Baroness Nye
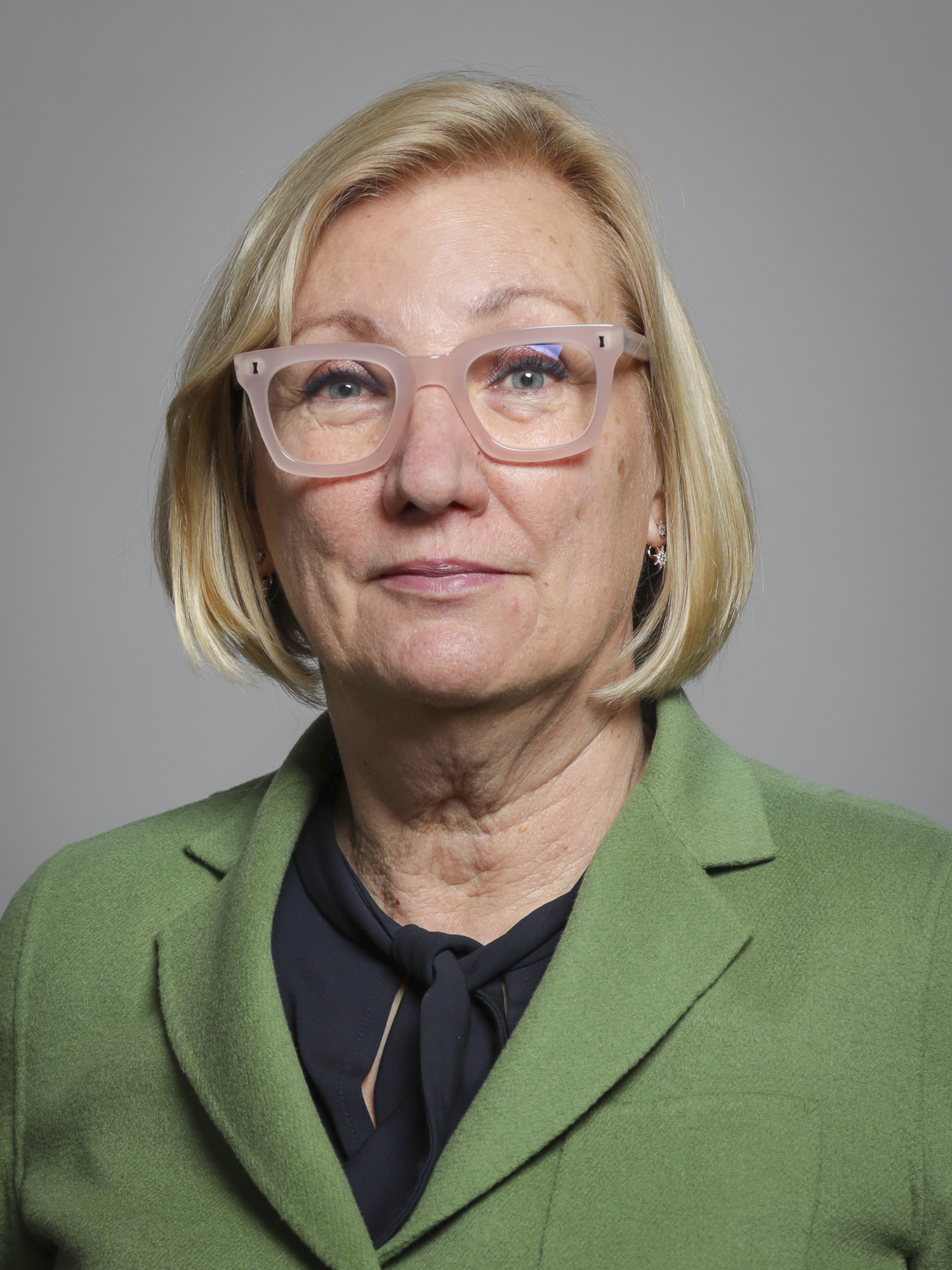
- Susan Jane Nye, 2019
- Born: Susan Jane Nye; 17 May 1955 (age 71); Denmark Hill, London, England, UK
- Occupation: Civil servant
- Known for: Director of Government Relations for Gordon Brown
- Political party: Labour
- Spouse: Gavyn Davies
- Children: 1 daughter and 2 sons

Member of the House of Lords
- Lord Temporal
- Life peerage 19 July 2010

Susan Jane Nye, Baroness Nye (born 17 May 1955) is the former Director of Government Relations and former diary secretary to ex-British prime minister Gordon Brown. In May 2010 it was announced that Nye would be named a life peer in the Dissolution Honours List. On 19 July 2010 she became a Labour Party Peer, as Baroness Nye, of Lambeth in the London Borough of Lambeth.

== Early life ==
She was born at King's College Hospital. She initially lived on Leander Road in Brixton. She went to a local primary school. Her father left the home and moved to South Africa, and her mother moved to Leigh-on-Sea. She passed the eleven-plus and went to Westcliff High School for Girls.

== Career ==
Nye worked as a civil servant before becoming an employee of the Labour Party. She worked for Michael Foot's office when he became Labour Party leader. Her friendship with Tony Blair's political secretary Anji Hunter provided a back channel between the warring factions during Blair's premiership.

In The Deal, Nye was portrayed by Joanna Scanlan.

== Personal life ==
Nye married Gavyn Davies, the former BBC chairman and former Goldman Sachs worker, in Islington, north London, in August 1989. They live in Wandsworth, having moved there to give their daughter the opportunity to attend a better school. The couple also have two sons and a further home in Croyde, Devon.
