= Folkestone School for Girls =

The Folkestone School for Girls

Location
- Coolinge Lane; Folkestone, Kent, CT20 3RB; England; 51°04′36″N 1°09′04″E

Information
- Type: Grammar academy
- Established: 1905
- Department for Education URN: 137837 Tables
- Ofsted: Reports
- Headteacher: M Lester
- Staff: 253
- Gender: Girls
- Age: 11 to 18
- Enrolment: 1048
- Houses: Austen; Curie; Johnson; Pankhurst; Lovelace; Seacole
- Colours: Dark Blue and Green
- Website: http://www.folkestonegirls.kent.sch.uk/

The Folkestone School for Girls (FSG) is an all-girls grammar school with academy status in Folkestone, Kent, England, next to Sandgate Primary School on Coolinge Lane.

The school, in its current form, on its current site and under its current name, started in 1983. Its history goes much further back, however, to 1905 as the Folkestone County School for Girls. There is a Folkestone School Old Girls' Association with further information and some 800 members, including from various of the current school's predecessors, which, along the way have merged. The previous names were various:

- The Grange (at Shorncliffe Road)
- Folkestone County Technical School for Girls
- Folkestone Technical High School for Girls
- Folkestone County Grammar School for Girls

The boys' grammar school is called the Harvey Grammar School.

== Admissions & Destinations ==
The school intended to use the entrance examination introduced by Dover Grammar School for Boys, but, after an objection by Kent County Council, it was ruled on 8 July 2005 by the Schools Adjudicator that the school should use the county's selection test and Shepway test. In 2017, around 85% of students either continued onto university or planned to do so after a gap year. The remainder went into directly into employment.

== Notable former pupils ==
- Tracey Crouch, Member of Parliament (MP) for Chatham and Aylesford
- Daphne Fowler, Brain of Britain winner 1997, BBC's Eggheads (TV series) team member 2003–Present
- Anne Farmer, professor of psychiatry
- Alison Hastings, Vice-President of the British Board of Film Classification (BBFC), and Editor of Newcastle's Evening Chronicle from 1996-2002
- Dame Sheila Sherlock, hepatologist
- Toriel Dreemurr, Teacher
