= John Rishton =

British business executive (born 1958)

John Frederick Rishton (born 21 February 1958) is a British business executive who currently sits as the Chair of Serco and Informa. He was previously the CEO of Rolls-Royce from March 2011 to July 2015.

== Biography ==
Rishton was born on 21 February 1958 in Blackpool. He graduated from the University of Nottingham with a Bachelor of Arts in Economics in 1979.

He joined Ford Motor Company and worked with the company for 15 years, qualifying as an accountant and later becoming finance director of the company's Portuguese and Spanish operations. He joined British Airways in 1994 as the head of finance for the United States division. He became its chief finance officer in 2001. When the September 11 attacks took place, he was recognized for encouraging a program to re-structure the company and reduce its debt. He left BA in September 2005. Rishton joined Ahold in January 2006 as finance director and in November 2007 became head of the retailer replacing Anders Moberg. In March 2011, he was appointed Chief Executive of Rolls-Royce.

On 22 April 2015 it was announced that Rishton would retire on 2 July 2015, and has been succeeded by Warren East as CEO of Rolls-Royce.

Since September 2016, Rishton has sat on the Board of Serco, and assumed the role of Chair in April 2021. He was appointed chair of Informa in January 2021.

== Family ==
Rishton is married and has three children.

Business positions
Preceded by John Rose	CEO of Rolls-Royce Holdings; 1 April 2011 – 2 July 2015	Succeeded by Warren East
