= Richard Ryder, Baron Ryder of Wensum =

British politician (born 1949)

The Right Honourable The Lord Ryder of Wensum OBE PC
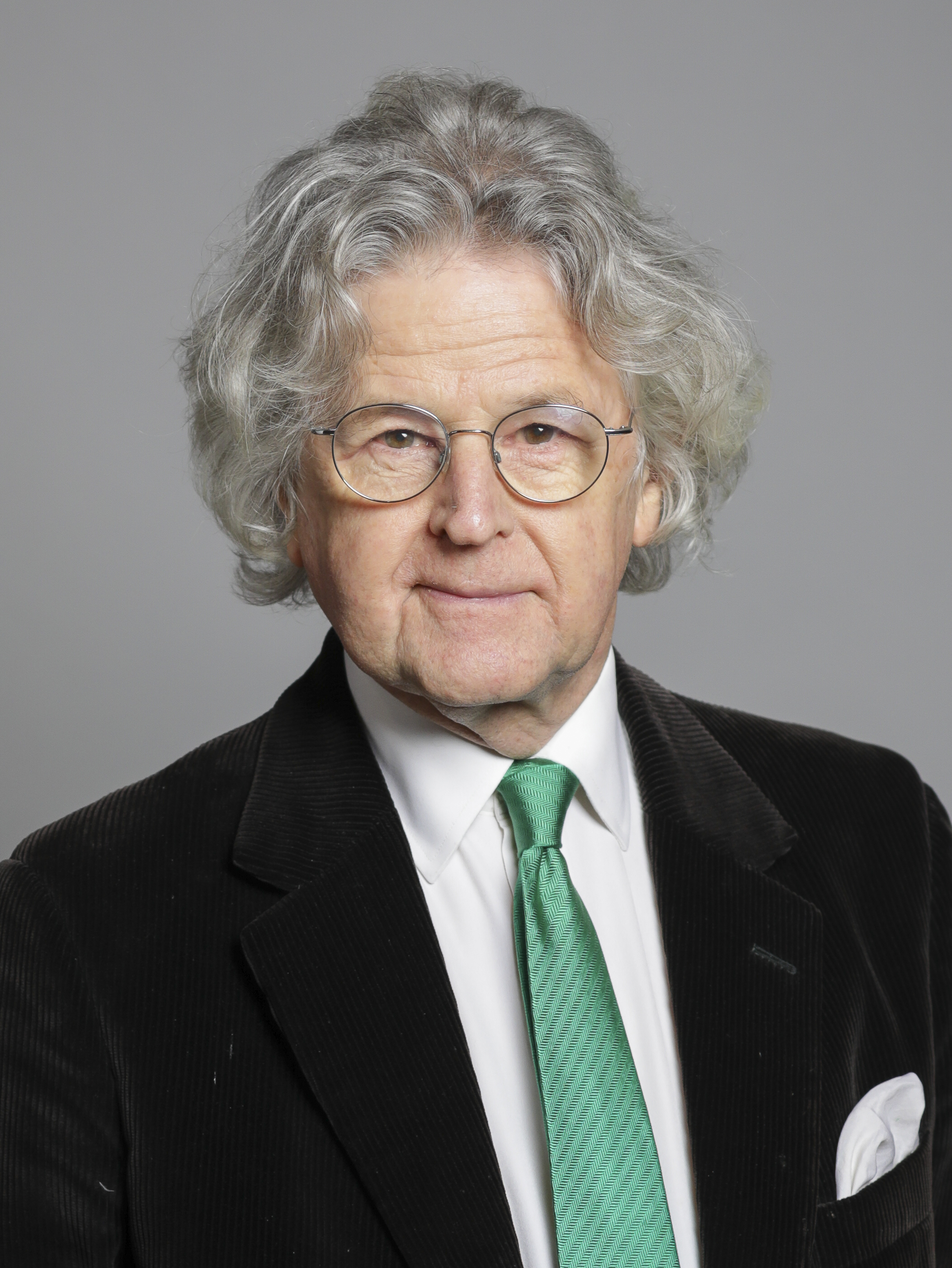
- Ryder in 2019

Chief Whip Parliamentary Secretary to the Treasury
- In office 28 November 1990 – 20 July 1995
- Prime Minister: John Major
- Preceded by: Tim Renton
- Succeeded by: Alastair Goodlad
Junior ministerial offices 1986–1990
Paymaster General
In office 14 July 1990 – 28 November 1990
Prime Minister	Margaret Thatcher
Preceded by	The Earl of Caithness
Succeeded by	The Lord Belstead
Economic Secretary to the Treasury
In office 24 July 1989 – 14 July 1990
Prime Minister	Margaret Thatcher
Preceded by	Peter Lilley
Succeeded by	John Maples
Parliamentary Under-Secretary of State for Agriculture, Fisheries and Food
In office 25 July 1988 – 24 July 1989
Prime Minister	Margaret Thatcher
Preceded by	Donald Thompson
Succeeded by	David Curry
Assistant Government Whip
In office 16 October 1986 – 24 July 1988
Prime Minister	Margaret Thatcher

Member of Parliament for Mid Norfolk
- In office 9 June 1983 – 8 April 1997
- Preceded by: Constituency Created
- Succeeded by: Keith Simpson

Political Secretary to the Prime Minister of the United Kingdom
- In office 1979–1981
- Prime Minister: Margaret Thatcher
- Preceded by: Tom McNally
- Succeeded by: Derek Howe

Member of the House of Lords
- Lord Temporal
- Life peerage 22 November 1997 – 12 April 2021

Personal details
- Born: Richard Andrew Ryder; 4 February 1949 (age 77)
- Party: Conservative
- Education: Magdalene College, Cambridge

Richard Andrew Ryder, Baron Ryder of Wensum, OBE, PC (born 4 February 1949) is a British Conservative Party politician. A former Member of Parliament (MP) and government minister, he was made a life peer in 1997 and was a member of the House of Lords from 1997 to 2021.

== Early life ==
Born 4 February 1949, Ryder was educated at Radley College and Magdalene College, Cambridge.

In the 1981 Birthday Honours Ryder was appointed an Officer of the Order of the British Empire (OBE), for political service.

== Parliamentary career ==
Having unsuccessfully fought the Labour seat of Gateshead East in February and October 1974, Ryder was elected at the 1983 general election as MP for the Mid Norfolk constituency. From 1990 to 1995, he was the government's Chief Whip. This period includes the Conservative backbench rebellion over the Maastricht Treaty. The maverick MPs, known as the Maastricht Rebels, were under intense pressure from the government whips but still brought the administration of John Major close to collapse.

Ryder retired from the House of Commons at the 1997 general election, and was created a life peer as Baron Ryder of Wensum, of Wensum in the County of Norfolk on 22 November 1997. He retired from the Lords on 12 April 2021.

== Outside Parliament ==
He became Vice-Chairman of the BBC on 1 January 2002 for a four-year term.

Ryder was appointed Acting Chairman of the BBC following the resignation of Gavyn Davies on 28 January 2004. Davies resigned following the criticism of the BBC in the Hutton Report, which was set up to investigate "the circumstances surrounding the death of Dr David Kelly". One of Ryder's first acts as chairman was to give a televised statement, during which he offered an unreserved apology for the mistakes made during the Dr. Kelly affair. This apology was criticised by many, including departing Director General, Greg Dyke, as overdone. In the same statement Ryder announced that the process to select a new Chairman had begun, and that he would not be putting his name forward. Michael Grade was appointed on 2 April 2004 and took up his post on 17 May; Ryder resumed the post of Vice-Chairman.

Ryder resigned early on 1 August 2004, after which the position was assumed by Anthony Salz.

Ryder was the Chairman of the Institute of Cancer Research, and is a director of Ipswich Town F.C.

== Family ==
A nephew of Sue Ryder, later Baroness Ryder and Cheshire, he married in 1981 Caroline Stephens CVO, MBE, only daughter of Sir David Stephens and Clemency Gore-Browne.

Lord and Lady Ryder of Wensum had two children.

Government offices
Preceded by Tom McNally	Political Secretary to the Prime Minister; 1979–1981	Succeeded by Derek Howe
Parliament of the United Kingdom
Preceded by Constituency reestablished	Member of Parliament for Mid Norfolk; 1983–1997	Succeeded by Keith Simpson
Political offices
Preceded by Peter Lilley	Economic Secretary to the Treasury; 1989	Succeeded by John Maples
Preceded by The Earl of Caithness	Paymaster General; 1990	Succeeded by The Lord Belstead
Preceded by Tim Renton	Chief Whip of the Conservative Party; 1990–1995	Succeeded by Alastair Goodlad
Preceded by Tim Renton	Parliamentary Secretary to the Treasury; 1990–1995	Succeeded by Alastair Goodlad
Media offices
Preceded by Gavyn Davies	Vice Chairman of the BBC Board of Governors; 2002–2004	Succeeded by Anthony Salz
Preceded by Gavyn Davies	Chairman of the BBC Board of Governors; Acting; 2004	Succeeded by Michael Grade
Orders of precedence in the United Kingdom
Preceded by The Lord Watson of Invergowrie	Gentlemen; Baron Ryder of Wensum	Followed by The Lord Butler of Brockwell
