= Angela Sarkis =

BBC Governor (born 1955)

Angela Sarkis CBE (born 1955), was the Chief Executive of the Nurture Group Network, a charitable organisation which promotes and supports the development of specialist support for vulnerable children within mainstream education. She is also a board member of the Youth Justice Board for England and Wales.

A former BBC Governor (2002–2006), she was also formerly a member of the House of Lords Appointments Commission. She has held senior leadership roles with charitable organisations including the DIVERT Trust, Church Urban Fund and YMCA England.

Sarkis is an advisor to the Ascension Trust, which established the Street Pastors initiative in 2003. She was appointed a CBE in 2000.
