= Alan Hart (television executive) =

British television executive (1935–2021)

- Born: 17 April 1935; United Kingdom
- Died: 15 January 2021 (aged 85)
- Title: Controller of BBC1 (1981–1984)

Alan Hart (17 April 1935 – 15 January 2021) was a British television executive, who from 1981 to 1984 was the controller of BBC One.

== Career ==
Hart's initial career was in the BBC sports department as editor of Grandstand in the late 1960s and for much of the 1970s, and he rose through the ranks to become BBC head of sport in 1977. In 1981, BBC One controller Bill Cotton was promoted, and Hart was chosen to succeed him.

As channel controller, Hart was responsible for managing the direction, content and commissioning of programmes on the BBC's premier television station. Hart greenlit the BBC's first all-year round twice-weekly drama in modern times, EastEnders, which became a runaway success even though Hart had moved on by the time it began broadcasting in February 1985. One of Hart's early decisions in the role was taking Doctor Who off its long-standing early Saturday evening slot, and giving it an early evening, twice-weekly slot, beginning in 1982. Hart also green-lit a 90-minute special to celebrate the show's 20th anniversary, which became "The Five Doctors" and was broadcast as part of Children in Need.

Hart's tenure as controller of BBC One was not generally regarded as one of the most successful in the BBC's history, largely because of the huge success enjoyed by ITV drama during that period. In 1984, Hart was replaced by Michael Grade, who had expressed a desire to return from working in the US to work for the BBC, and Grade proceeded to radically overhaul the BBC's main channel.

Hart died in January 2021 at the age of 85.

Media offices
Preceded by Bill Cotton	Controller of BBC1; 1981–1984	Succeeded by Michael Grade
