= Muzz (dating app) =

Muslim dating app

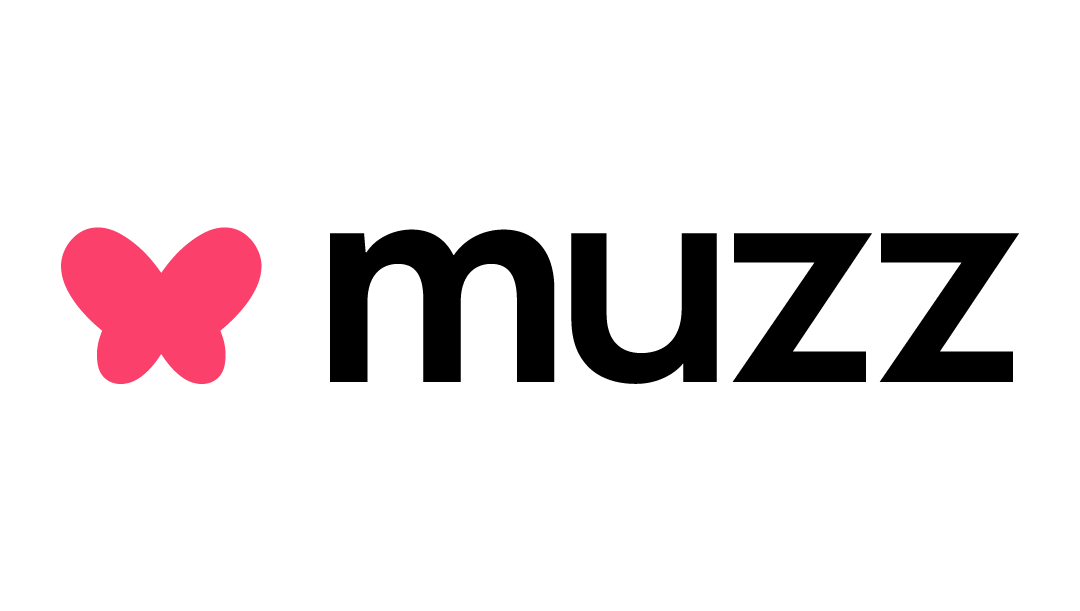
- Original author: Shahzad Younas
- Release: March 4, 2015; 11 years ago
- Operating system: iOS, Android
- Available in: Arabic, Bengali, Dutch, English, French, German, Hindi, Indonesian, Malay, Persian, Russian, Spanish, Turkish, Urdu languages
- Type: Online dating application
- Website: muzz.com

Muzz, formerly known as Muzmatch, is a Muslim-focused matchmaking and dating app founded in 2015 by Shahzad Younas. It is based in Aldgate, London. The app is designed to help Muslim singles find potential marriage partners while staying within their religious and cultural norms. With over 21 million users, Muzz claims to have facilitated 800,000 marriages.

== History ==
In 2014, Younas quit his 9-year banking career at Morgan Stanley and taught himself how to code, investing all of his savings in starting up the business. He built the initial app himself.

Muzz was founded with an aim to provide a modern solution to Muslim matchmaking that respects Islamic values. It quickly gained traction, securing funding from Y Combinator and other investors. Significant milestones include hitting one million users in 2016, and rebranding from Muzmatch to Muzz in 2022 following a legal dispute.

The site employed a pay-as-you-go mechanism for its members. It allowed complete anonymity for all of its members, with all profile pictures initially blurred, allowing only those "seriously" looking to find a bride or groom to pay a small amount to access a full, detailed profile description and picture.

Muzz offers various features tailored to Muslim singles, including detailed profile creation, selfie verification, privacy settings, and a chaperone feature that allows a third party to monitor interactions. The app also includes a video calling feature introduced during the COVID-19 pandemic.

In 2016, the platform introduced selfie verification to ensure everyone on the app is verified. The company had a moderation team in Bangladesh, which, alongside its HQ in Aldgate, manually moderated every profile.

In the summer of 2017, Muzmatch was accepted into the Silicon Valley–based accelerator Y Combinator.

In 2017, Muzmatch raised a total of $1.75 million in its initial seed round, led by Fabrice Grinda's FJ Labs, Y Combinator, and London-based venture firm Hambro Perks. Muzmatch reported having 200,000 members spread across 160 countries, and over 6,000 couples who met on the platform.

In April 2019, Muzmatch was shortlisted for "App of the Year" at the Evening Standard Business Awards. It was also a 2019 London and the South finalist at The Spectator Business Awards. In July 2019, Muzmatch raised $7 million in its Series A round of funding, and reported having over 1.5 million users of its app and over 30,000 successes. The funding was jointly led by U.S. hedge fund Luxor Capital and Y Combinator.

In July 2020, Muzmatch welcomed its three millionth user. The company claims it took four years to get to one million members and another year to reach two million.

The Match Group took Muzmatch to court in February 2021, alleging that the inclusion of the word "match" allowed the app to unfairly benefit from the reputation of popular dating site Match.com. This was reportedly after a series of attempts by the Match Group to purchase Muzmatch for as much as $35 million in 2019. In April 2022, London courts sided with the Match Group.

Following the ruling in the Match Group's favour at the UK IPEC Court, Muzmatch rebranded to Muzz and launched a revamped app in May 2022.

In 2020, during the COVID-19 pandemic, Muzz released a free in-app video calling feature.

In 2024, Muzz reported having over 10 million members, more than 500,000 success stories, and a team of 110 employees.

As of 2026, Muzz reported over 21 million members globally and celebrated over 800,000 successes on the platform.

== Reception ==
The app has received mixed reviews. While many users appreciate its respect for Islamic values and modern approach to matchmaking, others have raised concerns about privacy, moderation, and the effectiveness of its features. Although the app has been recognized with several awards, it has also faced criticism in various reviews.

== Marketing ==
The company ran a viral tongue-in-cheek marketing campaign across the London Underground tube network and the Manchester and Birmingham bus network. The ads incorporated halal-inspired puns such as "Halal, is it me you're looking for?".

In 2019, the company launched a Brexit-themed marketing campaign on the London Underground. Ads with the message "Time to Leave the Single Market?" ran just as the UK population began to consider its options ahead of a December general election.

In Jan 2022, Muzz, in collaboration with a British single Muslim, launched a billboard campaign to "Find Malik a wife," which ran across London, Birmingham, and Manchester. The campaign went viral, being covered across hundreds of news outlets and television programmes. Malik himself communicated with a number of singles who reached out to him via the website. Over 5000 people completed the application form. The reveal stage showed the link between Malik and Muzz, with the humorous tagline "We'll say we met at the mosque".
