= Bill Cotton =

British television producer and executive (1928–2008)

Sir Bill Cotton CBE
- Born: William Frederick Cotton; 23 April 1928; London, England
- Died: 11 August 2008 (aged 80); Bournemouth, Dorset, England
- Occupations: Television producer; executive
- Title: BBC head of light entertainment (1970–1977); Controller of BBC1 (1977–1981)
- Spouses: Bernadine Maud Sinclair (m. 1950; died 1964) Ann Corfield Bucknall (m. 1965; div. 1989) Kathryn Mary Ralphs (m. 1990)
- Father: Billy Cotton
- Relatives: Fearne Cotton (cousin)

Sir William Frederick Cotton CBE (23 April 1928 – 11 August 2008) was a British television producer and executive, and the son of dance band leader Billy Cotton. The television and radio presenter Fearne Cotton is related to him, as he was her paternal grandfather's cousin.

== Early life ==
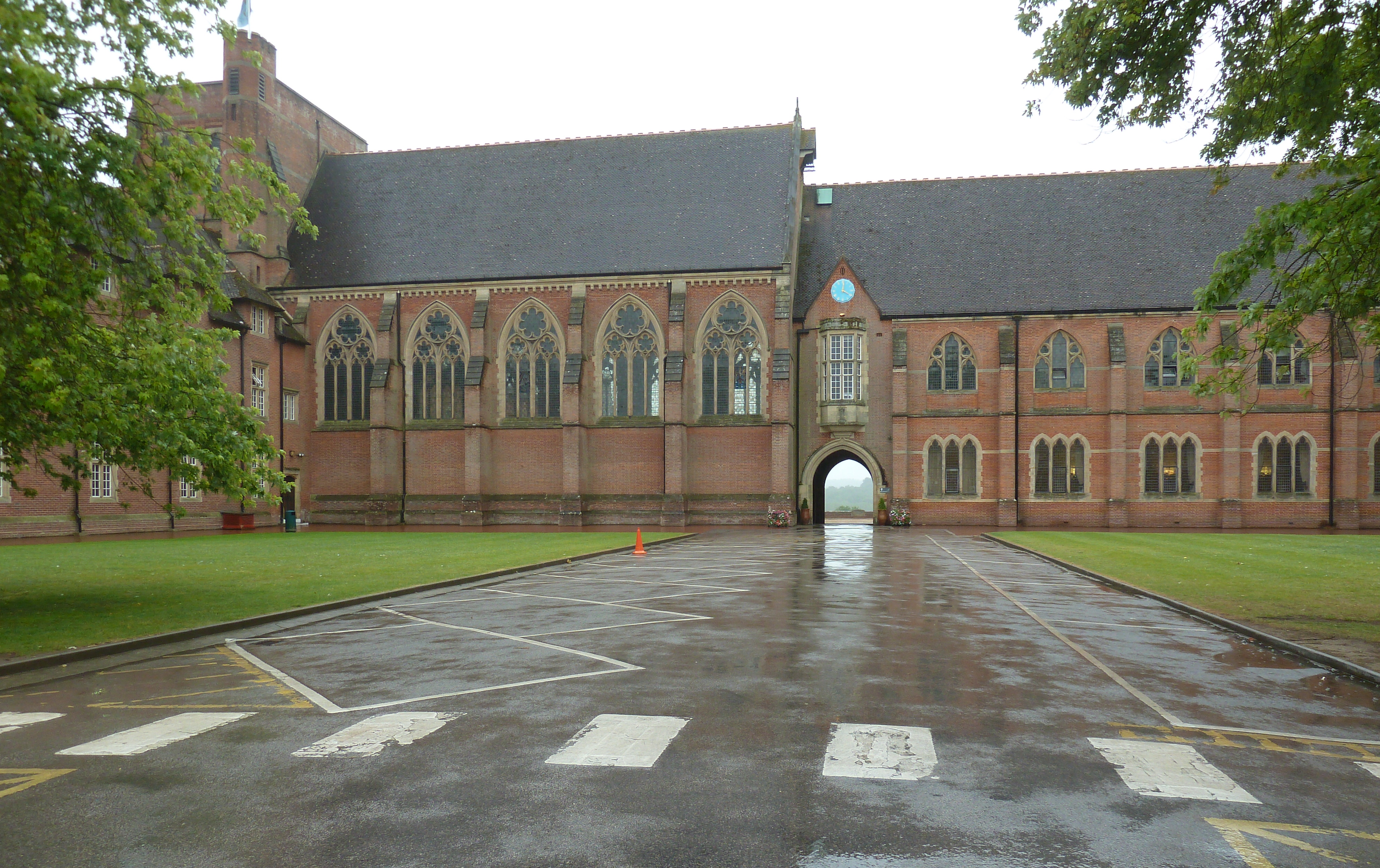
Ardingly College

Following a secondary education at the independent school Ardingly College, he joined the Royal Army Service Corps as a transport officer. He joined BBC Television as an in-house producer of light entertainment programmes in 1956, working on various programmes such as his father's Billy Cotton Band Show and popular music programme Six-Five Special.

== Professional career ==
In 1970, Cotton was promoted to head of light entertainment, following the death of Tom Sloan in May. In this position, Cotton was responsible for overseeing the production of a whole series of popular variety and light entertainment shows, including Jim'll Fix It (1975–1994) The Morecambe and Wise Show (1968–77), Monty Python's Flying Circus (1969–74), The Two Ronnies (1971–87), Bruce Forsyth and the Generation Game (first run 1971–77), Look: Mike Yarwood (1971–76) and Parkinson (first run 1971–82). Cotton's era was generally seen as the most eclectic in the history of BBC light entertainment, with programmes such as Morecambe and Wise becoming icons of British popular culture and drawing huge audiences, while the more subversive Monty Python provided a more cutting-edge, contemporary and daring complement.

Cotton's success as head of light entertainment led to his promotion to controller of BBC1, the corporation's premier and the UK's oldest television station, in 1977. He oversaw some of the channel's highest-ever audience figures in 1979, although this was mostly due to the main opposition, ITV, being on strike for over two months.

In 1981, he was replaced as controller of BBC1 by Alan Hart and made the BBC's deputy managing director of television under Alasdair Milne. In 1984, Cotton was promoted to become managing director of television, a role he fulfilled until his retirement from the corporation in 1988. During this final period at the BBC he was involved with Michael Grade and Jonathan Powell in the attempted cancellation of Doctor Who in 1985 after a run of 22 years on the BBC, a decision which became an 18-month hiatus following a tabloid backlash (the series wasn't completely axed until 1989). Cotton subsequently did some freelance executive producing work in the light entertainment area and served as chairman of Noel Gay Television. He was deputy chairman of Meridian Broadcasting from 1992 to 1996, then chairman until 2001.

== Personal life ==
In 1950, Cotton married Bernardine Maud ("Boo"; 1926–1964), daughter of Bernard Charles Henry Sinclair; they had three daughters. He married secondly, in 1965, makeup supervisor Ann Corfield Henderson, daughter of Lieutenant General Gerard Bucknall and former wife of Andrew V. Henderson. They had no children and divorced in 1989. He married thirdly, in 1990, Marie Curie Foundation homes officer Kathryn Mary ("Kate"), daughter of chief education officer Frederick Ralphs and former wife of David P. H. Burgess.

== Honours ==
Cotton was appointed Officer of the Order of the British Empire (OBE) in the 1976 New Year Honours, and promoted to Commander of the same order (CBE) in the 1989 Birthday Honours.

He received a BAFTA Fellowship in 1998, and was knighted in the 2001 Birthday Honours for services to Television Broadcasting and Marie Curie Cancer Care.

He was the subject of This Is Your Life in 1995 when he was surprised by Michael Aspel at Castle Ashby in Northamptonshire. Guests included Paul Fox, Brian Tesler, Michael Grade, and Billy Marsh.

BBC Two broadcast an evening of programmes that he commissioned as part of a tribute night to him on Boxing Day 2008, including the Morecambe & Wise Christmas Show of 1971, The Generation Game Christmas Show of 1973, and The Two Ronnies Old Fashioned Christmas Mystery of 1973. There was also a documentary about his career with Michael Grade, Bruce Forsyth, Michael Parkinson, Ronnie Corbett, Terry Wogan, and Paul Jackson among those paying tribute, in addition to this a two-part documentary about his life and career was broadcast on BBC Radio 2 on New Year's Eve 2008 and New Year's Day 2009 presented by Paul O'Grady.

== Portrayal ==
Cotton was played by Michael Jibson in The Reckoning (2023).

Cultural offices
Preceded by Paul Fox	President of the Royal Television Society; 1992–1995	Succeeded by Michael Grade
Media offices
Preceded by Bryan Cowgill	Controller of BBC1; 1977–1981	Succeeded by Alan Hart
