= Erik Huggers =

Dutch media executive

Erik Huggers is a media executive who was CEO of video hosting service Vevo. He previously worked at Microsoft, Endemol, the BBC, and at OnCue, Intel's Internet TV effort that was acquired by Verizon.

== Early life and education ==
Huggers hails from the Netherlands.

== Career ==
=== Microsoft and Endemol ===
Huggers has worked in managerial roles at Microsoft and Endemol.

=== BBC ===
Huggers joined the BBC in May 2007, and was appointed director of the future, media and technology arm in August 2008, replacing Ashley Highfield. During his time at the BBC, Huggers and his team refocused the BBC's online and technology strategy, launched iPlayer and revamped the BBC's online presence. He was credited with bringing order amidst chaos and infighting, helped by his outside perspective, while causing discontent among people for his macho attitude, leading to many being happy to see him leave.

Huggers was also the subject of controversy when he submitted reimbursement requests for taxi rides for thousands of pounds, including £639 for a single day of taxi rides.

Huggers' departure was announced in January 2011, and his role was split into two, with John Linwood taking over technology and Ralph Rivera taking over digital media.

=== Intel (OnCue) and Verizon ===
After leaving the BBC, Huggers became corporate vice-president and general manager of the digital home group of chip maker Intel. In that role, he led OnCue, Intel's Internet TV effort.

In January 2014, it was announced that Verizon was acquiring OnCue, and Huggers would become a senior vice president at Verizon.

=== Vevo ===
In late April, 2015, it was announced that Huggers was joining video hosting service Vevo as CEO, taking over from Rio Caraeff, Vevo's founding CEO, who left at the end of 2014. Huggers worked from Vevo's New York City headquarters.

In his role as CEO, Huggers initially planned to focus on launching a paid subscription. However, he deferred that goal in order to focus on international expansion of its localized website and apps, to better cater to the 80% of its users who were accessing its content from outside the United States (mostly through partners such as YouTube). Huggers identified as one of his main challenges making people aware of and engaged with the Vevo brand directly; as of now the majority of views of Vevo videos happen on the YouTube platform.

On December 15, 2017, Vevo announced that Huggers was resigning as CEO, and Alan Price, the CFO, would be interim CEO while the Board was looking for a replacement. Price had played a similar role of interim CEO after the departure of founding CEO Rio Caraeff.
