= Dominic Shorthouse =

British investor

- Occupations: Private investor, founder of Englefield Capital LLP
- Known for: Channel 5, Cognita

Dominic Shorthouse is a British private investor, founder of private equity business Englefield Capital LLP and a former partner at Warburg Pincus. His notable investments include the creation of the UK terrestrial TV channel Channel 5 and Cognita, a UK-based private schools operator. He is a member of the advisory board of ManoCap, which invests in post-conflict African states, and a member of the Advisory Board of Lennox Investment Management, investing in prime Central London residential property.

== Early life and career ==
Shorthouse graduated from the University of Oxford with a master's degree in Latin and Greek literature and philosophy, and holds an MBA from the Stanford Graduate School of Business. Prior to Stanford, Shorthouse worked in the investment-banking group at Morgan Stanley and in 1987 interned at Golder, Thoma & Cressey in Chicago.

== Warburg Pincus ==
Before founding Englefield, Shorthouse was a partner at global private equity firm Warburg Pincus. From the mid-1990s, he served as co-head of Warburg's London office and made several notable deals, including a founding investment in Channel 5, the sale of mortgage broker John Charcol to Bradford and Bingley for £100m and deals in Aegis, London Weekend Television and Esprit Telecom.

Shorthouse was a non-executive director of several Warburg portfolio companies. Overall, he was involved in the investment of over $2 billion in the UK and Europe, in sectors such as financial services, manufacturing, real estate, sport, and technology, media and telecommunications.

== Channel 5 ==
While at Warburg, Shorthouse participated in the winning bid to create Channel 5, the final terrestrial television network to launch on British TV. Shorthouse worked on the bid alongside Lord Hollick, Greg Dyke and Ferd Kayser.

Channel 5's licence to broadcast was awarded under a controversial auction process conducted by the Independent Television Commission (ITC). The winning bid vehicle, named Channel 5 Broadcasting Ltd, offered £22,002,000 for the licence, exactly the same amount as a rival bid from Virgin Television. The ITC decision was later contested in the High Court by Virgin and other rival bidders. Appellants claimed that the ITC had been "...guilty of procedural impropriety", particularly that the ITC had unfairly allowed Channel 5 Broadcasting Ltd to increase its programme funding by £100m four months after the deadline for bids had closed, and that the ITC had "...irrationally failed" Virgin's application on programme quality grounds. The High Court dismissed all claims and denied Virgin further leave to appeal.

In 1999 Warburg Pincus sold its 18% shareholding to Channel 5’s three other shareholders, Pearson, CLT-ufa and United News & Media, for a reported £180m.

== Englefield Capital ==
In 2002 Shorthouse founded Englefield Capital, a European mid-market private equity house. Englefield’s initial partner was Etienne de Villiers, a former president at Walt Disney Television International. The firm's inaugural fund closed at €706 million, including a €650 million commitment from Bregal Investments LP, an investment vehicle owned by the Brenninkmeijer family, owners of the C&A retail chain. The balance came from AXA, Shell, Delta Lloyd Group and around 150 individual investors. Englefield’s advisory board included former head of NATO Lord Robertson, former CEO of Rolls-Royce Sir John Rose, CEO of Reed Elsevier Sir Crispin Davis and Paul Myners, former UK Treasury Minister.

Under Shorthouse, Englefield's investments included the creation of international schools business Cognita, the purchase of insurance company Canopius and an investment in renewable energy company Zephyr. Following the investment in Zephyr, Englefield set up a separate €200m fund raised from Bregal for renewable energy investments.

In 2009 the Brenninkmeijer family negotiated with Shorthouse to acquire Englefield's investments for its private equity subsidiary, Bregal Investments. Shorthouse retained the rights to the Englefield name and continues as a private investor.

== Hambro Perks Acquisition Company (SPAC) ==
In November 2021 the Financial Times reported that Shorthouse had joined the board of Hambro Perks Acquisition Company, the first-ever Special-purpose acquisition company (SPAC) to be listed on the London Stock Exchange.

== Other commercial interests ==
Shorthouse is a member of the advisory board of Lennox Investment Management.

== Personal life ==
Shorthouse works with a number of charities. He serves on the board of the Amber Foundation, a charity which seeks to reduce the impact of unemployment among the 17-30 age group; he is also Chair of Trustees of the Anna Freud, a large charity researching and supporting child and adolescent mental health.

Debrett's People of Today lists Shorthouse’s interests as golf, skiing, reading and equitation. He is a managing partner in an organic farm in Tillac, France.
