= BBC Trust =

Former governing body of the BBC (2007–2017)

- Logo used from 2007 to 2017
- Predecessor: Board of Governors of the BBC
- Successor: BBC Board; Ofcom
- Formation: 1 January 2007; 19 years ago
- Dissolved: 2 April 2017; 9 years ago
- Headquarters: 180 Great Portland Street, London
- Chairman: Rona Fairhead
- Vice Chairman: Sir Roger Carr
- Board of directors: Sonita Alleyne; Richard Ayre; Mark Damazer; Mark Florman; Bill Matthews; Aideen McGinley; Nicholas Prettejohn; Elan Closs Stephens; Suzanna Taverne; Lord Williams of Baglan
- Website: bbc.co.uk/bbctrust

The BBC Trust was the governing body of the British Broadcasting Corporation (BBC) between 2007 and 2017. It was operationally independent of BBC management and external bodies, and its stated aim was to make decisions in the best interests of licence-fee payers. On 12 May 2016, it was announced in the House of Commons that, under the next royal charter, the regulatory functions of the BBC Trust were to be transferred to Ofcom.

The trust was established by the 2007 BBC Charter, which came into effect on 1 January in that year. The trust, and a formalised Executive Board, replaced the former Board of Governors. The decision to establish the trust followed the Hutton Inquiry, which had heavily criticised the BBC for its coverage of the death of David Kelly; Labour's political opponents, as well as large numbers of its supporters, saw the Hutton Inquiry as a whitewash, designed to deflect criticism from Tony Blair's government.

In summary, the main roles of the Trust are in setting the overall strategic direction of the BBC, including its priorities, and in exercising a general oversight of the work of the Executive Board. The Trust will perform these roles in the public interest, particularly the interest of licence fee payers. — BBC Royal Charter (2006)

The BBC Trust closed on 2 April 2017 at the expiry of the 2007 royal Charter, which had a 10-year lifespan. Labour had lost power in 2010, and other political parties had established a parliamentary majority by the time it came to the moment for a new royal charter to be written. Governance of the BBC was transferred to the new BBC Board in April 2017, with Ofcom assuming regulatory duties.

== Trustees ==
The royal charter established that the trust should have twelve trustees, including a chairman, a vice-chairman and a member for each of the Home Nations of the United Kingdom. Appointments to the BBC Trust were made by Queen-in-Council, on the recommendation of UK government ministers.

The final BBC Trust membership comprised:

- Rona Fairhead – chairman of the BBC Trust; former chief executive of the Financial Times Group
- Sir Roger Carr – vice-chairman of the BBC Trust; chairman of BAE Systems
- Sonita Alleyne – a former radio executive.
- Richard Ayre – former deputy chief executive of BBC News.
- Mark Damazer – Master of St Peter's College, Oxford and former controller of BBC Radio 4 and BBC Radio 7.
- Mark Florman – the Trustee for England; co-founder and former CEO of the merchant banking group Maizels, Westerberg & Co.
- Bill Matthews – the Trustee for Scotland.
- Aideen McGinley – the Trustee for Northern Ireland; a former NI civil servant.
- Nicholas Prettejohn – a senior City executive.
- Elan Closs Stephens – the Trustee for Wales; a former chairman of Welsh-language broadcaster S4C.
- Suzanna Taverne – a former managing director of the British Museum.
- Lord Williams of Baglan – a former diplomat, appointed as International Trustee.

Trustees served for terms of up to five years (usually four), after which they could be re-appointed.

=== Former members ===
Other people who served as members of the BBC Trust:

- Michael Grade, now Lord Grade of Yarmouth – former chairman, left the BBC to become executive chairman of ITV plc.
- Dermot Gleeson – finished two terms, as a BBC governor and a BBC trustee.
- Richard Tait – finished two terms, as a BBC governor and a BBC trustee.
- Chitra Bharucha – former vice chairman, and acting chairman; retired after one term.
- Alison Hastings – former National Trustee for England; finished two terms, a former regional newspaper editor.
- Janet Lewis-Jones – former National Trustee for Wales; retired after one term.
- David Liddiment – finished two terms, a former director of programmes at ITV.
- Jeremy Peat – former National Trustee for Scotland; finished two terms, as a BBC Governor and a BBC Trustee.
- Sir Michael Lyons – former chairman; retired after one term.
- Dame Patricia Hodgson – who resigned to take up a position on the board of media regulator Ofcom.
- Rotha Johnston – finished two terms as BBC trustee for Northern Ireland.
- Mehmuda Mian – finished two terms as BBC trustee.
- Anthony Fry – stood down from the trust in the middle of his second term to join the Premier League as chairman.
- Chris Patten – former chairman, resigned mid-term after heart surgery.
- Diane Coyle – finished two terms as a BBC trustee and vice-chairman of the BBC Trust.

== Chairman ==
The trust was originally to be chaired by Michael Grade, the then chairman of the board of governors. However, in November 2006 before the trust formally took over from the governors as the governing body of the corporation, Grade left the BBC to become executive chairman of ITV. Chitra Bharucha, then vice-chairman, became the acting chairman.

Sir Michael Lyons, a former Labour local government chief executive, was subsequently appointed the first permanent chairman of the BBC Trust, taking up the position from 1 May 2007. In September 2010 Sir Michael wrote to the secretary of state, Jeremy Hunt, stating that he did not wish to be considered for a second term as chairman. This was a surprise as he was previously on record as 'being up for' a second term. Lyons stood down from the post in April 2011.

Following a recruitment process led by the government, the Conservative peer Chris Patten was appointed to the role and began a four-year term on 1 May 2011. Following heart surgery, he resigned in May 2014. He was replaced by the vice chairman, Diane Coyle, in an acting capacity until a new chairman was selected. On 31 August 2014 it was announced that Rona Fairhead would become the new chairman of the trust.

== Remuneration of trustees ==
The remuneration for BBC Trustees was determined by the Department for Culture, Media and Sport and paid for by the BBC. The table below shows the base fees for Trustees during 2014–15.

Position	Base Fee
Chairman	£110,000
Vice-chairman	£70,610
National Trustees	£37,660
Trustee	£32,952

The chairman is expected to spend 3 days a week on trust business, and the vice-chairman up to 2 days. Other trustees are expected to spend 1–2 days a week. Since 2010 BBC Trust members have been taking an 8.3% reduction in fees (equivalent to one month's pay).

In October 2010 the government announced that the fee for the chairman of the BBC Trust would be reduced from £143,000 to £110,000.

== The trust's work ==
In October 2007, the trust approved the BBC's strategic direction for the next six years, demanding a high-quality and more distinctive BBC.

The trust has approved several new services, including the iPlayer, HDTV and the Gaelic Digital Service, BBC Alba. The trust denied a proposal to launch a new local video service in late 2008 due to concerns about competition with commercial producers, especially newspapers moving online. The trust has also recently demanded that the BBC makes more programmes outside London.

In May 2008 the trust published its review of the BBC's website (bbc.co.uk), criticising the service for financial mismanagement, including a £36 million overspend. The departure of Ashley Highfield, Director of the BBC's technology department has been linked to the findings of the review. In June 2008, the trust was highly critical of the BBC's network news reporting of issues in Scotland, Northern Ireland, and Wales.

The trust was heavily criticised in the popular press for its review of the amount the BBC pays for "top talent" and failing to answer whether stars like Jonathan Ross and Graham Norton were value for money. Ross was reported to earn £6 million a year.

=== 2009 Editorial Standards Committee report ===
In April 2009, the Editorial Standards Committee (ESC) of the BBC Trust published a report into three complaints brought against two news items involving Middle East editor Jeremy Bowen. The report received widespread coverage in the UK and in Israel.

The complaints included 24 allegations of breaching BBC guidelines on accuracy or impartiality of which three were fully or partially upheld. The Independent's Middle East correspondent Robert Fisk was particularly critical of the ESC report, saying that the BBC Trust is "now a mouthpiece for the Israeli lobby". An editorial in The Independent said that the report demonstrated "a terrible absence of good judgement". Michael Lyons' response to the editorial, also published in The Independent, said that it is important to take complaints seriously and to be scrupulously careful about standards of accuracy and impartiality so that the BBC's reputation for fairness and impartiality is maintained.

== Fate of the trust ==
The concept of the BBC Trust came under severe political criticism once the Labour government had left power, in 2010. Both the Conservative Party and the Liberal Democrats – the main parliamentary parties other than Labour – were highly critical of the trust model, stating that it had "failed". Both parties favoured some kind of external regulation of the BBC.

Despite some early rhetoric about abolishing the trust, the then Culture Secretary, Jeremy Hunt, made clear that he would only act within the envelope set by the BBC Charter, so major changes were not possible until the charter expired after the end of 2016. Mr Hunt instead expressed his support for changing the name of the trust and installing a new non-executive chairman on the BBC's executive board.

The next Culture Secretary, Maria Miller, had not made clear a position on whether the BBC Trust would exist under the next BBC Charter, although it was widely expected that there would be some form of management and governance re-structure.

On 1 March 2016, an independent review by Sir David Clementi was published, which recommended that the BBC Trust be disbanded. Citing previous controversies involving the BBC, such as its handling of the Jimmy Savile sexual abuse scandal, a Newsnight report which falsely implied that Lord McAlpine of West Green was involved in child abuse (due to mistaken identity), controversies involving Russell Brand and Jonathan Ross, and other internal issues, he concluded that the trust was "flawed" and unable to sufficiently self-regulate. He suggested that the BBC be overseen by a unitary board "charged with responsibility for meeting the obligations placed on it under the royal charter and agreement, and responsibility for the interests of licence fee payers", and that Ofcom take on the BBC's regulatory oversight. Clementi stated that his proposal would give the BBC "no hiding place", and explained that "no good governance system will ever guarantee good outcomes, but if you have a single board with a good governance system, you know who's responsible. One of the difficulties in those cases was it wasn't quite clear if the trust were dealing with it or whether the executive board were dealing with it. It fell to both of them and neither of them."

The proposal to scrap the trust was officially presented to Parliament as part of a charter review white paper on 12 May 2016.

Governance of the BBC was transferred to the new BBC Board in April 2017. Sir David Clementi became the new chairman of the board.

== The Trust Unit ==
The trust was supported by a team of 70 staff, known as the Trust Unit. These staff were independent from the BBC Executive and included specialists in audience research, performance analysis, and finance. At the time the Trust was disbanded, the Trust Unit was headed by Alex Towers.

== Audience councils ==
The BBC Trust had four audience councils, which provided advice to the trust on the views of the audience in each Nation of the UK. The four councils were:

- Audience Council England
- Audience Council Scotland
- Audience Council Wales
- Audience Council Northern Ireland

== See also ==
- BBC Charter
