= Anthony Fry (business executive) =

British business executive

Anthony Fry is a British business executive. He was appointed a trustee of the BBC in 2008, and appointed for a second term in July 2012. In 2013 he succeeded Dave Richards as chairman of the Premier League. He resigned in June 2014 following a stroke.
