= David Hume Institute =

Independent research institute in Scotland

Coordinates: 55°57′03″N 3°12′21″W

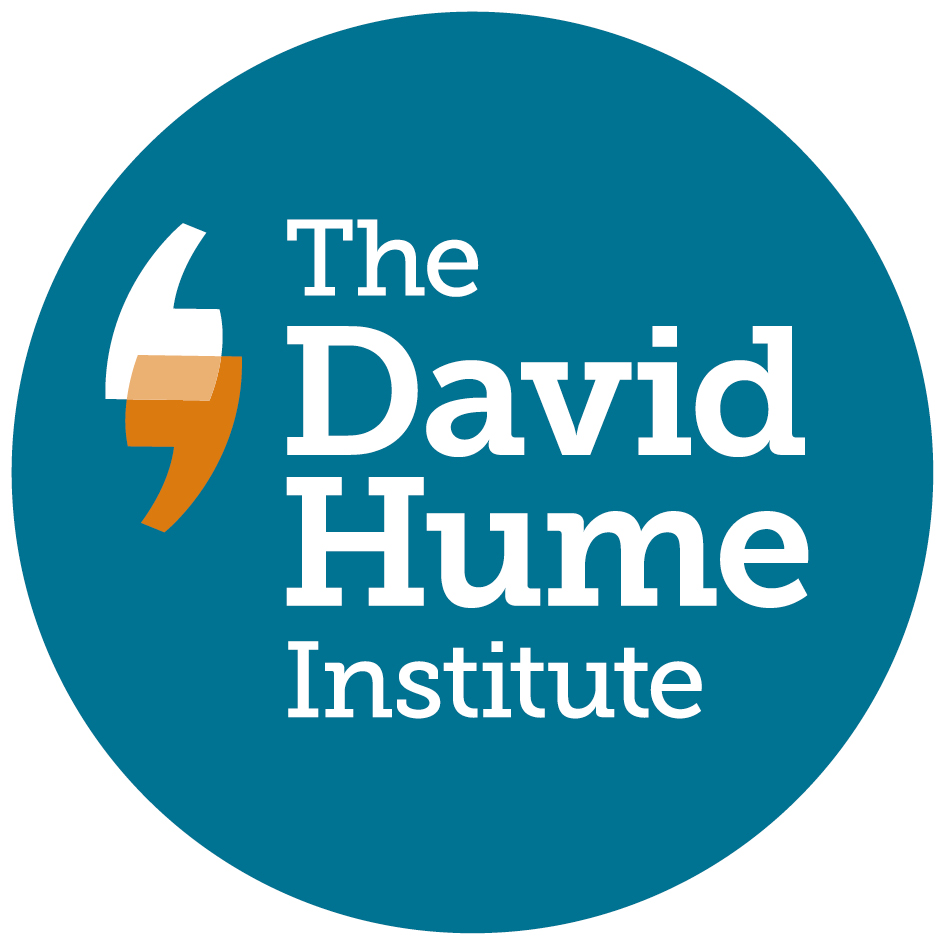
- Abbreviation: DHI
- Formation: 1985; 41 years ago
- Founder: Sir Alan Peacock and Sir Gerald Elliot
- Chair: Professor Paul Atkinson
- Director: Susan Murray
- Website: davidhumeinstitute.org

The David Hume Institute (DHI) is an independent research institute based in Scotland with a focus on the economy and society. It is a registered charity established in 1985 by individuals including Sir Alan Peacock and Sir Gerald Elliot.

Susan Murray is the current Director of DHI with Professor Paul Atkinson as chair of the board of trustees.

== History ==
In 1984, Sir Alan Peacock, an economist who at the time was the Chairman of the Committee on the Financing of the BBC, set out to establish a distinctively Scottish research institute linking economics and public policy areas while remaining independent of government.

Along with co-founders including Sir Gerald Elliot, a businessman and philanthropist, they chose to name the new institute after David Hume in honour of the philosopher's reputation for skeptical enquiry. Other early contributors included Nick Kuenssberg.

In the following years, DHI established a reputation for undertaking independent research with several dozen books and papers published in its first decades.

The Director since 2019, Susan Murray, has led a wide range of research including on the transfer of risk from institutions to individuals, the diversity of Scotland's top leaders, the legacy of David Hume, and the "Understanding Scotland Economy" tracker. The David Hume Institute originally operated on a membership subscription model but now relies entirely on charitable donations and project grants to fund its work.

Professor Sir Anton Muscatelli, former Principal and Vice-Chancellor of the University of Glasgow, was appointed the Honorary President of DHI in 2014.

== Current research ==
As an independent research institute, DHI primarily engages in research and events concerning Scotland's economy and society. In recent years this has included research to understand 'The Great Risk Transfer' in conjunction with the Institute and Faculty of Actuaries and an investigation into the Scottish housing system by Professor Duncan Maclennan.

Since 2021, DHI has published a quarterly survey of Scottish attitudes towards the economy in collaboration with the Diffley Partnership.

Other recent research papers include Britain's Decision: Facts and Impartial Analysis for the EU Referendum, (2016), Scotland's Productivity Challenge, (2018), Who will do the jobs in Scotland, (2019), Does Team Scotland have the right players? (2020), What's Your Action? (2021), What is open data and why does it matter, Ian Watt (2022).

Following controversy surrounding David Hume's views on race, the David Hume Institute embarked on a National Lottery Heritage Fund project to investigate Hume's legacy and his impact on people today. The project was supported by Professor Sir Geoff Palmer.

== Directors and chairs of the institute ==
=== Directors ===
- Sir Alan Peacock (1985–1991)
- Professor Brian Main (1995–2003)
- Jeremy Peat (2005-14)
- Ray Perman (2014–2019)
- Jane-Frances Kelly (2017-19)
- Susan Murray (2019-present)

=== Chairs/co-chairs ===
- Sir Gerald Elliot (1985–1995)
- Sir John Shaw (1995–2001)
- Lady Eileen Mackay (2001–2008)
- Sir Ian Byatt (2008–2012)
- Professor Hector MacQueen (2012–2015)
- Sir John Elvidge (2015–2021)
- Kenneth Barker (2021–2024)
- Liz Ditchburn (2024–2026)
- Professor Jan Bebbington (2024–2026)
- Professor Paul Atkinson (2026-present)
