= Gavyn Davies =

British businessman (born 1950)

Gavyn Davies OBE
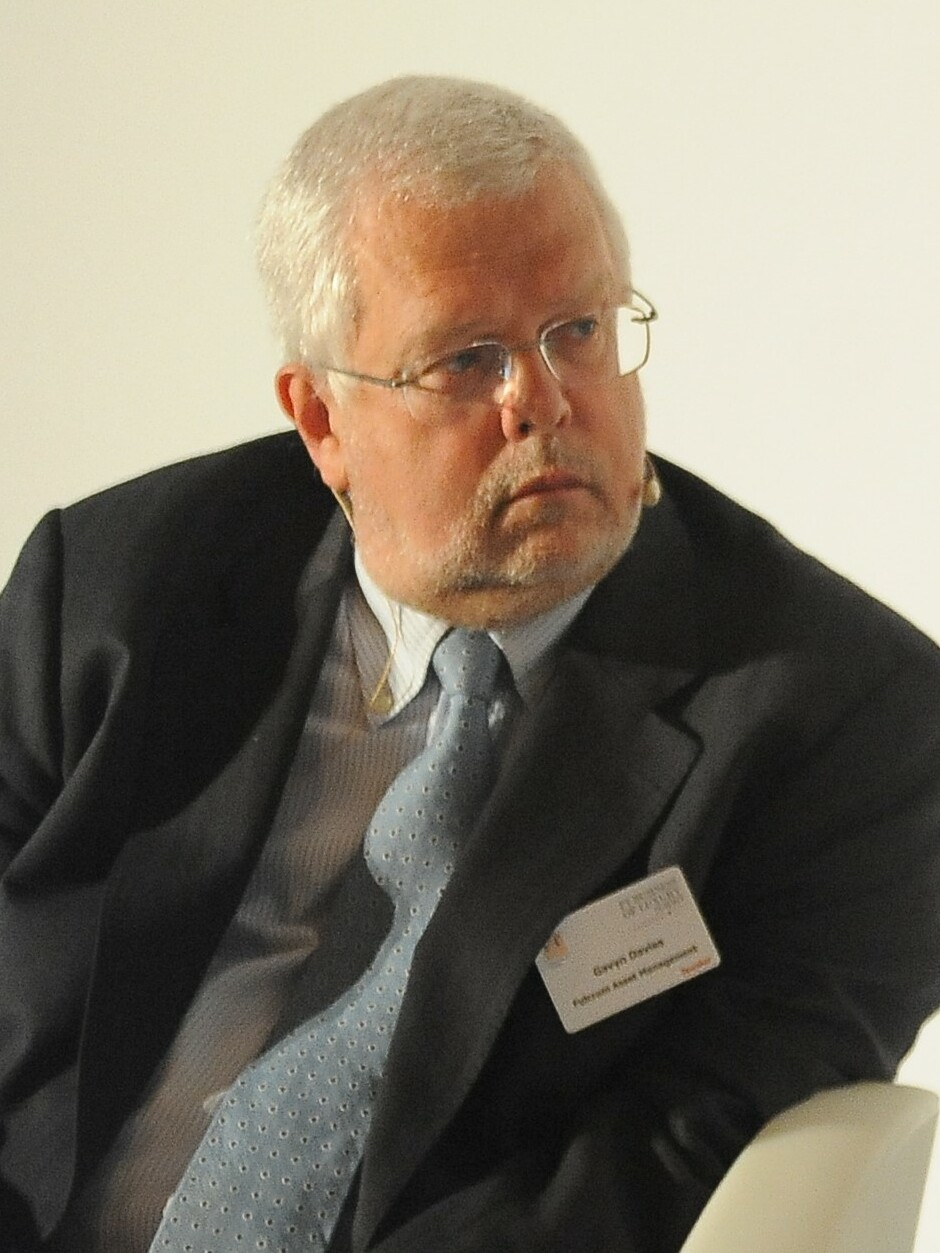
- Davies in 2011
- Born: 27 November 1950 (age 75); Southern Rhodesia
- Education: St John's College, Cambridge
- Known for: Former Chairman of the BBC
- Political party: Labour (until 2001)
- Spouse: Sue Nye
- Children: 1 daughter, 2 sons

Gavyn Davies, OBE (born 27 November 1950) is a former Goldman Sachs partner who was the chairman of the BBC from 2001 until 2004. On 28 January 2004 he announced that he was resigning his BBC post following the publication of the Hutton Inquiry report which heavily criticised the organisation.

== Early life and business career ==
Davies was born in Southern Rhodesia, now Zimbabwe, where his father was head teacher at what was then its only black high school. The family moved to the UK in 1961 where he was educated at Taunton's School, Southampton, St John's College, Cambridge and Balliol College, Oxford, where he conducted research. He worked in Harold Wilson's Policy Unit from 1974 to 1976 and then as an economic advisor to James Callaghan from 1976 to 1979. Afterwards he had stints as Chief Economist at Simon & Coates and Goldman Sachs. He was later promoted to international managing director of the bank. During this time he also served as one of the Chancellor of the Exchequer's "wise men" during the 1992–1997 Parliament.

== BBC inquiry and board membership ==
In 1999 he chaired an inquiry into the future funding of the BBC. His suggestions – to sell off a portion of BBC Worldwide (the corporation's commercial wing) and to raise the television licence fee by around 20% in order to fund new digital channels – were swiftly rejected by the Culture, Media and Sport Select Committee.

In January 2001, he was appointed vice-chairman of the BBC Board of Governors. He was promoted to chairman just 10 months later for a five-year term after being recommended by Tessa Jowell. Upon becoming chairman, Davies resigned his membership of the Labour Party. In January 2004, he resigned from the board after the publication of the Hutton Inquiry which heavily criticised the BBC's news reporting, for which Davies had pledged support. In his resignation statement he said he was "happy to accept ... ultimate responsibility" for everything the BBC does. However, he raised questions about the conclusions of Lord Hutton, including the question of the use of unverifiable sources and possible threats to the freedom of the press.

Davies has in the past donated part of his wealth to the Labour Party, of which he had been a long-term supporter. His appointment as BBC chairman sparked allegations of cronyism from Opposition political parties – Davies' wife Sue Nye was a private secretary of Prime Minister Gordon Brown and the pair are known to be good friends. Defenders of the appointment pointed out that Davies had been selected by a panel independent of Government. It has been suggested that the behaviour of Davies and Greg Dyke during the David Kelly affair was in part due to a wish to demonstrate their independence of government. After his resignation, he became somewhat of a critic of the then Labour government.

== Later career ==
In 2005, he set up a $1.35 Billion hedge fund to invest in macroeconomic situations. He also wrote a weekly column on mathematics and statistics, Gavyn Davies does the maths, for The Guardian. Since August 2010 he has written a blog on macroeconomics for Financial Times.

He is a founding partner of Active Private Equity, Anthos Capital, and Prisma Capital Partners, as well as Chairman of Fulcrum Asset Management.

== Personal life ==
Davies and his wife live in Wandsworth, having moved there to give their daughter the opportunity to attend a better school. They also have two sons and a further home in Croyde, Devon.

Davies is a fan of Southampton FC and was part of a consortium alongside Sir David Frost to take over the club in 1996

Media offices
Preceded by Baroness Young	Vice Chairman of the BBC Board of Governors; 2001-2002	Succeeded by The Lord Ryder of Wensum
Preceded by Christopher Bland	Chairman of the BBC Board of Governors; 2001-2004	Succeeded by The Lord Ryder of Wensum (Acting)
