= Street Pastors =

Interdenominational network of Christian charities

- Formation: 2003
- Type: Charitable network
- Headquarters: London
- Region served: United Kingdom, other countries following
- CEO: Bejoy Pal
- Parent organization: Ascension Trust
- Website: streetpastors.co.uk

Street Pastors is an interdenominational network of Christian charities that operates worldwide, composed of members who spend time in their communities in order to assist people who they feel are in need of help, and to spread their religion through their service.

Street Pastors is an initiative of the Ascension Trust. Individual street pastors are Christians who walk around the streets of their towns and cities attempting to help and care for people in what they feel are practical ways. The initiative began in the United Kingdom.

Street pastors wear a blue uniform, with the term 'Street Pastor' visible in white. Street pastors are not police, ambulance or official emergency services in any way. They do not have any powers of law enforcement, arrest or to compel any member of the public to follow any requests given.

== History ==
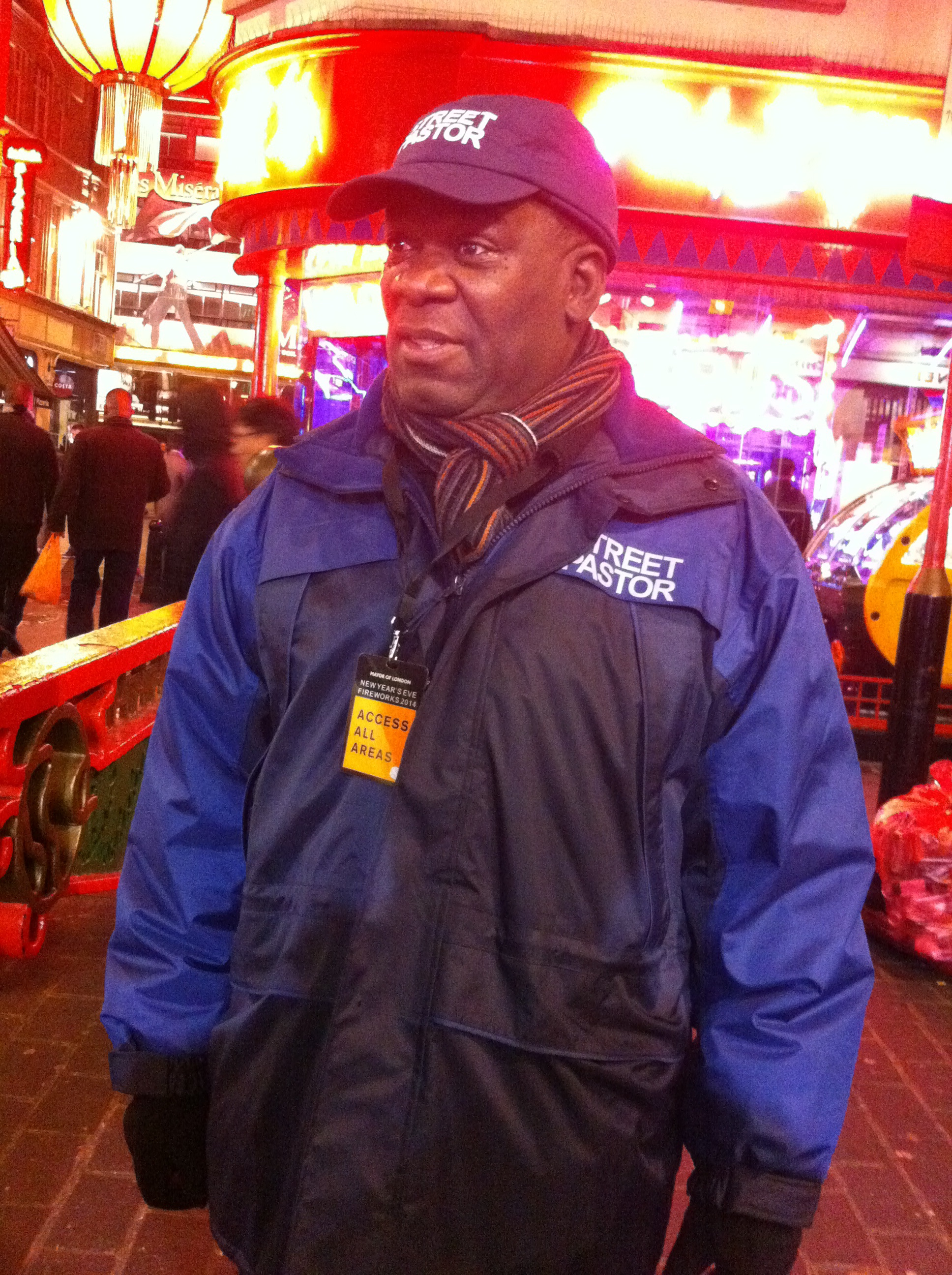
Les Isaac on Street Pastor patrol in Chinatown, London, 31 Dec 2014

Street Pastors was founded in Brixton, South London, UK in January 2003 by Rev. Les Isaac, together with David Shosanya and Ian Crichlow. It was based on a model from Jamaica in which individual churches joined together to take their values out onto the streets. Street Pastors is an initiative of the Ascension Trust, a registered charity established in 1993. The initial activities of street pastors in areas such as Lewisham and Hackney focussed mainly on confronting gang culture and the use of knives and guns. As Street Pastors started to operate in other parts of the UK, the initiative responded to other local issues, including anti-social behavior and drunkenness.

By 2008 there were Street Pastors groups in 70 locations, with another 50 being established. In 2012, Isaac was appointed an Officer of the Order of the British Empire (OBE) in the Queen's Birthday Honours for his contribution to community cohesion through the work of Street Pastors. Around 2022, Isaac stepped down as head of Ascension Trust to serve as its President, with Bejoy Pal succeeding him as CEO of the organisation. As of 2023, Street Pastors operated in approximately 250 towns and cities across the United Kingdom, with around 8,000 active volunteers conducting patrols every Friday and Saturday night.

In 2010 Ascension Trust devolved responsibility to oversee Street Pastors in Scotland to Ascension Trust (Scotland), a Scottish registered charity which has an office in Perth, and whose first chairman is former police officer Sandy Scrimgeour. In 2015 he became CEO and was succeeded in the chair by Shaw Anderson.

In 2010 Michael Frost and others established the first Australian group in Manly, New South Wales.

In 2013 several churches in Chico, CA established the first United States Street Pastors group in Chico, CA.

=== School pastors ===
In February 2011 a sister organisation, School Pastors was launched nationally after several trial projects. School Pastors aim to reduce bullying, anti-social behaviour and drug use, and to remove barriers to learning. They mentor young people within a school setting, and walk around outside to break patterns of negative behaviour at the end of the school day.

=== Rail pastors ===
Similarly, Rail Pastors commenced in 2014. Volunteers receive training from The Samaritans and British Transport Police, and aim to prevent suicide attempts and fatalities on the railway.

== Training and support for volunteers ==
Individual street pastors are Christians, over the age of 18, committed to a local church for at least one year, who pass an enhanced CRB check and who have a positive reference from their church leader stating that they would be suitable to be a Street Pastor and are leading a Christian lifestyle. They must complete 12 training sessions spread over a year, covering subjects including conflict management, counselling and basic first-aid.

Street Pastors is also supported by 'Prayer Pastors', who do not go out in public but who provide support to street pastors by praying for them and sometimes keep in touch with them by mobile phone.

== Services provided ==
Individual street pastors walk around their local community and provide information on local agencies when requested. Practical help provided by street pastors include handing out space blankets outside nightclubs, flip-flops to clubbers unable to walk home in their high-heeled footwear, giving out food & water, carrying bus timetables and cleaning streets.

== Responses to Street Pastors ==
Ascension Trust did not initially seek official funding or support, in light of some communities' distrust of local police, but did expect that they would gain recognition from emergency service officials as long as they continued to exist on the streets.

== Controversies ==
On 19 September 2022, a Street Pastor assaulted a protester standing against Mohammed Bin Salman of Saudi Arabia. The protester was holding a "Not My King" sign at one of the locations where the State Funeral of Elizabeth II was being publicly broadcast.
