= Audience Council Wales =

Organization to represent BBC audiences in Wales

The Audience Council Wales was created upon establishment of the BBC Trust in January 2007. It replaced the Broadcasting Council for Wales which had many responsibilities the present council now has, and was set up in 1953 as a result of a White Paper on broadcasting published by the Conservative government of the time. ACW was created in order to represent the interests of BBC audiences in Wales, and in helping the BBC Trust understand the needs, interests and concerns of audiences. There are other councils for the other three nations in England, Scotland and Northern Ireland. It has 11 members from across the principality.

== Role and remit ==
The Audience Council Wales scrutinises the BBC's services on behalf of BBC audiences in Wales and on behalf of BBC audiences across the UK alongside the other Councils in Scotland, Northern Ireland and England. The role and responsibilities of the Audience Councils are set out in the BBC Charter.

=== Key areas of responsibility ===
The Audience Council Wales' responsibilities are defined as:

- To scrutinise the BBC's performance on behalf of audiences living in Wales, and to advise the Trust on issues relating to BBC audiences and services at a Wales level.
- To undertake a continuing assessment of BBC programmes and services in Wales and the extent to which the BBC's network output and other activities reflect the diversity of the UK and its nations, regions and communities. Such work will include the identification of audience priorities for BBC (based on feedback and research in Wales) and the assessment of the BBC's performance.

The Audience Council's programme of work will be aligned to the Trust's business cycle, but flexible enough to respond to the needs and concerns of audiences in Wales.

=== Membership of the Audience Council Wales ===
The Chair of the Audience Council is the BBC's National Trustee for Wales, Elan Closs Stephens, who also sits on the BBC Trust. As well as the chair there are twelve other members of Council, appointed on the recommendation of the Trust's Selection Panel for Wales. They will be appointed for initial terms of up to three years, with the option of an extension of tenure for up to a further 2 years. Employees of the BBC are not eligible for appointment.

=== Meetings of the Audience Council ===
The council holds at least eight meetings every year, usually in Cardiff, but also, on occasion, in other parts of Wales. Meetings discuss Council's input on behalf of audiences in Wales to the BBC Trust's accountability activities; and presentations on strategic plans for BBC services or genres by members of BBC Wales Board of Management and/or the BBC Management centrally are frequently given.

== Current ACW members ==
- Elan Closs Stephens Chair and National Trustee for Wales
- Carol Adams
- Joni Ayn Alexander
- Rhian Connick
- Ryan Davies
- Pamela Hunt
- Pamela Hunt
- Aled Jones-Griffith
- Ian Stevens
- Ceri Stradling
- Alun Williams
- Marjorie Williams
