= Dermot Gleeson (BBC) =

Dermot James Gleeson (born 5 September 1949) is the great nephew of Michael Gleeson, the founder of MJ Gleeson Group plc. He was appointed to the board in 1975, became chief executive in 1988 and executive chairman in 1994.

Gleeson graduated from Fitzwilliam College, Cambridge, worked in the Conservative Party Research Office and served in Sir Christopher Tugendhat's cabinet in the European Commission from 1977 to 1979.

He is a former member of the Board of Governors of the BBC, where he served two terms, and subsequently one of the original members of the BBC Trust. His term at the BBC finished on 31 October 2008. Dermot Gleeson also served on the board of the Housing Corporation and the CITB; was chairman of the Major Contractors Group; and a trustee of the Institute of Cancer Research.
