= John Rose (businessman) =

British businessman (born 1952)

Sir John Rose FIMechE FRAeS HonFREng

Chief Executive, Rolls-Royce
- In office 1996–2011

Personal details
- Born: John Edward Victor Rose; 9 October 1952 (age 73) Blantyre, Malawi

Sir John Edward Victor Rose (born 9 October 1952) is a British businessman who was the Chief Executive of Rolls-Royce from 1996 to 2011, when he became deputy chairman of Rothschild Group.

== Background and education ==
Born in Blantyre, Malawi, Rose was educated at Culford School and Charterhouse. He earned his MA degree in psychology from the University of St. Andrews in Scotland in 1975. Before joining Rolls-Royce, he had a career in banking with the First National Bank of Chicago and Security Pacific.

== Career with Rolls-Royce ==
Rose joined the company in 1984 and held a number of roles. He served as Director of Corporate Development from 1989 to 1994, and in February 1993 assumed the role of President and Chief Executive of Rolls-Royce Inc, responsible for Rolls-Royce activities in North America. On 1 January 1995 he became Managing Director of the Aerospace Group until he finally became the Chief Executive of the company on 1 May 1996 after serving on its Board of directors for four years. On 30 September 2010 he announced his decision to retire from Rolls-Royce and left his post at the end of March 2011 with John Rishton taking over as Chief Executive.

== Later career ==
In September 2011 Rose became deputy chairman of the Rothschild group, and in February 2012 become a non-executive director, and subsequently chairman, of Holdingham Group, the strategic intelligence company renamed Hakluyt & Company. He is involved with a number of environmental technology companies.

== Honours ==
Rose received a knighthood in the 2003 New Year Honours. In 2008 he was made a Commandeur de la Légion d'honneur, and was also awarded the Singapore Public Service Star.

Sir John Rose is a Fellow of the Institution of Mechanical Engineers, a Fellow of the Royal Aeronautical Society, a Past-President of the European Association of Aerospace Industries (AECMA), a Past-President of the Society of British Aerospace Companies and was, until recently, on the Council of The Prince's Trust as Chairman of The Prince’s Trust. He is also a member of the JP Morgan International Council, the CBI International Advisory Board, the Advisory Board of the Economic Development Board of Singapore, The Englefield Advisory Board, and the European Round Table of Industrialists.

In 2009 Rose was elected an Honorary Fellow of the Royal Academy of Engineering and on 13 July 2010 he received an honorary degree from the University of Exeter in engineering.

Business positions
Preceded by	CEO of Rolls-Royce Holdings; 1996 – 2011	Succeeded by John Rishton
