= Board of Governors of the BBC =

Governing body of the BBC (1927–2007)

The Board of Governors of the BBC was the governing body of the British Broadcasting Corporation (BBC). At the outset, there were five Governors, later twelve. Together they regulated the BBC and represented the interests of the listeners and viewers. It existed from 1927 (when the BBC was broadcasting only by radio) until it was replaced by the BBC Trust on 1 January 2007.

The governors were independent of the Director-General and the rest of the BBC's executive team. Their role included appointing the Director-General, and in the early years other key BBC employees. They approved strategy and policy, set objectives, oversaw complaints, and produced Annual Reports which each year documented the BBC's performance and compliance with its aims.

The Governors had no direct say in programme-making, but they were nevertheless accountable to Parliament and to licence fee payers for the BBC's actions. Although a 'state broadcaster', the BBC was theoretically protected from government interference due to the statutory independence of its governing body.

The role of chairman of the Board of Governors, though a non-executive post, was one of the most important positions in British media.

== Appointments ==
In the last week of October 1926, the BBC announced the five members of its new Board of Governors, namely George Villiers, 6th Earl of Clarendon, Jack Pease, 1st Baron Gainford, Mrs Philip Snowden, Dr Montague Rendall, and Sir Gordon Nairne. It was later reported that Clarendon was a Conservative, Gainford a Liberal, and Snowden a Labour supporter, while "Sir Gordon Nairne and Dr. Montague Rendall take no interest in any particular Party."

Governors were usually appointed from senior positions in various parts of British society. Appointments were part-time positions and lasted for five (later four) years. After the Second World War, four governors were each given specific responsibilities: for Scotland, Wales, Northern Ireland, and the English regions.

Governors were nominally appointed by the monarch on the advice of ministers. In practice, they were chosen by the government of the day. This has often led to claims of political interference.

== Controversy ==
It has also been suggested that Harold Wilson's appointment of the former Tory minister Lord Hill of Luton as chairman of the Board of Governors in 1967 was motivated by a desire to undermine the radical, questioning agenda of Director-General Sir Hugh Greene. Ironically, Wilson had attacked the appointment of Hill as Chairman of the Independent Television Authority by a Conservative government in 1963.

Margaret Thatcher's government appointed a succession of governors with the apparent intent of bringing the BBC "into line" with government policy. Marmaduke Hussey was appointed chairman of the Board of Governors apparently with the specific agenda of bringing down the then-Director-General, Alasdair Milne; this government also broke the tradition of always having a trade union leader on the Board of Governors.

A later Director-General, Mark Thompson, said that staff were "quite mystified" by the rise of Margaret Thatcher and that the BBC had a left-wing bias at the time.

In January 2004, Gavyn Davies, who had been appointed chairman of the Board of Governors by the Labour government in 2001, resigned in the wake of the Hutton Inquiry. Lord Ryder of Wensum, previously a Conservative Member of Parliament and a member of Margaret Thatcher's personal staff, replaced him as Acting Chairman. It has been claimed that Ryder and other Conservatives on the Board of Governors were effectively responsible for "forcing out" Director-General Greg Dyke, who had not initially believed that his offer of resignation would be accepted by the Governors.

In May 2004, Michael Grade took over as permanent chairman. He was to be the last permanent chairman of the Board of Governors.

== Chairmen ==
- Lord Gainford (chairman of the British Broadcasting Company, before incorporation) (1922)
- Earl of Clarendon (first chairman of the British Broadcasting Corporation) (1927)
- John Henry Whitley (1930)
- Viscount Bridgeman (1935)
- Ronald Collet Norman (1935)
- Allan Powell (1940)
- Lord Inman (1947)
- Lord Simon of Wythenshawe (1947)
- Sir Alexander Cadogan (1952)
- Sir Arthur fforde (1957)
- Sir James Fitzjames Duff (1964)
- Lord Normanbrook (1964)
- Lord Hill of Luton (1967)
- Sir Michael Swann (1973)
- Sir George Howard, latterly Lord Howard of Henderskelfe (1980)
- Stuart Young (1983)
- Sir Marmaduke Hussey, latterly Lord Hussey of North Bradley (1986)
- Sir Christopher Bland (1996)
- Gavyn Davies (October 2001 – 28 January 2004)
- Lord Ryder of Wensum (acting chairman) (28 January 2004 – 17 May 2004)
- Michael Grade (17 May 2004 – 28 November 2006)

=== Final ===
The governors as of the board's dissolution on 31 December 2006 were:

- Anthony Salz (Acting Chairman)
- Ranjit Sondhi (Governor for the English regions)
- Fabian Monds (National Governor for Northern Ireland)
- Merfyn Jones (National Governor for Wales)
- Jeremy Peat (National Governor for Scotland)
- Deborah Bull
- Andrew Burns
- Dermot Gleeson
- Angela Sarkis
- Richard Tait
