= Ashley Highfield =

British broadcasting executive

Ashley Highfield is founder of Henley Partners limited, his vehicle for investing in and advising businesses across a range of sectors, including Frost Property Trust.

He is best known as being responsible for the creation, development, and launch of the BBC iPlayer.

He was Chairman/CEO of Oyster Yachts Limited between May 2018 and September 2025, makers of luxury British sailing boats. Between 2011 and 2018 he was CEO of Johnston Press Plc, owners of The Scotsman, The Yorkshire Post, and (from April 2016) the i newspaper. He has also worked for Microsoft as MD, UK (Consumer & Online), and the BBC as the main board director responsible for New Media and Technology between 2000 and 2008.

In June 2015 Culture Secretary John Whittingdale named Highfield as one of eight people on an advisory board tasked with working on the renewal of the BBC's royal charter - which sets out the corporation's remit. In October 2015 he was appointed Chairman of the News Media Association, the trade body for the UK's newspaper industry. He has held a number of non-executive roles, most recently on the boards of William Hill plc (for 9 years between 2009 and 2018) and the British Film Institute (for 7 years between 2010 and 2017).

== Career ==
Educated at Elizabeth College, Guernsey, and City University, London, Highfield joined Coopers & Lybrand, (now PwC) on graduation, working as a management consultant in the TMT sector for six years. After a secondment to Johannesburg, he returned in 1994 to the UK to become head of IT and New Media for NBC Europe, before joining Flextech - a pay-TV channel provider - where he worked for five years as director of interactive services.

In October 2000 he joined the BBC as Director of New Media & Technology working for Greg Dyke who said in his autobiography Inside Story "Ashley is one of the most inventive people I know". Dyke also said "Ashley didn't have an easy task bringing all the BBC's online activity under one division, but he did it with great success".

In 2005, under new Director General Mark Thompson, Highfield retained his place on the new slimmed-down Executive Board and was given additional responsibility for Broadcast and Production technology across the BBC. In July 2006 the BBC reformed its structure, turning the New Media department into the Future Media & Technology department (including BBC's Information & Archives business) with Highfield at its head. During his tenure, Highfield oversaw a growth in the BBC's online presence from 3.5 million to 17 million users, and was responsible for the development and launch of BBC iPlayer.

In 2008 he commissioned the Digital Media Initiative, a tapeless production system. The project was axed in 2013 (some five years after Highfield left) at a cost of £100m after failing to deliver.

At the time of his appointment to the BBC he was the youngest ever member of the organisation's Executive Board. His department was responsible for the BBC's internet presence - bbc.co.uk, interactive TV - BBC Red Button, mobile services, the BBC's technology portfolio and the BBC's Archive. At the BBC, Highfield claimed £47,000 in expenses between 2004 and 2009, while on a salary of £466,000; this included a subscription to Sky and two iPods.

It was announced on 14 April 2008 that Highfield had been appointed the CEO of Project Kangaroo. Kangaroo was a joint venture between BBC, ITV & Channel 4 offering an internet-based one stop shop for all TV programmes on-demand, which was halted by the Competition Commission. He left the project in November 2008, to work for Microsoft. He was UK Managing Director of Microsoft (Consumer & Online), responsible for Windows Mobile, MSN, Hotmail, Windows Live/Instant Messenger and Bing.

Highfield was appointed CEO of Johnston Press in 2011. In his first full year, Highfield earned a £400,000 salary, with bonuses and pension contributions of £301,000.

In his first year the company reduced its workforce by almost a quarter as Highfield dealt with a legacy of massive debt. In May 2014 JP secured a significant refinancing deal to help put the company on a secure financial footing.

During this time in news publishing, Highfield launched the highly successful pan-industry digital advertising platform, 1XL, in collaboration with Scott Gill of Mediaforce. In 2016 he bought the i newspaper from Evgeny Lebvedev for £22m, and set about launching a website and revamped Saturday edition. The i newspaper was subsequently sold in 2019 to DMGT (owner of the Daily Mail) for £50m In 2019 he received Google backing to develop a digital self-serve advertising solution aimed at SMEs called LocalEyes.

In 2018 he joined Oyster Yachts where he was Chairman/CEO until September 2025. He oversaw the record growth in sales and a return to profitability.

In 2019 he joined the Eden Project as a non-executive director, ultimately being asked to be Chairman of Eden Project Limited in 2023.

== Profile ==
He lives in the Chiltern Hills near Henley-on-Thames with his wife, and two children.

He has held many non-executive roles, including on the boards of William Hill and the British Film Institute.

== Awards ==
In 2003 Highfield was awarded the Digital Innovator internet award by The Sunday Times who dubbed his vision of a 100% digital Britain a "tour de force". In 2004 he was named 'most influential individual in technology' by online technology news site Silicon.Com for overseeing a number of 'firsts' for a major broadcaster, including the use of peer-to-peer, interactive TV, and multi-casting of TV. In 2007, The Guardian placed Highfield at #31 in its annual survey of the most powerful people in the UK media industry.

In 2004, he was made a Fellow of the Royal Society of Arts and, in 2007, a Fellow of the Royal Television Society.
