= Michael Grade =

English television executive and businessman (born 1943)

The Right Honourable The Lord Grade of Yarmouth CBE
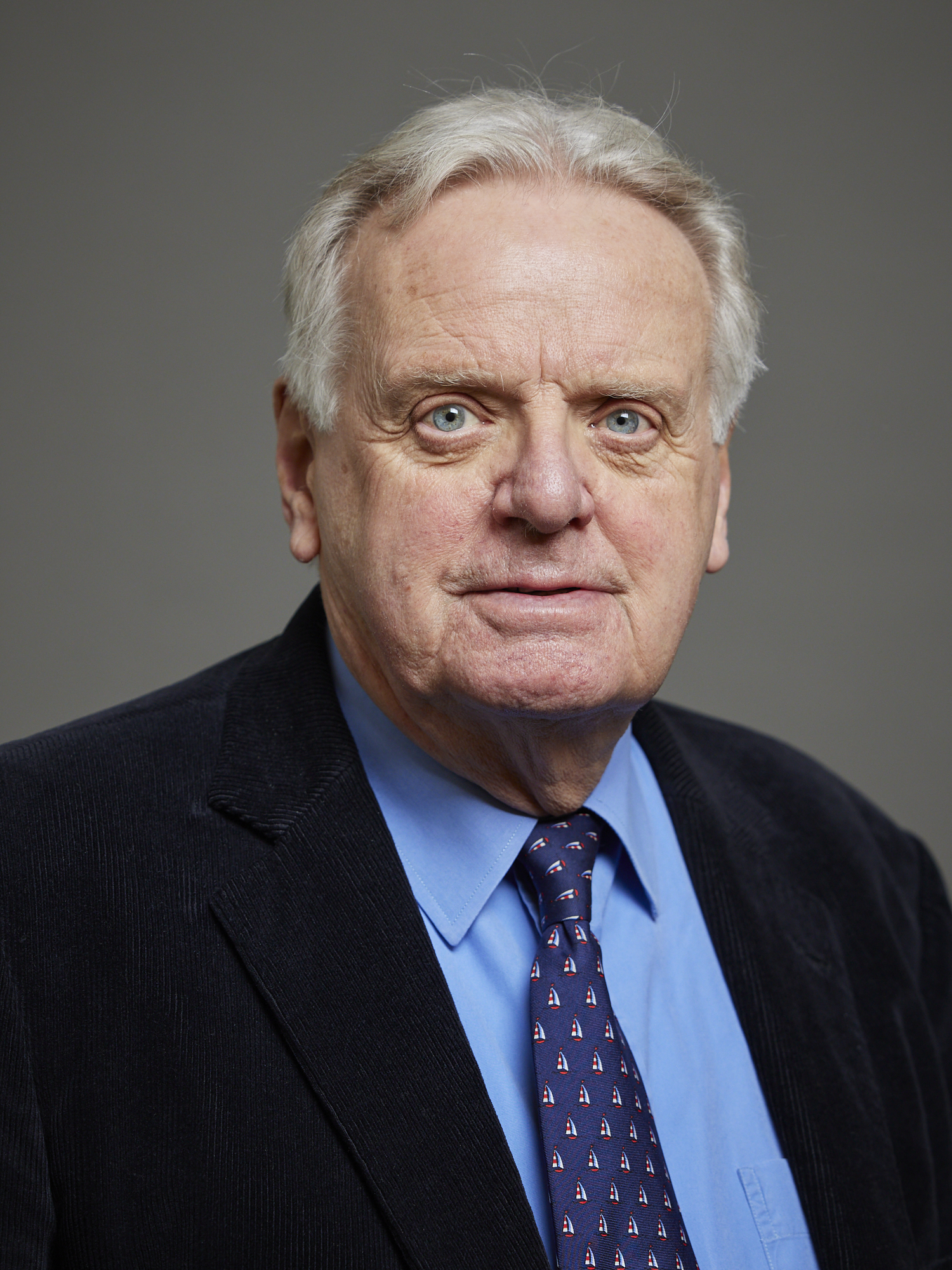
- Official portrait, 2023

Chairman of Ofcom
- In office 1 May 2022 – 30 April 2026
- Preceded by: Maggie Carver (acting)
- Succeeded by: Ian Cheshire

Chairman of the Board of Governors of the BBC
- In office 17 May 2004 – 28 November 2006
- Preceded by: The Lord Ryder of Wensum (acting)
- Succeeded by: Anthony Salz (acting)

Member of the House of Lords
- Lord Temporal
- Life peerage 25 January 2011

Personal details
- Born: Michael Ian Grade; 8 March 1943 (age 83) London, England
- Party: Conservative
- Spouses: Penelope Levinson (m. 1967; div. 1981); Sarah Lawson (m. 1982; div. 1991); Francesca Leahy (m. 1998)
- Children: 3
- Parent: Leslie Grade (father)
- Relatives: Lew Grade (uncle); Bernard Delfont (uncle)
- Education: Stowe School; St Dunstan's College
- Occupation: Television executive; businessman

Michael Ian Grade, Baron Grade of Yarmouth (born 8 March 1943) is an English television executive and businessman. He has held a number of senior roles in television, including controller of BBC1 (1984–1986), chief executive of Channel 4 (1988–1997), chairman of the board of governors of the BBC (2004–2006), and executive chairman of ITV plc (2007–2009). He sat as a Conservative Party life peer in the House of Lords from 2011 until after his appointment as chair of Ofcom, beginning in May 2022, and became a non-affiliated peer.

== Early life ==
Michael Ian Grade was born on 8 March 1943 in London, into a Jewish show business family originally called Winogradsky. His father was the theatrical agent Leslie Grade, and his uncles were the impresarios Lew Grade and Bernard Delfont. His family emigrated from Tokmak in present-day Ukraine in the 1910s. When he was three years old, his non-Jewish mother (Lynn Smith) left the family to conduct a relationship with wrestling commentator Kent Walton. Grade was brought up by his paternal grandmother, and he only saw his mother once more as an adult. He was educated at Stowe School in Buckinghamshire and St Dunstan's College in London.

== Career ==
Grade joined the Daily Mirror in 1960, and was a sports columnist from 1964 to 1966. By his own account (as related on Channel 4 chat show The Late Clive James), the job had been organised by his father. When Leslie Grade suffered a serious stroke in 1966, the 23-year-old Michael moved into his theatrical business. In 1969, he moved to London Management & Representation. Among the artists whom Grade represented were Morecambe and Wise (he successfully negotiated the duo's defection from ATV to BBC2 in 1968) and Larry Grayson.

=== LWT ===
Grade entered the television industry in 1973 when he joined London Weekend Television (LWT) as deputy controller of programmes (entertainment). During this time he bought the scripts of an African-American sitcom Good Times which had an all-black cast. Adapted as The Fosters (1976–1977), it became the first British sitcom to have an entirely black cast. At LWT, Grade worked with both John Birt and Greg Dyke.

After he became director of programmes in 1977, Grade commissioned the series Mind Your Language, but later cancelled it. At an event at the Edinburgh Television Festival in 1985, he agreed that the series was racist, and said that "it was really irresponsible of us to put it out". In what was termed 'Snatch of the Day' by the press in 1978, Grade attempted the acquisition of exclusive screening rights to Football League matches. Previously the BBC had held the more desirable rights, but the Office of Fair Trading intervened, and Grade's purchase was revoked. The package of recorded highlights on Saturday evenings now alternates each season between ITV and the BBC.

Also in 1978, Grade managed to place under contract the entertainer Bruce Forsyth who had helped the BBC to dominate the Saturday evening television ratings through the decade via The Generation Game series. His new vehicle was titled Bruce Forsyth's Big Night and was intended to feature all his talents in one programme lasting two hours. The budget was £2million for a fourteen-week run. The new series was considered a disaster, with the press turning against the host, but did achieve an initial audience of 14 million. The Generation Game, with new host Larry Grayson, managed to achieve a larger audience. LWT's Big Night was not recommissioned.

Grade announced at a press conference in May 1979 that LWT had secured a contract with a production company formed by television dramatist Dennis Potter and his producer Kenith Trodd. The corporate association proved short-lived, with both sides having insufficient experience for budgeting drama shot on film, and was terminated by Grade in the summer of 1980. Only three of what had been projected as six filmed plays by Potter were shot and screened. Grade though, was directly involved with some of the playwright's later commissions.

Grade approved production of The Professionals and initiated the long-running arts' programme The South Bank Show.

In 1981, Grade left LWT to begin a two-year period as the president of Embassy Television in the United States. In The Times he was quoted as stating, "It is a once-in-a-lifetime opportunity; it is, if you like, a gamble I want to take". His pay rose from £32,000 to $250,000 per annum. During this time he was largely involved in developing and selling sitcoms in this period: "When you read 30 or 40 comedy scripts a week, you get a bit barking." Grade also produced a series for the only time in his career, a nine-part adaptation of Kane and Abel, the novel by Jeffrey Archer. In a Jewish Chronicle interview with Michael Freedland in 2011, Grade said he had "missed public service broadcasting, real drama, news, current affairs".

=== BBC ===
In early summer 1984, Bill Cotton recruited Grade for BBC Television, where he became controller of BBC 1 on 1 September 1984, taking, as he told Michael Freedland, "the biggest pay cut in history"; his salary went down from $500,000, excluding large bonuses, to £37,000 a year. Later he became director of programmes in 1986, and managing director designate in 1987, before leaving the BBC at the end of 1987. His three-year tenure as a BBC controller was controversial.

Grade cancelled the rights to screen Dallas while fighting Thames Television for the rights to the series (although this decision was subsequently reversed). He cut short the expensive serialisation of The Tripods trilogy, written by John Christopher, because he was dissatisfied with the ratings it had achieved after two series. He also considered cancelling the sitcom Blackadder, judging the first series to be unfunny and costly.

Grade agreed to commission Dennis Potter's serial The Singing Detective (1986) after a brief meeting with Jonathan Powell, then the BBC's head of drama. It was a highlight of this period, but came under criticism from Mary Whitehouse and the tabloid press for its content. Referring to the depiction of an illicit sexual encounter in episode three, Grade said: "There are very few people in television drama that you are prepared to trust with scenes like this. But Dennis Potter is one of them".

During his time as controller, Grade was also responsible for purchasing the Australian soap opera Neighbours for BBC1's new daytime schedule; it debuted on British television on 27 October 1986. He was also responsible for repeating Neighbours, at first exclusively an afternoon programme, in a later timeslot (on the advice of his daughter, Alison, who was annoyed that she could not watch it because she was at school). This proved to be a successful scheduling decision, with audiences in excess of 18 million for the new 5.35 pm broadcasts. Other successes during Grade's tenure included the debut of soap operas EastEnders and Howards' Way in 1985 and the hospital drama Casualty in 1986. He was also praised by Bob Geldof for agreeing to broadcast the charity rock concert Live Aid for 24 hours.

In November 1984 he decided to end screening beauty pageants, stating, "I believe these contests no longer merit national air time. They are an anachronism in this day and age of equality and verging on the offensive."

==== Doctor Who controversy ====
Grade announced on 27 February 1985 that season 23 of Doctor Who, which was scheduled to be transmitted from January to March 1986, would be postponed as he had decided that the programme's budget would be better spent on other drama productions. What became an 18-month hiatus for Doctor Who (the series did not resume transmission until September 1986) prompted a strong reaction from viewers. Grade was also noted for his strong dislike of the series, such as in an interview in 2004, where he said: "I thought it was horrible, awful. I thought it was so outdated. It was just a little show for a few pointy head Doctor Who fans. It was also very violent and it had lost its magic". In an appearance on the BBC's Room 101 in 2002, Grade chose the series as one of his hates, criticised its production values and said that he had little interest in, or sympathy for, science fiction.

Eric Saward, the script editor of Doctor Who at the time of its suspension, responded to Grade's criticism a few years later. In his view, Grade's comments were unfair because he was in the position to allocate more resources to the programme and thus improve its quality. Actress Katy Manning, who had portrayed a companion of Jon Pertwee's Doctor, praised Grade's treatment of the series on the DVD commentary for The Mind of Evil (1971). In her view, Grade "was actually doing the right thing", and she credited the long break prior to 2005 with rejuvenating the series.

The decision in the autumn of 1986 that season 24 of Doctor Who could only happen on the condition that Colin Baker was removed from the title role has been attributed to Grade, with him reportedly describing Baker's portrayal as "absolutely God-awful". It has also been suggested that Grade was influenced by a romantic relationship with Baker's ex-wife, Liza Goddard. In 2022, Grade denied both that the decision to fire Baker was his and any personal relationship with Goddard. Baker's immediate predecessor in the role, Peter Davison, argued in 2018 that the decision to dismiss the actor was more to do with the executives wanting to get rid of the series' producer, John Nathan-Turner, saying: "I was upset about what happened, really – because, first of all, it wasn't to do with Colin, I know that. It was to do with other issues. The power structure in the BBC had changed and they didn't want John Nathan-Turner around is the truth of it."

Following the end of the first series of the revived Doctor Who in 2005, Grade wrote a letter to Mark Thompson, the Director-General of the BBC, congratulating all involved in the production on its success, signing-off with "PS never dreamed I would ever write this. Must be going soft!" In an interview for Radio Times in 2012, Grade commented: "From clunky Daleks that couldn't go up and down stairs to the filmic qualities today of Doctor Who, it's a transformation... The show still leaves me cold, but I admire it, which I never did before."

=== Channel 4 ===
Grade left the BBC in 1987 after an unsuccessful application to succeed Alasdair Milne as director-general and a conflict with the corporation's new deputy director-general, John Birt, a former friend and colleague at London Weekend Television. He accepted the post of chief executive of Channel 4, succeeding Jeremy Isaacs, and took up his position at the beginning of 1988. Isaacs criticised Grade's appointment and threatened to "throttle" Grade if the nature of the channel was altered.

Grade phased out some of Channel 4's more high-brow programming, for which he was accused of "dumbing down". His 1991 decision to axe the long-running and widely admired discussion series After Dark is detailed here. Grade stated that in the same week that he moved to Channel 4, it had shown a repeat of the 1984 adaptation of The Far Pavilions, featuring American actress Amy Irving "blacked up" as an Indian princess. During this period, he was also criticised by the conservative press: Daily Mail columnist Paul Johnson dubbed him Britain's "pornographer-in-chief".

In addition to securing talent from the BBC, Grade recognised the improving quality of US television output, making series such as Friends and ER the mainstays of the channel's schedule. In 1994, while at Channel 4, he was awarded the BAFTA fellowship in recognition of "an exceptional contribution" to television.

In 1997, Grade became involved in a dispute with Chris Morris regarding the satire Brass Eye after repeatedly intervening in the production to order edits to various episodes, and rescheduling some instalments for sensitivity. Morris responded by inserting a frame stating "Grade is a cunt" into the final episode of the first run. In the same year, Grade left Channel 4 to head First Leisure Corporation but departed two years later following a substantial internal re-structuring. His next job was as the chairman of the new Pinewood and Shepperton film studios company.

=== Return to the BBC ===
Grade was on the board of the poorly received Millennium Dome project, and has served as chairman of Octopus Publishing, the Camelot Group, and Hemscott (a position that he intends to relinquish).

Grade had ambitions to become chairman of the BBC board of governors in 2001, but was beaten to the post by Gavyn Davies. Following Davies' resignation in the aftermath of the Hutton Inquiry report, it was announced on 2 April 2004 that Grade had been appointed BBC chairman; his only demand was that he would not have to give up his job as a director of Charlton Athletic F.C. He took up his post on 17 May.

On 19 September 2006, Grade became non-executive chairman of online food delivery company Ocado. He resigned from the role on 23 January 2013, and was succeeded by Stuart Rose.

=== ITV ===
On 28 November 2006, Grade and the BBC confirmed that he was to resign from his position within the corporation to replace Sir Peter Burt as chairman, and Charles Allen as chief executive, of one of the companies forming part of its commercial rival, ITV. He became executive chairman of ITV plc on 8 January 2007.

During Grade's tenure, ITV struggled with falling advertising revenue and viewing figures. Upon appointment, Grade announced that his first priority would be to work as a senior partner at ITV Network Limited to improve ITV programming, as well as strengthen its digital channels, ITV2, ITV3, ITV4 and CITV. On 12 September 2007, Grade announced a controversial five-year re-structuring plan for ITV plc-owned regions, selecting entertainment as the top priority. A major overhaul of ITV plc's regional structure was also proposed.

The plans resulted in the consolidation of the ITV regional news programmes in England, with regions now broadcasting a single service per region rather than multiple, specialised, local services. For example, ITV Yorkshire would no longer broadcast in separate northern and southern regions. They merged ITV Border with ITV Tyne Tees, and ITV West with ITV Westcountry, effectively ending two regions' tenure as independent players within ITV. The proposals were criticised by BECTU and the National Union of Journalists. Any such changes would be subject to approval by Ofcom.

In March 2009, Grade initiated libel action against another television executive, Greg Dyke, and The Times newspaper over allegations of improper conduct made by Dyke about Grade, relating to his move from the BBC to ITV in 2006. The newspaper subsequently withdrew the allegations and published an apology, admitting that the allegations had no justification.

On 23 April 2009, Grade announced he would be stepping down as chief executive to become non-executive chairman at the conclusion of regulatory reviews into advertising contract rights and digital TV, at some point before the end of 2009.

=== Peerage ===
Grade revealed his membership of the Conservative Party for the first time in May 2010. On 25 January 2011, he was created a life peer, as Baron Grade of Yarmouth, of Yarmouth in the County of Isle of Wight. He was introduced in the House of Lords on 27 January and sat as a Conservative until moving to become non-affiliated as part of his role as chairman of Ofcom.

=== Ofcom ===
In March 2022, the Second Johnson ministry appointed Grade to a four-year term as chairman of Ofcom, effective from 1 May 2022. In June 2022, the BBC's official historian, Jean Seaton, publicly said that Grade "is too lazy, too old, and has too many conflicts of interest", and called his appointment a means of "bullying" the BBC. Noting Grade's public approval of the right-wing political activist Laurence Fox's appearance on the BBC's Question Time, journalist George Monbiot raised concerns about Ofcom's impartiality under his leadership, and following misinformation preceding the 2024 United Kingdom riots, Monbiot accused Ofcom of a failure to properly respond to rule-breaking behaviour by outlets such as GB News "while continuing to enforce [rules] against less partisan media". Grade ceased his role at Ofcom at the end of April 2026.

== Personal life ==
Grade was appointed a Commander of the Order of the British Empire in 1998. That same year, he published his autobiography, It Seemed Like a Good Idea at the Time, and married his third wife, Francesca Leahy; they have a son, Samuel.

Grade was previously married to Penelope Jane Levinson (1967–1981) (she later married writer and historian Sir Max Hastings), by whom he has two children, and Sarah Lawson (1982–1991), a film producer.

Grade is a fan of Charlton Athletic F.C.

Coat of arms of Michael Grade

Crest
Rising from the top of a lighthoyse Argent irradiated Or a martlet Azure.
Escutcheon
Per chevron grady Argent and Azure in base a lighthouse between two sails issuing in base Argent and in chief two masks that to the dexter of comedy and that to the sinister of tragedy Azure.
Supporters
Dexter a sea lion sinister a sea horse both Azure with the piscine parts Argent resting on a lightning flash Or.

Cultural offices
Preceded by Bill Cotton	President of the Royal Television Society; 1995–1997	Succeeded by Jeremy Isaacs
Media offices
Preceded by Alan Hart	Controller of BBC1; 1984–1987	Succeeded by Jonathan Powell
Preceded by Jeremy Isaacs	Chief Executive of Channel 4; 1987–1997	Succeeded by Michael Jackson
Preceded by The Lord Ryder of Wensum; Acting	Chairman of the Board of Governors of the BBC; 2004–2006	Succeeded by Anthony Salz; Acting
Preceded by Sir Peter Burt; As non-executive chairman Charles Allen; As chief executive	Executive Chairman of ITV plc 2007–2009	Succeeded by Archie Norman
Orders of precedence in the United Kingdom
Preceded by The Lord Magan of Castletown	Gentlemen; Baron Grade of Yarmouth	Followed by The Lord Stirrup
