= Educated Evans =

Educated Evans may refer to:

- Educated Evans (novel), 1924 novel by Edgar Wallace and first novel in a trilogy
- Educated Evans (film), 1936 film based on the novel
- Educated Evans (TV series), 1957–1958 TV series based on the novel
