= Fortune Theatre =

West End theatre in London

- Fortune Thriller Theatre
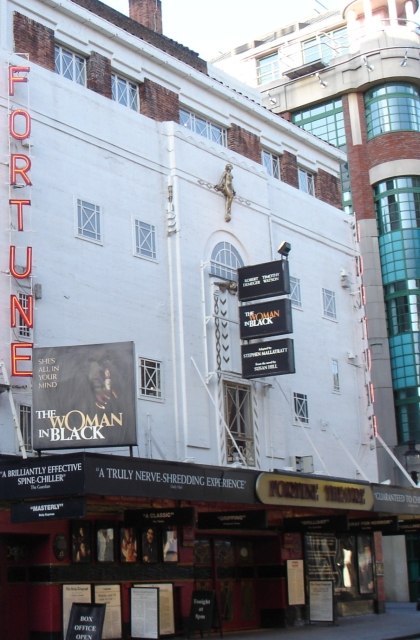
- Showing The Woman in Black, 2006
- Interactive map of Fortune Theatre
- Address: Russell Street; London, WC2; United Kingdom
- Coordinates: 51.513°N 0.121°W
- Owner: ATG Entertainment
- Capacity: 432 on 3 levels
- Type: West End theatre
- Designation: Grade II
- Production: Operation Mincemeat
- Public transit: Covent Garden

Construction
- Opened: 8 November 1924; 101 years ago
- Years active: 1924 – present
- Architect: Ernest Schaufelberg

Website
- Fortune Theatre website

The Fortune Theatre is a 432-seat West End theatre in Russell Street, near Covent Garden, in the City of Westminster. From 1989 until 2023 the theatre hosted the long running play The Woman in Black.

== History ==
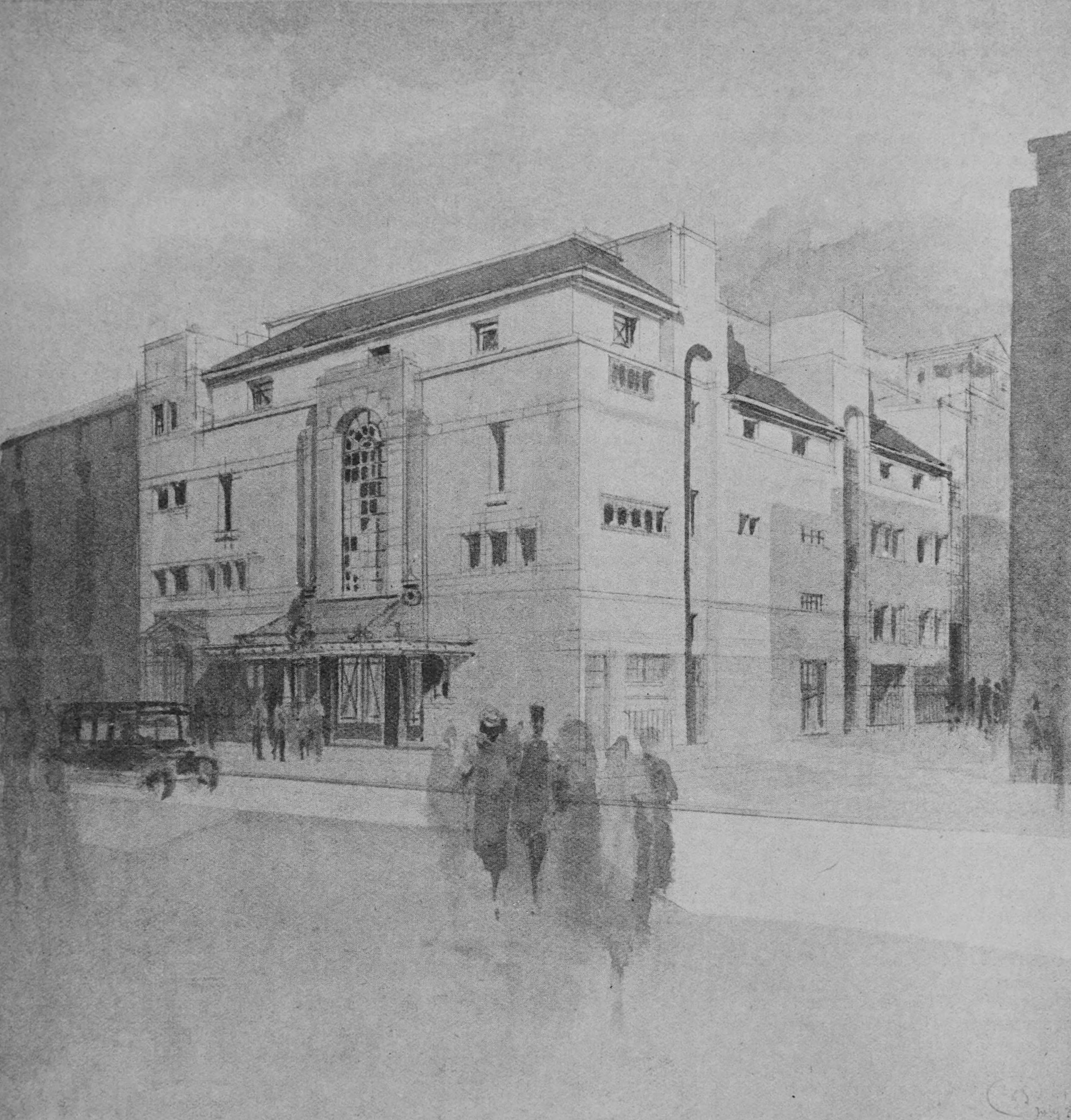
Waterlcolour perspective of the preliminary design by Schaufelberg. Details differ slightly from the building as constructed.

The site was acquired by author, playwright and impresario Laurence Cowen, and had previously been the location of the old Albion Tavern, a public house that was frequented by Georgian and Victorian actors. The theatre is situated next to Crown Court Church, and dwarfed by the Theatre Royal, Drury Lane on the opposite side of the road.

Cowen commissioned architect Ernest Schaufelberg to design the theatre in an Italianate style. Constructed from 1922 to 1924, it was the first theatre to be built in London after the end of the First World War. One of the first buildings in London to experiment with concrete, its façade is principally made of bush hammered concrete, with brick piers supporting the roof. Since the demolition of the original Wembley Stadium, the theatre is now the oldest remaining public building designed wholly using concrete as a textured and exposed façade. The theatre's famous figurine, Terpsichore (perched high above the entrance) was sculpted by M. H. Crichton of the Bromsgrove Guild, a noted company of artisans from Worcestershire. The theatre is entered through bronze double doors, and internally there is a foyer of grey and red marble, with a beaten copper ticket booth.

With 432 seats in the auditorium, it is believed to be the second smallest West End theatre. It was refurbished in 1960, and Grade II listed by English Heritage in May 1994.

== Productions ==
The theatre opened, as the Fortune Thriller Theatre, on 8 August 1924, with Sinners by Lawrence Cowen. During the Second World War, the theatre hosted performances by ENSA, entertainers drawn from the armed forces. Since the war, the theatre has been a receiving house, with actors such as Dame Judi Dench, Dirk Bogarde and Maureen Lipman appearing.

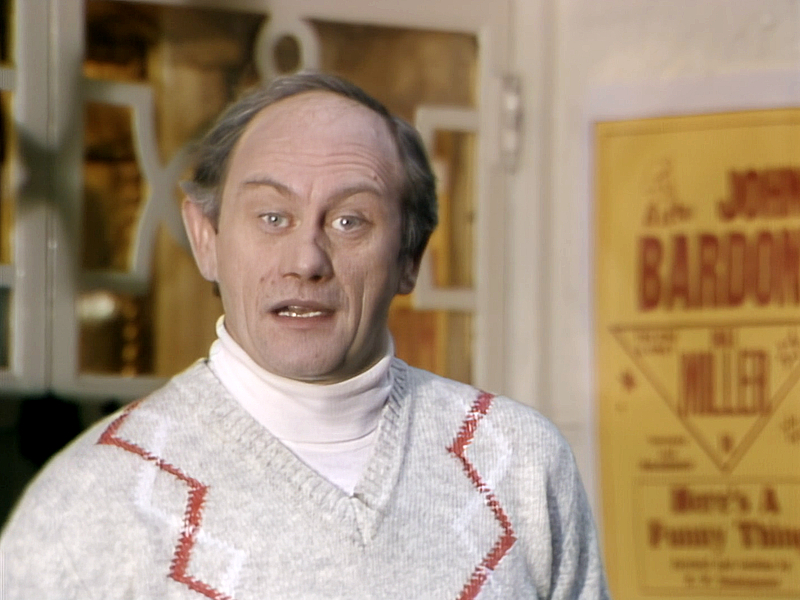
John Bardon outside the Fortune Theatre stage door in 1982, introducing Here's A Funny Thing

In 1982 the theatre was used as the recording venue for Here's A Funny Thing, actor John Bardon's one-man show on the life and career of legendary British music hall comedian Max Miller. As well as the stage and auditorium, scenes were also shot outside the theatre stage door. It was broadcast by Channel 4 in November 1982.

The Fortune also hosted shows from Flanders and Swann and Beyond the Fringe. Nunsense played at the theatre in 1987.

From 1989 until 2023 the theatre hosted the long running play The Woman in Black, which was adapted by Stephen Mallatratt from the book of the same name by Susan Hill. A celebration was held in 2001 to mark the 5,000th performance. On 9 November 2022 it was announced that the show would close at the Fortune theatre, with the final performance taking place on 4 March 2023.

From 9 to 13 September 2008, the show was performed in Japanese by Takaya Kamikaya and Haruhito Saito, in celebration of the 150th anniversary of diplomatic relations between the UK and Japan.

The theatre was also used to record the Lily Savage video "Paying the Rent" in 1993, which was later broadcast by Channel 4 in the UK in 1996.

On 29 March 2023, a new production opened at the Fortune Theatre for the first time since 1989: Operation Mincemeat.

== Other ==
On 11 December 2023, a plaque was installed at the Fortune Theatre in commemoration of Hester Leggatt; Leggatt was portrayed as a character in Operation Mincemeat, which played at the Fortune Theatre.

The Fortune Theatre is notable for having a bar in the seating area of the Stalls.
