= Renown Pictures (disambiguation) =

Renown Pictures may refer to:

- Renown Pictures (1923), an American film distributor, founded circa 1923, distributor of The Reckless Sex (1925)
- Renown Pictures (1938), a British film distributor founded by producer George Minter in 1938
- Renowned Films, a London-based production company, founded circa 2015
