= Thank Evans =

- Original Trade Ad Poster
- Directed by: Roy William Neill
- Written by: John Dighton; Edgar Wallace (novel)
- Produced by: Irving Asher
- Starring: Max Miller; Hal Walters; Albert Whelan
- Cinematography: Basil Emmott
- Distributed by: Warner Brothers-First National Productions
- Release date: June 1938
- Running time: 78 minutes
- Country: United Kingdom
- Language: English

Thank Evans is a 1938 British comedy film directed by Roy William Neill and starring Max Miller. It was written by John Dighton based on the novel by Edgar Wallace. The film is a sequel to Educated Evans (1936), with Miller, Hal Walters and Albert Whelan all returning to reprise their roles as the hapless horse racing tipster Evans, his pal Nobby and the bungling Sergeant Challoner.

== Preservation status ==
The British Film Institute has classed Thank Evans as a lost film. Its National Archive holds a collection of stills and a single 105 ft fragment of the film.

== Plot ==
Evans is once again down on his luck, and at the racecourse meeting a friendly and sympathetic Lord helps him out. Later Evans manages to repay the gentleman's kindness by exposing his horse trainer as a duplicitous con-merchant.

== Cast ==
- Max Miller as Educated Evans
- Hal Walters as Nobby
- Albert Whelan as Sgt. Challoner
- Polly Ward as Rosie
- John Carol as Harry
- Robert Rendel as Lord Claverley
- Glen Alyn as Brenda
- Freddie Watts as Mulcay
- Harvey Braban as Inspector Pine
- Aubrey Mallalieu as Magistrate

== Reception ==
The Monthly Film Bulletin wrote: "This nonsensical story is very good fun of its kind. The direction is slick and resourceful, and the pace swift. Max Miller is in his element. He puts over a rapid stream of Cockney wisecracks, amusing patter and gags. His exuberance is unfailing and infectious. The crook melodrama of the stolen watch is entertaining burlesque, and the climax unadulterated slapstick. Hal Walters as Nobby makes an effective stooge, and the supporting players are competent."

Kine Weekly wrote: "Ritous comedy of the turf, smoothly adapted from one of Edgar Wallace's famous 'Educated Evans' stories. The title-role is a made-to-measure one for Max Miller and he puts in some grand work. There is, of course, a good deal of talk and high-pressure talk at that, but the many lively Cockney cracks amplified by the star's terrific exuberance, more than amply compensates for occasional loss of physical action. The climax is excellent slapstick."

The Daily Film Renter wrote: "Latest screen adventure of celebrated Wallace character, with Max Miller in top form as fast-talking audacious turf tipster... Star's cheeky personality is capitally exploited in role that keeps him in forefront of action from start to finish, and embraces brilliantly funny police court session that received Preview applause. Authentic racecourse backgrounds supply interesting locations, and production has attractive surface polish. Excellent light popular entertainment, with strong pull for vast Miller following."

Picturegoer wrote: "I do not think that Max Miller is as well served with material in Thank Evans as he was in Educated Evans, but the picture is, nevertheless, a cheery one. ... It relies mainly on the star's ability to put over his quick-fire wisecracks, but it is also ingenious and comic in situations. Some of the jokes are rather near the knuckle, but they are broadly vulgar rather than suggestive. Max Miller holds the show together with his quick-fire patter, and he has an excellent foil in Hal Walters as Nobby, his tout."

== See also ==
- List of films about horses
- List of films about horse racing
