= 3MW =

3MW may refer to:

- 3-Minute Warning, a professional wrestling tag team
- Three-minute warning (football), a rule in Canadian football
- 3 Minute Wonder, a Channel 4 documentary slot
- Three Minute Warning, a song by Liquid Tension Experiment

== See also ==
- MW3 (disambiguation)
