= The Greenhouse Conspiracy =

1990 documentary film

The Greenhouse Conspiracy is a documentary film broadcast by Channel 4 in the United Kingdom on 12 August 1990, as part of the Equinox series, which rejected the scientific consensus on climate change and claimed that scientists critical of global warming theory were denied funding.

== Context ==
It is one of the earliest instances of the suggestion of a conspiracy to promote false claims supporting global warming. Although the title of the program implied the existence of a conspiracy, when interviewed on the program, Patrick Michaels played down the idea.
