= MW3 =

MW3 may refer to:

- Call of Duty: Modern Warfare 3, a 2011 video game
- Call of Duty: Modern Warfare III (2023 video game), a reboot of the 2011 game
- MechWarrior 3, a 1999 video game

== See also ==
- 3MW (disambiguation)
