= Max Miller (comedian) =

English music hall comedian and actor (1894–1963)

- Photo of Miller, autographed 1938
- Born: Thomas Henry Sargent; 21 November 1894; Kemptown, Brighton, England
- Died: 7 May 1963 (aged 68); Brighton, England
- Resting place: Downs Crematorium, Brighton, England
- Spouse: Kathleen Marsh (m. 1921)

Comedy career
- Genre: Blue comedy
- Website: maxmiller.org

Thomas Henry Sargent (21 November 1894 – 7 May 1963), known professionally by his stage name Max Miller and billed as The Cheeky Chappie, was an English comedian often considered the greatest stand-up of his generation. He came from humble beginnings and left school aged 12. At the outbreak of the First World War, he volunteered for the army. During his time in the forces, he started a troupe concert party. On leaving the army, he took up work as a light comedian, dancer and singer. He toured extensively, appearing in variety and revues, and by the early 1930s reached the top of the bill in the large music halls, including the London Palladium.

He recorded many songs, some of which he wrote. He appeared frequently on radio and starred in 14 feature films. He was known for flamboyant suits and his wicked charm, and his risqué jokes often led to difficulties with the censors. He made his last recording in January 1963 and died four months later.

== Early years ==
Miller was born as Thomas Henry Sargent on 21 November 1894 in Hereford Street, Kemptown, Brighton, Sussex. He was the second child of James Sargent, a labourer, and Alice (née West), a flower-seller. Miller had three brothers and two sisters. His parents were poor and often unable to pay rent, so were forced to move to other parts of the town. Owing to this, Miller frequently changed schools until he reached 12, when he left all together. He tried jobs such as labouring, delivering milk, selling fish and chips, and caddying at Brighton and Hove Golf Course, and trained to be a motor mechanic. As a youth, he was nicknamed Swanky Sargent.

On the outbreak of the war in 1914, Miller volunteered for the army. He joined the Royal Sussex Regiment. After serving in France, he was posted to India and a year later to Mesopotamia, where he was temporarily blinded for three days. This experience stayed with him all his life, and in later years he did much work to help the blind, including giving his home in Brighton over to St Dunstans during World War 2. During his time in the army, he started a troops' concert party.

== Career ==
=== Early performing experiences ===
Demobilised from the army, Miller found work to be in short supply, and he had lost his mother to the 1918 flu pandemic. He had his sights on performing in London, and obtained a booking at the Shoreditch Hall in 1919. He was not experienced enough for the type of venue, and lasted only a week. Returning to Brighton, he saw an advertisement for artists to join Jack Sheppard's concert party in an alfresco theatre on Brighton beach. He applied and joined as a light comedian for the 1919 summer season. While with the concert party, he met his future wife, Frances Kathleen Marsh, who was a contralto in the group.

Kathleen Marsh came from a middle-class family whose parents came to Brighton from Dorset shortly before she was born in 1896. Her elder brother Ernest Marsh served as a Brighton alderman for 43 years and was the mayor from 1949 to 1950.

In the summer of 1920, Harry toured nationwide in The Rogues, a concert party. In 1921, Harry and Kathleen toured in a revue called The Girl. While in Plymouth, the couple married at the parish church in Tormoham, Devon on 17 February 1921. Tormoham is today better known as Torre in the seaside resort of Torquay. As well as being a performer, Kathleen was an astute businesswoman, and did much to develop her husband's career. She suggested that he should change his name to Max Miller. Later, a press notice described Max as the Cheeky Chappie, and the nickname stuck.

Max and Kathleen formed a double act for a while, but it became obvious to her that Max was the stronger performer and that he would be better as a solo act.

=== Apprenticeship ===
In the 1920s, Miller was regularly touring in revues. In 1922, he was in a show presented by the Sydney Syndicate, There You Are Then. In 1923, he toured with the Ernest Binn Arcadians. 1924 saw him joining a revue called Crisps. That summer, he returned to Jack Sheppard's Concert Party on the Brighton seafront.

In 1925, he continued in the revue Crisps, and in November joined the cast of Ten to One On, which starred Jimmy James. This show ran until February 1926, when Miller gained work in variety or cine-variety, the latter a show consisting half of film and half of live acts. In September 1926, he was booked in the Holborn Empire, his first engagement there, where he was spotted by impresario Tom Arnold, who booked him to star in his next revue, Piccadilly. It opened in Birmingham and toured the country. His co-star was the 21-year-old Florence Desmond.

After that, he was booked by Fred Karno to appear in The Show. In May 1927, he joined a touring cabaret revue called XYZ until the end of the year. After a few weeks in variety, he was back in revue, starring in Francis Laider's Tipperary Tim.

This kept him busy until February 1929, when he appointed a new agent, Julius Darewski. This was a turning point in his career. In May, Miller made his first appearance at the London Palladium in variety. He returned there in October and, in November, joined the cast of Fools in Paradise, which took him to March 1930. This would be his last revue for some time.

Miller much preferred to perform solo, and from 1930 onwards, he appeared in variety in large theatres, including the London Palladium and the Holborn Empire. In those days, instant success was unheard of, and Miller, like any other performer, had to earn his fame through a long apprenticeship. In May 1931, he appeared in his first Royal Variety Performance. Radio broadcasts followed.

In 1932, he made his first recording, Confessions of a Cheeky Chappie, on the Broadcast Twelve Records label. After this initial success, he was wooed by His Master's Voice and recorded for them. In 1953, he changed to Philips, and then to Pye.

Miller was given a cameo role in the film The Good Companions (1933) in the part of a music publisher selling a song to a pianist, played by John Gielgud. Although he was not credited for his role, his three-minute debut was impressive, got him noticed and led to his making a further 13 films working up from small parts to starring roles. Considered his best film, Educated Evans (1936), which was based on an Edgar Wallace story and filmed by Warner Bros., it is now considered a lost film, along with several other films he appeared in. His last but one film was Hoots Mon! (1940). He played the part of a southern English comedian called Harry Hawkins. In the film there is a scene in which Harry Hawkins appears on the stage in a variety theatre. The act is Miller's, and the sequence is the only one in existence giving us an idea of his stage act. It is invariably included in any documentary made about him.

=== Stardom ===
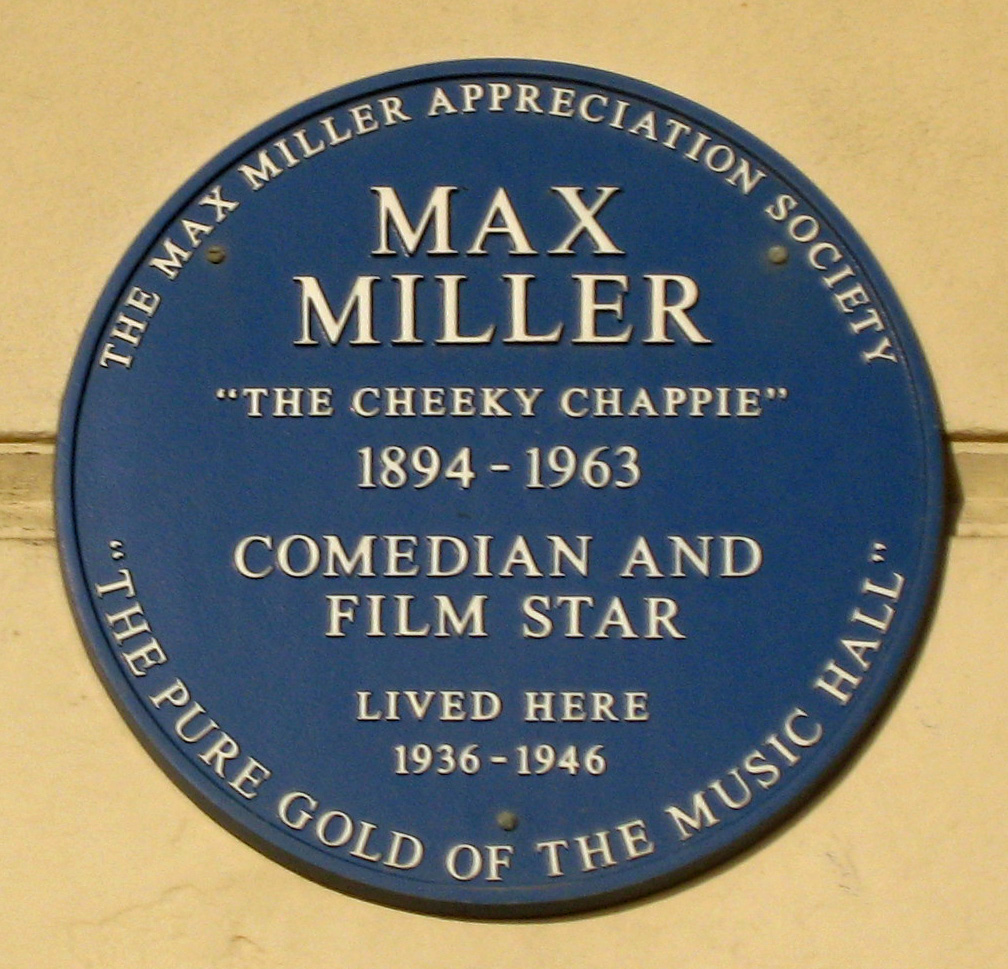
A commemorative plaque at 160 Marine Parade, Brighton

Miller's act on a variety bill usually lasted between 20 and 30 minutes. It would begin with the orchestra playing his signature tune, Mary from the Dairy. A spotlight aimed on the curtain by the wings would anticipate his appearance. There would be excitement in the audience; he would sometimes wait for up to ten seconds until he appeared, leading to resounding applause. Miller would walk to the microphone and just stand there in his costume, a colourful suit with plus-fours, a kipper tie, trilby and co-respondent shoes, and wait for the laughter to begin.

Although Miller's material was risqué, he never swore on stage and disapproved of those who did. He used double entendre, and when telling a joke would often leave out the last word or words for the audience to complete.

His act would be punctuated by songs: sentimental material like "My Old Mum", or comic numbers such as "Twin Sisters". Sometimes he would accompany himself on guitar or entertain with a soft shoe shuffle. He wrote and co-wrote a number of songs.

Miller was very much a southern English comedian. He preferred being booked in theatres in London or the south, so he could return to his beloved Brighton after a show. In 1932, he embarked on his only overseas tour, when he sailed to Cape Town to appear in Johannesburg and Pretoria, South Africa.

After many years as a solo act in variety, he appeared in George Black's wartime revue Haw Haw! at the Holborn Empire from December 1939 to July 1940. George Black's next revue, Apple Sauce, opened in August 1940 at the Holborn Empire, co-starring Vera Lynn. After the theatre was bombed, the show transferred to the London Palladium, where it ran until November 1941. After that, Miller was back touring in variety, and broke all records as the highest paid variety artist, earning £1,025 in a single week at the Coventry Hippodrome in February, 1943.

In 1947, he topped the bill in Bernard Delfont presents International Variety at the London Casino. In his review of the show, Daily Mail theatre critic Lionel Hale described Miller as the "gold of the music hall".

=== The comeback ===
Miller appeared in three Royal Variety Performances in 1931, 1937 and 1950. In the last of these, he was annoyed that he was only given six minutes, while the American comedian Jack Benny got twenty minutes, so he abandoned his script and went on for twelve minutes, ending with riotous applause. This had a devastating effect on the schedule. Val Parnell, the producer, who ran the Moss Empires circuit of theatres, was furious, and told Miller that he would never work for him again.

Despite this, after eighteen months of Miller's touring in secondary theatres, he was invited back to the "number ones" – the Moss Empires – and returned in triumph to the London Palladium. One of these "number two" theatres was Hulme Hippodrome, where Ken Dodd said he appeared as a younger performer on the same bill as Max Miller in "about 1951, 1952". This return to the Palladium revitalised his career, and with it came a new recording contract, this time with Philips. He was back on radio and appeared on television, but his television appearances were never a great success. The new medium did not suit his style; he needed the feedback only a live theatre audience could give him and the freedom to use his naughty material.

Miller appeared regularly in all the large variety halls in and around London: the Hackney Empire, Chelsea Palace, Chiswick Empire, Finsbury Park Empire, Wood Green Empire and Metropolitan Music Hall. It was in the latter that he recorded the LP Max at the Met in 1957.

=== The final years ===
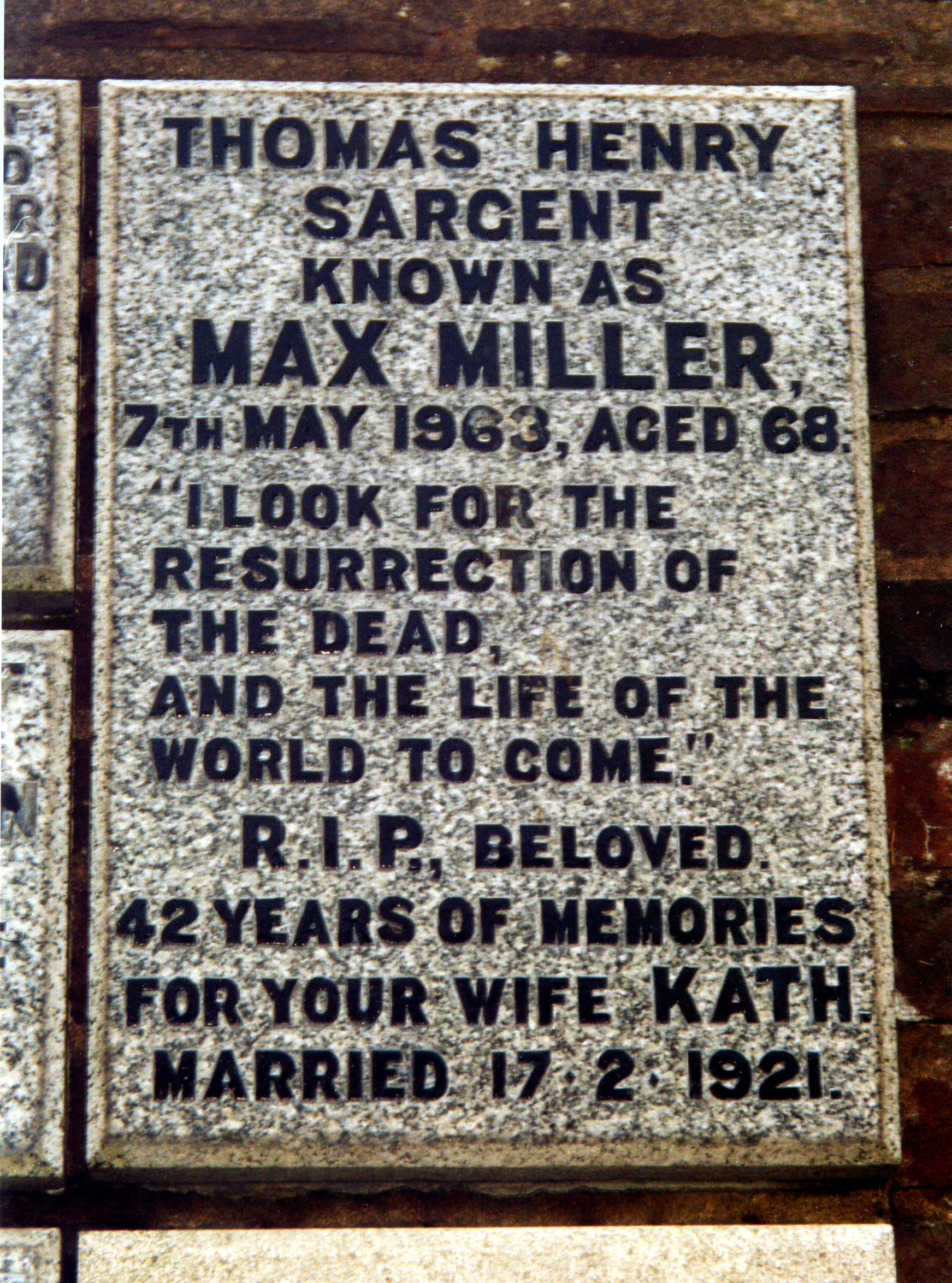
A tablet on the wall of the Garden of Remembrance, Downs Crematorium, Brighton

Max Miller performing live in London in 1962
Miller tells one of his trademark jokes

In 1958, Miller suffered a heart attack. After recovery, he needed to take life easier. His last West End appearance took place at the Palace Theatre in April 1959, and his last ever appearance in variety was in Folkestone in December 1960. Miller continued to make records, his last being in January 1963 with Lonnie Donegan.

=== Death ===
Miller died at home on 7 May 1963, aged 68, and was cremated at the Downs Crematorium, Brighton. A memorial tablet is mounted on a wall in the Garden of Remembrance. His wife Kathleen outlived him by nine years, dying in a Hove nursing home in 1972.

With dwindling work in variety, brought about by the rise of television, he had commented, "When I'm dead and gone, the game's finished."

It has frequently been suggested that John Osborne modelled the character Archie Rice in his play The Entertainer on Miller. John Osborne denied it and in his autobiography he wrote, "This is not so. Archie was a man. Max was a god, a saloon-bar Priapus".

== Censorship ==
The laws on censorship were strict during Miller's lifetime. Those responsible for censorship were the Lord Chamberlain in London and local watch committees in the regions. Miller's material needed approval by those bodies but by using innuendo, leaving out the last word or words of a joke, he could get away with much risqué and saucy material. However, he never swore or told a "dirty joke" on stage.

In one of his acts he would take from his pocket two books, one a white book and the other a blue book, explaining to the audience that these are joke books and asking them which the audience would like; the crowd almost always chose the blue book. The jokes in the blue book were the naughty ones. For example:

I went skating the other week with a young lady on ice and we'd been going around for quite a while and she kept on falling down.
I said, "Have you hurt yourself?”
She said, "No, I'm sorry to spoil your fun".
I said, "You're not spoiling my fun. It'll keep on ice".

Or he would leave the last word out for the audience to finish and blamed them if they laughed.

When roses are red,
They're ready for plucking.
When a girl is sixteen,
She's ready for ... 'Ere

He would then say, "I know exactly what you are saying to yourself, you're wrong, I know what you're saying. You wicked lot. You're the sort of people that get me a bad name!"

It was said that Miller was banned by the BBC twice, first in the 1930s, and then in the 1950s. However, these rumours only helped Miller's reputation as daring and naughty, and led to increased box office sales.

== Legacy ==
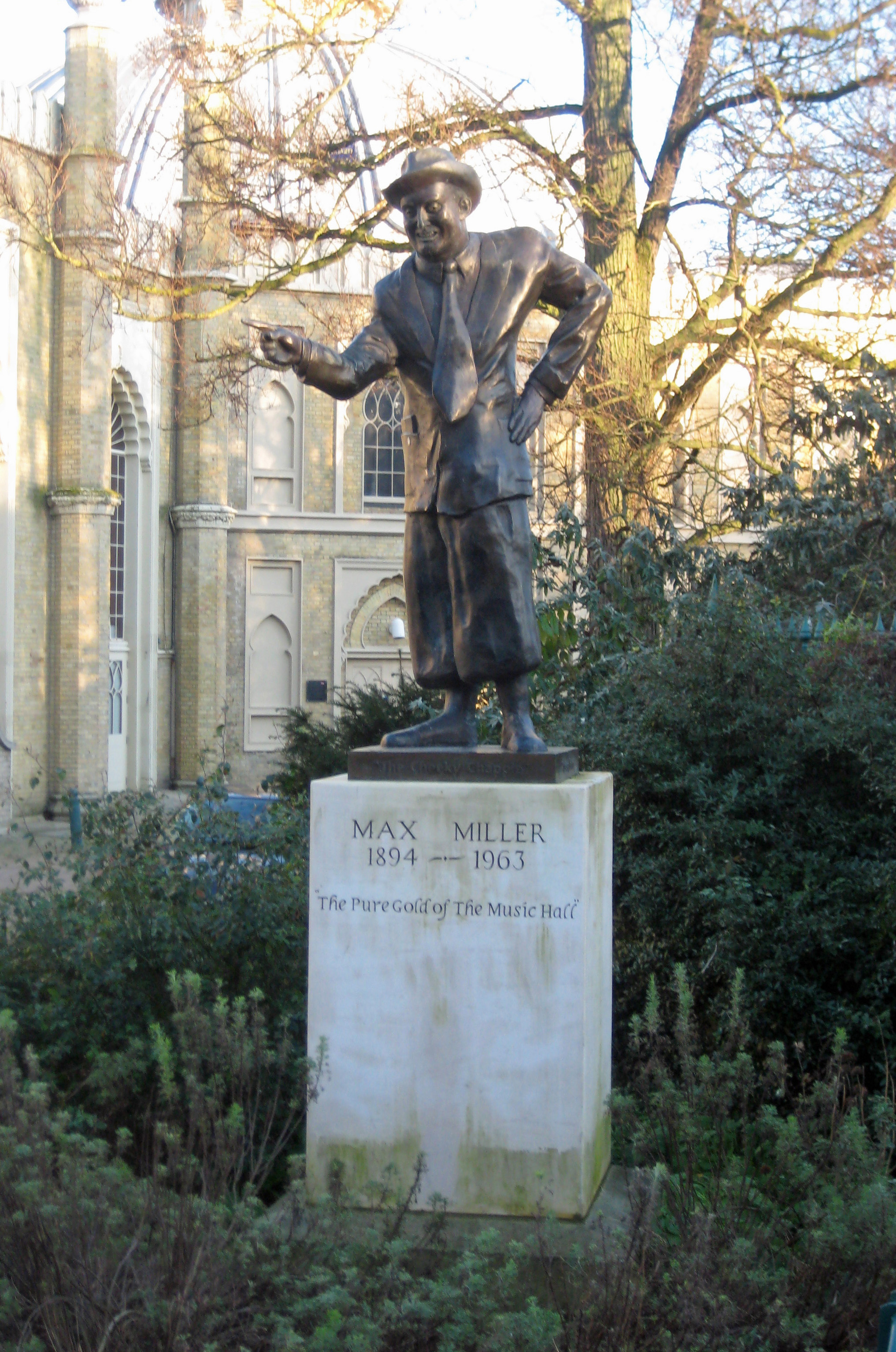
A bronze statue of Miller at the Pavilion Gardens, Brighton

Miller influenced many comedians during his lifetime and since. His jokes live on and are often told by other comedians. The comedian Walter William Bygraves became known as Max Bygraves after his impersonation of Miller. Miller was one of the many famous people on the cover of the Beatles' "Sgt. Pepper's Lonely Hearts Club Band".

The biography, Max Miller the Cheeky Chappie by John M. East was published in 1977. A paperback version was issued in 1993 with additional material. Two paperbacks containing Miller's jokes have been published: The Max Miller Blue Book compiled by Barry Took and illustrated by cartoonist Trog (1975) and The Max Miller Appreciation Society's Blue Book compiled by members with a foreword by Roy Hudd (2001).

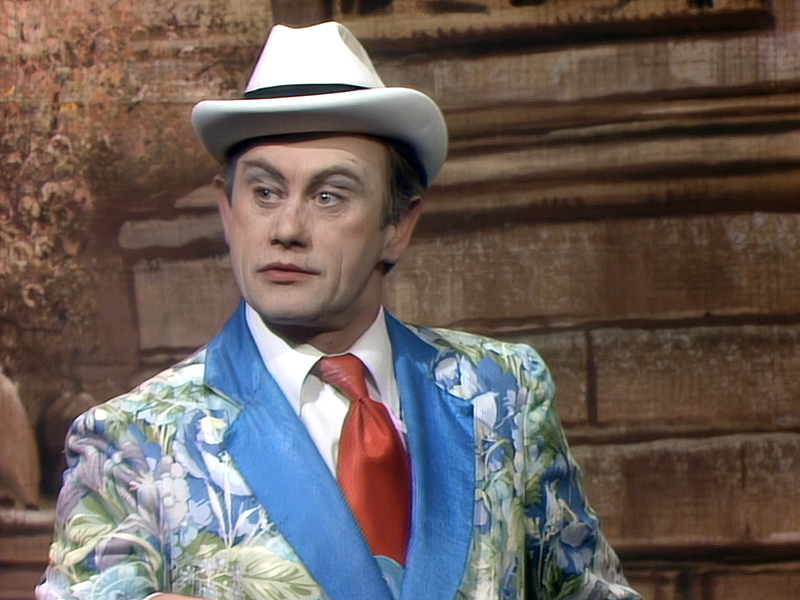
John Bardon as Miller, in the play Here's A Funny Thing

Several radio and television documentaries have been produced including Gerald Scarfe's The Girls Who Do (40 Minutes, BBC, 1989) and Heroes of Comedy: Max Miller (1995).

Here's A Funny Thing, a play featuring John Bardon by R.W. Shakespeare, was staged at the Edinburgh Fringe, and at the Fortune Theatre in London; it was broadcast on Channel Four in November 1982.

In 1999, the Max Miller Appreciation Society was formed in Brighton. Its main purpose is to keep his memory alive. It has erected a bronze statue sculptured by Peter Webster in the Royal Pavilion Gardens, New Road, Brighton (unveiled 1 May 2005; re-sited August 2007) and mounted two blue plaques on his former homes on Ashcroft in Kingston Lane, Shoreham-by-Sea (2000) and at 160 Marine Parade, Brighton (2006). In 2009, the Society curated an exhibition devoted to Miller's life and career in Bardsley's Fish Restaurant, Baker Street, Brighton.

In the British drama The Triple Echo from 1972, set during World War II, Glenda Jackson and Brian Deacon are listening to him and laughing aloud on the radio. He's telling a story about finding a man without any clothes on, standing in his house, and his wife said he's a nudist who came to use the phone.

== Catchphrases ==
He was renowned for his use of catchphrases, in performance

- "Now, there's a funny thing"
- "Listen! Listen!"
- "There'll never be another"
- "They don't make 'em anymore, duck!"
- "It's people like you who give me a bad name"
- "It's all clever stuff, no rubbish!"
- "How's your memory, gal?"
- "Miller's the name, Lady"
- "I don't care what I say, do I?"
- "That's nice, Maxie"
- "You can't help liking him"
- " 'Ere!"

== Filmography ==
Year	Title	Role
1933	The Good Companions	Millbrau
1933	Friday the Thirteenth	Joe
1933	Channel Crossing	James
1934	Princess Charming	Walter Chuff
1935	Things Are Looking Up	Joey
1935	Get Off My Foot	Herbert Cronk
1936	Educated Evans	Educated Evans
1937	Take It from Me	Albert Hall
1937	Don't Get Me Wrong	Wellington Lincoln
1938	Thank Evans	Educated Evans
1938	Everything Happens to Me	Charles Cromwell
1939	The Good Old Days	Alexander the Greatest
1940	Hoots Mon!	Harry Hawkins
1942	Asking for Trouble	Dick Smith

== Discography ==
- Oct 1932 Confessions of a Cheeky Chappie, pts 1 and 2: 78 rpm Broadcast Twelve 3266
- Oct 1935 Confessions of a Cheeky Chappie, pts 1 and 2: 78 rpm Rex 8604
- Mar 1935 Max the Auctioneer, pts 1 and 2: 78 rpm Rex 8665
- Dec 1936 Mary from the Dairy/ The Woman Improver: 78 rpm His Master's Voice BD385
- Jan 1937 Ophelia/Down in the Valley: 78 rpm His Master's Voice BD396
- Jan 1937 Backscratcher/Impshe: 78 rpm His Master's Voice BD408
- Feb 1937 Why Should the Dustman Get It All? /You Can't Blame Me for That: 78 rpm His Master's Voice BD417
- May 1937 How the So and So Can I Be Happy? /The Girl Next Door: 78 rpm His Master's Voice BD419
- Jun 1937 The Love Bug Will Bite You/Julietta: 78 rpm His Master's Voice BD427
- Jul 1937 You Can't Go Away Like That/Weeping Willow: 78 rpm His Master's Voice BD432
- Sep 1937 The Windmill/La De Da: 78 rpm His Master's Voice BD439
- Oct 1937 Put It Down/The Old Oak Tree: 78 rpm His Master's Voice BD450
- Nov 1937 I Never Thought That She'd Do That To Me/Let's All Have a Charabanc Ride: 78 rpm His Master's Voice BD458
- Mar 1937 Voice of the Stars extracts from the film Don't Get Me Wrong: 78 rpm VS4
- Dec 1937 Just Another Sally/The Christmas Dinner: 78 rpm His Master's Voice BD475
- Jan 1938 Annie the Farmer's Daughter/Ain't Love Grand?: 78 rpm His Master's VoiceBD482
- Mar 1938 She Said She Wouldn't/I'm the Only Bit of Comfort She's Got: 78 rpm His Master's Voice BD505
- Apr 1938 Winnie the Whistler/Doh Rae Me: 78 rpm His Master's Voice BD533
- May 1938 Every Sunday Afternoon/Um Ta Ra Rae: 78 rpm His Master's Voice BD541
- Jul 1938 Does She Still Remember? /I Bought a Horse: 78 rpm His Master's Voice BD563
- Sep 1938 The Girls Who Work Where I Work/Happy School Days: 78 rpm His Master's Voice BD583
- Nov 1938 She Was She Was She Was/Just in Fun: 78 rpm His Master's Voice BD597
- Dec 1938 Max Miller in the Theatre: At the Holborn Empire: 78 rpm His Master's Voice BD615
- Dec 1938 Max Miller in the Theatre: At the Holborn Empire: 78 rpm His Master's Voice BD616
- Dec 1938 Max Miller in the Theatre: At the Holborn Empire: 78 rpm His Master's Voice BD617
- Mar 1939 Max Miller in the Theatre Again: Holborn Empire: Second House: 78 rpm His Master's Voice BD646
- Mar 1939 Max Miller in the Theatre Again: Holborn Empire: Second House: 78 rpm His Master's Voice BD647
- Mar 1939 Max Miller in the Theatre Again: Holborn Empire: Second House: 78 rpm His Master's VoiceBD648
- Jun 1939 At the Bathing Parade/Everything Happens to Me 78 rpm His Master's Voice BD697
- Jul 1939 No, No, No/Maria Fell for Me: 78 rpm His Master's Voice BD710
- Dec 1939 Max Miller in the Theatre: At the Finsbury Park Empire: 78 rpm His Master's Voice BD770
- Dec 1939 Max Miller in the Theatre: At the Finsbury Park Empire: 78 rpm His Master's Voice BD771
- Dec 1939 Max Miller in the Theatre: At the Finsbury Park Empire: 78 rpm His Master's Voice BD772
- Dec 1940 Max Miller with the Forces (Somewhere in England): 78 rpm His Master's Voice BD883
- Dec 1940 Max Miller with the Forces (Somewhere in England): 78 rpm His Master's Voice BD884
- Dec 1940 Max Miller with the Forces (Somewhere in England): 78 rpm His Master's Voice BD885
- Dec 1941 Max Miller Entertains the War Workers: 78 rpm His Master's Voice BD980
- Dec 1941 Max Miller Entertains the War Workers: 78 rpm His Master's Voice BD981
- Dec 1941 Max Miller Entertains the War Workers: 78 rpm His Master's Voice BD982
- Jan 1942 That's the Way to Fall in Love/When You're Feeling Lonely/She'll Never Be the Same Again: 78 rpm His Master's Voice BD987
- Nov 1942 Max Miller in the Theatre: At the Finsbury Park Empire: 78 rpm His Master's Voice BD1022
- Nov 1942 Max Miller in the Theatre: At the Finsbury Park Empire: 78 rpm His Master's Voice BD1023
- Mar 1950 Come Hither with Your Zither/ I Never See Maggie Alone: 78 rpm His Master's Voice BD9878
- Dec 1953 Let's Have a Ride on Your Bicycle/My Old Mum: 78 rpm Philips PB199
- Mar 1954 Mary from the Dairy/ Voulez Vous Promenade?: 78 rpm Philips PB236
- Apr 1954 Pleasant Dreams/Oh Yes! She Knows Her Onions: (with the Beverley Sisters) 78 rpm Philips PB274
- Jun 1954 Friends and Neighbours/Two Little People: 78 rpm Philips PB296
- Nov 1954 Someone Else I'd Like to Be/Don't Forget Your First Sweetheart: 78 rpm Philips PB362
- Apr 1955 Something Money Can't Buy/London Belongs to Me: 78 rpm Philips PB427
- Oct 1955 The Budgie Song/Ain't It Ni-ice!: 78 rpm Philips PB518
- May 1956 The Girls I Like/The Mother Brown Story: 78 rpm Nixa N15050
- Nov 1957 Max at the Met (recorded at The Metropolitan Music Hall, London): LP Nixa NPT19026
- Jun 1958 Be Sincere/With a Little Bit of Luck: 78 rpm Nixa N15141
- Jun 1961 Influence/There's Always Someone Worse Off Than You: 45 rpm Pye 7N15349
- Jun 1961 That's Nice Maxie (recorded at the Black Lion, Patcham, Brighton): LP Pye NPL18064
- Sep 1962 The Cheeky Chappie (recorded at the Star Sound Studios, London): LP Pye NPL18079
- Jan 1963 The Market Song/Tit Bits: with Lonnie Donegan 45 rpm Pye 7N 15493

Since these recordings were released, most have been re-issues as compilations on LPs, cassettes and CDs)
