= Educated Evans (film) =

1936 film

- theatrical release poster
- Directed by: William Beaudine
- Written by: Frank Launder; Edgar Wallace (novel)
- Produced by: Irving Asher
- Starring: Max Miller; Hal Walters; Clarice Mayne
- Cinematography: Basil Emmott
- Production company: Warner Brothers-First National Productions
- Distributed by: Warner Bros.
- Release date: September 1936
- Running time: 86 minutes
- Country: United Kingdom
- Language: English

Educated Evans is a lost 1936 British comedy film, directed by William Beaudine and starring Max Miller, Clarice Mayne and Hal Walters. The film, set in the world of horse racing, was written by Frank Launder based on the 1924 novel of the same title by Edgar Wallace. It was made at Teddington Studios, with sets designed by Peter Proud. The story was later adapted into the BBC television series Educated Evans (1957–1958).

== Preservation status ==
The British Film Institute has classed Educated Evans as a lost film, included on its "75 Most Wanted" list of missing British feature films. The BFI National Archive holds a collection of stills but no film or video materials.

A sequel Thank Evans was released in 1938; it too is missing with only 1 minute of film found.

== Plot ==
Cockney racing tipster Evans is asked by a nouveau riche and socially aspirant couple to train a racehorse they have bought. The couple know nothing about horse racing, but believe that ownership of a successful racehorse will be their entrée into the high society racing set. Evans does not own a stable, so the horse has to live with him and his two lodgers in an urban mews. He has to keep constantly on his toes, as circumstances continually threaten to reveal to the horse's owners the ramshackle conditions in which the animal is kept.

Despite its less than ideal training environment, the horse turns out to have a natural talent and great racing potential. It does well in its outings, and is entered for a prestigious race. Shortly before the big day, disaster strikes when the horse is stolen. Evans has to track down and outwit the crooks, and manages to recover the horse in the nick of time. Feeling confident of the horse's chances, Evans places a substantial bet on it to win the race. In his excitement however, he makes a mistake and accidentally lays the bet on a no-hope nag at ridiculously long odds. The race turns out to be a sensation, with all the favourites including Evans' horse failing to finish for one reason or another. The hopeless carthorse Evans backed in error crosses the line first and he makes a huge financial profit.

== Cast ==
- Max Miller as Educated Evans
- Clarice Mayne as Emily Hackett
- Hal Walters as Nobby
- Albert Whelan as Sgt. Challoner
- Nancy O'Neil as Mary
- George Merritt as Joe Markham
- Frederick Burtwell as Hubert
- Julien Mitchell as Arthur Hackett
- Percy Walsh as Captain Reed
- Prince Monolulu as himself

== Reception ==
The Monthly Film Bulletin wrote: "Max Miller riotously funny as a racing tipster calling himself Educated Evans. He holds the field almost entirely on his own with a never-ending stream of apparently effortless wisecracks. His plausibility rescues him from all his escapades and the film ends with his winning a fortune by backing the wrong horse. The rest of the characters are very well cast to type with the exception of the girl Mary and her brother Jimmy who are altogether too refined for their surroundings. The race-course scenes are well photographed but the mews scenes were obviously painted sets. In all, good straightforward slapstick with farcical situations."

Kine Weekly called the film "an excellent popular booking... already past the box-office post".

The Daily Film Renter wrote: "Max Miller giving breezy performance as sharp-witted cockney tipster involved in hilarious misadventures with stolen racehorse. Star's continuous flow of cheeky patter constitutes riotously funny highlight, while realistic racing shots, suggestions of romance, and stabling of valuable steed in Camden Town tenement provide additional angles. A picture that will click with all audiences and will find favour everywhere."

Picturegoer wrote: "That the picture is a complete and riotously humorous success is mainly due to [Miller's] amazing vitality and untiring, quick-fire patter. The picture is the British equivalent to an American wise-cracking farce and William Beaudine has directed it with a speed and a perfect timing of gags which makes it equal to the best of its transatlantic prototypes."

Picture Show wrote: "Max Miller has a role that suits him down to-the ground in this comedy... and Max Miller's exuberant personality and his ceaseless, high-powered patter are practically all the film. The supporting cast is good."

McCarthy's Report wrote: "though a one man show, there is plenty of popular entertainment to be found in the dialogue, the animated racecourse scenes and many tricks of the trade".

== See also ==
- List of films about horses
- List of films about horse racing
