= Channel 4 Sheffield Pitch =

British annual competition

The Channel 4 Sheffield Pitch is an annual competition sponsored by British public-service television broadcaster Channel 4, which seeks to offer one new documentary maker the chance to make a film for the company. It takes place within the Sheffield International Documentary Festival, and at £30,000 represents the largest single award for documentary film in the UK.

== Format ==
Potential pitchers, who cannot already be established filmmakers, must submit a very brief description of their idea for a documentary film. The eight most compelling ideas are selected, and the shortlisted directors must then pitch their idea to a panel of Channel 4 commissioners in front of an industry audience at the annual Sheffield International Documentary Festival. The winning director is awarded a £30,000 commission to make their film, and professional mentorship from a Channel 4 editor.

The award, now in its fifth year, is part of the station's 4Talent initiative to help new talent break into the very competitive UK television industry. Other projects in the scheme include FourDocs and the popular 3 Minute Wonder short film awards.

== Recent winners ==
- 2006 – Haryun Kim, English Wonderland
- 2005 – Havana Marking, The Crippendales
- 2004 – Dominic Waugh, I Speak Animal
