= Here's A Funny Thing =

1982 stage play and television program

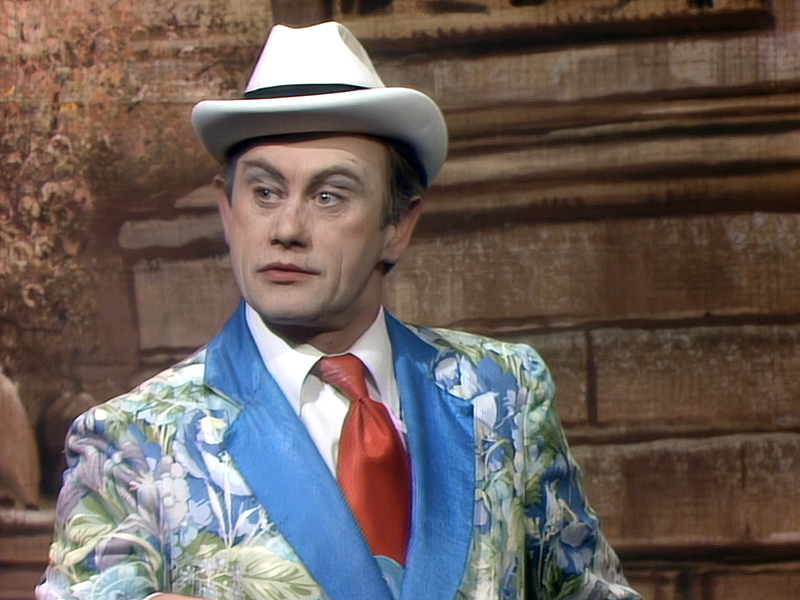
- John Bardon as Max Miller
- Created by: R.W. Shakespeare and John Bardon
- Directed by: Bryan Izzard

Production
- Producer: Neil Anthony
- Production company: The Bright Thoughts Company

Original release
- Network: Channel 4
- Release: 20 November 1982

Here's a Funny Thing is a biographical one-man stage play and television program written by R.W. Shakespeare and performed by actor John Bardon. It depicts the life and career of the legendary British variety comedian Max Miller, known as "The Cheeky Chappie." Bardon received critical acclaim for his portrayal of Miller, weaving the comedian’s famous "blue" routines and songs into a narrative of his personal and professional life.

== Overview ==
The play is structured as a recreation of a Max Miller performance. The action of the production is split between two locations: a "seedy 1950s rehearsal room" and the stage of the London Palladium. This dual setting allowed the play to explore Miller’s private life alongside his stage act. Bardon, dressed in Miller's signature gaudy floral suits and trilby, performs stand-up routines while simultaneously breaking the "fourth wall" to reveal the man behind the persona. The title is derived from one of Miller's most famous catchphrases.

== Production history ==
Bardon had seen Miller on stage as a child, and later became fascinated with the idea of performing as Miller. He approached journalist R.W. Shakespeare to help create a play based on Miller's life Bardon researched the role extensively and sought input from other legendary comedians, including Tommy Cooper and Ken Dodd, who shared their favourite Max Miller gags with him to help refine the performance. The play was commissioned by William Gaunt and first performed at the Liverpool Playhouse before moving to the Edinburgh Fringe Festival and the Lyric Hammersmith Its success led to a West End run at the Fortune Theatre in London, opening in January 1982. It was a passion project for Bardon, who was quoted as saying: "Miller was an ordinary bloke. After months doing his act I know why he did it. The feeling of elation after making people laugh is tremendous. Often after a show, I couldn't sleep."

== Reception ==
The play was described as a "skilful actor’s vision" that hinted at Miller's charisma and "wit bordering on the obscene". A late night performance at the Edinburgh Fringe was described in the Daily Telegraph as "a delightful surprise", and the paper especially noted Bardon's "brilliant mimicry" of Miller. Allan Massie, theatre critic for The Scotsman, observed that "John Bardon is Miller to the life - the timing, the roguishness, the delivery of the double entendres, absolutely perfect...It is the funniest show I have seen in years. I can't remember when I last laughed with such a sense of profound release". Ned Chaillet, writing in The Times, noted that "Mr. Bardon's presentation is so happily rude and Mr. Shakespeare's selection of material is so spontaneously right that it makes for a lively trip back in comic time".

== Television adaptation ==
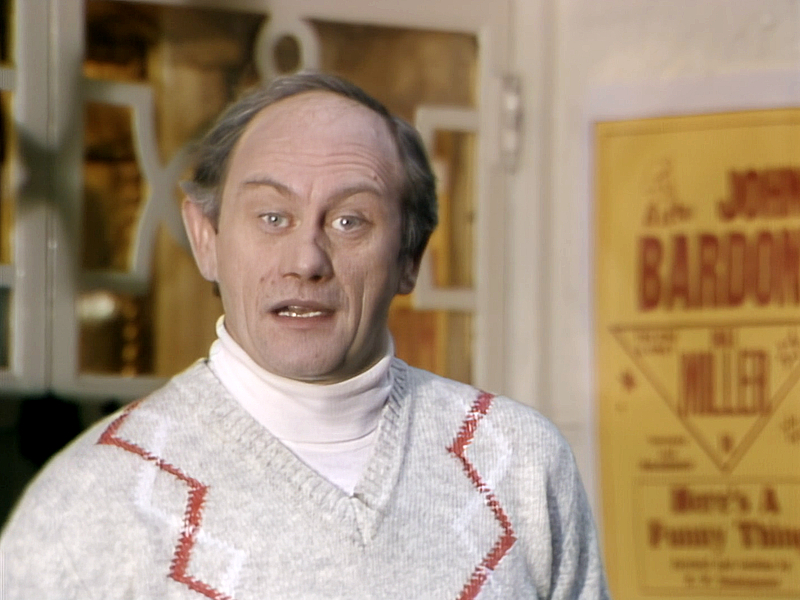
John Bardon introduces the televised version of Here's A Funny Thing from outside the Fortune Theatre stage door.

A televised version of the play was Channel 4's very first commissioned piece of entertainment and was transmitted on 20 November 1982. It was made by the Bright Thoughts Company, and directed by Bryan Izzard. Recorded at the Fortune Theatre, author R.W. Shakespeare provided a truncated version of the play, lasting 55 minutes in total. Bardon introduced his performance from the Fortune's stage door. To date it is the only dramatized account of Miller's life to have been filmed. A cinema screening of the programme in May 2026 was announced by the Duke of York's in Brighton
