= Mary from the Dairy =

Mary From the Dairy is a comic song made famous by British comedian Max Miller, The Cheeky Chappie, in the 1930s and 1940s. With words by Max Miller, Sam Kern & James Walsh and music by Sam Kern, it became Miller's signature tune, played by the orchestra when he walked on and left the stage. It was a mildly risqué song about Max Miller falling for Mary from the dairy and includes the lines "I don't do things by halves / I'll let you see my calves / and they're not the same shaped calves as Nellie Dean's."

Sam Kern, the composer, said that the idea for the song came to him as he was sitting in the Express Dairies in Charing Cross Road. The waitress was called Mary. He started writing the song on a cigarette packet, took it to an orchestrator Arthur Parry and rushed to the Mile End Empire where he met Miller. He said to him that this song will do for you what "Sally" did for Gracie Fields. Miller told him that he would meet him the next day outside the Express Dairies. They agreed a price and Miller bought the song for £4.

Miller's version of the story was somewhat different. He recollected how it came into being. He said that he was offered dozens of numbers by songwriters but hardly any suited his style. He was talking to Sam Kern in the Express Dairies one day and he told him he had an idea for a song, "Mary from the Milk Bar". Kern said it did not sound quite right and suggested "Mary from the Dairy".

Miller recorded the song in 1936 which was released on an His Master's Voice 10-inch gramophone record. He recorded it again in March 1954 on the Philips label. The sheet music was published in 1950.

Miller sang the song playing the character ‘’Harry Hawkins’’ in the feature film Hoots Mon! released in 1940.
