= Educated Evans (TV series) =

British TV comedy series (1957–1958)

- Genre: Comedy
- Based on: Educated Evans by Edgar Wallace
- Directed by: Eric Fawcett
- Starring: Charlie Chester; Michael Balfour; Jack Melford
- Country of origin: United Kingdom
- Original language: English
- No. of series: 2
- No. of episodes: 24

Production
- Producer: Eric Fawcett
- Running time: 30 minutes
- Production company: BBC

Original release
- Network: BBC One
- Release: 2 October 1957 – 24 June 1958

Educated Evans is a British comedy television series that aired on the BBC in 24 episodes between 2 October 1957 and 24 June 1958. It is based on the 1924 novel Educated Evans by Edgar Wallace, about a racing tipster. The story had previously been made into a 1936 film Educated Evans. The title role was played by Charlie Chester, whose comedic style was similar to that of Max Miller who had starred in the earlier film. Jack Melford starred as his antagonist, Detective Sergeant Miller.

Other actors who appeared in episodes of the series included Sid James, Jackie Collins, Georgina Cookson, Jill Adams, Sydney Tafler, Liz Fraser, Deryck Guyler, Sam Kydd, Eunice Gayson, Danny Green, Robert Raglan, Anita Sharp-Bolster, Ray Cooney, Jack MacGowran, Ian Fleming, Erik Chitty, Diane Hart, Terence Alexander, Alan Tilvern, Charles Farrell and Mavis Villiers.

== Main cast ==
- Charlie Chester as 'Educated' Evans
- Michael Balfour as Man in Pub
- Jack Melford as Det. Sgt. Miller
- Myrtle Reed as Gertrude, the Barmaid
- Dorothy Summers as Mrs. Boltons
- Keith Pyott as Inspector Pine
- Leonard Sharp as Old Sam Toggs
- Mae Bacon as Mrs. Wilkes
- Patricia Hayes as Emma Toggs

== Bibliography ==
- Stephen Wagg. Because I Tell a Joke or Two: Comedy, Politics and Social Difference. Routledge, 2004.
