= Hoots Mon! (1940 film) =

1940 film by Roy William Neill

- Opening titles
- Directed by: Roy William Neill
- Written by: Roy William Neill; Jack Henley; John Dighton
- Produced by: Samuel Sax
- Starring: Max Miller; Florence Desmond; Hal Walters; Davina Craig
- Cinematography: Basil Emmott
- Edited by: Leslie Norman
- Music by: Bretton Byrd
- Production company: Warner Bros.
- Distributed by: Warner Bros.
- Release date: 27 April 1940
- Running time: 77 minutes
- Country: United Kingdom
- Language: English
- Budget: £18,895
- Box office: £13,996

Hoots Mon! is a 1940 British comedy film directed by Roy William Neill and starring Max Miller, Florence Desmond and Hal Walters. It was written by Neill, Jack Henley and John Dighton. The film follows an English comedian who attempts his luck on the Scottish stage, and develops a rivalry with a local performer. Miller sings "The Charabanc Song" and his signature tune "Mary from the Dairy".

== Plot ==
Harry Hawkins, billed as "England's funniest comedian" and Jenny MacTavish, the "Bluebelle of Scotland" are arch-rivals. To counter Jenny's suggestion that he would be a flop in Scotland Harry takes his act to Glasgow, where it fails miserably. His manager then books him at the Thistle Club, a haunt for hardcore Scottish Nationalists, where Harry is beaten and ends up in hospital. His "nurse" turns out to be Jenny, in disguise, and the pair are reconciled.

== Production ==
The film was produced at Teddington Studios by Warner Brothers' British subsidiary. It was the ninth and final film that the music hall star Miller made for Warner Brothers. The film's sets were by Norman Arnold, the resident art director at Teddington.

== Cast ==
- Max Miller as Harry Hawkins
- Florence Desmond as Jenny McTavish
- Hal Walters as Chips
- Davina Craig as Annie
- Garry Marsh as Charlie Thompson
- Edmund Willard as Sandy McBride
- Gordon McLeod as McDonald
- Robert Gall as Alec
- Mark Daly as Campbell

== Reception ==
The Monthly Film Bulletin wrote: "This film is mainly a vehicle for Max Miller's jokes and Florence Desmond's impersonations, both of which are excellently put over. For those who like dialogue that flickers like lightning, magnificent fooling and broad humour this is definitely a picture to see."

Kine Weekly wrote: "Broad comedy of rivalry on the music-hall stage so contrived as to introduce logically the individual acts of the popular stars. Max Miller puts over breathless and, at times, spicy patter as only he can, and, at the same time, indulges in healthy slapstick, while Florence Des-mond is responsible for any brilliant impersonations of stage and screen celebrities, Incidentally, both can act. Star contribution is not all, the inimitable acts are augmented by laughable knockabout fare in which Cockney and Scottish humour play equal parts. In short; the show is good for a laugh in practically any company. Cast-iron comedy bet for the crowd."
