= 3 Minute Wonder =

Channel 4 documentary slot

- Title card
- Country of origin: United Kingdom

Production
- Running time: 5 minutes

Original release
- Release: 3 November 2003 – 30 November 2010

3 Minute Wonder is a short Channel 4 television slot that broadcasts first time directors' three-minute TV programmes in the middle of the channel's weekday primetime schedule. It offers first-time directors and assistant producers the opportunity to air their work to a large audience, and in doing so, to take a first step into the competitive UK film industry.

The 3 Minute Wonder strand is part of the Channel 4's 4Talent initiative to help new talent break into the very competitive UK television industry. Other projects in the scheme include FourDocs and the Channel 4 Sheffield Pitch documentary competition.

Channel 4 offers new directors £4000 and their assistance in making their shorts which are then broadcast at 7:55 pm every weekday.

The films shown on the series are primarily documentaries that generally highlight a current issue that is not in the public eye, for instance synesthesia or domestic abuse.

It has previously featured Karl Pilkington in a series of 4 and was mentioned on The Ricky Gervais Show.
