= Renowned Films =

Renowned Films is a London/LA based production company, co-founded by Duane Jones.

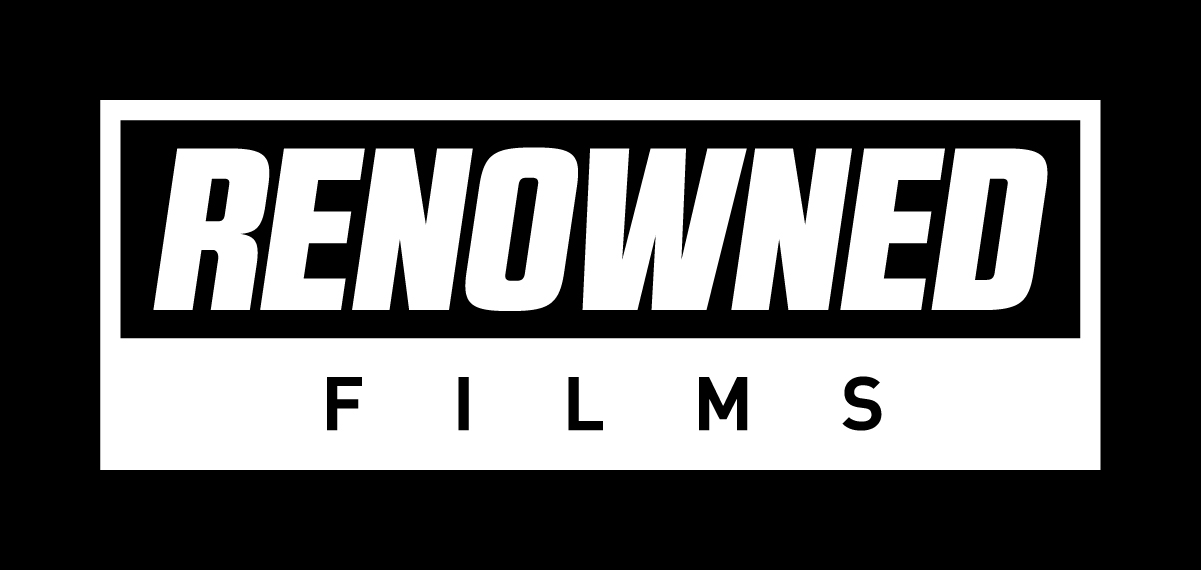
Renowned Films Logo

Renowned Films has produced documentary, format and reality television alongside its branded content division that has worked with clients including Adidas, Selfridges, Apple and Beats by Dre. Renowned's projects include 'The Peng Life' with the Chicken Connoisseur for Channel 4, 'NYPD Biggest Gang in New York?' for the BBC, 'The Women Who Kill Lions', 'Top Dad with Ashley Walters' and series 3 of 'Random Acts' for Channel 4, as well as Pranksterz for ITV2.

In 2015 Channel 4 took an equity stake in Renowned Films as part of its £20 million Growth Fund, which has made the company one of the fastest growing indie production companies in the UK.

In 2017 Critical Content acquired an undisclosed stake in Renowned with Channel 4 exiting the business. Critical Content CEO Tom Forman joined the board.
