= Channel 4 =

British free-to-air television channel

- Green version of the 2022 logo, used since 2023

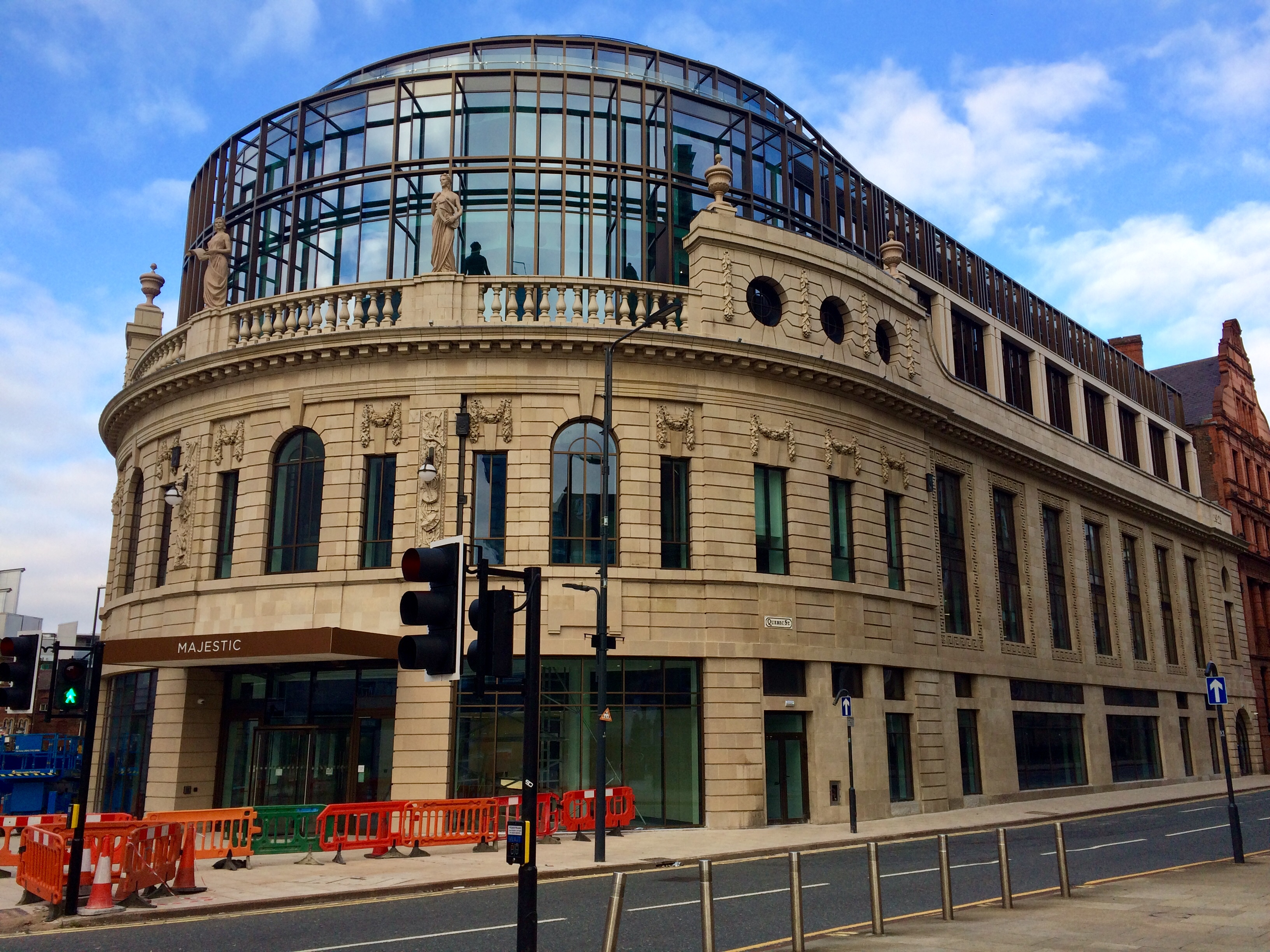
- Channel 4 national headquarters Majestic, Leeds
- Country: United Kingdom
- Broadcast area: United Kingdom; Republic of Ireland; Isle of Man; Channel Islands; Gibraltar
- Headquarters: 124 Horseferry Road, London, England; Majestic, Leeds, England

Programming
- Language: English
- Picture format: 1080i/1080p HDTV (Note: 1080p25 sometimes only on Freeview.) (downscaled to 576i for the SDTV feed)
- Timeshift service: Channel 4 +1

Ownership
- Owner: Channel Four Television Corporation
- Key people: Priya Dogra (CEO)
- Sister channels: 4seven; E4; E4 Extra; Film4; More4

History
- Launched: 2 November 1982; 44 years ago

Links
- Website: channel4.com

Availability

Terrestrial
- Freeview: Channel 4 (SD; 7 in Wales); Channel 15 (+1); Channel 104 (HD; 110 in Wales)

Streaming media
- Channel 4: Watch live
- TVPlayer: Watch live (UK only)
- Sky Go: Watch live (UK and Ireland only)
- Virgin TV Anywhere: Watch live (UK only); Watch live (+1, UK only)

Channel 4 is a British free-to-air public broadcast television channel owned and operated by Channel Four Television Corporation. It is publicly owned but, unlike the BBC, it receives no public funding and is funded entirely by its commercial activities, including advertising. It began its transmission in 1982 and was established to provide a fourth television service in the United Kingdom. At the time, the only other channels were the licence-funded BBC1 and BBC2, and a single commercial broadcasting network, ITV.

Originally a subsidiary of the Independent Broadcasting Authority (IBA), the station is now owned and operated by Channel Four Television Corporation, a public corporation of the Department for Culture, Media and Sport, which was established in 1990 and came into operation in 1993. Until 2010, Channel 4 did not broadcast in Wales, but many of its programmes were re-broadcast there by the Welsh fourth channel S4C. In 2010, Channel 4 extended service into Wales and became a nationwide television channel. The network's national headquarters is at the Majestic, Leeds, with its London headquarters at 124 Horseferry Road, London and creative hubs in Manchester, Glasgow and Bristol.

== History ==
=== Conception ===
Before Channel 4 and S4C, Britain had three terrestrial television services: BBC1, BBC2, and ITV, with BBC2 the last to launch in 1964. The Broadcasting Act 1980 began the process of adding a fourth channel; Channel Four Television Company was formally created in 1981, along with its Welsh counterpart.

The notion of a second commercial broadcaster in the United Kingdom had been around since the inception of ITV in 1954 and its subsequent launch in 1955; the idea of an "ITV2" was long expected and pushed for. Indeed, television sets sold throughout the 1970s and early 1980s often had a spare tuning button labelled "ITV 2" or "IBA 2". Throughout ITV's history and until Channel 4 finally became a reality, a perennial dialogue existed between the GPO, the government, the ITV companies and other interested parties, concerning the form such an expansion of commercial broadcasting would take. Most likely, politics had the biggest impact leading to a delay of almost three decades before the second commercial channel became a reality.

One benefit of the late arrival of the channel was that its frequency allocations at each transmitter had already been arranged in the early 1960s when the launch of an "ITV2" was anticipated.

=== Wales ===
At the time the fourth service was being considered, a movement in Wales lobbied for the creation of dedicated service that would air Welsh language programmes, then only catered for at off-peak times on BBC Wales and HTV. The campaign was taken so seriously by Gwynfor Evans, former president of Plaid Cymru, that he threatened the government with a hunger strike were it not to honour the plans.

The result was that Channel 4 as seen by the rest of the United Kingdom would be replaced in Wales by S4C (Sianel Pedwar Cymru, meaning "Channel Four Wales" in Welsh). Operated by a specially created authority, S4C would air programmes in Welsh made by HTV, the BBC and independent companies. Initially, limited frequency space meant that Channel 4 could not be broadcast alongside S4C, though some Channel 4 programmes would be aired at less popular times on the Welsh variant; this practice continued until the closure of S4C's analogue transmissions in 2010, at which time S4C became a fully Welsh channel. With this conversion of the Wenvoe transmitter group in Wales to digital terrestrial broadcasting on 31 March 2010, Channel 4 became a nationwide television channel for the first time.

Since then, carriage on digital cable, satellite and digital terrestrial has introduced Channel 4 to Welsh homes where it is now universally available.

=== 1982–1992: Launch and IBA control ===
After some months of test broadcasts, the new broadcaster began scheduled transmissions on 2 November 1982 from Scala House, the former site of the Scala Theatre. Its initial broadcasts reached 87% of the United Kingdom.

The first voice heard on Channel 4's opening day of 2 November 1982 was that of continuity announcer Paul Coia who said: "Good afternoon. It's a pleasure to be able to say to you, welcome to Channel 4." Following the announcement, the channel played a montage of clips from its programmes set to the station's signature tune, "Fourscore", written by David Dundas, which would form the basis of the station's jingles for its first decade. The first programme to air on the channel was the teatime game show Countdown, produced by Yorkshire Television, at 16:45. The first person to be seen on Channel 4 was Richard Whiteley, with Ted Moult being the second. Whiteley hosted the gameshow for 23 years until his death in 2005. The first woman on the channel, contrary to popular belief, was not Whiteley's Countdown co-host Carol Vorderman, but a lexicographer only ever identified as Mary. Whiteley opened the show with the words: "As the countdown to a brand new channel ends, a brand new countdown begins." On its first day, Channel 4 also broadcast the soap opera Brookside, which often ran storylines thought to be controversial; this ran until 2003.

After three days, ITV chiefs called for founding chief executive Jeremy Isaacs to resign due to poor ratings. Critics called it "Channel Bore" and "Channel Snore".

At its launch, Channel 4 committed itself to providing an alternative to the existing channels, an agenda in part set out by its remit which required the provision of programming to minority groups. In step with its remit, the channel became well received both by minority groups and the arts and cultural worlds during this period under Isaacs, during which the channel gained a reputation for programmes on the contemporary arts. There was also a provision for more mainstream entertainment, such as Top C's and Tiaras, The Optimist and Here's A Funny Thing.

Two programmes captured awards from the Broadcasting Press Guild in March 1983: best comedy for The Comic Strip Presents…Five Go Mad in Dorset, and best on-screen performance in a non-acting role for Tom Keating in his series On Painters. Channel 4 co-commissioned Robert Ashley's television opera Perfect Lives, which it premiered over several episodes in 1984. The channel often did not receive mass audiences for much of this period, as might be expected for a station focusing on minority interests. During this time, Channel 4 also began the funding of independent films, such as the Merchant Ivory docudrama The Courtesans of Bombay.

In 1987, Richard Attenborough replaced Edmund Dell as chairman. In 1988, Michael Grade became CEO.

In 1992, Channel 4 faced its first libel case which was brought by Jani Allan, a South African journalist, who objected to her representation in Nick Broomfield's documentary The Leader, His Driver and the Driver's Wife.

=== 1993–2006: Channel Four Television Corporation ===
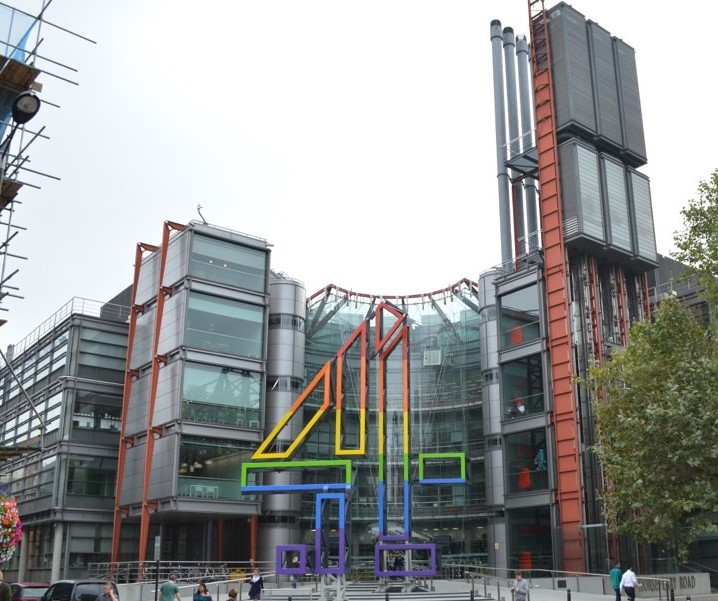
Channel 4 London headquarters, 124 Horseferry Road, London

After control of the station passed from the Channel Four Television Company to the Channel Four Television Corporation in 1993, a shift in broadcasting style took place. Instead of aiming for minority tastes, it began to focus on the edges of the mainstream, and the centre of the mass market itself. It began to show many American programmes in peak viewing time, far more than it had previously done.

In September 1993, the channel broadcast the direct-to-TV documentary film Beyond Citizen Kane, in which it displayed the dominant position of the Rede Globo (now TV Globo) television network, and discussed its influence, power, and political connections in Brazil.

Throughout the 1990s and 2000s, Channel 4 gave many popular and influential American comedy and drama series their first exposure on British television, such as Friends, Cheers, Will & Grace, NYPD Blue, ER, Desperate Housewives, Homicide: Life on the Street, Without a Trace, Home Improvement, Frasier, Lost, Nip/Tuck, Third Watch, The West Wing, Ally McBeal, Freaks and Geeks, Roseanne, Dawson's Creek, Oz, Sex and the City, The Sopranos, Scrubs, King of the Hill, Babylon 5, Stargate SG-1, Star Trek: Enterprise, Andromeda, Family Guy, South Park and Futurama.

In the early 2000s, Channel 4 began broadcasting reality formats such as Big Brother and obtained the rights to broadcast mass appeal sporting events like cricket and horse racing. This new direction increased ratings and revenues. The popularity of Big Brother led to the launches of other, shorter-lived new reality shows to chase the populist audience, such as The Salon, Shattered and Space Cadets.

In addition, the corporation launched several new television channels through its new 4Ventures offshoot, including Film4, At the Races, E4 and More4.

Partially in reaction to its new "populist" direction, the Communications Act 2003 directed the channel to demonstrate innovation, experimentation, and creativity, appeal to the tastes and interests of a culturally diverse society, and include programmes of an educational nature which exhibit a distinctive character.

On 31 December 2004, Channel 4 launched a new visual identity in which the logo is disguised as different objects and the "4" can be seen from an angle.

Under the leadership of Freeview founder Andy Duncan, 2005 saw a change of direction for Channel 4's digital channels. The company made E4 free-to-air on digital terrestrial television, and launched a new free-to-air digital channel called More4. By October, Channel 4 had joined the Freeview consortium. By July 2006, Film4 had likewise become free-to-air and restarted broadcasting on digital terrestrial.

Venturing into radio broadcasting, 2005 saw Channel 4 purchase 51% of shares in the now defunct Oneword radio station, with UBC Media holding on to the remaining shares. New programmes such as the weekly, half-hour The Morning Report news programme were among some of the new content Channel 4 provided for the station, with the name 4Radio being used. As of early 2009, however, Channel 4's future involvement in radio remained uncertain.

=== Since 2006 ===
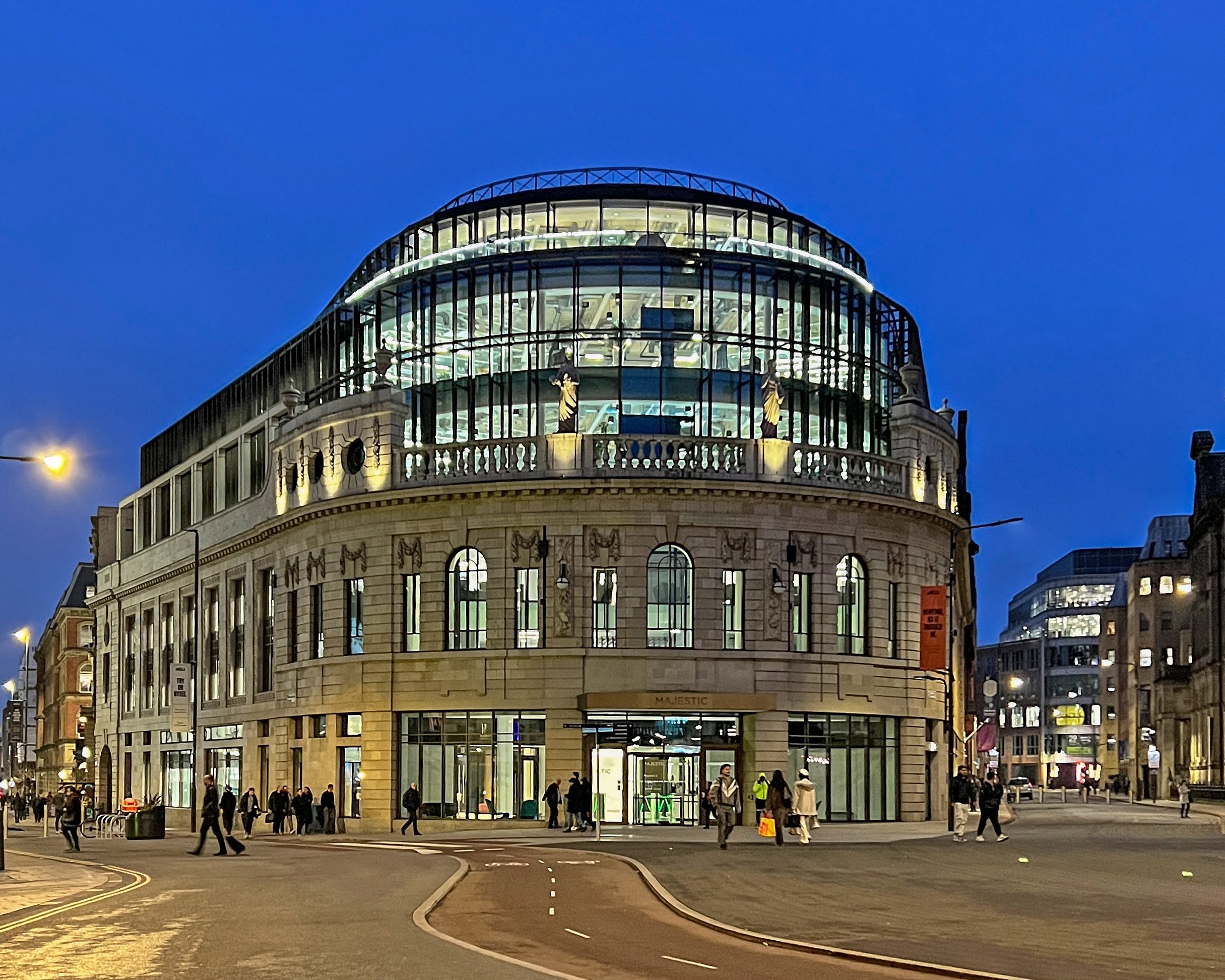
In 2020, Channel 4 opened a new national headquarters in the redeveloped Majestic Building on City Square, Leeds.

Before the digital switchover, Channel 4 raised concerns over how it might finance its public service obligations afterward. In April 2006, it was announced that Channel 4's digital switch-over costs would be paid from licence fee revenue.

In July 2007, Channel 4 paid £28 million for a 50% stake in the TV business of British media company EMAP, which had seven music video channels. On 15 August 2008, 4Music was launched across the UK. Channel 4 announced interest in launching a high-definition version of Film4 on Freeview, to coincide with the launch of Channel 4 HD, but the fourth HD slot was given to Channel 5 instead.

On 2 November 2007, the station celebrated its 25th birthday. It showed the first episode of Countdown, an anniversary Countdown special, and a special edition of The Big Fat Quiz. It used the original multicoloured 1982–1996 blocks logo on presentation, and idents using the Fourscore jingle throughout the day.

In November 2009, Channel 4 launched a week of 3D television, broadcasting selected programmes each night using stereoscopic ColorCode 3D technology. The accompanying 3D glasses were distributed through Sainsbury's supermarkets.

On 29 September 2015, Channel 4 revamped its presentation for a fifth time; the new branding downplayed the "4" logo from most on-air usage, in favour of using the shapes from the logo in various forms. Four new idents were filmed by Jonathan Glazer, which featured the shapes in various real-world scenes depicting the "discovery" and "origins" of the shapes. The full logo was still occasionally used, but primarily for off-air marketing. Channel 4 also commissioned two new corporate typefaces, "Chadwick", and "Horseferry" (a variation of Chadwick with the aforementioned shapes incorporated into its letter forms), for use across promotional material and on-air.

In June 2017, it was announced that Alex Mahon would be the next chief executive, and would take over from David Abraham, who left in November 2017.

On 31 October 2017, Channel 4 introduced a new series of idents continuing the theme, this time depicting the logo shapes as having formed into an anthropomorphic "giant" character.

On 25 September 2021, Channel 4 and several of its sub-channels went off the air after an incident at Red Bee Media's playout centre in west London. Channel 4, More4, Film4, E4, 4Music, The Box, Box Hits, Kiss, Magic and Kerrang! stopped transmitting, but 4seven was not impacted. The incident still affected a number of the channels by 30 September. The London Fire Brigade confirmed that a gas fire prevention system at the site had been activated, but firefighters found no sign of fire. Activation of the fire suppression system caused catastrophic damage to some systems, such as Channel 4's system for subtitles, signing, and audio description. A backup subtitling system also failed, leaving Channel 4 unable to provide access services to viewers. This situation was criticised by the National Deaf Children's Society, which complained to the broadcasting watchdog. A new subtitling, signing and audio description system had to be built from scratch and the service began to return at the end of October. In June 2022, after a six-month long investigation, Ofcom found that Channel 4 had breached its broadcast licence conditions on two grounds: missing its subtitles quota on Freesat for 2021 and failure to effectively communicate with affected audiences.

On 23 December 2021, Jon Snow presented Channel 4 News for the last time, after 32 years as a main presenter on the programme, making him one of the UK's longest-serving presenters on a national news programme.

In April 2025, it was announced that Alex Mahon would step down as chief executive of Channel 4 in the summer of that year. She was succeeded on an interim basis by Jonathan Allan, the broadcaster's chief operating officer, while a search for a permanent replacement was launched.

==== Abandoned privatisation ====
Channel 4's parent company, Channel Four Television Corporation, was considered for privatisation by the governments of Margaret Thatcher, John Major and Tony Blair. In 2014, the Cameron-Clegg coalition government drew up proposals to privatise the corporation but the sale was blocked by the Liberal Democrat Business Secretary Vince Cable. In 2016, the future of the channel was again looked into by the government, with analysts suggesting several options for its future. In June 2021, the government of Boris Johnson considered selling the channel.

In April 2022, the Department for Culture, Media and Sport acknowledged that ministerial discussions were taking place regarding the sale of Channel Four Television Corporation. The channel's chief executive, Alex Mahon, expressed disappointment at this, saying that its vision for the future was "rooted in continued public ownership".

In January 2023, government minister Michelle Donelan confirmed that the plans to sell Channel 4 were scrapped and that it would remain in public ownership for the foreseeable future.

== Public service remit ==
Channel 4 was established with, and continues to hold, a remit of public service obligations which it must fulfil. The remit has changed periodically, as dictated by various broadcasting and communications acts, and is regulated by the various authorities Channel 4 has been answerable to; originally the IBA, then the ITC and now Ofcom.

The preamble of the remit as per the Communications Act 2003 states that:

The public service remit for Channel 4 is the provision of a broad range of high quality and diverse programming which, in particular:

- demonstrates innovation, experiment and creativity in the form and content of programmes;
- appeals to the tastes and interests of a culturally diverse society;
- makes a significant contribution to meeting the need for the licensed public service channels to include programmes of an educational nature and other programmes of educative value; and
- exhibits a distinctive character.

The remit also involves an obligation to provide programming for schools, and a substantial amount of programming produced outside of Greater London.

== Carriage ==
Channel 4 was carried from its beginning on analogue terrestrial, the standard means of television broadcast in the United Kingdom. It continued to be broadcast through these means until the changeover to digital terrestrial television in the United Kingdom was complete. Since 1998, it has been universally available on digital terrestrial, and the Sky platform (initially encrypted, though encryption was dropped on 14 April 2008 and is now free of charge and available on the Freesat platform) as well as having been available from various times in various areas, on analogue and digital cable networks.

Due to its special status as a public service broadcaster with a specific remit, it is afforded free carriage on the terrestrial platforms, in contrast with other broadcasters such as ITV.

Channel 4 is available outside the United Kingdom; it is widely available in the Republic of Ireland, the Netherlands, Belgium and Switzerland. The channel is registered to broadcast within the European Union/EEA through the Luxembourg Broadcasting Regulator (ALIA).

Since 2019, it has been offered by British Forces Broadcasting Service (BFBS) to members of the British Armed Forces and their families around the world, BFBS Extra having previously carried a selection of Channel 4 programmes.

The Channel 4 website allows people in the United Kingdom to watch Channel 4 live. Previously, some programmes (mostly international imports) were not shown. It was previously carried by Zattoo until the operator removed the channel from its platform.

Channel 4 also makes some of its programming available "on demand" via cable and the internet through the Channel 4 VoD service.

== Funding ==
During its first decade, Channel 4 was funded by subscriptions collected by the IBA from the ITV regional companies, in return for which each company had the right to sell advertisements on the fourth channel in its own region and keep the proceeds. This meant that ITV and Channel 4 were not in competition with each other, and often promoted each other's programmes.

A change in funding came about under the Broadcasting Act 1990 when the new corporation was afforded the ability to fund itself. Originally this arrangement left a "safety net" guaranteed minimum income should the revenue fall too low, funded by large insurance payments made to the ITV companies. Such a subsidy was never required, however, and these premiums were phased out by the government in 1998. After the link with ITV was cut, the cross-promotion which had existed between ITV and Channel 4 also ended.

In 2007, owing to severe funding difficulties, the channel sought government help and was granted a payment of £14 million over a six-year period. The money was to have come from the television licence fee, and would have been the first time that money from the licence fee had been given to any broadcaster other than the BBC. However, the plan was scrapped by the Secretary of State for Culture, Media and Sport, Andy Burnham, ahead of "broader decisions about the future framework of public service broadcasting". The broadcasting regulator Ofcom released its review in January 2009 in which it suggested that Channel 4 would preferably be funded by "partnerships, joint ventures or mergers".

As of 2022, it breaks even in much the same way as most privately run commercial stations through the sale of on-air advertising, programme sponsorship, and the sale of any programme content and merchandising rights it owns, such as overseas broadcasting rights and domestic video sales. For example, as of 2012 its total revenues were £925 million with 91% derived from sale of advertising. It also has the ability to subsidise the main network through any profits made on the corporation's other endeavours, which have in the past included subscription fees from stations such as E4 and Film4 (now no longer subscription services) and its "video-on-demand" sales. In practice, however, these other activities are loss-making, and are subsidised by the main network. According to Channel 4's published accounts, for 2005 the extent of this cross-subsidy was some £30 million.

== Programming ==
From 1982 to 2026 Channel 4 has been a "publisher-broadcaster", meaning that it commissioned or "bought" all of its programming from companies independent of itself. It was the first UK broadcaster to do so on a significant scale; such commissioning was a stipulation which was included in its licence to broadcast. In consequence, numerous independent production companies emerged, though external commissioning on the BBC and in ITV has become regular practice, as well as on the numerous stations that launched later. Although it was the first British broadcaster to commission all of its programmes from third parties, Channel 4 was the last terrestrial broadcaster to outsource its transmission and playout operations (to Red Bee Media), after 25 years in-house.

The 2024 Media Act permits Channel 4 to produce its own programming for the first time although 35% must be made by independent companies. Channel 4 Television Corporation announced that it would set up a separate television production company. It also committed to sourcing at least 50% of its programming outside London.

Channel 4 was established with a specific intention of providing programming to groups of minority interests, not catered for by its competitors, which at the time were only the BBC and ITV.

Channel 4 also pioneered the concept of 'stranded programming', where seasons of programmes following a common theme would be aired and promoted together. Some would be very specific, and run for a fixed period of time; the 4 Mation season, for example, showed innovative animation. Other, less specific strands, were (and still are) run regularly, such as T4, a strand of programming aimed at teenagers, on weekend mornings (and weekdays during school/college holidays); Friday Night Comedy, a slot where the channel would pioneer its style of comedy commissions, 4Music (now a separate channel) and 4Later, an eclectic collection of offbeat programmes transmitted in the early hours of the morning.

For a period in the mid-1980s, some sexually explicit arthouse films would be screened with a red triangle graphic in the upper right of the screen.

In recent years concerns have arisen regarding a number of programmes made for Channel 4, that are believed missing from all known archives.

=== Most watched programmes ===
The following is a list of the 10 most watched shows on Channel 4 since launch, based on Live +28 data supplied by BARB, and archival data published by Channel 4.

Rank	Programme or film	Viewers (millions)	Date
1	A Woman of Substance	13.85	4 January 1985
2	Big Brother	13.74	27 July 2001
3	A Woman of Substance	13.20	3 January 1985
4	Four Weddings and a Funeral	12.40	15 November 1995
5	A Woman of Substance	11.55	2 January 1985
6	The Great British Bake Off	11.21	22 September 2020
7	Gregory's Girl	10.75	8 January 1985
8	The Great British Bake Off	10.54	30 October 2018
9	The Great British Bake Off	10.13	31 October 2017
10	The Great British Bake Off	10.03	27 August 2019

=== Comedy ===
During the station's early days, the screenings of innovative short one-off comedy films produced by a rotating line-up of alternative comedians went under the title of The Comic Strip Presents. The Optimist was the world's first dialogue-free television comedy, and one of the channel's earliest commissioned programs. The Tube and Saturday Live/Friday Night Live also launched the careers of a number of comedians and writers. Channel 4 broadcast a number of popular American imports, including Cheers, The Cosby Show, Roseanne, Home Improvement, Friends, Sex and the City, Everybody Loves Raymond, South Park, Family Guy, Futurama, Frasier, Scrubs, and Will & Grace. Other significant US acquisitions include The Simpsons, for which the station was reported to have paid £700,000 per episode for the terrestrial television rights back in 2004, and continues to air on the channel on weekends.

In April 2010, Channel 4 became the first UK broadcaster to adapt the American comedy institution of roasting to British television, with A Comedy Roast.

In 2010, Channel 4 organised Channel 4's Comedy Gala, a comedy benefit show in aid of Great Ormond Street Children's Hospital. With over 25 comedians appearing, it billed it as "the biggest live stand up show in United Kingdom history". Filmed live on 30 March in front of 14,000 at The O2 Arena in London, it was broadcast on 5 April. This has continued to 2016.

In 2021, Channel 4 decided to revive The British Comedy Awards as part of its Stand Up To Cancer programming. The ceremony, billed as The National Comedy Awards was due to be held in the spring of 2021 but was delayed twice due to the Coronavirus pandemic and eventually held a year later.

=== Factual and current affairs ===
Channel 4 has a strong reputation for history programmes and documentaries. Its news service Channel 4 News is supplied by ITN, whilst its long-standing investigative documentary series, Dispatches, gains attention from other media outlets. Its live broadcast of the first public autopsy in the UK for 170 years, carried out by Gunther von Hagens in 2002 and the 2003 one-off stunt Derren Brown Plays Russian Roulette Live proved controversial.

A season of television programmes about masturbation, called Wank Week, was to be broadcast in the United Kingdom by Channel 4 in March 2007. The series came under public attack from senior television figures, and was pulled amid claims of declining editorial standards and concern for the channel's public service broadcasting credentials.

=== FourDocs ===
FourDocs was an online documentary site provided by Channel 4. It allowed viewers to upload their own documentaries to the site for others to view. It focused on documentaries of between 3 and 5 minutes. The website also included an archive of classic documentaries, interviews with documentary filmmakers and short educational guides to documentary-making. It won a Peabody Award in 2006. The site also included a strand for documentaries of under 59 seconds, called "Microdocs".

=== Schools programming ===
Channel 4 is obliged to carry schools programming as part of its remit and licence.

==== ITV Schools on Channel 4 ====
Since 1957, ITV had produced schools programming, which became an obligation. In 1987, five years after the station was launched, the IBA afforded ITV free carriage of these programmes during Channel 4's then-unused weekday morning hours. This arrangement allowed the ITV companies to fulfil their obligation to provide schools programming, whilst allowing ITV itself to broadcast regular programmes complete with advertisements. During the times in which schools programmes were aired Central Television provided most of the continuity with play-out originating from Birmingham.

==== Channel 4 Schools/4Learning ====
After the restructuring of the station in 1993, ITV's obligations to provide such programming on Channel 4's airtime passed to Channel 4 itself, and the new service became Channel 4 Schools, with the new corporation administering the service and commissioning its programmes, some still from ITV, others from independent producers.

In March 2008, the 4Learning interactive new media commission Slabovia.tv was launched. The Slabplayer online media player showing TV shows for teenagers was launched on 26 May 2008.

The schools programming has always had elements which differ from its normal presentational package. In 1993, the Channel 4 Schools idents featured famous people in one category, with light shining on them in front of an industrial-looking setting supplemented by instrumental calming music. This changed in 1996 with the circles look to numerous children touching the screen, forming circles of information then picked up by other children. The last child would produce the Channel 4 logo in the form of three vertical circles, with another in the middle and to the left containing the Channel 4 logo.

=== Religious programmes ===
From the outset, Channel 4 did not conform to the expectations of conventional religious broadcasting in the UK. John Ranelagh, first commissioning editor for religion, made his priority 'broadening the spectrum of religious programming' and more 'intellectual' concerns. He also ignored the religious programme advisory structure that had been put in place by the BBC, and subsequently adopted by ITV. Ranelagh's first major commission caused a furore, a three-part documentary series called Jesus: The Evidence. The programmes, transmitted during the Easter period of 1984, seemed to advocate the idea that the Gospels were unreliable, Jesus may have indulged in witchcraft, and that he may not have even existed. The series triggered a public outcry, and marked a significant moment in the deterioration in the relationship between the UK's broadcasting and religious institutions.

=== Film ===
Numerous genres of film-making – such as comedy, drama, documentary, adventure/action, romance and horror/thriller – are represented in the channel's schedule. From the launch of Channel 4 until 1998, film presentations on C4 would often be broadcast under the "Film on Four" banner.

In March 2005, Channel 4 screened the uncut Lars von Trier film The Idiots, which includes unsimulated sexual intercourse, making it the first UK terrestrial channel to do so. The channel had previously screened other films with similar material but censored and with warnings.

Since 1 November 1998, Channel 4 has had a digital subsidiary channel dedicated to the screening of films. This channel launched as a paid subscription channel under the name "FilmFour", and was relaunched in July 2006 as a free-to-air channel under the current name of "Film4". The Film4 channel carries a wide range of film productions, including acquired and Film4-produced projects. Channel 4's general entertainment channels E4 and More4 also screen feature films at certain points in the schedule as part of their content mix.

=== Global warming ===
On 8 March 2007, Channel 4 screened a documentary, The Great Global Warming Swindle stating that global warming is "a lie" and "the biggest scam of modern times". The programme's accuracy was disputed on multiple points and commentators criticised it for being one-sided, observing that the mainstream position on global warming is supported by the scientific academies of the major industrialised nations. There were 246 complaints to Ofcom as of 25 April 2007, including allegations that the programme falsified data. The programme was criticised by scientists and scientific organisations, and various scientists who participated in the documentary claimed their views had been distorted.

Against Nature: An earlier controversial Channel 4 programme made by Martin Durkin which was also critical of the environmental movement and was charged by the UK's Independent Television Commission for misrepresenting and distorting the views of interviewees by selective editing.

The Greenhouse Conspiracy: An earlier Channel 4 documentary broadcast on 12 August 1990, as part of the Equinox series, in which similar claims were made. Three of the people interviewed (Lindzen, Michaels and Spencer) were also interviewed in The Great Global Warming Swindle.

=== Ahmadinejad's Christmas speech ===
In the Alternative Christmas address of 2008, a Channel 4 tradition since 1993 with a different presenter each year, Iranian President Mahmoud Ahmadinejad made a thinly veiled attack on the United States by claiming that Christ would have been against "bullying, ill-tempered and expansionist powers".

The broadcast was rebuked by human rights activists, politicians and religious figures, including Peter Tatchell, Louise Ellman, Ron Prosor and Rabbi Aaron Goldstein. A spokeswoman for the Foreign and Commonwealth Office said: "President Ahmadinejad has, during his time in office, made a series of appalling anti-Semitic statements. The British media are rightly free to make their own editorial choices, but this invitation will cause offence and bemusement not just at home but among friendly countries abroad".

However, Channel 4 was defended by Stonewall director Ben Summerskill who stated: "In spite of his ridiculous and often offensive views, it is an important way of reminding him that there are some countries where free speech is not repressed...If it serves that purpose, then Channel 4 will have done a significant public service". Dorothy Byrne, Channel 4's head of news and current affairs, said in response to the station's critics: "As the leader of one of the most powerful states in the Middle East, President Ahmadinejad's views are enormously influential... As we approach a critical time in international relations, we are offering our viewers an insight into an alternative world view...Channel 4 has devoted more airtime to examining Iran than any other broadcaster and this message continues a long tradition of offering a different perspective on the world around us".

=== Random Acts ===
Random Acts is a daily arts strand on Channel 4 running from 3rd October 2011-present. Over the course of a year, it will showcase 260 specially commissioned three-minute films chosen for their bold and original expressions of creativity.

=== 4Talent ===
4Talent is an editorial branch of Channel 4's commissioning wing, which co-ordinates Channel 4's various talent development schemes for film, television, radio, new media and other platforms and provides a showcasing platform for new talent.

There are bases in London, Birmingham, Glasgow and Belfast, serving editorial hubs known respectively as 4Talent National, 4Talent Central England, 4Talent Scotland and 4Talent Northern Ireland. These four sites include features, profiles and interviews in text, audio and video formats, divided into five zones: TV, Film, Radio, New Media and Extras, which covers other arts such as theatre, music and design. 4Talent also collates networking, showcasing and professional development opportunities, and runs workshops, masterclasses, seminars and showcasing events across the UK.

==== 4Talent Magazine ====
4Talent Magazine is the creative industries magazine from 4Talent, which launched in 2005 as TEN4 magazine under the editorship of Dan Jones. 4Talent Magazine is currently edited by Nick Carson. Other staff include deputy editor Catherine Bray and production editor Helen Byrne. The magazine covers rising and established figures of interest in the creative industries, a remit including film, radio, TV, comedy, music, new media and design.

Subjects are usually UK-based, with contributing editors based in Northern Ireland, Scotland, London and Birmingham, but the publication has been known to source international content from Australia, America, continental Europe and the Middle East. The magazine is frequently organised around a theme for the issue, for instance giving half of November 2007's pages over to profiling winners of the annual 4Talent Awards.

An unusual feature of the magazine's credits is the equal prominence given to the names of writers, photographers, designers and illustrators, contradicting standard industry practice of more prominent writer bylines. It is also recognisable for its 'wraparound' covers, which use the front and back as a continuous canvas – often produced by guest artists.

Although 4Talent Magazine is technically a newsstand title, a significant proportion of its readers are subscribers. It started life as a quarterly 100-page title, but has since doubled in size and is now published bi-annually.

=== Scheduling ===
Since the 2010s, Channel 4 has become the public service broadcaster most likely to amend its schedule at short notice, if programmes are not gaining sufficient viewers in their intended slots. Programmes which have been heavily promoted by the channel before launch and then have lost their slot a week later include Sixteen: Class of 2021. This was a fly-on-the-wall school documentary which lost its prime 9pm slot after one episode on 31 August 2021, even after a four-star review in The Guardian. Channel 4 moved the next episode to a late night (post-primetime) slot on a different day and continued to broadcast the remainder of the four-part series in this timeslot.

Also in 2021, the channel launched Epic Wales: Valleys, Mountains and Coast, a version of its More4 documentaries The Pennines: Backbone of Britain, The Yorkshire Dales and The Lakes and Devon and Cornwall. set in Wales. Epic Wales: Valleys, Mountains and Coast. was initially broadcast in a prime Friday night slot at 8pm, in the hour before its comedy shows, but was dropped by the channel before the series was completed and replaced by repeats. In February 2022, the channel scheduled a new version of the show under the title Wonderous Wales with a Saturday night slot at 8pm but after one episode, it decided to take this series out of its schedule, moving up a repeat of Matt Baker: Our Farm in the Dales to 8pm and putting an episode of Escape to the Chateau in Baker's slot at 7pm.

Other programmes moved out of primetime in 2022, include Mega Mansion Hunters, Channel 4's answer to Selling Sunset, which saw its third and final episode moved past midnight with repeats put in the schedule before it, and Richard Hammond's Crazy Contraptions, a primetime Friday night competitive engineering show which saw its grand final moved to 11pm on a Sunday night. Instead of Hammond's competition, Channel 4 decided to schedule the fifth series of Devon and Cornwall in its place at 8pm on Friday nights, with this documentary being put up against Channel 5's World's Most Scenic Railway Journeys in the same timeslot.

A new series of Unreported World was due to start on 18 February 2022 with a report by Seyi Rhodes in South Sudan, but was dropped due to an extended storm report on Channel 4 News. When the programme was rescheduled for following Fridays, it was dropped again as Channel 4 News was extended due to the 2022 Russian invasion of Ukraine. Winter Paralympics: Today in Beijing was due to take the Unreported World slot from 11 March 2022 though this sports programme also stood a chance of being moved around the schedule to continue the extended news programmes reporting on the conflict. The invasion of Ukraine has also prompted Channel 4 to acquire and schedule the comedy series Servant of the People as a last minute replacement. The programme stars the current President of Ukraine Volodymyr Zelenskyy as an ordinary man who gets elected to run the country, and was shown on 6 March 2022 along with the documentary Zelenskyy: The Man Who Took on Putin.

In addition to these shows, O.T. Fagbenle's sitcom Maxxx was pulled from youth TV channel E4, after one episode from the series had been broadcast on 2 April 2020, with Channel 4 deciding to keep the series off-air until Black History Month, with the series going out on the main channel from October 2020.

In May 2022, the reality dating show Let's Make a Love Scene was scrapped after one episode with the second programme in the series, hosted by Ellie Taylor, pulled from the 20 May schedule and replaced with an episode of 8 Out of 10 Cats Does Countdown. The first edition was negatively received, with Anita Singh, the arts and entertainments editor for The Telegraph writing that the show was "the most ill-conceived programme idea since Prince Edward dreamt up It's a Royal Knockout".

== Presentation ==
1982

1996

1999

2004

2022

Former logos

Since its launch in 1982, Channel 4 has used the same logo which consists of a stylised numeral "4" made up of nine differently-shaped blocks.

The original version was designed by Martin Lambie-Nairn and his partner Colin Robinson and was the first UK channel ident made using advanced computer generation (the first electronically generated ident was on BBC2 in 1979, but this was two-dimensional). It was designed in conjunction with Bo Gehring Aviation of Los Angeles and originally depicted the "4" in red, yellow, green, blue and purple. The music accompanying the ident was called "Fourscore" and was composed by David Dundas; it was later released as a single alongside a B-side, "Fourscore Two", although neither reached the UK charts. In November 1992, "Fourscore" was replaced by new music.

In 1996, Channel 4 commissioned Tomato Films to revamp the "4", which resulted in the "Circles" idents showing four white circles forming up transparently over various scenes, with the "4" logo depicted in white in one of the circles.

In 1999, Spin redesigned the logo to feature in a single square that sat on the right-hand side of the screen, whilst various stripes would move along from left to right, often lighting the squared "4" up. Like the previous "Circles" idents from 1996 (which was made by Tomato Films), the stripes would be interspersed with various scenes potentially related to the upcoming programme.

The logo was made three-dimensional again in 2004 when it was depicted in filmed scenes that show the blocks forming the "4" logo for less than a second before the action moves away again.

In 2015, a new presentation package by the network's in-house agency 4Creative was introduced. Directed by filmmaker Jonathan Glazer, the "4" logo itself was downplayed on-air in favour of idents and bumpers featuring the individual blocks as objects, including idents depicting them as "Kryptonite"-like items of fascination (such as being excavated, and viewed under a microscope for scientific study) that reflect Channel 4's remit of being "irreverent, innovative, alternative and challenging". Musician Micachu composed music for the idents. This theme continued in 2017, with new idents by Dougal Wilson that focused on an anthropomorphic "giant" constructed from the blocks, and its interactions in everyday life. A new acoustic rendition of "Fourscore" was also composed for the idents.

In September 2018, all of Channel 4's digital channels underwent a rebranding by ManvsMachine and 4Creative, including new logos that incorporate variants of the Lambie-Nairn "4". The rebranding was intended to give Channel 4's family of services a more uniform brand identity, while still allowing room for individualized elements that reflect their positioning and programming.

The original 1982 ident was given a one-off revival on 28 December 2020, as a tribute to Lambie-Nairn after his death three days earlier. It was also used on 22 January 2021 as part of the 80s-themed "takeover" to promote the premiere of It's a Sin, which was set during the 1980s AIDS crisis.

To mark the network's 40th anniversary, Channel 4 began to phase in another rebranding in November 2022, and announced that new idents were being produced that would be "an unexpected and daring portrait of Britain retold". In an effort to emphasise its digital platforms, it was announced that the "All4" branding would be dropped from Channel 4's video on-demand platform, in favour of marketing it under the "Channel 4" name with no disambiguation. The new idents, "Modern Britain", premiered in June 2023, featuring looping cycles of themed scenes built around the Channel 4 logo by various artists.

== Regions/international ==
=== Regions ===
Channel 4 has, since its inception, broadcast identical programmes and continuity throughout the United Kingdom (excluding Wales where it did not operate on analogue transmitters). At launch this made it unique, as both the BBC and ITV had long-established traditions of providing regional variations in their programming in different areas of the country. Since the launch of subsequent British television channels, Channel 4 has become typical in its lack of regional programming variations.

A few exceptions exist to this rule for programming and continuity:

- Some of Channel 4's schools' programming (1980s-early 1990s) was regionalised due to differences in curricula between different regions.
- Advertising on Channel 4 does contain regular variation: prior to 1993, when ITV was responsible for selling Channel 4's advertising, each regional ITV company would provide the content of advertising breaks, covering the same transmitter area as themselves, and these breaks were often unique to that area. After Channel 4 became responsible for its own advertising, it continued to offer advertisers the ability to target particular audiences and divided its coverage area into six regions: London, South, Midlands, North, Northern Ireland and Scotland. Wales does not have its own advertising region; instead, its viewers receive the southern region on digital platforms intentionally broadcast to the area or the neighbouring region where terrestrial transmissions spill over into Wales. Channel 5 and ITV Breakfast use a similar model to Channel 4 for providing their own advertising regions, despite also having a single national output of programming.

Part of Channel 4's remit covers the commissioning of programmes from outside London. Channel 4 has a dedicated director of nations and regions, Stuart Cosgrove, who is based in a regional office in Glasgow. As his job title suggests, it is his responsibility to foster relations with independent producers based in areas of the United Kingdom (including Wales) outside London.

=== International ===
Channel 4 is available in the Republic of Ireland, with ads tailored to the Irish market. The channel is registered with the broadcasting regulators in Luxembourg for terms of conduct and business within the EU/EEA while observing guidelines outlined by Ireland's BAI code. Irish advertising sales are managed by Media Link in Dublin. Where Channel 4 does not hold broadcasting rights within the Republic of Ireland such programming is unavailable. For example, the series Glee was not available on Channel 4 on Sky in Ireland due to it broadcasting on TV3 within Ireland. Currently, programming available on Channel 4 is available within the Republic of Ireland without restrictions. Elsewhere in Europe, the UK version of the channel is available.

=== Future possibility of regional news ===
With ITV plc pushing for much looser requirements on the amount of regional news and other programming it is obliged to broadcast in its ITV regions, the idea of Channel 4 taking on a regional news commitment has been considered, with the corporation in talks with Ofcom and ITV over the matter. Channel 4 believes that a scaling-back of such operations on ITV's part would be detrimental to Channel 4's national news operation, which shares much of its resources with ITV through their shared news contractor ITN. At the same time, Channel 4 also believes that such an additional public service commitment would bode well in on-going negotiations with Ofcom in securing additional funding for its other public service commitments.

== Channel 4 HD ==
Channel 4 HD logo (2007–2015)

In mid-2006, Channel 4 ran a six-month closed trial of HDTV, as part of the wider Freeview HD experiment via the Crystal Palace transmitter to London and parts of the home counties, including the use of Lost and Desperate Housewives as part of the experiment, as US broadcasters such as ABC already have an HDTV back catalogue.

On 10 December 2007, Channel 4 launched a high-definition television simulcast of Channel 4 on Sky's digital satellite platform, after Sky agreed to contribute toward the channel's satellite distribution costs. It was the first full-time high-definition channel from a terrestrial UK broadcaster.

On 31 July 2009, Virgin Media added Channel 4 HD on channel 146 (later on channel 142, now on channel 141) as part of the M pack. On 25 March 2010, Channel 4 HD appeared on Freeview channel 52 with a placeholding caption, ahead of a commercial launch on 30 March 2010, coinciding with the commercial launch of Freeview HD. On 19 April 2011, Channel 4 HD was added to Freesat on channel 126. As a consequence, the channel moved from being free-to-view to free-to-air on satellite during March 2011. With the closure of S4C Clirlun in Wales on 1 December 2012, on Freeview, Channel 4 HD launched in Wales on 2 December 2012.

The channel carries the same schedule as Channel 4, broadcasting programmes in HD when available, acting as a simulcast. Therefore, SD programming is broadcast upscaled to HD. The first true HD programme to be shown was the 1996 Adam Sandler film Happy Gilmore. From launch until 2016 the presence of the 4HD logo on screen denoted true HD content.

On 1 July 2014, Channel 4 +1 HD, an HD simulcast of Channel 4 +1, launched on Freeview channel 110. It closed on 22 June 2020 to help make room on COM7 following the closure of COM8 on Freeview. 4Seven HD were removed from Freeview also.

On 20 February 2018, Channel 4 announced that Channel 4 HD and All 4 would no longer be supplied on Freesat from 22 February 2018. Channel 4 HD returned to the platform on 8 December 2021, along with the music channel portfolio of The Box Plus Network.

On 27 September 2022, the other 6 advertising regions of Channel 4 (South, Midlands, North, Scotland, Northern Ireland and Rep of Ireland) were made available in HD on Sky and Virgin Media. Prior to this, Channel 4 HD was only available in the London advertising region.

== Video on demand ==
Channel 4's video on demand service, known simply as "Channel 4" since April 2023, launched in November 2006 as "4oD", and was renamed "All 4" in March 2015. The service offers a variety of programmes recently shown on Channel 4, E4, More4 or from their archives, though some programmes and movies are not available due to rights issues.

== Teletext services ==
=== 4-Tel/FourText ===
Channel 4 originally licensed an ancillary teletext service to provide schedules, programme information and features. The original service was called 4-Tel, and was produced by Intelfax, a company set up especially for the purpose. It was carried in the 400s on Oracle. In 1993, with Oracle losing its franchise to Teletext Ltd, 4-Tel found a new home in the 300s, and had its name shown in the header row. Intelfax continued to produce the service and in 2002 it was renamed FourText.

=== Teletext on 4 ===
In 2003, Channel 4 awarded Teletext Ltd a ten-year contract to run the channel's ancillary teletext service, named Teletext on 4. The service closed in 2008, and Teletext is no longer available on Channel 4, ITV and Channel 5.

== Awards and nominations ==
Year	Association	Category	Nominee(s)	Result
2016	Broadcast Awards	Channel of the Year	Channel 4	Won
2017	Diversity in Media Awards	Broadcaster of the Year	Channel 4	Nominated
2023	DIVA Awards	Brand of Organisation of the Year	Channel 4	Won

== See also ==
- Annan Committee
- Big 4
- Channel 4 Banned season
- Channel 4 Sheffield Pitch
- List of Channel 4 television programmes
- Renowned Films
- 3 Minute Wonder
