= Albert Whelan =

Australian music hall entertainer (1875–1961)

- Born: Albert Waxman; 5 May 1875; Melbourne, Victoria, Australia
- Died: 19 February 1961 (aged 85); London, England
- Occupations: Singer, entertainer, actor
- Website: albertwhelan.com

Albert Whelan (born Albert Waxman; 5 May 1875 – 19 February 1961) was an Australian popular singer and entertainer, who was prominent in English music halls during the first half of the 20th century.

== Biography ==
The son of an immigrant Polish Jewish pawnbroker, Whelan was born in Melbourne, Victoria, in 1875 (as was his fellow music-hall performer Florrie Forde). He worked as an accountant and mechanic before moving with a friend in 1898 to the goldfields at Coolgardie, Western Australia, where the pair entertained the prospectors and miners by singing and dancing. After returning to Melbourne, he appeared on local variety bills.

He emigrated to Britain in 1901, making his debut in a novelty dance act at the Empire, Leicester Square, and later appearing in the musical The Belle of New York. He rapidly honed his act, and settled on a style which would vary little over his career. Immaculately dressed in bow-tie, hat, coat, scarf, tails, and gloves, he sang, danced and played the piano. He was an excellent mimic, and adapted easily to changing vocal styles. Whelan was acknowledged as one of the first entertainers to have a signature tune, appearing on-stage (and exiting at the end of his act) whistling Robert Vollstedt's waltz from Die Lustige Brüder ("The Jolly Brothers").

According to theatre historian Roy Busby, "[He] presented a polished turn as a debonair man about town, strolling onto the stage, nonchalantly whistling... rather like a man all dressed up with no place to go...". His entrance to the stage, and then the painstaking removal of his accessories, took some three minutes, as did his exit, leading on one occasion to him simply entering casually, and then exiting without any intermediate performance, after his time slot had been reduced in length.

He toured the United States in 1908, and after its success returned the next year, billed as "The Australian Entertainer". He later made several tours of both the U.S. and Australia, and introduced audiences there to the song "Show Me the Way to Go Home". His ability to update the content of his act ensured his career was both long and successful, lasting well into his eighties. In 1927, he appeared in the Royal Variety Performance, and for the 1931 performance teamed with the contrasting Billy Bennett in the cross-talking duo "Alexander and Mose".

His recording career spanned the first half of the 20th century, from "The Whistling Bowery Boy" on cylinder in 1905, to his final recordings on LP in 1960. He also had minor roles in a number of British films of the 1930s and 1940s.

Whelan was a member of the Grand Order of Water Rats and served as "King Rat" in 1948. He was the subject of This Is Your Life in 1957 when he was surprised by Eamonn Andrews at the BBC Television Theatre.

He was married three times and had three sons from his first marriage, including the actor Ronald Whelan and pianist Gordon Whelan. His second wife, Doris Chard, was an entertainer known as "Dainty Doris". He died in 1961 at the age of 85.

== Selected filmography ==
- An Intimate Interlude (1928) short film made in the sound-on-film Phonofilm process
- Matinee Idol (1933)
- Stars on Parade (1936)
- Action for Slander (1937)
- The Girl in the Taxi (1937)
- Stardust (1938)
- Danny Boy (1941)
