= Rob Burley =

English television producer

- Born: 1969 (age 56–57)
- Education: University of Nottingham
- Occupation: Television producer
- Employers: BBC (formerly); Global
- Notable work: The Andrew Marr Show; Politics Live; The Andrew Neil Show; Newscast; Newswatch; The Westminster Hour

Rob Burley (born 1969) is an English television producer, formerly the BBC's editor of live political programmes. He was the editor of The Andrew Marr Show, Politics Live, Newscast on television, Newswatch and The Westminster Hour.

== Early and personal life ==
Burley grew up in the 1970s and 1980s and was interested in politics from a young age. He obtained a degree in American studies from the University of Nottingham.

Burley lives in Brighton. He is a supporter of Liverpool F.C.

Burley contracted COVID-19 in March 2022.

== Career ==
He began his career as a researcher for the Labour Party member of Parliament Paul Flynn. He later worked at Granada Talk TV, leaving with a card from Sacha Baron-Cohen, the children's show presenter at the time, reading "Dear Rob, good luck baby, have fun and things, see you soon, Sacha." He joined ITV in 1996 and rose to become editor of its political shows The Sunday Edition and Jonathan Dimbleby. He also worked on Tonight, hosted by Trevor McDonald. He joined the BBC in 2008 and became executive editor of Question Time, deputy editor of Newsnight and assistant editor of BBC Breakfast. In 2018, he became the BBC's editor of live political programmes, succeeding Robbie Gibb. The role was based in Westminster and led Burley to take responsibility for the programmes Daily Politics, Sunday Politics, This Week, The Westminster Hour and Newswatch. When Daily Politics ended in 2018, Burley became editor of Politics Live, and later editor of The Andrew Neil Show and executive producer of the podcast Brexitcast on television.

The first episode of Politics Live generated criticism online because it featured a panel of five women. Burley said he had "zero shame" about the episode and that they had "invited people and they said yes and then we realised our best line-up was all female".

Following a November 2019 edition of Question Time, claims arose that a Brexit and Boris Johnson supporter in the show's audience was Burley's son. The fact-checking organisation Full Fact said that the false claim originated from a spoof Twitter account. The audience member's real identity was revealed to be a 19-year-old Conservative Party member, Layton J. Smith.

Brexitcast was renamed Newscast after the United Kingdom's exit from the European Union on 31 January 2020. The final edition of Brexitcast was released on 1 February 2020, with the first edition of Newscast airing on 6 February.

Burley's role of editor of live political programmes was closed by the BBC in 2021.

In 2021, HarperCollins secured Burley's book, Why is This Lying Bastard Lying to Me?, published in 2023. In it, he humorously describes his experiences with British politicians and focuses on 12 political interviews over a 25-year period. Brian and Margaret, a two-part television drama based on Burley's book, covering Brian Walden's 1989 interview of Margaret Thatcher, was commissioned in June 2024.

In 2022, Burley joined Global as executive editor of Andrew Marr's LBC programme Tonight with Andrew Marr.

== Bibliography ==
- Why Is This Lying Bastard Lying to Me?: 25 Years of Searching for the Truth on Political TV (HarperCollins, 2023) ISBN 978-0008542481
