= The Andrew Neil Show =

The Andrew Neil Show may refer to:

- The Andrew Neil Show (2019 TV programme)
- The Andrew Neil Show (2022 TV programme)
