= The Andrew Neil Show (2022 TV programme) =

2022 British television programme

- Genre: Politics
- Directed by: Martin Collett
- Presented by: Andrew Neil
- Country of origin: United Kingdom
- Original language: English

Production
- Producers: Wade Baverstock; Jet Cuthbertson; Scarlett Maguire
- Editor: John McAndrew
- Running time: 30 minutes (Series 1); 45 minutes (Series 2)

Original release
- Network: Channel 4
- Release: 8 May 2022 – 2 April 2023

Related
- The Andrew Neil Show (2019)

The Andrew Neil Show was a political programme presented by Andrew Neil. It was broadcast on Channel 4 on Sunday evenings for three series between 2022 and 2023.

== Background ==
Neil's BBC political programme The Andrew Neil Show came off-air during the COVID-19 pandemic on 11 March 2020 and was then cancelled as a result of budget cuts at the BBC. Following his departure from the BBC, Neil became founding chairman of GB News and a presenter on the channel, but resigned amid controversy in September 2021.

In January 2022, it was reported that Neil was in talks with Channel 4 about presenting a weekly politics show to be launched later in 2022. On 21 February, Channel 4 announced that Neil would host a show beginning in May, which would also be accompanied by a weekly podcast.

On 1 July 2023, Channel 4 announced that they axed The Andrew Neil Show amid content cuts.

== Format ==
The Andrew Neil Show aired at 6 pm on Sundays. The show was extended to 45 minutes on 25 September 2022, and George Osborne and Ed Balls became regular commentators.

== Episodes ==
=== Series 1 ===
No. overall	No. in series	Panel	Interviews	Original release date	Notes
1	1	Madeline Grant, Pippa Crerar	Jacob Rees-Mogg	8 May 2022	-
2	2	Madeline Grant, Pippa Crerar	Jonathan Ashworth	15 May 2022	-
3	3	George Osborne, Ed Balls	-	22 May 2022	-
4	4	Sonia Sodha, Sebastian Payne	Mick Lynch	29 May 2022	-
5	5	Madeline Grant, Stephen Bush	Paul Scully	5 June 2022	-
6	6	Madeline Grant, Stephen Bush	David Davis	12 June 2022	-
7	7	Madeline Grant, Stephen Bush	David Miliband	19 June 2022	-
8	8	Sonia Sodha, Jack Blanchard	Damian Green	26 June 2022	-
9	9	Madeline Grant, Stephen Bush	Stephen Kinnock, Matt Vickers	3 July 2022	-
10	10	Madeline Grant, Stephen Bush, Pippa Crerar, Noa Hoffman	Jacob Rees-Mogg, George Osborne	10 July 2022	Resignation of Boris Johnson
11	11	-	Rishi Sunak	29 July 2022	Conservative Party leadership election

=== Series 2 ===
No. overall	No. in series	Panel	Interviews	Original release date	Notes
12	1	George Osborne, Ed Balls, Stephen Bush, Madeline Grant	Wes Streeting, Christina McAnea	25 September 2022	Labour Party Conference
13	2	George Osborne, Ed Balls, Kate Andrews, Stephen Bush	Jake Berry	2 October 2022	Conservative Party Conference
14	3	George Osborne, Ed Balls, Madeline Grant, Sonia Sodha	Johnny Mercer, Jonathan Ashworth	9 October 2022	-
15	4	George Osborne, Ed Balls, Madeline Grant, Jasmine Cameron-Chileshe	Matt Hancock, Crispin Blunt	16 October 2022	-
16	5	George Osborne, Ed Balls, Katy Balls, Stephen Bush	Andrew Mitchell, Paul Bristow, Bob Seely	23 October 2022	Conservative Party leadership election
17	6	George Osborne, Ed Balls, Noa Hoffman, Sonia Sodha	Nina Skero, Steve Reed	30 October 2022	-
18	7	George Osborne, Ed Balls, Sebastian Payne, Sonia Sodha	Gary Smith, Richard Holden	6 November 2022	-
19	8	George Osborne, Ed Balls, Jasmine Cameron-Chileshe, Jack Blanchard	Alex Chalk, Anne Boden, Martin Sorrell	13 November 2022	-
20	9	George Osborne, Ed Balls, Pippa Crerar, Mehreen Khan	Will Quince	20 November 2022	-
21	10	George Osborne, Ed Balls	Mark Harper, Lisa Nandy	27 November 2022	-

=== Series 3 ===
No. overall	No. in series	Panel	Interviews	Original release date	Notes
22	1	George Osborne, Ed Balls, Madeline Grant, Sonia Sodha	David Davis, Michael Heseltine, Andy Burnham	29 January 2023	-
23	2	George Osborne, Ed Balls, Charlotte Ivers, Stephen Bush	Grant Shapps, Gina Miller	5 February 2023	-
24	3	George Osborne, Ed Balls, Katy Balls, Jasmine Cameron-Chileshe	Andrew Mitchell, David Baddiel	12 February 2023	-
25	4	George Osborne, Ed Balls, Noa Hoffman, Stephen Bush	Anas Sarwar, Alex Salmond, Mervyn King	19 February 2023	-
26	5	George Osborne, Ed Balls, Ailbhe Rea, Sonia Sodha	Dominic Raab, Bertie Ahern	26 February 2023	-
27	6	George Osborne, Ed Balls, Pippa Crerar, Katy Balls	Robert Buckland, Jonathan Ashworth	5 March 2023	-
28	7	George Osborne, Ed Balls, Mehreen Khan, Stephen Bush	Victoria Atkins, Brian Cox	12 March 2023	-
29	8	George Osborne, Ed Balls, Madeline Grant, Jasmine Cameron-Chileshe	Lisa Nandy	19 March 2023	-
30	9	George Osborne, Ed Balls	Michael Gove	26 March 2023	-
31	10	George Osborne, Ed Balls	Sarah Dines, Steve Reed	2 April 2023	-

== Reception ==
The Telegraph said of the inaugural episode: "It made for a middling half hour of chat, chuckles and cheeky jokes."
