= Katy Balls =

British journalist (born 1989)

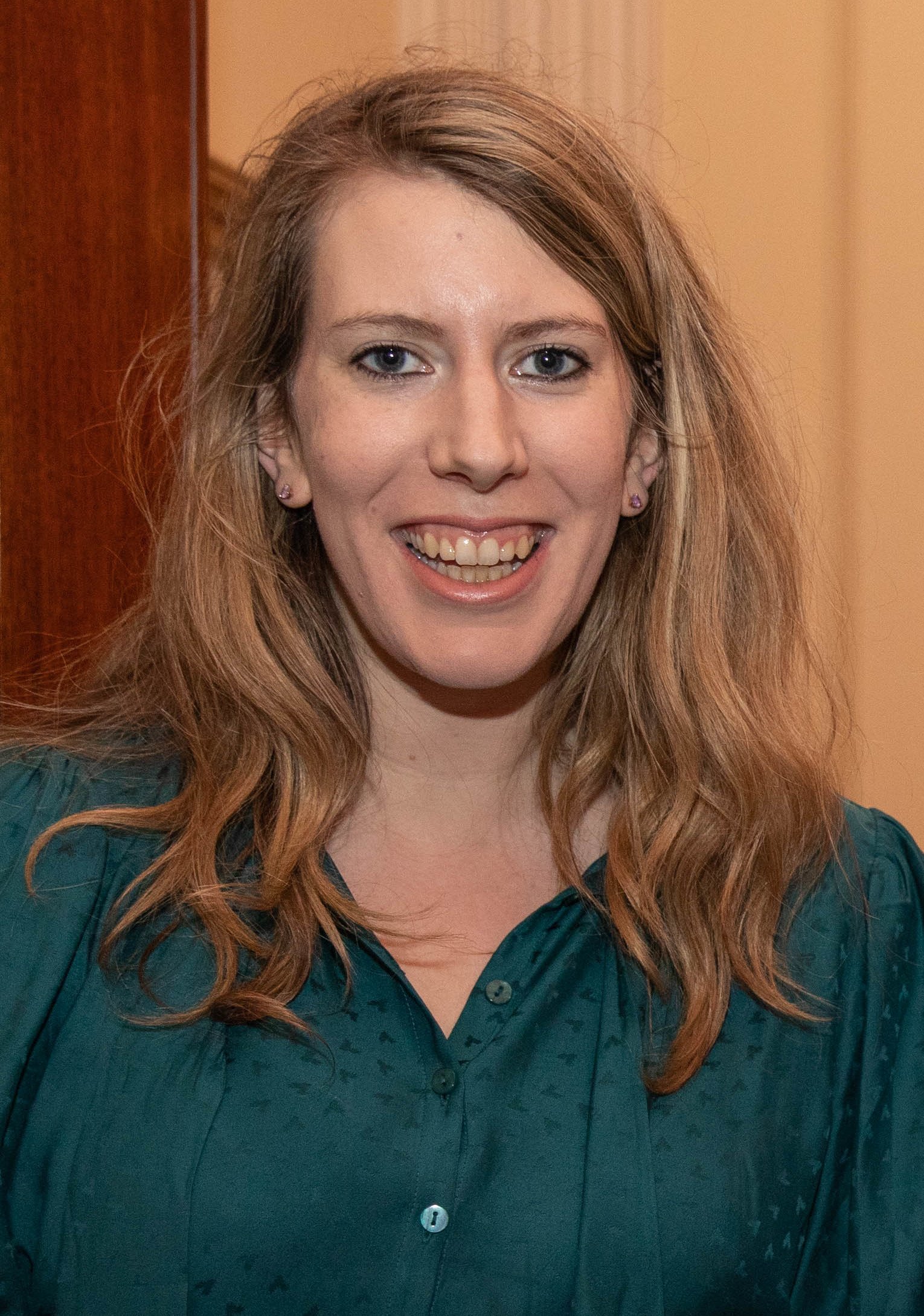
- Balls in 2020
- Born: 12 February 1989 (age 37); Aberdeen, Scotland
- Education: University of Durham
- Occupation: Journalist
- Years active: 2013–present
- Employer: The Times

Kathryn Balls (born 12 February 1989) is a British journalist. She is Washington editor for The Times having previously been political editor of The Spectator.

== Early life ==
Born in Aberdeen, Balls grew up in North Berwick and attended North Berwick High School. She studied at the University of Durham, where she wrote for the university paper Palatinate on travel and music. She graduated from Durham with a 2:1 degree in Philosophy in 2010.

== Career ==
Balls' media career began at The Daily Telegraph with the Mandrake column. She was the diary editor at The Spectator, becoming their political correspondent in December 2016 and was promoted to deputy political editor in January 2019, rising to political editor in January 2023. She was also a regular contributor of columns to The Guardian and Tatler.

Balls wrote a fortnightly column on Westminster politics for the i (newspaper). Her column was nominated for Political Commentary of the Year at the 2017 Press Awards. She hosts a podcast entitled Women With Balls. Balls has made several television appearances, including The Bolt Report, Good Morning Britain, Sky News, Politics Live, The Andrew Marr Show, Question Time and Have I Got News for You.

On 21 February 2025, Balls joined The Times and The Sunday Times becoming their Washington editor and columnist. She has been a studio guest on GB News's The Late Show Live, broadcast to the UK, from Washington.

== Personal life ==
Balls is married to Max Bye, son of Ruby Wax and Ed Bye.

Media offices
Preceded by James Forsyth	Political Editor of The Spectator; 2023–2025	Vacant
