= Aasmah Mir =

Scottish broadcaster and journalist

- Born: Aasmah Saira Mir; 7 October 1971 (age 54); Glasgow, Scotland
- Occupations: Broadcaster, journalist
- Years active: 1995–present
- Spouse: Piara Powar (2007–2021)
- Children: 1
- Website: aasmahmir.com

Aasmah Saira Mir (/ˈæzmə ˈmɪər/, born 7 October 1971) is a Scottish television and radio broadcaster and journalist. She co-presented the Monday-Thursday breakfast programme on Times Radio from 2020 to 2025.

== Early life and education ==
Mir was born in Glasgow to first-generation Pakistani immigrants, father Arif Mir and mother Almas, from Raiwind on 7 October 1971 and brought up from the age of ten in the affluent suburb of Bearsden, where she attended Bearsden Academy. She graduated from the University of Bristol with an honours law degree in 1993.

== Career ==
=== Journalism ===
In 1995, Mir had a brief stint as a reporter for the Daily Record and Sunday Mail, then became a radio researcher. In 2005 and 2006 she was a columnist for the Sunday Herald.

=== Television ===
Mir, whose sister Uzma was already working for BBC Scotland, first appeared in an episode of a 1992 BBC Scotland show called The Insiders presented by Gordon Kennedy. After graduation she joined Scottish Television aged 21 as a trainee and read the early morning news bulletins and later presented the main news show.

She presented a couple of editions of an Asian documentary strand for BBC Two called East in 1996 and some items on Desi DNA. In 1998 she became a reporter for Central Television in Nottingham.

Mir also presented episodes Just Write on Channel 4 and Around Scotland on BBC Two. In 2010 she was a newspaper reviewer on GMTV with Lorraine and Lorraine.

=== Radio ===
In 1999 Mir moved to London as a producer for BBC Radio London and started doing freelance news-reading shifts for the national radio station BBC Radio 5 Live. She joined the station full-time in July 2001.

In April 2006 she covered the weekday morning phone-in programme on BBC Asian Network for a fortnight between Sonia Deol leaving and Anita Rani becoming presenter. She has presented items on the BBC Asian Network Report.

Mir presented the Midday News on 5 Live, Monday to Friday, until 9 January 2009. In 2009 she presented some Friday editions of Good Morning Scotland. Also in 2009 she presented a series of programmes for BBC Radio 4 on Scotland's Year of Homecoming, as well as Colour Me White for Radio 4, and Gay Life After Saddam for Radio 5 Live. In 2010 she replaced Anita Anand as a presenter of Radio 5 Live's Drive programme. For one week in March 2012 she sat in for Jeremy Vine on his BBC Radio 2 programme.

On 27 September 2012 Mir announced on Twitter she was leaving BBC 5 Live after 11 years with the station. Mir presented her last 5 Live Drive on 9 November 2012. On 29 October 2012 Mir presented an edition of BBC Radio 4's Woman's Hour and for a while replaced Julia Hartley-Brewer on the LBC 97.3 afternoon programme.

From 2012 to 2020 she was a copresenter of BBC Radio 4's Saturday Live.

In April 2020 she was announced as a presenter for Times Radio when the station launched on 29 June 2020. She was to co-present Monday to Thursday breakfast with Stig Abell. In November 2024 she announced she was to leave Times Radio Breakfast in two months and presented her last show on 30th January 2025.

For several weeks in 2025 and 2026, Mir has stood in for Shelagh Fogarty as presenter of the weekday 1pm to 4pm slot on LBC.

== Memoir ==
In 2023, she released her memoir A Pebble in the Throat.

== Personal life ==
Mir was married to Piara Powar, the executive director of Football Against Racism in Europe. She gave birth to a daughter at the age of 43. In 2021 Mir divorced Powar, stating that "this was my decision so I cannot wallow for too long".

Mir is a fan of Celtic F.C.
