= Kate Andrews =

American journalist (born 1990)

- Born: 24 June 1990 (age 36)
- Education: Greens Farms Academy; University of St Andrews
- Occupations: Journalist; Columnist
- Known for: Economics editor, The Spectator

Kate Andrews (born 24 June 1990) is an American journalist based in the United Kingdom who focuses on economics issues. She has been the economics editor of The Spectator since 2021 and also writes a weekly column for The Daily Telegraph. She previously wrote a fortnightly column for City AM. Currently she is an opinion journalist for The Washington Post.

== Early life ==
Andrews was educated at Greens Farms Academy in Westport, Connecticut before moving to Scotland in 2008 to study at the University of St Andrews where she graduated in 2012 with a MA in International Relations and Philosophy. At St Andrews, she was a part of the university's performing arts society and served as the rector's assessor during Alistair Moffat's term as Rector.

== Career ==
After university, Andrews had brief stints working for the presidential campaign team for Mitt Romney, the senate campaign team for Linda McMahon, and for the American conservative news website, Townhall. In 2014, she returned to the United Kingdom to work for the neoliberal think tank, the Adam Smith Institute. She then moved to the free market think tank, the Institute of Economic Affairs, to take up the position of news editor. In 2018, she was included in LBC's list of the 100 most influential conservatives in the UK.

In 2020, she joined The Spectator as a journalist covering economics-related issues and became the publication's economics editor in 2021. She has twice been shortlisted for 'Business and finance Journalist of the year' by The Press Awards for her work in trend-analysis, most notably predicting the surge in inflation which faced the UK after the COVID-19 pandemic.

She is a frequent panelist on the BBC's Politics Live and Question Time, and also makes regular media appearances on other broadcasters, including Sky News, Channel 4, Channel 5 and ITV.

== Political views ==
A self-identified lifelong Republican, Andrews voted for Joe Biden in 2020 in protest against Donald Trump, having previously voted for the Libertarian candidate in 2016. She is a free-speech advocate, holds favourable views towards immigration and has previously spoken out against gun control measures which widened background checks on potential gun buyers.

Andrews has regularly advocated for a reform in how the National Health Service is funded. She does not believe that the funding model of the healthcare system in the United States should be replicated in the UK, but supports examining the healthcare systems of other countries which maintain the principles of universal access and free at the point of delivery.
