= Rae Stewart =

Scottish journalist (1967–2023)

Rae Graeme Andersen Stewart (19 January 1967 – 20 June 2023) was a Scottish journalist.

== Early life and education ==
Born in Tain, Ross-shire, Stewart attended Tain Royal Academy and later studied communication at Napier College, Edinburgh.

== Career ==
Stewart began his career with the Scottish Conservative Party before becoming Scotland correspondent for GMTV in 1995. He subsequently moved to London, holding positions as programme producer, political correspondent, general reporter, and senior news editor. In 2000, Stewart became Westminster correspondent for STV. During his journalism career, he reported extensively on politics, including coverage related to the inquiry into the Iraq War.

In 2009, Stewart began advising government departments and serving as press secretary to Deputy Prime Minister Nick Clegg (2010–2015). Later, he was director of corporate affairs at Water UK and founded the consultancy Ashburn Fleming in 2020, also serving briefly with NHS Test and Trace during the COVID-19 pandemic.

== Writing ==
Stewart authored two novels: The Vibe (2017), set in Goa, India, and Smoke on the Water (2023), set in the Scottish Highlands.

== Personal life ==
Stewart was married to BBC political correspondent Vicki Young, with whom he had two children. Stewart publicly disclosed his own experience with testicular cancer, initially diagnosed in 1993. He died from cancer in June 2023, aged 56.
