= Times Radio =

British digital radio station owned by News UK

- London; England
- Broadcast area: United Kingdom
- Frequency: DAB: 11A Sound Digital

Programming
- Language: English
- Format: News/current affairs

Ownership
- Owner: News UK Broadcasting Ltd; (News UK)
- Sister stations: Talk; Talksport; Talksport 2; Virgin Radio UK; Virgin Radio 80s; Virgin Radio Anthems; Virgin Radio Britpop; Virgin Radio Chilled; Virgin Radio Legends; Virgin Radio Pride

History
- First air date: 29 June 2020

Technical information
- Licensing authority: Ofcom

Links
- Webcast: Radio player
- Website: times.radio

Times Radio is a British digital radio station owned by News UK, part of the Murdoch media empire. It is jointly operated by News Broadcasting (which News UK acquired in 2016, when it was known as Wireless Group), The Times and The Sunday Times.

As of March 2026, the station has a reach of 604,000, according to RAJAR.

== History ==
The launch of Times Radio was first announced on 28 January 2020. Unusually for a commercial radio station, it was conceived with the specific purpose of increasing take-up of the digital subscription package for The Times and The Sunday Times newspapers. The focus of the station was outlined in a webcast on 18 May 2020, where the tone was described as "measured, well-informed and non-adversarial". The station announced its full schedule on 2 June, and launched at 6 am on 29 June.

On its first day on air, the station broadcast interviews with Prime Minister Boris Johnson, former Chancellors George Osborne and Alistair Darling, actress Rose McGowan and the author Margaret Atwood.

On 15 October 2020, the first TV advertisement for the station was launched in the UK; it featured presenters John Pienaar, Giles Coren, Aasmah Mir, Matt Chorley, Michael Portillo, Mariella Frostrup and Stig Abell.

Gloria De Piero left the station in May 2021 to present a weekday afternoon show on GB News. Her Friday morning slot was replaced by Matt Chorley's programme, which became a Monday to Friday show.

In May 2024 it was announced that Matt Chorley would be leaving Times Radio to take up a new job at BBC Radio 5 Live presenting a daily politics show. Following the calling of the 2024 United Kingdom general election, it was announced that Andrew Neil's hiring would be brought forward in order to provide daily election coverage, analysis, commentary, interviews and debates. Neil's first Times Radio show was broadcast on 3 June.

In June and July 2026, Times Radio partnered with Boom Radio, a station playing music from the 1960s and 1970s, for a six-week promotion deal, whereby both stations would make listeners aware of the other through on-air announcements.

In 2026 Times Radio started a 24 hour live stream on YouTube (https://www.youtube.com/live/3EaWrWqt7dk?is=sI0SIklVbx233SOz)

== Format ==
Times Radio consists mostly of live three-hour blocks fronted by a single presenter, except for the four-hour breakfast show with two presenters, (on weekdays) a one-hour "early breakfast" at 5 am and an hour-long 'Times Radio at One' slot with a guest presenter, hosted at 1pm. With the exception of early breakfast, the presenting line-up on Fridays is entirely separate from the Monday–Thursday schedule, with the weekend schedule also being distinct in its programming. Overnight hours are filled with a combination of highlights from the day's output and The Times's own podcasts. At weekends at 7 pm there are also original pre-recorded features.

There are news bulletins on the hour and summaries on the half-hour. The half-hourly summary is followed by a sports bulletin provided by Times Radio's sister station Talksport. The format accommodates live coverage of major political statements or statements from the House of Commons when required.

The content of the station builds to a large extent on the content of The Times and The Sunday Times newspapers. Discussion is mainly studio-based, although there are occasional outside reports when resources allow. The station does not generally use pre-recorded "packages" as heard on the BBC and elsewhere. Nor does it carry phone-ins, though listeners are invited to submit comments via text message, email and social media.

The station was originally free of spot advertising, which was introduced in February 2022. Certain programmes are sponsored; the first programme to gain a sponsorship deal was Giles Coren's Friday lunchtime show, which was sponsored by Fortnum and Mason. The station also raises revenue by generating subscriptions to The Times and The Sunday Times online. There are frequent announcements encouraging listeners to take out a subscription, especially after items directly related to a newspaper article.

Presenters are at times changed when a major news story breaks, as when the death of Prince Philip, Duke of Edinburgh was announced, which happened shortly before Giles Coren's programme was due to air and led to the show being cancelled in favour of a live programme covering the death, initially hosted by Cathy Newman and Stig Abell.

== Broadcasting platforms ==
Times Radio is available in the UK on DAB digital radio and worldwide via a free app on iOS or Android or via an internet stream, via the newspaper's own website, and on some smart speakers. Programmes are available for seven days after broadcast either via the app or via the website. Times Radio is available on Sky in the UK only on channel 0142. It launched on Sky on 1 July 2026.

== Studios ==
Times Radio primarily broadcasts from a dedicated studio complex within The News Building in Central London, which is the headquarters of its ultimate owner News UK. It broadcasts from the 14th floor.

== Critical reception ==
The station gained some unexpected publicity on its launch day when some listeners on smart speakers were directed to a similarly named radio network in Malawi operated by The Daily Times. A phone call to the Malawian network was featured on the following morning's breakfast programme. On the station's launch day, Mark Lawson wrote in The Guardian that "on the early evidence, Times Radio most resembled a good-quality karaoke BBC Radio 5 Live."

Writing in The Observer after the first week's broadcasting, Miranda Sawyer said: "Pre-launch, there was much speculation that Times Radio would be a rival to Radio 4. But aside from news shows, Radio 4 is structured around many non-live 'built' programmes: documentaries, drama, panel shows with audiences. For the moment, Times Radio doesn't have the resources to create these, and aside from a couple of pre-recorded phone interviews, everything on air is going out live. It's less Radio 4, more a light version of Radio 5 Live. 5 Lite."

== Presenters ==
=== Current ===
- Stig Abell
- Kait Borsay
- Adam Boulton
- Jo Coburn
- Alexis Conran
- Jane Garvey
- Fi Glover
- Ayesha Hazarika
- Kate McCann
- Darryl Morris
- Andrew Neil
- Cathy Newman
- John Pienaar
- Hugo Rifkind
- Stephen Sackur
- Chloe Tilley
- Ryan Tubridy
- Carole Walker
- Rosie Wright
- Callum MacDonald

=== Former ===
- Matt Chorley
- Giles Coren
- Ruth Davidson
- Gloria De Piero
- Mariella Frostrup
- Jenny Kleeman
- Aasmah Mir
- Rod Liddle
- Tom Newton Dunn
- Michael Portillo
- Rachel Sylvester
- Alice Thomson
- Phil Williams
- Luke Jones
