= Andrea Catherwood =

Northern Irish television presenter and journalist

- Born: Andrea Catherine Catherwood; 27 November 1967 (age 58); Belfast, Northern Ireland
- Occupations: Television presenter, journalist
- Spouse: Graham Smith (m. 2002)
- Children: 3
- Website: andreacatherwood.com

Andrea Catherine Catherwood (born 27 November 1967) is a Northern Irish television presenter and journalist.

== Early life ==
Andrea Catherwood was born and raised in Belfast where her mother, Adrienne McGuill, was an announcer and newsreader at Ulster Television, from 1959 to 1969, and also presented The Romper Room from 1964 to 1969 as Miss Adrienne. Adrienne Catherwood was appointed an MBE in 2004 for her work with the charity Action Medical Research. Andrea was educated at Strathearn School in Belmont in the east of Belfast. Her broadcasting career began aged 16 when she joined BBC Northern Ireland in Belfast as a co-presenter of a youth current affairs programme, for which she won BBC Northern Ireland's 'Young Presenter of the Year' award. The following year she co-presented the youth current affairs programme Up Front. Aged 18, Catherwood made a documentary for BBC Radio 4 about the then 18 years of the Troubles in Northern Ireland.

== Journalism career ==
Following an honours degree in law from the University of Manchester, in 1990 Catherwood joined Ulster Television, where she spent three years as a news and features reporter. In 1993, she joined NBC Asia in the Colony of Hong Kong as a news reporter, covering the handover of Hong Kong to China and the 1997 stock-market turmoil. She travelled extensively throughout Asia, and in Burma interviewed opposition leader Aung San Suu Kyi.

She joined ITN in April 1998 starting as newscaster and senior reporter for ITV News, presenting the ITV Morning News and providing special reports for News at Ten. She then became medical correspondent for ITV News. Having joined Five News in 2000 as a main news presenter, she moved back to ITV in 2001.

In November 2001 she was the first British journalist into Mazar-i-Sharif after the Northern Alliance captured the city from Taliban forces. She produced a number of reports, which received wide coverage in the British press. Catherwood was reporting from inside the prison at the beginning of the Taliban prisoners uprising when one exploded a concealed grenade that killed five people. Catherwood was injured in the knee by shrapnel.

In 2003, she was promoted and made the main anchor of the ITV Weekend News, plus a relief presenter on the ITV Lunchtime News and ITV Evening News.

Catherwood left ITV News in September 2006, to front The Sunday Edition, ITV's new political show with Andrew Rawnsley. However, this was quietly dropped in November 2007.

In 2006, she was scheduled to appear on the celebrity special of The X Factor: Battle of the Stars and to sing with James Hewitt but ITV management refused to give her permission to appear on the show. In 2007, she was a contestant on the ITV series Vernon Kay's Gameshow Marathon.

In July 2009, to coincide with the 40th anniversary of the NASA Moon landings, ITN produced five special 10-minute programmes for ITV titled Mission to the Moon – News from 1969. Catherwood, a former ITN newscaster and correspondent, reported for these specials. The first aired at 22:35 on ITV on Wednesday 15 July and ran the following Thursday, Friday, Sunday and Monday.

In October 2009 Catherwood joined Bloomberg Television as part of the news station's relaunch, where she anchored Briefing, The Pulse, and Last Word. She left in March 2012.

Catherwood is now a weekly contributor to This Morning on ITV, as well as writing for The Mail on Sunday.

Over the past three years she has been a presenter on various Radio 4 programmes. She presented BBC Radio 4's Woman's Hour, as well as You and Yours, and is a regular stand-in presenter of The Media Show on Radio 4. In September 2017, she appeared on the BBC Radio 4 programme Great Lives, nominating Constance Markievicz for a great life. As of December 2020 she still presented Woman's Hour occasionally; however her future participation was uncertain.

In October 2022, Catherwood began presenting Feedback on BBC Radio 4; the programme holds the BBC to account by allowing the radio listeners to express their opinions.

== Personal life ==
Catherwood married lawyer Graham Smith on 3 July 2002 at a private family ceremony in Kenmare, in the south-west of Ireland. The couple have three children.
