= Truro High School =

Truro High School for Girls
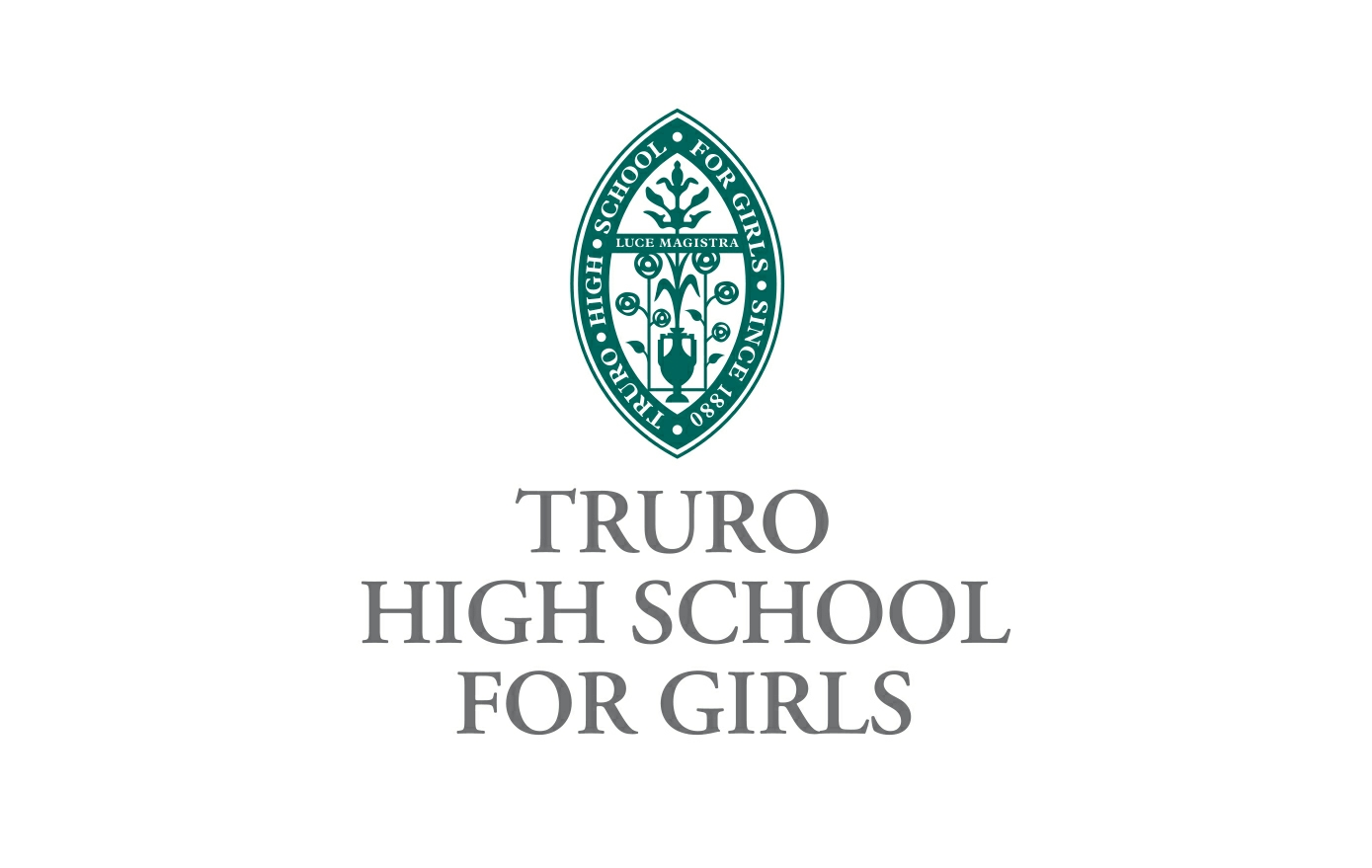

Location
- Falmouth Road; Truro, Cornwall, TR1 2HU; England
- Coordinates: 50.25705°N 5.05643°W

Information
- Type: Private day and boarding
- Motto: Luce Magistra
- Religious affiliation: Church of England
- Established: 1880
- Founder: Edward White Benson, Bishop of Truro
- Local authority: Cornwall
- Chair of Governors: John Keast
- Headmistress: Sarah Matthews
- Staff: 80
- Gender: Girls
- Age: 3 to 18
- Enrolment: 340
- Colour
- Website: https://www.trurohigh.co.uk

Truro High School for Girls is a private day and boarding school for girls in Truro, Cornwall. The school consists of a girls-only prep school, senior school and sixth form. It is a member of the Girls' Schools Association.

== History ==
The school was founded in 1880 by the future archbishop Edward White Benson, then Bishop of Truro. As well as establishing Truro High School, Benson also oversaw the building of Truro Cathedral before moving on to become Archbishop of Canterbury.

The school was started as an all-girls school with just seven pupils and moved to its present site in 1896. By the 1950s, pupil numbers were up to almost 500. During the early 1970s it was a direct grant grammar school before becoming independent when the tripartite system was abolished in 1976. Both boys and girls were in both its nursery and sixth Form at various stages in its development.

Its first headmistress was Amy Key, well known as the writer Mrs. Henry Clarke. A history of the school was written by her daughter Amy Key Clarke.

Over the last 20 years, the school has subsumed the previous Daniel Girls' Secondary School site to provide the Daniel Road campus which houses English, art, drama, modern foreign languages Departments as well as the performing arts studio and studio theatre.

== Notable former pupils ==
- Morwenna Banks, comedian
- Vicki Young (b. 1970), political journalist
- Barbara West (1911–2007), second-to-last remaining survivor the Titanic sinking
- Lilian Knowles (1870-1926), professor of economic history at LSE and Britain's second professor of the subject
