= Andrew Neil =

Scottish journalist and broadcaster (born 1949)

Andrew Neil FRSA
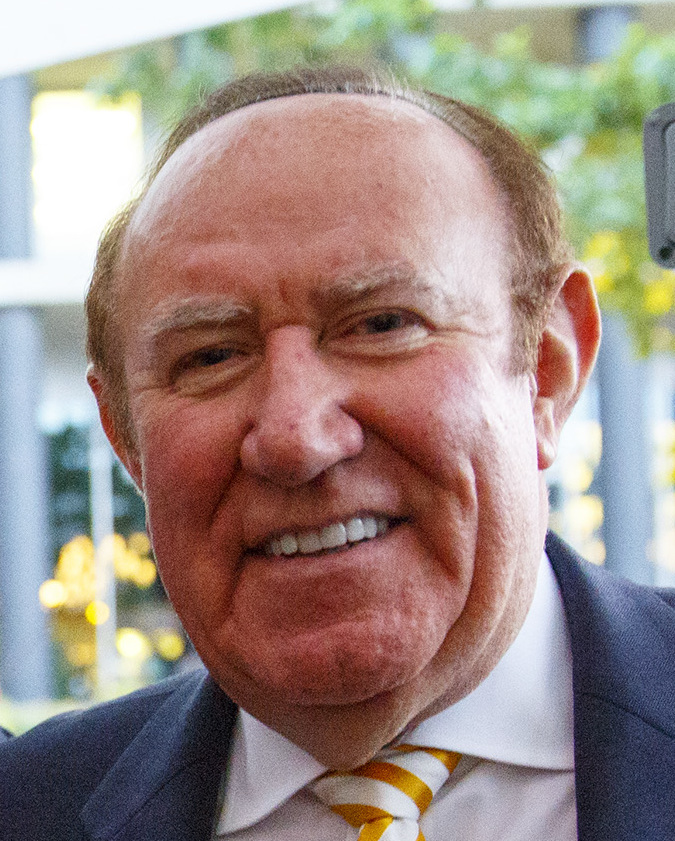
- Neil in 2016
- Born: Andrew Ferguson Neil; 21 May 1949 (age 77); Paisley, Renfrewshire, Scotland
- Education: University of Glasgow (MA)
- Occupations: Journalist; broadcaster
- Notable credits: This Week (2003–2019); Daily Politics (2003–2018); Sunday Politics (2012–2017); The Economist; The Spectator; Apollo magazine; Politics Live (2018–2020); The Andrew Neil Show on BBC (2019–2020); The Andrew Neil Show on Channel 4 (2022–2023)
- Spouse: Susan Nilsson (m. 2015)

Lord Rector of the University of St Andrews
- In office November 1999 – October 2002
- Preceded by: Donald Findlay
- Succeeded by: Sir Clement Freud

Andrew Ferguson Neil FRSA (born 21 May 1949) is a Scottish journalist and broadcaster. He has presented various political programmes on the BBC and on Channel 4. Born in Paisley, Renfrewshire, Neil attended Paisley Grammar School, before studying at the University of Glasgow. He entered journalism in 1973 as a correspondent for The Economist.

Neil was appointed editor of The Sunday Times by Rupert Murdoch in 1983, and held this position until 1994. After that, he became a contributor to the Daily Mail. He was chief executive and editor-in-chief of Press Holdings Media Group. In 1988, he became founding chairman of Sky TV, also part of Murdoch's News Corporation. He worked for the BBC for 25 years until 2020, fronting various programmes, including Sunday Politics and This Week on BBC One and Daily Politics, Politics Live and The Andrew Neil Show on BBC Two. From 2008 until 2024 he was the chairman of Press Holdings, whose titles include The Spectator, and ITP Media Group. Following his departure from the BBC, he became founding chairman of GB News and a presenter on the channel, but resigned in September 2021. He joined Channel 4, as presenter of The Andrew Neil Show, between 2022 and 2023, the show shared the same name as his former BBC Two programme. In June 2024 he began hosting a daily broadcast for Times Radio providing political analysis, commentary, interviews and debates.

== Early life ==
Neil was born on 21 May 1949 in Paisley, Renfrewshire, to Mary and James Neil. His mother worked in cotton mills during World War II and his father ran the wartime Cairo fire brigade, worked as an electrician and was a major in the Territorial Army in Renfrewshire. He grew up in the Glenburn area and attended the local Langcraigs Primary School. At 11, Neil passed the qualifying examination and obtained entrance to the selective Paisley Grammar School.

After school, Neil attended the University of Glasgow, where he edited the student newspaper, the Glasgow University Guardian, and dabbled in student television. He was a member of the Dialectic Society and the Conservative Club, and participated in Glasgow University Union inter-varsity debates. In 1971, he was chairman of the Federation of Conservative Students. He graduated in 1971, with an MA with honours in political economy and political science. He had been tutored by Vince Cable and had a focus on American history.

== Press career ==
After his graduation, Neil briefly worked as a sports correspondent for a local newspaper, the Paisley Daily Express, before working for the Conservative Party. In 1973, he joined The Economist as a correspondent and was later promoted as editor of the publication's section on Britain.

=== The Sunday Times ===
Neil was editor of The Sunday Times from 1983 to 1994. His hiring was controversial: it was argued he was appointed by Rupert Murdoch over more experienced colleagues, such as Hugo Young and Brian MacArthur.

Neil told Murdoch before he was appointed editor that The Sunday Times was intellectually stuck in a 1960s time warp and that it needed to "shake off its collectivist mind-set to become the champion of a market-led revolution that would shake the British Establishment to its bones and transform the economy and society". Neil later said that although he shared some of Murdoch's right-wing views, "on many matters Rupert was well to the right of me politically. He was a monetarist. I was not. Nor did I share his conservative social outlook".

In his first editorial, on 9 October 1983, Neil advised Margaret Thatcher's government to "move to the right on industrial policy (trust-bust, deregulate, privatise wherever it produces more competition and efficiency) and centre-left in economic strategy (a few billion extra in capital spending would have little impact on interest rates or inflation but could give a lift to a shaky economic recovery)".

The Sunday Times strongly supported the stationing of American cruise missiles in bases in Britain after the Soviet Union installed SS-20s in Eastern Europe, and it criticised the resurgent Campaign for Nuclear Disarmament. Neil also wrote editorials supporting the United States invasion of Grenada because it would restore democracy there, despite opposition from Hugo Young. Neil replied to Young that he wanted the editorial stance of The Sunday Times to be "neo-Keynesian in economic policy, radical right in industrial policy, liberal on social matters and European and Atlanticist on foreign policy".

In Neil's first year as the paper's editor, The Sunday Times had revealed the date of the deployment of cruise missiles, exposed how Mark Thatcher had channelled the gains from his consultancy business into a bank account and reported on Robert Mugabe's atrocities in Matabeleland. Neil also printed extracts from Germaine Greer's Sex and Destiny and from Francis Pym's anti-Thatcher autobiography, as well as a study of the "Patels of Britain", a celebration of the success of Britain's Asian community.

Neil has said his greatest scoop as an editor was the newspaper's revelation of details of Israel's nuclear weapons programme in 1986, by using photographs and testimony from former Israeli nuclear technician Mordechai Vanunu. During his editorship, the newspaper lost a libel case over claims that it had made concerning a witness, Carmen Proetta, who was interviewed after her appearance in the Death on the Rock documentary on the Gibraltar shootings. One of The Sunday Times journalists involved, Rosie Waterhouse, resigned not long afterwards.

On 20 July 1986, The Sunday Times printed a front-page article (titled 'Queen dismayed by "uncaring" Thatcher') alleging that the Queen believed that Margaret Thatcher's policies were "uncaring, confrontational and socially divisive". The main source of information was the Queen's press secretary, Michael Shea. When Buckingham Palace issued a statement rebutting the story, Neil was so angry at what he considered to be the Palace's double-dealing that he refused to print the statement in later editions of The Sunday Times.

In 1987, the Labour-controlled Strathclyde Regional Authority wanted to close down Neil's old school, Paisley Grammar School. After finding the secretary of state for Scotland, Malcolm Rifkind, indifferent to the school's future, Neil contacted Margaret Thatcher's policy adviser, Brian Griffiths, to try and save the school. When Griffiths informed Thatcher of Strathclyde's plan to close it she issued a new regulation that gave the Scottish secretary the power to save schools where 80 per cent of the parents were opposed to the local authority's closure plan, thereby saving Paisley Grammar.

While at The Sunday Times in 1988, Neil met the former Miss India, Pamella Bordes, in a nightclub, an inappropriate place for someone with Neil's job according to Peregrine Worsthorne. The News of the World suggested Bordes was a call girl. Worsthorne argued in an editorial article "Playboys as Editors" in March 1989 for The Sunday Telegraph that Neil was not fit to edit a serious Sunday newspaper. Worsthorne effectively accused Neil of knowing that Bordes was a prostitute. He apparently did not know about Bordes, which the Telegraph had accepted by the time the libel case came to High Court of Justice in January 1990, but the paper still defended their coverage as fair comment. Neil won the case and was awarded £1,000 in damages, and his costs.

In a July 1988 editorial ("Morals for the majority") Neil said that in Britain there were emerging pockets of social decay and unsocial behaviour: "a social rot ... has gone deeper than the industrial decay of the 1960s and 1970s". Having been impressed with Charles Murray's study of the American welfare state, Losing Ground, Neil invited Murray to Britain in 1989 to study Britain's emerging underclass. The Sunday Times Magazine of 26 November 1989 was largely devoted to Murray's report, which found that the British underclass consisted of people existing on welfare, the black economy and crime, with illegitimacy being the single most reliable predictor. The accompanying editorial said Britain was in the midst of a "social tragedy of Dickensian proportions", with an underclass "characterized by drugs, casual violence, petty crime, illegitimate children, homelessness, work avoidance and contempt for conventional values".

Under Neil's editorship, The Sunday Times opposed the poll tax. In his memoirs, Neil said that his opposition to the poll tax crystallised when he discovered that his cleaner would be paying more poll tax than himself at a time when his income tax had just been reduced to 40% from 60%. During the 1990 Conservative Party leadership election, The Sunday Times was the only Murdoch-owned newspaper to support Michael Heseltine against Thatcher. Neil blamed Thatcher for high inflation, "misplaced chauvinism" over Europe, and the poll tax, concluding that she had become an "electoral liability" and must therefore be replaced by Heseltine.

In an editorial of January 1988 ("Modernize the monarchy"), Neil advocated the abolition of both the preference for males in the law of succession and of the exclusion of Catholics from the throne. Subsequent editorials of The Sunday Times called for the Queen to pay income tax and advocated a scaled-down monarchy that would not be class-based but which would be "an institution with close links to all classes. That meant clearing out the old-school courtiers ... and creating a court which was far more representative of the multi-racial meritocracy that Britain was becoming". In an editorial of February 1991 Neil criticised some minor members of the Royal Family for their behaviour while the country was at war in the Gulf. In 1992 Neil obtained for The Sunday Times the serialisation rights for Andrew Morton's book Diana: Her True Story, which revealed the breakdown of Princess Diana's marriage as well as her bulimia and her suicide attempts.

In 1992 Neil was criticised by anti-Nazi groups and historians including Hugh Trevor-Roper for employing the Holocaust denier David Irving to translate the diaries of Joseph Goebbels.

=== End of the Murdoch connection ===
According to Neil, he was replaced as Sunday Times editor in 1994 because Murdoch had become envious of his celebrity. Many years later, in November 2017, former Conservative cabinet minister Kenneth Clarke said Neil had been removed because Neil's article about corruption in the Malaysian government of Mahathir Mohamad conflicted with Murdoch's desire to acquire a television franchise in the country. The Malaysian prime minister at the time told Clarke on a ministerial visit that he had achieved Neil's sacking after a telephone conversation with Murdoch. The conflict between Neil and Mahathir did become public knowledge at the time. The British minister of state for trade Richard Needham criticised Neil and the newspaper for potentially putting thousands of jobs at risk.

Neil's departure from his role as Sunday Times editor was officially reported in 1994 as being merely temporary, as he was to present and edit a current affairs programme for Fox in New York. "During my time, the Sunday Times has been at the centre of every major controversy in Britain", he said at the time. "These are the kind of journalistic values I want to reproduce at Fox". Neil's new television programme did not make it to air. A pilot produced in September had a mixed internal response, and Murdoch cancelled the entire project in late October. Neil did not return to his job as Sunday Times editor.

=== Post-News Corp career ===
Neil became a contributor to the Daily Mail. In 1996, he became editor-in-chief of the Barclay brothers' Press Holdings group of newspapers, owner of The Scotsman, Sunday Business (later just The Business) and The European. Press Holdings sold The Scotsman in December 2005, ending Neil's relationship with the newspaper. Neil has not enjoyed great success with the circulations of the newspapers (indeed The European folded shortly after he took over). The Business closed down in February 2008. He exchanged his role as chief executive of Press Holdings for chairman in July 2008. He is chairman of the Press Holdings title The Spectator. In January 2024, Neil told BBC Newsnight that he would quit his role as chairman of The Spectator if a UAE-US consortium is successful in its proposed takeover of the magazine and its sister publication the Daily Telegraph. In September 2024, following the acquisition of The Spectator by Paul Marshall, he resigned as chairman.

Since 2006 Neil has been chair of the Dubai-based publishing company ITP Media Group.

In June 2008, Neil led a consortium which bought talent agency Peters, Fraser & Dunlop (PFD) from CSS Stellar plc for £4 million, making him chairman of the new company in addition to his other activities. Neil served as Lord Rector of the University of St Andrews from 1999 to 2002.

== Broadcasting career ==
As well as Neil's newspaper activities he has maintained a television career. While he worked for The Economist, he provided news reports to American networks.

His regular interview series for Channel 4, Is This Your Life? (made by Open Media), was nominated for a BAFTA award for "Best Talk Show". In the course of the series Neil interviewed a wide variety of personalities, from Albert Reynolds and Morris Cerullo to Jimmy Savile and Max Clifford. He acted as a television newsreader in two films: Dirty Weekend (1993) and Parting Shots (1999), both directed by Michael Winner.

=== Sky ===
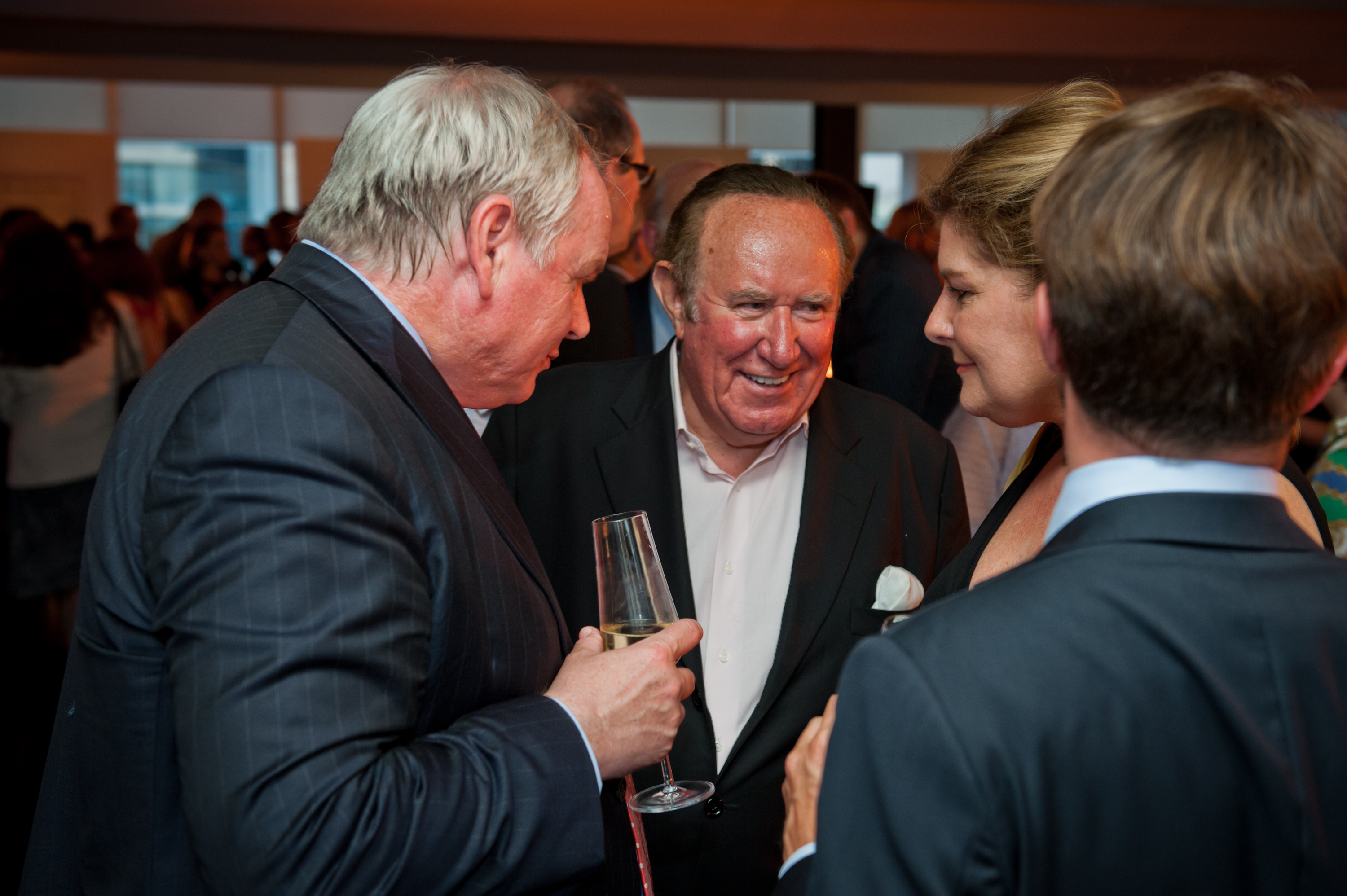
Neil (centre) with Sky News anchor Adam Boulton (left) and Bénédicte Paviot (second from right) in 2013

In 1988 he became founding chairman of Sky TV, also part of Murdoch's News Corporation. Neil was instrumental in the company's launch, overseeing the transformation of a downmarket, single-channel satellite service into a four-channel network in less than a year. Neil and Murdoch stood side by side at Sky's new headquarters in Isleworth on 5 February 1989 to witness the launch of the service. Sky was not an instant success; the uncertainty caused by the competition provided by British Satellite Broadcasting (BSB) and the initial shortage of satellite dishes were early problems.

The failure of BSB in November 1990 led to a merger, but a few programmes acquired by BSB were screened on Sky One and BSB's satellites were sold. The new company was called British Sky Broadcasting (BSkyB). The merger may have saved Sky financially; despite its popularity, Sky had very few major advertisers to begin with, and it was beginning to suffer from embarrassing breakdowns. Acquiring BSB's healthier advertising contracts and equipment apparently solved the problems. BSkyB would not make a profit for a decade but by July 2010, it was one of the most profitable television companies in Europe.

=== BBC ===
At The Sunday Times, he contributed to BBC, both radio and television. He commented on the various controversies provoked by the paper while he was editor. During the 1990s, Neil fronted political programmes for the BBC, including Despatch Box on BBC Two.

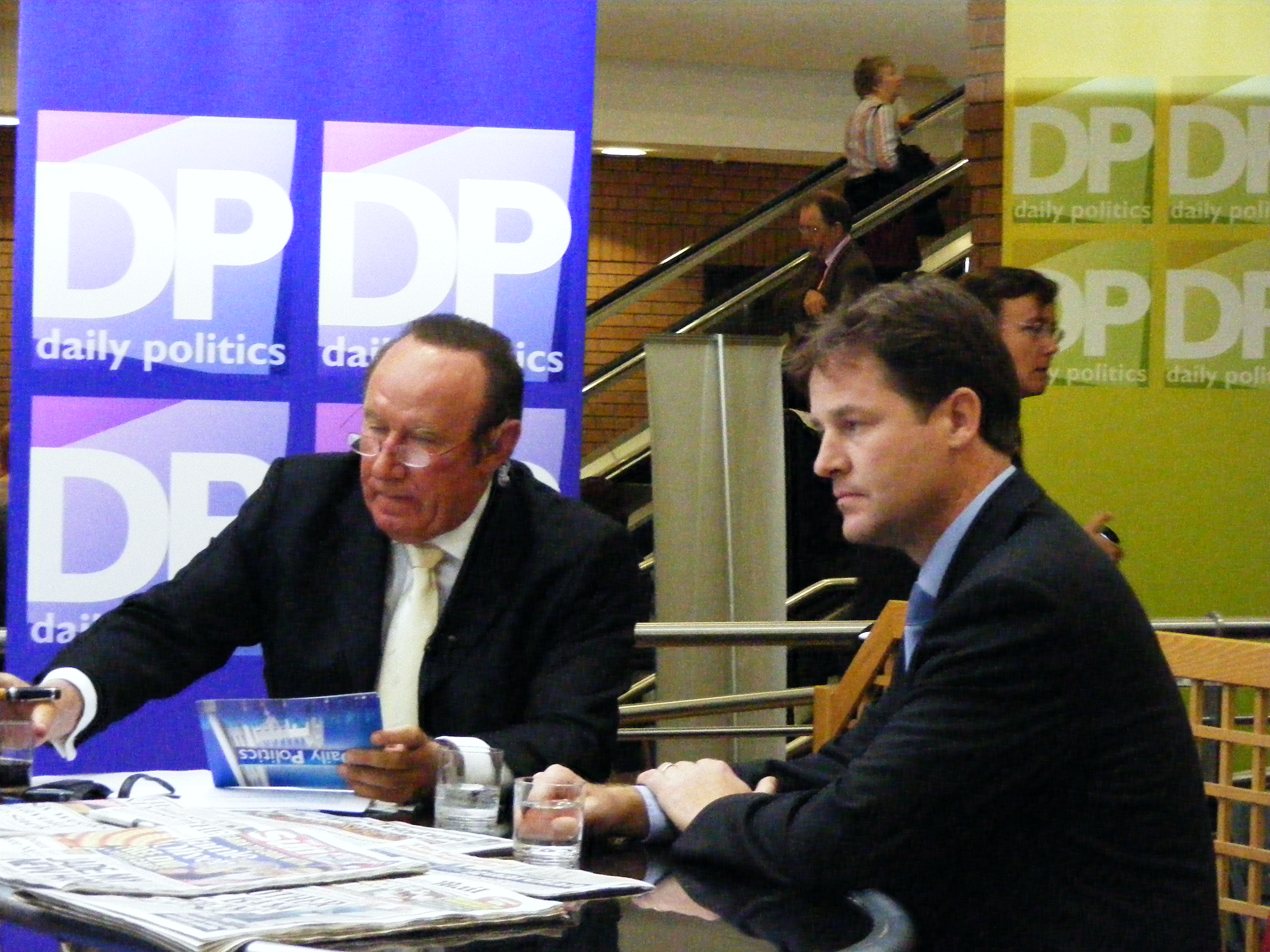
Nick Clegg (right) being interviewed by Andrew Neil for Daily Politics

Following the revamp of the BBC's political programming in early 2003, Neil presented the live political programmes, This Week on BBC One and Daily Politics on BBC Two. The latter ended in 2018 and was replaced by Politics Live, which Neil presented until he left the corporation.

From 2007 to 2010, he presented the weekly one-on-one political interview programme Straight Talk with Andrew Neil on the BBC News channel. He also presented Sunday Politics on BBC One between 2012 and 2017 and occasionally guest presented Newsnight on BBC Two following host Jeremy Paxman's departure in 2014.

During the BBC's general election night coverage in 2010, Neil interviewed various celebrities on the River Thames. In the 2015 election, Neil interviewed political figures in the BBC studio. He also provided commentary on foreign elections, and with Katty Kay led the BBC's overnight live coverage of the US presidential election in 2016. In the run-up to the 2017 general election he interviewed five of the political party leaders on BBC One in The Andrew Neil Interviews.

Neil earned £200,000 to £249,999 as a BBC presenter in the financial year 2016–17.

In May 2019, Neil interviewed Ben Shapiro, an American conservative commentator, on Politics Live on BBC Two. Shapiro was promoting his new book, The Right Side of History, which discusses Judeo-Christian values and asserts their decline in the United States. Shapiro took offence to the questioning, accused Neil of having a left-leaning bias, and said Neil was trying to make a "quick buck... off of the fact that I'm popular and no one has ever heard of you", before Shapiro ended the interview. Shapiro later apologised for the incident.

During the 2019 Conservative Party leadership election, Neil interviewed candidates Jeremy Hunt and Boris Johnson, in The Andrew Neil Interviews. Director of BBC News Fran Unsworth hailed it as "a masterclass of political interviewing".

In August 2019, the BBC announced that Neil would host a prime-time political programme that would run through autumn 2019 on BBC Two, called The Andrew Neil Show. The show included "in-depth analysis and forensic questioning of key political players". It was suspended due to the COVID-19 pandemic in March 2020 and then cancelled as the BBC went through with budget cuts.

On 24 September 2019, Neil presented a live programme on BBC One entitled BBC News Special: Politics in Crisis, addressing the Supreme Court judgement which deemed Boris Johnson's prorogation of parliament unlawful. In the run-up to the 2019 general election, Neil interviewed all the leaders of the main political parties, excluding Johnson, having delivered a monologue in The Andrew Neil Interviews issuing him a challenge to participate.

On 15 July 2020 the BBC announced that Neil was in talks about an interview show on BBC One. The next month he was discussed in the media as Sir David Clementi's possible successor as chairman of the BBC; he later said he had no interest in the role. The Director-General of the BBC, Tim Davie, on his second day in the role, held talks with Neil "in an attempt to get him back to the BBC" and it was reported that he was also in discussions with executives from commercial rivals.

Neil's final appearance for the BBC was when he presented coverage of the 2020 US presidential election, again with Katty Kay.

=== GB News ===
On 25 September 2020, Neil announced his exit from the BBC to become chairman of GB News, a news channel launched on 13 June 2021. As well as being chairman, he presented Andrew Neil, a prime time evening programme on the channel. Two weeks after the channel's launch, after having hosted eight episodes of his show, he announced he would be taking a break. He spent months in his hiatus involved in legal disputes with GB News over ending his contract. However, Neil and the channel publicly maintained that he was taking a holiday, and he was expected to rejoin the channel in early September. As that time approached, multiple news sources reported that his return had been postponed, with some speculating that this postponement might become indefinite. It was further reported that he was "highly unlikely" to return to the channel.

On 13 September 2021, Neil resigned from GB News as chairman and lead presenter and announced he would enter a new role as a guest contributor. Later that month, on the BBC's Question Time, he said that he had left his roles at GB News over the direction the channel was taking, and that he had become a "minority of one" within senior management. It was reported that these remarks had angered GB News bosses and that Neil would not be appearing on GB News again. On 22 September, Neil said he would not return to GB News.

Neil later described his decision to lead the channel as the "single biggest mistake" of his career, comparing the channel to Fox News.

=== Return to Channel 4 ===
In January 2022, it was reported that Neil was in talks with Channel 4 about presenting a weekly politics show to be launched later in 2022. On 30 January, Channel 4 aired a documentary, Boris Johnson: Has He Run Out of Road?, in which Neil explored the future of Boris Johnson's premiership following repeated allegations of parties held in Downing Street during the COVID-19 lockdown. On 21 February, Channel 4 announced he would host a show beginning in May, which would also be accompanied by a weekly podcast. The Andrew Neil Show launched with an interview with cabinet minister Jacob Rees-Mogg, and Neil was also joined by journalists Pippa Crerar and Madeline Grant.

=== Times Radio ===
Since May 2024, Andrew Neil hosts a daily-scheduled lunchtime show on Times Radio, from 1pm to 2pm, in which he provides commentaries and in-depth analysis on current domestic and international affairs, joined by Times journalists, other press columnists or political guests.

== Political positions ==
=== War in Afghanistan ===
Neil was a vocal and enthusiastic proponent of British military involvement in Afghanistan. Neil derided those who opposed the war as "wimps with no will to fight", while labelling The Guardian as The Daily Terrorist and the New Statesman as the New Taliban for publishing dissenting opinions about the wisdom of British military involvement. For questioning whether "Bush and Blair are leading us deeper and deeper into a quagmire", Neil ridiculed Daily Mail columnist Stephen Glover, calling him "woolly, wimpy" and "juvenile". He compared Tony Blair to Winston Churchill and Osama bin Laden to Adolf Hitler, while describing the United States invasion of Afghanistan as a "calibrated response" and a "patient, precise and successful deployment of US military power".

=== War in Iraq ===
Neil was an early advocate of the 2003 invasion of Iraq, describing the case for war and regime change advanced by Tony Blair and George W. Bush as "convincing" and "masterful". In 2002, Neil wrote that Iraq had "embarked on a worldwide shopping spree to buy the technology and material needed to construct weapons of mass destruction – and the missile systems needed to deliver them across great distances", and that "the suburbs of Baghdad are now dotted with secret installations, often posing as hospitals or schools, developing missile fuel, bodies and guidance systems, chemical and biological warheads and, most sinister of all, a renewed attempt to develop nuclear weapons." He wrote that Saddam Hussein would provide Al-Qaeda with weapons of mass destruction, and that Saddam had links to the September 11 attacks.

=== Climate change ===
Neil has been accused of rejecting the scientific consensus on climate change and was criticised for frequently inviting non-scientists and climate change deniers to deny climate change on his BBC programmes. In 2011, Bob Ward of the Grantham Research Institute on Climate Change and the Environment at the London School of Economics, wrote in The Guardian that Neil let inaccurate and misleading statements about climate change go unchallenged on his BBC programme Daily Politics.

In November 2020, Neil said that climate change was real and needed to be confronted. He criticised protests by Extinction Rebellion on Remembrance Day, stating: "I've interviewed Extinction Rebellion on several occasions and most of what they say is total nonsense or total exaggeration."

=== HIV/AIDS ===
During Neil's time as editor, The Sunday Times backed a campaign to falsely claim that HIV was not a cause of AIDS. In 1990, The Sunday Times serialised a book by an American right-winger who rejected the scientific consensus on the causes of AIDS, and who falsely claimed that AIDS could not spread to heterosexuals. Articles and editorials in The Sunday Times cast doubt on the scientific consensus, described HIV as a "politically correct virus" about which there was a "conspiracy of silence," disputed that AIDS was spreading in Africa, claimed that tests for HIV were invalid, described the HIV/AIDS treatment drug azidothymidine (AZT) as harmful, and characterised the World Health Organization (WHO) as an "Empire-building AIDS [organisation]."

The pseudoscientific coverage of HIV/AIDS in The Sunday Times led the scientific journal Nature to monitor the newspaper's coverage and to publish letters rebutting the falsehoods printed in The Sunday Times. In response to this, The Sunday Times published an article headlined "AIDS – why we won't be silenced", which said that Nature engaged in censorship and "sinister intent". In his 1996 book, Full Disclosure, Neil wrote that his HIV/AIDS denialism "deserved publication to encourage debate." That same year, he wrote that The Sunday Times had been vindicated in its coverage, "The Sunday Times was one of a handful of newspapers, perhaps the most prominent, which argued that heterosexual Aids was a myth. The figures are now in and this newspaper stands totally vindicated... The history of Aids is one of the great scandals of our time. I do not blame doctors and the Aids lobby for warning that everybody might be at risk in the early days, when ignorance was rife and reliable evidence scant." He criticised the "AIDS establishment" and said "Aids had become an industry, a job-creation scheme for the caring classes."

In a 2021 interview Neil said that he regretted certain aspects of the paper's coverage of HIV and AIDS, but he was unwilling or unable to accept any personal responsibility for the falsehoods published while he was editor. Neil chose instead to blame an employee, stating that he had placed faith in a trusted correspondent who was found to be wrong.

=== Republicanism ===
In January 1997, ITV broadcast a live television debate Monarchy: The Nation Decides, in which Neil spoke in favour of establishing a republic. When asked in 2021 by the BBC if he was still a republican, he changed his mind, saying "Not really."

== Private Eye ==
The British satirical and investigative journalism magazine Private Eye has referred to Neil by the nickname "Brillo" after his wiry hair, which is seen as bearing a resemblance to a Brillo Pad, a brand of scouring pad.

In a long-running joke, a photograph of Neil wearing a vest and baseball cap in an embrace with a much younger woman (often mistaken for Pamella Bordes, a former Miss India, but really an African American make-up artist with whom Neil was once involved) appeared regularly in the letters page of the magazine for some years, and is still used occasionally. Typically, a reader will ask the editor if he has any photographs relevant to some topical news item, frequently with a veiled allusion to the age-gap between two individuals, or to ethnic diversity. By double entendre, the letter can be construed as a request for this photo, which is duly published alongside. Neil claims to find it "fascinating" and an example of "public school racism" on the part of the magazine's editorial staff.

== Personal life ==
Neil lives in Grasse in the south of France and also has homes in Chelsea, London and Midtown Manhattan, New York City, an apartment within the Trump World Tower. Neil married Susan Nilsson, a Swedish communications director, on 8 August 2015.

Neil has threatened to sue American businesswoman Jennifer Arcuri over claims she made on Twitter linking Neil to the billionaire and child sex abuser Jeffrey Epstein, as well as other Twitter users who retweeted or endorsed her now-deleted tweet. Neil denies ever meeting Epstein and argues he was put in his infamous "black book" by Ghislaine Maxwell, Epstein's procurer.

After watching Gomorrah, Neil developed an interest in Italian rap music, calling it "the best rap music there is."

== Honours ==
=== Honorary degrees ===
Location	Date	School	Degree
Scotland	1998	Napier University	Doctor of Letters (DLitt)
Scotland	20 November 2001	University of Paisley	Doctor of the University (DUniv)
Scotland	29 November 2002	University of St Andrews	Doctor of Laws (LLD)
Scotland	13 June 2018	University of Glasgow	Doctor of the University (DUniv)

=== Memberships and fellowships ===
Country	Date	Organisation	Position
United Kingdom		Royal Society of Arts	Fellow (FRSA)

Media offices
Preceded by Frank Giles	Editor of The Sunday Times; 1983–1994	Succeeded by John Witherow
Preceded by Charles Garside	Editor of The European; 1996–1998	Succeeded by Gerry Malone
New title	Chairman of GB News; 2021	Succeeded by Paul Marshall; Acting
Academic offices
Preceded by Donald Findlay	Rector of the University of St Andrews; 1999–2002	Succeeded by Clement Freud
