= Norman Smith (journalist) =

British journalist (born 1959)

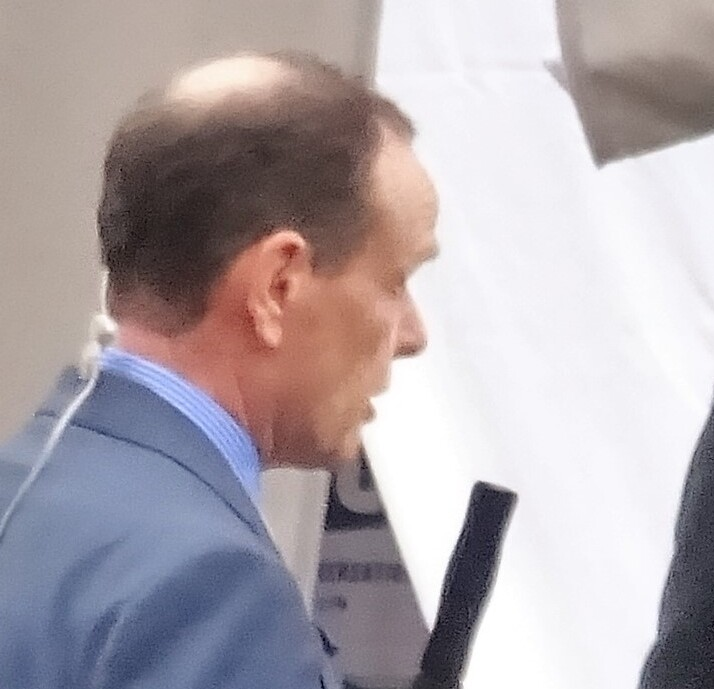
- Born: 30 April 1959 (age 66); Kensington, London, England
- Education: Oundle School
- Alma mater: St Peter's College, Oxford
- Occupation: Journalist
- Years active: 1986–2020
- Notable credit(s): Today; Yesterday in Parliament; BBC News; Victoria Derbyshire

Norman Stuart Smith (born 30 April 1959) is a British journalist. He became the chief political correspondent of BBC News in 2011, and was its assistant political editor from 2014 to 2020.

== Education ==
Smith was educated at Oundle School and St Peter's College, Oxford, where he read history.

== Career ==
Smith began his career in regional newspapers in Birmingham and Bristol, before joining the BBC as a local radio reporter in 1986. Smith became a parliamentary correspondent in 1993, presenting Today and Yesterday in Parliament on BBC Radio 4. He has reported for the BBC from the Palace of Westminster since 1999. In 2010, he became chief political correspondent for Radio 4.

In July 2011, Smith was appointed to the position of chief political correspondent for the BBC News channel, replacing Laura Kuenssberg who departed to ITN, before then being promoted to the position of assistant political editor in 2014.

Since 2015, Smith has been a relief presenter for Victoria Derbyshire on BBC Two and the BBC News Channel.

The BBC Radio 4 Today programme said a fond farewell to Smith at the end of July 2020. He said he wanted to spend more time with friends and family, and "walking his dog". BBC News at One also paid tribute to him as he contributed his final live link to the programme. He left the BBC at a time BBC News was making budget cuts with forthcoming cuts in redundancy payments.

== See also ==
- List of former BBC newsreaders and journalists

Media offices
New title	Chief Political Correspondent: BBC Radio 4; 2010–2011	Succeeded by Gary O'Donoghue
Preceded by Laura Kuenssberg	Chief Political Correspondent: BBC News; 2011–2014	Succeeded by Vicki Young
New title	Assistant Political Editor: BBC News; 2014–2020	Succeeded by TBD
