= The Westminster Hour =

- Genre: Politics and current affairs
- Running time: 60 minutes
- Country of origin: United Kingdom
- Language: English
- Home station: BBC Radio 4
- Hosted by: Ben Wright
- Recording studio: BBC Millbank, Westminster
- Original release: 12 April 1998 – present
- No. of episodes: 440+
- Website: www.bbc.co.uk/programmes/b006s624
- Podcast: www.bbc.co.uk/programmes/p02nrs6c/episodes/downloads

The Westminster Hour is a British political news review produced by BBC News, broadcast on BBC Radio 4 each Sunday evening between 22:00 (10 PM) and 23:00 (11 PM) UK time, with a national and international news bulletin at the beginning. The programme has been broadcast since 12 April 1998.

The bells of the Westminster Clock Tower, including Big Ben, are broadcast live just before the programme starts. (Note: The bells are only truly live on analogue radio, such as FM or AM.) There have been over 440 episodes broadcast. Despite the reference in its title to the Palace of Westminster – meeting-place of the Houses of the United Kingdom Parliament – the programme also deals with topics and events connected with the work of the UK's devolved legislative assemblies in Belfast, Cardiff, Edinburgh, and London.

== Presenters ==
Ben Wright, one of the BBC's political correspondents, is the current presenter of The Westminster Hour. Previous hosts include Carolyn Quinn (a former presenter of Radio 4's Today programme) and Andrew Rawnsley (chief political commentator at The Observer).
