= Ben Wright (journalist) =

British journalist

- Born: Birmingham, England
- Education: King Edward VI Five Ways; St Peter's College, Oxford
- Occupation: Journalist
- Parents: Tony Wright (father); Moira Phillips (mother)

Ben Wright is a British journalist who is a political correspondent for BBC News, the main newsgathering department of the BBC, and its 24-hour television news channels BBC World News and BBC News Channel, as well as the BBC's domestic television and radio channels and the BBC World Service. He is also the presenter of The Westminster Hour on BBC Radio 4. He was formerly Chief Political Correspondent for BBC Radio 4, having been appointed to the position in March 2012. He became Washington Correspondent in December 2012, before moving back to London.

== Early life ==
Wright, the son of former Labour MP and Public Administration Select Committee chairman Tony Wright, and his wife, Moira Phillips, was born in Birmingham. He was educated at the voluntary-aided grammar school King Edward VI Five Ways in Bartley Green, Birmingham, followed by St Peter's College, Oxford, where he read Modern History.

== Career ==
Prior to being appointed a BBC political correspondent in March 2008, Wright had worked on a number of programmes, including The World at One, Today, PM, and The Daily Politics. Wright was appointed political correspondent along with Iain Watson as replacements for the departing James Hardy and Guto Harri. He has worked extensively for the BBC, covering stories around the world, including India, Africa, the United States and mainland Europe. Wright currently focuses primarily on issues relating to British politics.

== Personal life ==
Ben Wright is married to Poppy Mitchell-Rose, formerly a BBC and Reuters employee, special adviser (2010 to 2012) to Chancellor of the Exchequer, George Osborne and currently a director at Freuds Communications.

Media offices
Preceded by Gary O'Donoghue	Chief Political Correspondent: BBC Radio 4; 2012	Succeeded by Gary O'Donoghue
