= Gary O'Donoghue =

English journalist (born 1968)

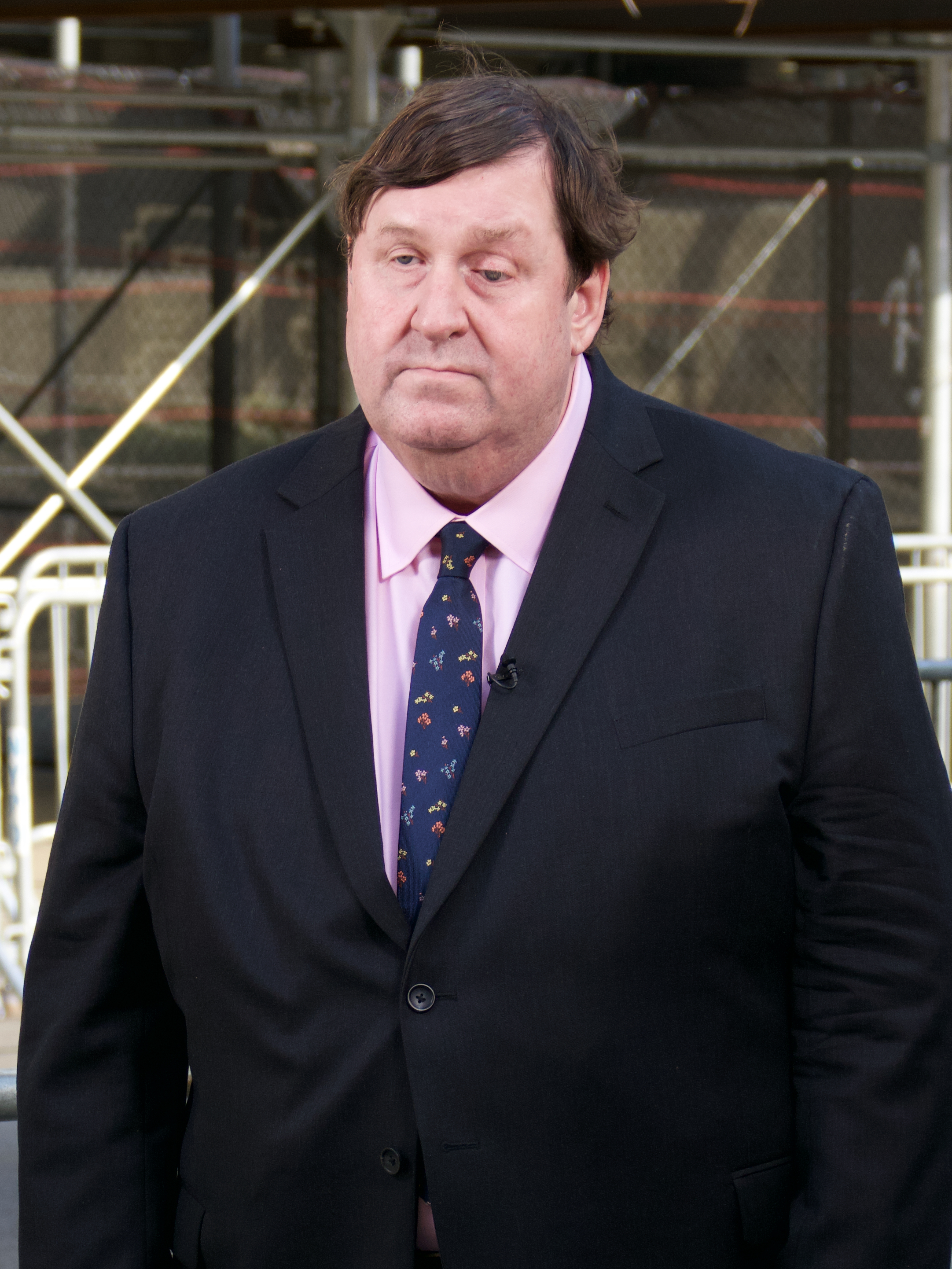
- O'Donoghue in 2024
- Born: 1968 (age 57–58); North London, England
- Education: University of Oxford
- Occupation: Journalist
- Employer: BBC
- Notable credit: BBC News
- Title: Chief North America political correspondent for BBC News
- Partner: Sarah Lewthwaite
- Children: 1
- O'Donoghue's voice recorded 2012, as part of an audio description of the Elizabeth Tower for VocalEyes

Gary O'Donoghue (born 1968) is an English journalist who works in Washington, D.C. as the chief North America political correspondent for BBC News. He is blind.

== Early life and education ==
O'Donoghue was born in North London in 1968 and was brought up in Hornchurch, Greater London, with two brothers, Steven and Andrew. His father Frank was a semi-professional football player who also worked as a taxi driver, and his mother taught ballroom dancing. O'Donoghue was born partially sighted, for unknown reasons, but went totally blind by the time he was eight.

He was educated at Worcester College for the Blind (then a boys' boarding school though it has since merged with a similarly specialised girls' school), where he played blind football for England. O'Donoghue then studied philosophy and modern languages at the University of Oxford as an undergraduate student at Christ Church, Oxford.

== Career ==
O'Donoghue undertook work experience at the BBC. He then joined the BBC on graduation from university, becoming a junior reporter on BBC Radio 4's Today programme; at one time, he was asked to bungee jump off Chelsea Bridge. During his career, he has covered stories for BBC News in Africa, Asia, Europe and the U.S. In 2004, he became a political correspondent based at Westminster, reporting across the media of radio, television and internet. From October 2011, O'Donoghue was the chief political correspondent for BBC Radio 4 replacing Norman Smith, primarily reporting for the Today and PM programmes. He has also been an occasional presenter of Newshour on the BBC World Service.

In 2007, he broke the story that new UK Prime Minister Gordon Brown was returning early from holiday to deal with an outbreak of foot-and-mouth disease in Surrey. However, BBC News at Ten deputy editor Daniel Pearl handed the story to June Kelly, which, in 2008, resulted in an out-of-court five-figure payment to O'Donoghue on grounds of disability discrimination.

At the 2014 BBC News Festival, it was revealed that O'Donoghue would be moving to Washington, D.C., as chief North America political correspondent for BBC News. Since then he has covered US politics, including the first presidency of Donald Trump and the presidency of Joe Biden. Between assignments, in summer 2014 he toured UK universities, telling journalism students about his career and experience.

On 13 July 2024, O'Donoghue was reporting from a Donald Trump rally at Butler, Pennsylvania, when there was an assassination attempt on Trump. Shortly afterwards, he reported from the event while taking cover on the ground. He then interviewed eyewitnesses.

In March 2025, BBC News announced the appointment of O’Donoghue as its new chief North America correspondent.

In summer 2025 O'Donoghue secured a scoop with a twenty-minute telephone interview with Trump, of which O'Donoghue had almost no prior notice.

On 26 April 2026, O'Donoghue was reporting from the White House Correspondents Association, when there was an attempted assassination on US President Donald Trump. He questioned 'how many of these things you have to go through in this country before your luck runs out'.

== Personal life ==
O'Donoghue and his partner Sarah Lewthwaite have a home at Slaithwaite in West Yorkshire; they are parents to one daughter.

In May 2026 O'Donoghue was the guest for BBC Radio 4's Desert Island Discs. His choices included "Ça plane pour moi" by Plastic Bertrand (the first record he ever bought), "Clevor Trever" by Ian Dury & the Blockheads, "West End Girls" by Pet Shop Boys and "La fille aux cheveux de lin" (Préludes / Book 1, L. 117: VIII) by Claude Debussy. His favourite track was Blind Willie Johnson singing "Dark Was the Night, Cold Was the Ground", his chosen book was Bertrand Russell's A History of Western Philosophy and his luxury item a red leather cricket ball.

Like his father Frank, he is a supporter of Spurs.

Media offices
Preceded by Norman Smith	Chief Political Correspondent: BBC Radio 4; 2011–2012	Succeeded by Ben Wright
Preceded by Ben Wright	Chief Political Correspondent: BBC Radio 4; 2012–2014 present	Succeeded by Incumbent
Preceded by New Post	Chief North American Political Correspondent: BBC News; 2014–present	Succeeded by Incumbent
