= Vicki Young =

British journalist, currently BBC News Deputy Political Editor

- Born: 1971 (age 54–55)
- Education: Truro High School for Girls; New Hall, Cambridge
- Occupation: Journalist
- Employer: BBC
- Title: Chief Political Correspondent of BBC News (2015–2020); Deputy Political Editor of BBC News (2020–present); Presenter Politics Live (2025–)
- Spouse: Rae Stewart (m. 2005; died 2023)
- Children: 2

Vicki Young (born 1971) is a British journalist. She has been the Deputy Political Editor of BBC News since October 2020 and the presenter of Politics Live since June 2025.

She was formerly the chief political correspondent and has contributed to BBC coverage of seven general elections. She has occasionally served as a relief presenter on the BBC News channel.

== Early life ==
Young attended Truro High School for Girls, finishing in 1988. During her senior years she was head girl at the school. She then attended New Hall, Cambridge.

== Career ==
Young's career at the BBC began as a reporter at BBC Wales before joining the One O'Clock News as a political correspondent. She was a correspondent for BBC Breakfast from 2008 to 2011. In 2015, Young was promoted to the role of BBC News' chief political correspondent. She was given the position in response to Norman Smith's promotion to assistant political editor. In 2014, she served as a sit-in reporter for Daily Politics and has also reported for BBC Radio 4 and BBC Radio 5 Live. In 2020 she was appointed as deputy political editor.

On 4 April 2025, the BBC announced Young would be the new presenter of Politics Live, replacing Jo Coburn.

Media offices
Preceded by Norman Smith	Chief Political Correspondent: BBC News; 2015–2020	Succeeded by Adam Fleming
Preceded by John Pienaar	Deputy Political Editor: BBC News; 2020–present	Incumbent
