= Kate McCann =

British journalist (born 1988)

- Born: 15 April 1988 (age 38)
- Education: Newcastle University
- Occupations: Journalist, television presenter
- Known for: The Daily Telegraph; Sky News; TalkTV; Times Radio

Kathryn "Kate" Emma McCann (born 15 April 1988) is a British journalist who has co-presented the Monday to Thursday breakfast show on Times Radio with Stig Abell since February 2025. Prior to this, she was the political editor of Times Radio between 2023 and 2025, political editor of TalkTV between 2022 and 2023, a political correspondent for Sky News between 2018 and 2022, and The Daily Telegraph's senior political correspondent between 2015 and 2018.

== Early life and education ==
McCann was born on 15 April 1988. Her parents both worked for the NHS and she has one brother. Their family motto is "Dare to be Different". She grew up in Yorkshire and attended a comprehensive school. McCann then studied politics at the Newcastle University, graduating in 2009. While at the university, she was a news editor for the student newspaper, The Courier.

== Career ==
After graduation, McCann worked in parliament as an MP's researcher till 2011 when she then undertook unpaid internships at various media outlets with the aim of becoming a journalist.

In September 2015, McCann joined The Daily Telegraph as senior political correspondent, having previously worked for The Guardian, City A.M., and as The Sun's Whitehall correspondent. Her stories included the publication of a leaked draft of Labour leader Jeremy Corbyn's manifesto, less than a month before the 2017 general election. She described it as the highlight of her career in a 2022 interview. The following year, she became the Chair of the Press Gallery, only the second female chair in its 200-year history.

She left The Daily Telegraph in July 2018 to join Sky News as a political correspondent. After four years at Sky News, she became the political editor of TalkTV. In July 2022, McCann co-hosted TalkTV's televised election debate between Rishi Sunak and Liz Truss, the two remaining candidates for the leadership of the Conservative Party. After half an hour, when Truss was making a speech, McCann fainted; as a result, the show came off air and was later cancelled. She recovered shortly afterwards and apologised to both candidates on social media.

She co-hosted a Sunday morning political show with Adam Boulton on Times Radio from September 2022. In July 2023, it was announced that McCann would become the station's political editor in September 2023. In the same month, she received an Honorary Doctorate of Arts from the University of Sunderland. In February 2024, McCann shared her experience of having her drink spiked in a bar "by a group of men so brazen they didn't care who saw", following an investigation by The Times into the extent of drink-spiking in the UK.

McCann has co-presented the Times Radio breakfast show with Stig Abell since February 2025.
