= The End of the Party (book) =

2010 nonfiction book by Andrew Rawnsley

The End of the Party: The Rise and Fall of New Labour
- Author: Andrew Rawnsley
- Language: English
- Genre: Non-fiction
- Publisher: Viking
- Publication date: 2010
- Publication place: United Kingdom
- Pages: 801
- ISBN: 9780670918515

The End of the Party: The Rise and Fall of New Labour is a book by political journalist Andrew Rawnsley detailing the centre-left New Labour Premiership of Tony Blair between 2001, when Blair was re-elected as Prime Minister of the United Kingdom, through to his resignation in 2007 when Gordon Brown formed his government, and through to just before Labour's defeat in 2010.
