= Mrs. Henry Clarke =

English historical fiction writer (1853–1908)

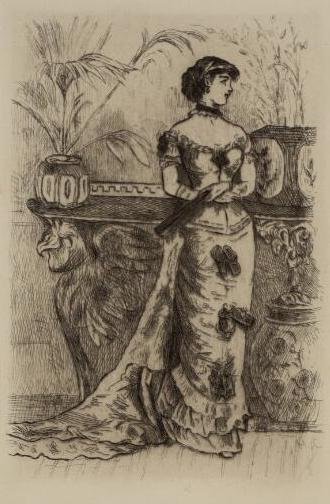
Portrait of Mrs. Henry Clark

Amy Clarke (pen name, Mrs. Henry Clarke; 17 April 1853 – 4 March 1908), was an English writer of historical fiction and children's books.

== Life ==
The daughter of Joseph Henry Key and Elizabeth Hosking, Clarke was born Amy Key in Plymouth in 1853. She started writing when young, publishing a story in the magazine Good Words when she was 16. At 20, she obtained a first in the Cambridge Examination and began teaching at Plymouth High School for Girls. Two years later, she took a year's leave to read mathematics at Newnham College, Cambridge. She left Plymouth High School in 1880 to become the first headmistress of Truro High School for Girls.

Clarke still continued her education, attending the University of London to earn an external MA. While at university, she met the lecturer Henry Clarke, whom she married in 1889. They had four children: John Henry Clarke (born 1891), Walter Oakley Clarke (1892), Amy Key Clarke (1893–1980) and Wilfrid Kinton Clarke (1894). After her marriage, Clarke limited her teaching to occasional lectures at Westfield College in Hampstead, London. Her main occupation became writing.

In 1908, she died of cancer.

== Selected works ==
- A Clever Daughter, illustrated by Ida Lovering. Sunday School Union (1896)
- A High School Girl, or, The Secret of the Old Bureau, illustrated by H. A. Boole. Sunday School Union (1895)
- A Lad of Devon, illustrated. Nelson (1898)
- A Trusty Rebel, or, A Follower of Warbeck, illustrated by Walter C. Grieve. Nelson
- A Village Tyrant, illustrated by Walter S. Stacey. Society for Promoting Christian Knowledge (SPCK)
- Dorothy's Discovery, illustrated by John Jellicoe. Sunday School Union
- Gipsy Dick, or, Two Little Brothers, illustrated by H. M. Brock (frontispiece) and Richard Tod. Blackie
- Honor Pentreath, a story in two parts, illustrated. SPCK
- Hope's Legacy, or, The Ardleighs of Ardleigh, illustrated. Sunday School Union (1895)
- In Jacobite Days – Being a Plain Narrative of Certain Events Connected with the Landing of His Late Majesty King William at Torbay, and with the Burning of the Town of Teignmouth by the French, written by the Rev. Gilbert Lane, D D, Rector of Withycombe in the County of Devon, illustrated by G. C. Hindley. Nelson
- Into Stormy Waters. Sunday School Union (1901)
- James Godfrey's Wife, illustrated by F. Barnard. SPCK, (1894)
- Jennifer's Fortune, illustrated, SPCK (1893)
- Little Miss Vanity, illustrated by Walter S. Stacey. Blackie
- Matthew Parkyn, illustrated by Walter S. Stacey. SPCK (1896)
- Miss Merivale's Mistake, illustrated by Florence Meyerheim. Sunday School Union
  - reprinted by The Echo Library (2007) ISBN 978-1-40684-614-0
  - Webster's Thesaurus Editions in various languages (2008)
- Nan's Schooldays, illustrated by Dorothy Travers-Pope. Sunday School Union
- Put to the Proof, illustrated by Will Dodds. Blackie (1903)
  - Small format, illustrated by R. H. Brock. Blackie
- Ralph the Outlaw, a Tale of Adventure in Mediæval England, illustrated. Nelson
- Roscorla Farm, illustrated by W. H. Overend. SPCK
- Roskelly of Roskelly, illustrated by Walter S. Stacey. SPCK (1900)
- Rueben Thorne's Temptation, illustrated by J. Nash. SPCK
- Teddy's Adventures, illustrated by E. A. Cubitt. Blackie
- That Boy Jim, illustrated by S. B. Pearse. Blackie
- The Bushranger's Secret, illustrated by Walter S. Stacey. Blackie
- The Coplestone Cousins, illustrated. SPCK (1905)
- The Fairclough Family, illustrated by G. Demain Hammond. Blackie (1903)
- The Mystery of the Manor House, illustrated by Harold Copping. Blackie (1898)
- The Ravensworth Scholarship, a High School Story for Girls, illustrated by John H. Bacon. Blackie
- The Roskerry Treasure, A Tale of Wyatt's Rebellion, illustrated. Nelson

== See also ==
- List of children's literature writers
- List of English writers
- List of historical novelists
- List of people associated with the University of London
- List of people from Plymouth
- List of University of Cambridge people
- List of women writers
