= Amy Clarke =

English poet and writer

Amy Key Clarke (21 December 1892 – 20 June 1980) was an English mystical poet and writer, and a teacher at The Cheltenham Ladies' College.

== Early life and education ==
Clarke was born at 121 Elgin Crescent, Kensington, London, England to Henry Clarke, a lecturer and tutor, and his wife Amy (née Key, also known as Mrs. Henry Clarke), a writer and first headmistress of Truro High School.

She was educated at St Paul's Girls' School and at The Cheltenham Ladies' College where she was a student at St Hilda's House from 1905 to 1906 – the senior house of the college.

== Clarke and Florence Cunningham ==
In 1917 Clarke stayed for seven weeks with Florence Cunningham (1871–1950, granddaughter of writer Peter Cunningham) at her home in Bayswater. Florence was a mystic who believed herself to be a prophet whom the voices she heard addressed as "Mary": She compared herself to Abraham, Isaiah and The Messiah, but it should be said that she was later, for a short period, committed to the care of the Holloway Sanatorium in Virginia Water, Surrey. Florence's daughter was Edith Cunningham, then 18, whom Amy had met at St Paul's Girls' School. Edith was attracted to Amy because of her "poetic nature", and it was for this reason that Edith introduced her to her mother, thinking that Amy would be interested in her newly received "enlightenment".

Clarke was enamoured of the spirituality in the poems of Florence, and wrote to Florence from Newnham College saying that she was inspired and wanted to come and stay with her. This announcement was a surprise, but Cunningham did not refuse her because she was a friend of her daughter. Clarke stayed for 7 weeks, and during that time she would speak to Cunningham while in a state of inspiration for one or two hours at a time, only in the presence of her husband and daughter. Clarke related that miracles happened which were also witnessed by her family during her sojourn in order to try to demonstrate that she was under the control of higher powers. Clarke left as suddenly as she came, in an agreeable way: She wrote to Florence on Christmas Eve, 1917, addressing her as "My dear Mother."

== Career ==
That year, Clarke wrote a mystical poem "Vision of Him" which the same year was published in the Oxford Book of English Mystical Verse.

After reading classics at Newnham College she returned in 1924 to teach as senior classical mistress, becoming successively head of classics, head of upper college, and director of university entrants. She was away from 1939 to 1947, and she returned as house mistress of Cheltenham's St. Hilda's House until 1948. In 1950 she wrote on mystical religious philosophy, The Universal Character of Christianity.

She finally retired from school administrative work in 1953. Clarke published a scholarly edition of a commentary on Claudian's De Raptu Proserpine by Geoffrey of Vitry, and wrote two histories of the Cheltenham Ladies' College and a history of Truro High School for Girls.

== Works ==
- The Universal Character of Christianity. London: Faber and Faber, 1950
- A History of the Cheltenham Ladies' College, 1853-1953. London: Faber and Faber, 1953
- The Commentary of Geoffrey of Vitry on Claudian De raptu Proserpinae: Transcribed and edited by A.K. Clarke and P.M.Giles, with an introduction and notes by A.K. Clarke (Leiden, Köln: E. J. Brill, 1973)
- A History of the Cheltenham Ladies' College, 1853-1979. Suffolk: John Catt, 1979
- The Story of Truro High School, the Benson Foundation: with a memoir of its first headmistress Amy Key. 1980

== Death ==
Clarke died at the age of 87 in 1980. She was living at the time in St. Ninian's, Victoria Street, Cambridge.
