= The Andrew Neil Show (2019 TV programme) =

2019 British television programme

- Genre: Politics
- Directed by: Janet McAllen
- Presented by: Andrew Neil
- Country of origin: United Kingdom
- Original language: English

Production
- Producer: Hugh Milbourn
- Editor: Rob Burley
- Running time: 30 minutes

Original release
- Network: BBC Two
- Release: 4 September 2019 – 11 March 2020

Related
- This Week; Politics Live; The Andrew Neil Show (2022)

The Andrew Neil Show was a BBC political programme presented by Andrew Neil. It was broadcast on BBC Two every Wednesday evening. It was launched on 4 September 2019 and returned for a second series on 8 January 2020. The show came off-air during the COVID-19 pandemic on 11 March 2020 and was then cancelled as a result of budget cuts at the BBC.

== Background ==
Neil's long-running politics and current affairs programme This Week ended in July 2019 following his decision to "step down from late-night broadcasting". His lunchtime Daily Politics show ended in 2018 after 15 years.

A programme, also called The Andrew Neil Show, aired on daytime BBC Two, three times per week on weekday afternoons during 1996, where viewers would have the opportunity to question newsmakers via phone, fax and email. The latter part of the programme was simulcast on BBC World, which gave it an international feel.

The second incarnation of The Andrew Neil Show was first announced on 29 August 2019 in a statement from the BBC's press office. Ahead of the announcement, Rob Burley, the editor of BBC live political programmes, tweeted a teaser of the programme's logo, a superimposed 'A' and 'N'. Upon announcement, Neil said: "I'm delighted to be fronting a weekly show in prime time on BBC Two that will be on top of the story, whatever direction it takes. The autumn of 2019 is destined to be one of the most intriguing and significant in British politics for at least a generation". Neil continued to present Politics Live on BBC Two every Thursday lunchtime in addition to the programme.

== Format ==
The Andrew Neil Show aired at 7 pm on Wednesdays and focused on Brexit. It rounded up political events of the week and featured interviews with key politicians. Other BBC journalists frequently appeared on the show to offer their analysis, with BBC political editor Laura Kuenssberg being the most frequent guest. Other journalists that appeared included Hugh Pym and Adam Fleming.

== Episodes ==
=== Series 1 ===
No. in season	Guests	Original release date
1	Rishi Sunak and John Healey	September 4, 2019
2	Kwasi Kwarteng and Nigel Farage	September 11, 2019
3	Layla Moran and Andy McDonald	September 18, 2019
4	Robert Jenrick, Kirsty Blackman and Nick Thomas-Symonds	September 25, 2019
5	Tony Blair and Zion Lights	October 9, 2019 (Note: There was no programme on 2 October 2019 due to BBC Two live coverage of the World Athletics Championships in Qatar.)
6	Brandon Lewis, Philip Hammond and Jenny Chapman	October 16, 2019
7	Robert Buckland and Alastair Campbell	October 23, 2019
8	Jo Swinson and James Cleverly	October 30, 2019
9	Nadhim Zahawi and Andy McDonald	November 6, 2019
10	Jonathan Ashworth and David Linden	November 13, 2019
11	Brandon Lewis and Sir Ed Davey	November 20, 2019
12	Barry Gardiner and Robert Buckland	November 27, 2019
13	Andy McDonald, Siân Berry, Ben Habib and Michael Heseltine	December 11, 2019 (Note: There was no programme on 4 December 2019 due to Neil's interview with Jo Swinson in The Andrew Neil Interviews.) (Note: This episode was an hour long due to the 2019 general election taking place the next day.)

=== Series 2 ===
No. in season	Guests	Original release date
1	Clive Lewis and Mark Dubowitz	January 8, 2020
2	Lisa Nandy	January 15, 2020
3	Emily Thornberry	January 22, 2020
4	Peter Mandelson and David Davis	January 29, 2020
5	John Whittingdale, Nathalie Loiseau and Jonathan Hall	February 5, 2020
6	Andy Burnham and Tom Tugendhat	February 12, 2020
7	Tobias Ellwood and Ian Murray	February 26, 2020 (Note: There was no programme on 19 February 2020 due to the February parliamentary recess.)
8	Keir Starmer and Rebecca Long-Bailey	March 4, 2020 (Note: This episode was an hour long as Neil interviewed two of the candidates in the 2020 Labour Party leadership election.)
9	Susan Michie and John McDonnell	March 11, 2020 (Note: There was no programme after 11 March 2020 due to the BBC scaling back its programming in response to the COVID-19 pandemic.)

== Reception ==
The Telegraph gave the programme five stars, saying "Neil is back and taking no nonsense from either the left or the right".

The first episode of the programme was watched by an average of 800,000 viewers. According to Neil, the programme "was beating Channel 4 News every time it was on".
