= Despatch Box =

BBC Television late night political analysis programme

- The final programme titles
- Genre: News
- Presented by: Zeinab Badawi; Michael Dobbs; Andrew Neil; Steve Richards
- Country of origin: United Kingdom
- Original language: English

Production
- Production company: BBC

Original release
- Network: BBC Two
- Release: 20 October 1998 – 20 December 2002

Related
- The Midnight Hour; This Week

Despatch Box is a late night political analysis television programme produced by the BBC. It was broadcast on BBC Two between 20 October 1998 and 20 December 2002. The programme replaced the nightly political programme The Midnight Hour, and like its predecessor, was initially presented by a team of single-presenter journalists, rotated nightly, consisting of Zeinab Badawi, Michael Dobbs, Andrew Neil and Steve Richards. The programme regularly gained an audience of more than 350,000 viewers. Following a change of format, it was decided that the programme should have one, regular presenter, a role for which Andrew Neil was chosen. The programme was produced at the BBC's Millbank studios in London.

Following changes to sitting hours in the United Kingdom parliament, and extensive changes to the BBC's line-up of political programmes, Despatch Box was discontinued, and the programme's then regular presenter, Andrew Neil, moved on to present the Daily Politics and This Week.

== See also ==
- Westminster Live
