= Stig Abell =

English journalist and radio presenter

- Born: Stephen Paul Abell; 10 April 1980 (age 46); Nottingham, England
- Other name: Stig
- Education: Emmanuel College, Cambridge
- Occupations: journalist; radio presenter

Stephen "Stig" Abell (born 10 April 1980) is an English journalist and radio presenter. He co-presents the Monday to Thursday breakfast show on Times Radio with Kate McCann.

From 2016 to 2020 Abell was editor of The Times Literary Supplement and from 2013 to 2016 managing editor of The Sun. He was formerly a fiction reviewer at The Spectator and reviewer at Telegraph Media Group as well as The Times Literary Supplement. He was also a presenter on LBC Radio.

== Education ==
Abell was born in Nottingham and educated at Loughborough Grammar School. He studied English at Emmanuel College, Cambridge, graduating with a double first.

== Career ==
In September 2001, Abell joined the Press Complaints Commission as a complaints officer; he completed other roles at the PCC including press officer, assistant director, and deputy director before being appointed director of the PCC in December 2009. In August 2013, Abell joined The Sun as managing editor, staying in the role until 2016.

In March 2014, Abell started co-presenting a show on LBC Radio with Kay Burley on Sunday mornings.

In 2015, Abell was heavily criticised for publishing a racist anti-immigration article by Katie Hopkins in The Sun. The article argued for "gunships sending these boats back to their own country," and described migrants as "like cockroaches." It concluded that Britain should "force migrants back to their shores and burn the boats."

In May 2016, Abell became the editor of The Times Literary Supplement, succeeding Peter Stothard. He held the post until June 2020, when he was succeeded by Martin Ivens.

In May 2018, Abell's first book, How Britain Really Works, was published by John Murray.

Abell was formerly a regular presenter on the BBC Radio 4 series Front Row. In April 2020, it was announced that Abell would be joining the upcoming radio station Times Radio as a presenter. He was also named as the station's launch director.

In November 2020, he released his second book, Things I Learned on the 6.28: A Guide to Daily Reading. In September 2021, The Bookseller reported that HarperCollins had agreed to a three-book deal with Abell's agents including his first work of crime fiction and a non-fiction title. HarperCollins has published three books in his Jake Jackson series.

In February 2025, Abell began co-presenting a new breakfast show on Times Radio alongside the station's political editor, Kate McCann.
