= The Sunday Edition =

2006 British TV programme

- Genre: Politics
- Presented by: Andrew Rawnsley, Andrea Catherwood
- Country of origin: United Kingdom

Production
- Producer: ITV Productions
- Running time: 44 minutes (exc. adverts)

Original release
- Network: ITV
- Release: 17 September 2006 – 18 November 2007

Related
- ITV News; Jonathan Dimbleby; Peston on Sunday

The Sunday Edition is a television programme broadcast on the ITV Network in the United Kingdom focusing on political interview and discussion, produced by ITV Productions. The show was hosted by Andrew Rawnsley and Andrea Catherwood.

The live studio show continued the tradition of live political programming on ITV at the weekend. It featured the traditional "long format" interview as well as incisive debate by key players in politics, the arts and business.

The programme included an ITV News Summary at the beginning and end of the programme.

The programme has three distinct segments:

- Breaking news and political stories will kick off the programme and be brought up to the minute by interviews with key figures and commentators.
- The in-depth political interview will lie at the heart of the show.
- Discussion of major issues and interviews with big names from across the range of arts, business and culture will offer insight and provoke debate.

When the programme changed its time slot, to the earlier time of 09:25, low ratings of 250,000 cast doubt over its future. The programme ended in November 2007.
