= John Pienaar =

British journalist (born 1956)

- Born: John Adrian Pienaar; 2 October 1956 (age 69); Middlesex, England
- Occupation: Journalist
- Spouses: Denise Walsh (m. 1980, divorced): Penny Davies
- Children: 4

John Adrian Pienaar (born 2 October 1956) is a British journalist who rose to prominence as deputy political editor of BBC News. He has worked for Times Radio since 2020.

== Early life ==
Pienaar was born in Middlesex. His parents, Eric and Johanna Pienaar, were both born in South Africa. He was educated at Bromley Technical High School, in Keston, Bromley, London, one of two black boys there. He then obtained his NCTJ training at Highbury College, Portsmouth.

== Career ==
Pienaar began his career in journalism at the South London Press, before becoming an Old Bailey correspondent. He was then a political correspondent at The Independent, the Press Association, and, from 1992, the BBC, where he contributed to a range of TV and radio news and current affairs programmes.

In 2002, he became chief political correspondent at BBC Radio 5 Live, and presented a Sunday morning programme, Pienaar's Politics. He also hosted Question Time Extra Time (a radio supplement to BBC One's Question Time) alongside Stephen Nolan and served as a stand-in host on BBC Two's Daily Politics. From 2015 to 2020 he was the deputy political editor of BBC News.

Pienaar started presenting the drivetime programme on the new Times Radio station in June 2020.

== Personal life ==
Pienaar married Denise Walsh in 1980 and they had a son and a daughter. They divorced and Pienaar married Penny Davies, with whom he has two daughters.

Pienaar is a fan of Crystal Palace Football Club.

On 30 October 2025, on his Times Radio drivetime show, Pienaar spoke about recovering from cancer in 2024.

Media offices
Preceded by James Landale	Deputy Political Editor: BBC News; 2015–2020	Succeeded by Vicki Young
