= This Week (2003 TV programme) =

BBC Television current affairs and politics programme

- Andrew Neil presenting the show
- Genre: Current affairs, politics
- Presented by: Andrew Neil
- Starring: Michael Portillo; Alan Johnson; Miranda Green; Alex Salmond; Suzanne Evans; Diane Abbott; Liz Kendall; David Lammy
- Theme music composer: Jim Meacock
- Country of origin: United Kingdom
- Original language: English

Production
- Executive producer: Samir Shah
- Editor: Penny
- Running time: 45 minutes
- Production company: Juniper TV

Original release
- Network: BBC One
- Release: 16 January 2003 – 18 July 2019

Related
- Despatch Box; Brexitcast; Daily Politics; Politics Live

This Week is a British current affairs and politics TV programme. It was screened late on Thursday evenings on BBC One and hosted by former Sunday Times editor Andrew Neil, with a panel of two commentators, one from the right and the other from the left of the political spectrum. The show was introduced on 16 January 2003, as was the Daily Politics, after a major review of BBC political programmes. It replaced the nightly Despatch Box (1998–2002), for which Neil had been the sole presenter in its later years. In February 2019, following Neil's decision to step down as host, the BBC announced that This Week would end in July 2019.

The final episode aired on 18 July 2019, a live broadcast from Westminster Central Hall with an invited audience of political dignitaries and celebrities. Mick Hucknall of pop group Simply Red sang "Nobody Does It Better" to Neil and the "Final Show" was closed by "Quiet Man" covering "Make Luv". After September 2019, Neil went on to host The Andrew Neil Show on Wednesdays. This Week was initially replaced on Thursdays by the TV version of Brexitcast, a podcast about Brexit.

== Overview ==
Broadcast directly following Question Time, This Week presented itself as a more laid-back companion to its predecessor, with episodes regularly opening with a summary of the week's main events in the form of a parody of a popular television series. At the beginning of each episode, Neil asked the two regular commentators for their "Moment of the Week", occasionally contributing his own "moment". The standard format consisted of three segments, with a guest contributor featuring in each. The first featured a journalist or commentator who presented their "Take of the Week" in a short film before appearing in the studio to discuss their perspective further. The second segment was a light-hearted "Round-up of the Week" in and around Parliament, formerly presented by Mark Mardell, who left the show on becoming the BBC's Europe Editor in 2005. The "Round-up" segment was later presented by a rotation of writers and broadcasters. This was followed by a discussion between the hosts (often joined for this segment by Miranda Green) of the issues raised. The third main segment, "Spotlight", typically focused more on cultural topics and featured a final guest. For many years, there was often also a quiz at the end of the show, in which Neil took pleasure in demonstrating the commentators' ignorance of a range of topics, though this feature was dropped in later years.

With a light-hearted tone compared with most political programming, This Week was "punchy, irreverent, satirical". Originally, the former MP Michael Portillo was the regular Conservative commentator on the show, and the Labour commentator until 2010 was the sitting MP Diane Abbott. The two were ostensibly an "odd couple" coming from different sides of the political spectrum (albeit with a long-standing friendship dating back to when both attended grammar school in Harrow and appeared in a production of Macbeth together). During her unsuccessful campaign in 2010 to lead the Labour Party and her subsequent tenure as Shadow Minister for Public Health, Abbott began making only occasional appearances, her inability to speak without constraint becoming noticeable. Eventually, her place was taken by another Labour MP, in rotation each week, always a backbencher, most often Alan Johnson. After returning to the backbenches in 2013, Abbott appeared on a fortnightly basis, alternating with Johnson. Following her appointment to Jeremy Corbyn's shadow cabinet in September 2015, she did not reappear, though the tradition of Labour MPs alternating in the spot continued.

Though primarily a political discussion programme, This Week achieved notoriety for its humorous approach to current affairs. For example, during the run-up to the 2005 general election, the show's title sequence spoofed the recently re-released version of "Is This the Way to Amarillo" and its video featuring comedian Peter Kay. In 2011, following the announcement that the techno band Underworld were to perform at the opening ceremony for the London Summer Olympics, the show's ending credits featured Neil and his guests raving to the band's music.

In 2006, the programme won the Hansard Society Award for Opening Up Politics which was awarded at the Channel 4 Political Awards ceremony.

During the general election campaign of 2010, This Week was broadcast on Monday nights in addition to its usual Thursday night slot, with contributors including Sarah Teather, Lynne Featherstone, Caroline Flint, James Purnell, and Charles Kennedy. Since 2013, Neil's golden retriever Miss Molly also frequently appeared on the show, often walking in front of the camera during shots or sleeping next to guests.

This Week was often spoofed on the BBC Radio 4 comedy show Dead Ringers, where Andrew Neil interviewed Diane Abbott and then Labour leader Jeremy Corbyn often appeared.

== Recurring jokes ==
In keeping with its comic style, This Week had several recurring jokes and nicknames. These included assertions that the show's viewers watched the show drinking Blue Nun, David Cameron watched the show in bed wearing his pyjamas, and that the cast regularly went to a nightclub after filming was completed, either Annabel's in Berkeley Square or Lou Lou's in Mayfair (with Charles Clarke providing a minicab service to the guests, even when he was not appearing on the show). It was also frequently said that the show had a budget of almost zero, and had few or no regular viewers. While giving out the Twitter and Facebook handles for the show (in the process, creatively mangling the names of the social media sites), Neil also insisted that no comments posted by viewers would be read. In addition, every episode began with the words "Evenin' all" and ended with "That's your lot for this week" followed by "Nighty-night; don't let the [topical event or person] bite". The middle section was introduced with "Now, it's late; [topical event]-late." Following Diane Abbott's departure from the show, Neil would joke that her leadership bid and later appointment as Shadow Minister for Public Health were part of her "insatiable lust for power". Whenever she subsequently made an appearance on the show, Neil introduced her by saying "And back by absolutely no public demand whatsoever...". In weeks where the Speaker of the House of Commons, John Bercow (or his spouse), had featured in the news, the end credits were frequently shown over a scene of the diminutive Speaker being ceremonially escorted into the House of Commons to the music and lyrics of Jimmy Dean's "Big Bad John".

=== Guest commentators' nicknames ===
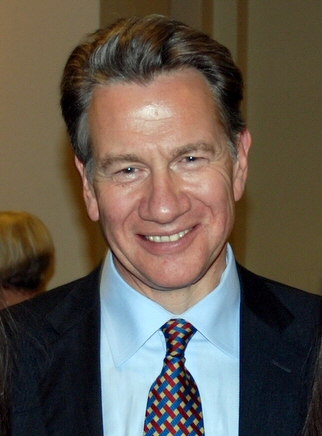
Michael Portillo, regularly mocked by Andrew Neil for his garishly-designed shirts and his long-running railway series

- "Itchy & Scratchy" – Diane Abbott and Michael Portillo
- "#Choo-Choo" & "#SadManOnATrain" – Michael Portillo
- "#baffled & #HackneyAbbott" – Diane Abbott
- "#SadManOnTheLeft" – Alan Johnson
- "#ShesLovely" - Miranda Green
- "#ManInTheMiddle" or "Chat-Show Charlie" – the late Charles Kennedy
- "#RivieraGigolo" – Alastair Campbell
- "#FourPerCent" & "Liz Misérables" – Liz Kendall
- "#DivisionBelle" – Caroline Flint
- "#theLamminator" – David Lammy
- "#LastKingofScotland" – Alex Salmond
- "Vince the Cable" – Vince Cable
- "Shirl the Girl" – The Baroness Williams of Crosby
- "#SadManinaSuit" – Jacob Rees-Mogg
- "#JessWeCan" – Jess Phillips
- "#SadScouserOnaSofa" – Esther McVey
- "#SmoothOperator" – Chuka Umunna
- "#NorthernSoul" – Lisa Nandy
- "#MaroonedCamerooned" – Ed Vaizey
- "#minesavindaloo" – Michael Dugher
- "#glitterballs" – Ed Balls
- "#OhItsNotEdBalls" – Chris Leslie
- "#littlepinkbus" – Harriet Harman
- "Molly the dog" – Molly Neil (Andrew Neil's dog)
- "Scrubber" – Iris Bailey (Andrew Neil's dog)

=== Other political nicknames ===
- "BoJo The Clown" – Boris Johnson, Prime Minister 2019–22
- "The Maybot" – Theresa May, Prime Minister 2016–19
- "Call Me Dave" – David Cameron, Prime Minister 2010–16
- "Nick Cleggover", "#NickFlixandChill" – Nick Clegg, Deputy Prime Minister 2010–15
- "Spreadsheet Phil" – Philip Hammond, Chancellor 2016–19
- "Boy George" – George Osborne, Chancellor 2010–16
- "Not-So-Red Ed" – Ed Miliband, Labour Party leader 2010–15
- "Her Maj" or "The Boss" – Queen Elizabeth II
- "The Great Leader" – Gordon Brown, Prime Minister 2007–10
- "Our Dear Leader" – BBC Directors-General: Mark Thompson, 2004-2012; Lord Hall of Birkenhead, 2013–2019
- "Miss Trust" – BBC Trust
- Jean-Claude "Mine's a triple Cognac, high five" Juncker – Jean-Claude Juncker, President of the European Commission 2014–19
- "Bish" – Archbishop of Canterbury
- "Jezza the Red" – Jeremy Corbyn, Labour Party leader 2015–20
- "The Donald" – Donald Trump, President of the United States 2017–21

=== Election song ===
During general elections, the show started with the "election song". The 2005 election song was "Is this the way to Election Day?" (a spoof of "(Is This the Way to) Amarillo" by Neil Sedaka and Howard Greenfield), and for the 2010 election, the song was "We're Off to Find a PM" (a spoof of "We're Off to See the Wizard" by Harold Arlen).
