= BBC Politics Live =

British political television programme

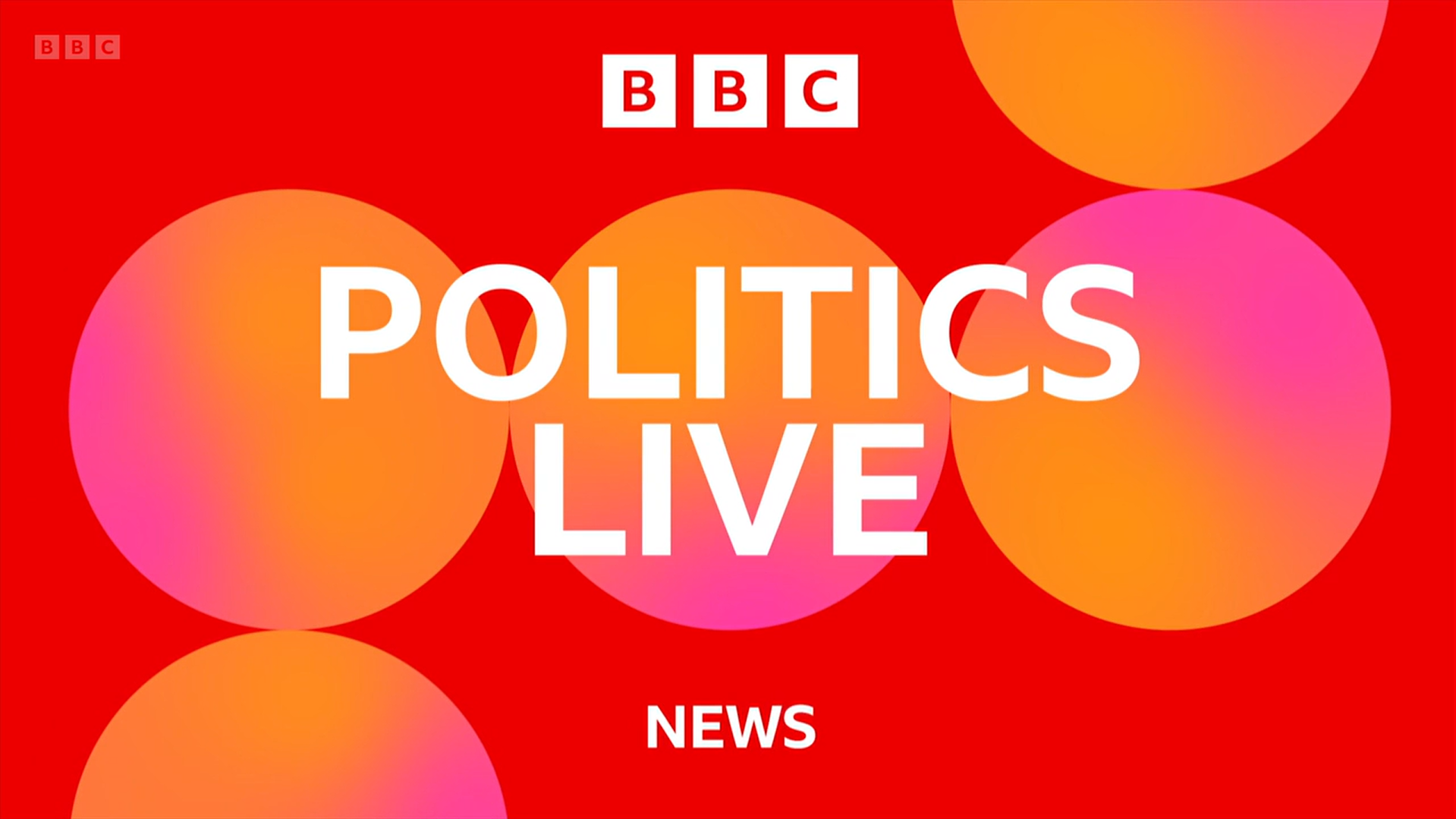
- Genre: Politics; Current affairs
- Presented by: Vicki Young (2025–present); Jo Coburn (2018–2025); Andrew Neil (2018–2020)
- Country of origin: United Kingdom
- Original language: English

Production
- Production locations: BBC Millbank (Monday–Thursday); Palace of Westminster (Wednesday for PMQs)
- Running time: 45–105 minutes

Original release
- Network: BBC Two; BBC News
- Release: 3 September 2018 – present

Related
- Daily Politics; Westminster Live; This Week; The Andrew Neil Show; Politics Show; Despatch Box; Politics England

BBC Politics Live (often known simply as Politics Live) is a weekday BBC News lunchtime political programme which launched on 3 September 2018. It broadcasts when the Parliament is in session and during the three-week party conference season.

The 45-minute programme is presented by Vicki Young and features at least four guests debating the political stories of the day alongside reports and other content. The Wednesday edition is extended by an hour - coming on air at 11.15am, as opposed to 12.15pm, to carry live coverage of Prime Minister's Questions. much of the Wednesday edition is simulcasted on BBC News as UK opt-out of the main BBC News Channel. The Friday edition broadcasts highlights from proceedings from the UK Parliament, the Scottish Parliament, the Senedd and the Northern Ireland Assembly and is called Politics UK. And during the party conference season, special additional editions are aired to provide live coverage of the leader's speeches. These editions can air at other times of the day, depending on the timing of those leadership speeches.

== History ==
BBC Politics Live was first announced on 12 July 2018 in a statement from the BBC's press office. as the BBC's new lunchtime political programme. The series replaced Daily Politics which ran in the same time-slot for the previous 15 years and was presented by Jo Coburn and Andrew Neil. In the announcement, the BBC stated that the new series "will offer viewers a fast-moving, conversational show, featuring a blend of political interviews, discussion and video content designed to be shared digitally, ensuring BBC Politics Live connects with the lives of people around the country."

In March 2020, BBC Politics Live broadcasts was suspended by the BBC, owing to the COVID-19 pandemic. Although PMQ's restarted, BBC Politics Live did not as Coburn anchored PMQ's for BBC Newsroom Live, directly from the Commons lobby in Westminster for BBC News which was on air during the pandemic. BBC Politics Live resumed in May 2020 on Wednesdays only with Coburn hosting with guests at home or in the studio two meters away from each other because of UK lockdown rules. After the summer recess, the BBC changed their programming plan by scaling down BBC Politics Live to 4 days a week (Monday to Thursday with the same times as before), with a review programme, BBC Politics UK airing in the timeslot on Fridays.

Since the start of 2023, most of the Wednesday edition of BBC Politics Live is simulcasted on BBC News.

In March 2025, it was announced that Jo Coburn would step down as presenter of BBC Politics Live from May 2025. On 4 April 2025, the BBC announced appointment of Vicki Young as the new presenter of Politics Live.

On 22 September 2025, BBC Politics Live premiered a new logo, opening titles and a revamped studio, located within the BBC's Millbank centre in Westminster.

== Special broadcasts ==
- Monday 14 January 2019 — A special programme ahead of a vote on Theresa May's Brexit deal.
- Tuesday 15 January 2019 — A special programme during and after a vote on Theresa May's Brexit deal.
- Wednesday 16 and Thursday 17 January 2019 – A special programme after a vote of no confidence in Theresa May's government.
- Friday 24 May 2019 – A special programme after Theresa May's resignation statement in Downing Street.
- Monday 22 July 2019 – A special programme concerning the Liberal Democrat hustings.
- Wednesday 3 March 2021 – A special 3 hours 45 minute special covering the 2021 budget by Chancellor Rishi Sunak.
- Friday 23 September 2022 – A special programme after covering the September 2022 mini-budget by Chancellor Kwasi Kwarteng.
- Friday 5 May 2023 – A special programme to cover local elections.

== Journalists ==
- Jonathan Blake, Political Correspondent
- Nick Eardley, Chief Political Correspondent
- Chris Mason, Political Editor (appears on Wednesdays for PMQs)
- Vicki Young, Deputy Political Editor

=== Previous journalists ===
- John Pienaar, Deputy Political Editor
- Laura Kuenssberg, Political Editor
- Adam Fleming, Chief Political Correspondent

== See also ==
- This Week
