= The Andrew Marr Show =

2005–2021 British TV series

- Also known as: Sunday AM (2005–2007); Sunday Morning
- Genre: Politics
- Presented by: Andrew Marr
- Theme music composer: Debbie Wiseman
- Country of origin: United Kingdom
- Original language: English

Production
- Production locations: Studio 54D, New Broadcasting House, London
- Running time: 60 minutes

Original release
- Network: BBC One
- Release: 11 September 2005 – 19 December 2021

Related
- Breakfast with Frost; Sunday with Laura Kuenssberg

The Andrew Marr Show is a Sunday morning talk show which was presented by Andrew Marr. It was broadcast on BBC One from 2005 to 2021.

The programme replaced the long-running Breakfast with Frost as the network's flagship Sunday talk show when David Frost decided to retire. Originally launched as Sunday AM, it was renamed The Andrew Marr Show in September 2007 when the show returned after its summer break. Marr interviewed political figures and others involved in the current events of the week in every episode. The programme begins with a review of the Sunday papers, for which Marr is joined by two or three different guests. It also featured BBC News and BBC Weather updates. The programme shared a studio with Sunday Politics, Newsnight and HARDtalk, BBC World News, GMT, Impact, Global and Focus on Africa. Following Marr's departure from the BBC in 2021, the show was broadcast under the temporary title Sunday Morning, aired from 9 January 2022 to 17 July 2022.

Editors included Rob Burley and founding editor Barney Jones, whose last show was on 18 January 2015. Between 2005 and 2015, the programme's title sequence was a pastiche of the television series The Prisoner. The programme was recorded at New Broadcasting House after September 2012.

The programme aired for the final time on 19 December 2021, and was replaced by Sunday with Laura Kuenssberg, which began airing on 4 September 2022.

== Guests ==
The Andrew Marr Show usually featured one Cabinet-level UK minister, a representative from the Opposition, one big-name, non-political guest and two or three celebrities or journalists to review the Sunday papers. A guest live music act closed the programme.

Notable interviewees included: Dmitry Medvedev (then President of Russia), Morgan Tsvangirai (then Prime Minister of Zimbabwe), Tony Hayward (then CEO of BP), Anthony Hopkins, Nicole Kidman, Russell Crowe, Ban Ki-moon (UN Secretary-General), Michael Caine, Kevin Rudd (then Prime Minister of Australia), David Cameron, Theresa May and Boris Johnson.

Musical guests included: Tom Jones, Sting, Jay-Z, Snow Patrol, George Ezra, James Bay, Rag 'n' Bone Man, Sir Ray Davies, Marc Almond, Jools Holland, Florence and the Machine, Lulu, Boy George, and Sir Elton John.

Marr reviewing the papers with Armando Iannucci and Janine di Giovanni in December 2009

== Guest presenters ==
=== Summer replacement ===
Guest presenters hosted the programme through July and it was replaced in August by BBC News at Nine.

Guest presenters included: Zeinab Badawi, Sophie Raworth, Fiona Bruce, Stephanie Flanders, Huw Edwards, Martha Kearney, Emily Maitlis, James Landale and Jeremy Vine.

=== 2013 guest presenters ===
In January 2013, Marr suffered a stroke and was replaced by guest presenters. Marr appeared as a guest on the show on 14 April to speak about Margaret Thatcher's legacy, and spoke about the incident and his recovery. Paralysis of the left side of his body was evident, but his speech was unaffected, and he expressed determination to return to the presenter's role. Marr conducted pre-recorded interviews with David Miliband and David Cameron for the editions of 14 and 21 July respectively, and returned to the main presenter's role after the series' summer break in September.

From January until June, there was no fixed cover presenter. The guest presenters who appeared included Jeremy Vine, Sophie Raworth, James Landale, Eddie Mair, Sian Williams, Susanna Reid and Nick Robinson. From 9 June, Vine and Raworth became the regular presenters and began to alternate presenting duties each week. Vine presented the final programme before Marr's return on 28 July, confirming Marr's return for the new series on 1 September. Vine sat in again on 15 December due to family commitments.

== Controversies ==
=== Gordon Brown health claims ===
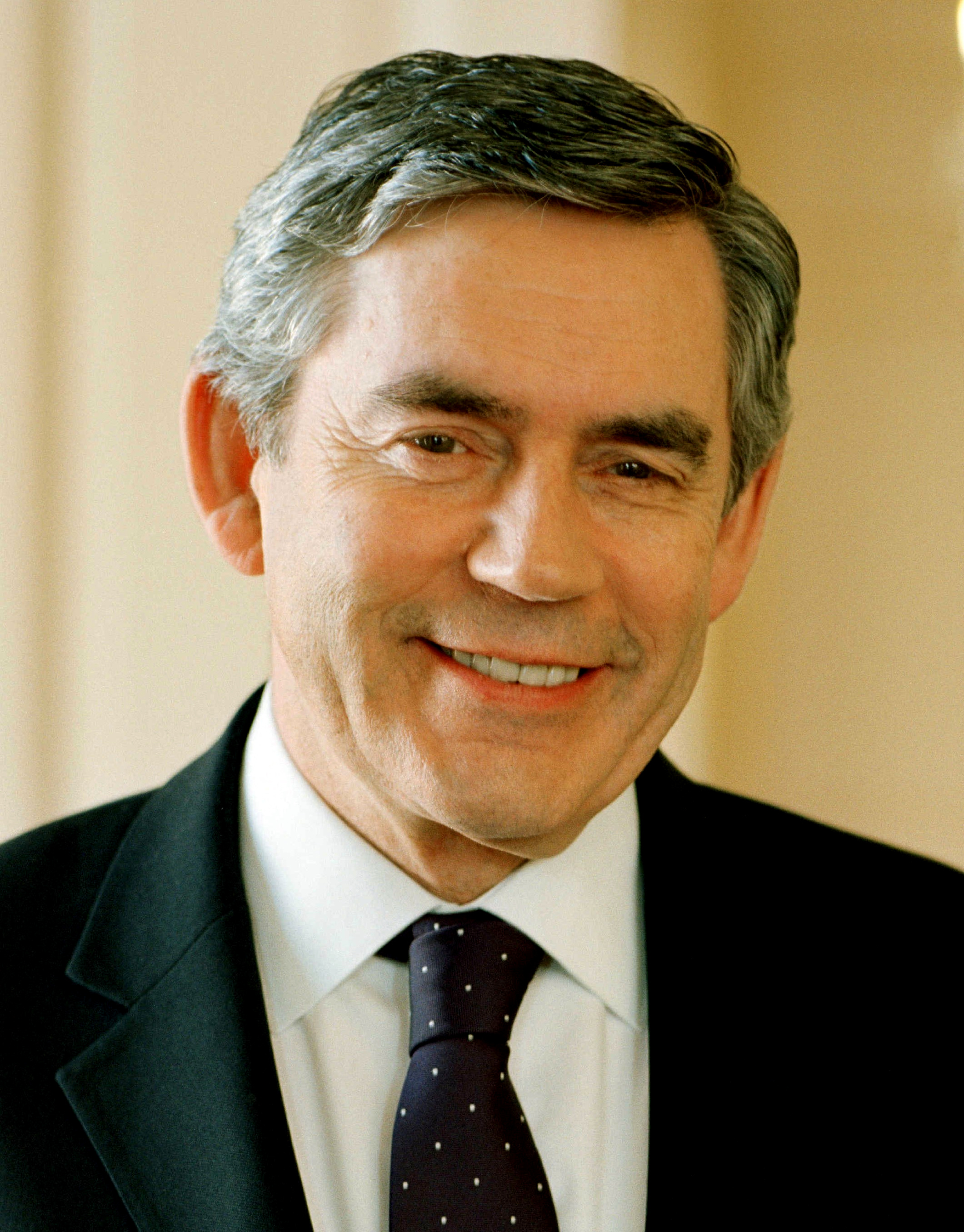
Former Prime Minister Gordon Brown

In September 2009 the BBC received hundreds of complaints over the questioning of Prime Minister Gordon Brown, after Marr questioned Brown on the health of his eyes, and whether he used prescription painkillers, during a long and wide-ranging interview. Marr asked the question: "A lot of people in this country use prescription painkillers and pills to help them get through. Are you one of them?" Brown replied: "No. I think this is the sort of questioning which is all too often entering the lexicon of British politics."

Public figures and politicians had a range of views on the line of questioning. Ben Bradshaw and Peter Mandelson, both members of Brown's Cabinet, criticised the questioning, with Mandelson saying it showed "personal intrusiveness" and alleged the question was based on false rumours being spread by "extreme right wing" bloggers. Others took a different line – historian David Starkey told Question Time "we have a right to know" adding that Brown's recent behaviour had "suggest[ed] this is a man not completely in control", and former Home Secretary Charles Clarke suggested that Brown's health might have been a reason for the Prime Minister to stand down and that within the context of a long interview, it was reasonable also to ask Mr Brown about his health. The editor of the show, Barney Jones, defended the questioning in October 2009, saying:

"We felt that with a general election looming and with former and current cabinet ministers warning of electoral defeat unless the party turned round its current position, a robust interview centred on the economy and the Prime Minister's leadership was appropriate. The former Home Secretary, Charles Clarke, suggested this month that health might be a reason for the Prime Minister to stand down and within the context of a long interview about policy it was reasonable also to ask Mr Brown about his health. The issue of his health and whether it affects his ability to perform the onerous job of leading the party and the country was pertinent, and has been raised with other Prime Ministers in the past."

Marr himself, appearing at the Leveson Inquiry in May 2012, defending the question as "reasonable", but also regretted asking it, because it dominated newspaper headlines rather than the more serious policy points covered in the interview. Marr said: "I felt we got a lot out of that interview, with some important concessions made on the economy and other things. But the headlines were all about the pills question. It wasn’t worth it." Asked if that meant he did not feel the question itself was inappropriate, he answered: "Correct." Marr also noted that Brown did not seem annoyed by the question after the interview had ended, and that it was only "after about an hour" that he realised he had caused an incident.

=== 2013 Boris Johnson interview ===
During Marr's absence from the programme, on 24 March 2013, guest presenter Eddie Mair interviewed the Mayor of London Boris Johnson, asking critical questions about Johnson's known past misdeeds – the subject of a forthcoming BBC documentary by Michael Cockerell – including lying to Michael Howard, his party leader, and offering to supply the name of a journalist to a friend who wanted to beat him up, Mair concluded his line of questioning with: "aren't you in fact – making up quotes, lying to your party leader, wanting to be part of someone being physically assaulted – you're a nasty piece of work, aren't you?"

Patrick Wintour, political editor of The Guardian commented that Johnson's "reputation" took "a severe pounding", while The Daily Telegraph blogger Dan Hodges said Mair's approach was a "disgrace". Johnson himself said that Mair had done a "splendid job". Johnson biographer and ConservativeHome contributing editor Andrew Gimson said the interview would have "very little [impact], I think it's a storm in a teacup actually" and that "people already knew what kind of a guy he was, and those who liked him will go on liking him".

=== 2018 Penny Mordaunt interview ===
On 11 February 2018, Marr interviewed the Secretary of State for International Development Penny Mordaunt. Following the interview, when he believed he was off air, Marr could be heard praising Mordaunt, saying "that was very good" to her in the tone of a whisper. He received criticism for his remarks on social media and was accused of being partial towards the Conservative Party. Rob Burley, the editor of the show, later defended Marr, saying he was "being polite" to Mordaunt.

=== 2019 Priti Patel interview ===
On 13 October 2019, during an interview about Brexit with Home Secretary Priti Patel, Marr was reading out a list of industry bodies which had expressed concern about the impact Brexit would have on their businesses, and accused Patel of "laughing", in an apparent response to her facial expression. The BBC received 222 complaints and accepted that Patel was not "smiling" but displaying her "natural expression" in their apology.

== Reception ==
=== Viewing figures ===
The Andrew Marr Show averaged around two million viewers an episode, representing a 30% audience share.

=== Rivalry with Sophy Ridge on Sunday ===
Since its inception until August 2018 the programme was broadcast at 9 am. That month the timeslot was changed to 10 am, in direct competition with rival Sophy Ridge on Sunday on Sky News. The latter show changed to 9 am soon after. The news of the move was broken by a tweet by Andrew Marr to Sophy Ridge, apparently made by accident. It was quickly deleted.

In August 2019 it was announced that The Andrew Marr Show was moving back to 9 am, again in direct competition with Ridge after a year-long "experiment". Sky News immediately announced that Ridge would move to 8:30 am.
