= Sonia Sodha =

British newspaper columnist

- Born: Sonia Priya Sodha; June 1981 (age 44)
- Education: St Hilda's College, Oxford
- Occupations: Columnist, author

Sonia Priya Sodha (born June 1981) is a British columnist, author and broadcaster. She has written for The Guardian, The Observer and The Times. She was a senior adviser to Ed Miliband when he was Leader of the Opposition. She has appeared regularly on ITV's This Morning since 2022.

== Life and career ==
Sonia Priya Sodha was born in June 1981. She describes herself as a "half-Hindu, half-Sikh Indian". She went to a private school, followed by St Hilda's College, Oxford, where she took a BA (Hons) in PPE and an MPhil in politics.

During her time at Oxford, Sodha served as the president of the Oxford University Liberal Democrats in the Hilary term of 2001.

She worked for the Social Market Foundation and the Race Equality Unit at the Home Office before joining the Institute for Public Policy Research (IPPR) as a research assistant, later becoming a research fellow. She later moved to become Head of the Capabilities Programme at Demos, where she led work in areas including education and public services, and became Head of Policy and Strategy at the Dartington Social Research Unit.

She was a senior adviser to Ed Miliband when he was Leader of the Opposition. Later, when Sodha was head of public services at Which?, she was reported by The Times to have influenced Miliband's policy of breaking up large banks and requiring them to sell branches to stimulate competition. Sodha was engaged as the chief leader writer at The Observer and deputy opinion editor at The Guardian until the sale of the Observer to Tortoise Media and remains a columnist at The Guardian. She has made appearances on television and radio shows including the Sky News newspaper review, Today, and Question Time, and has presented BBC Radio 4 documentaries on topics including multiculturalism and deliberative democracy.

Sodha served as a trustee of City Year UK, a charity that supports role models to help students from disadvantaged communities, and of Trust for London, a charity addressing poverty and equality.

Since 2022, Sodha appears regularly on ITVs This Morning as contributor to news-related subjects.

== Publications ==
Year	Title	Authors	Publisher	ISBN
2006	Housing wealth : first timers to old timers	Dominic Maxwell and Sonia Sodha	IPPR	9781860302985
2006	The saving gateway : from principles to practice	Sonia Sodha and Ruth Lister	IPPR	9781860303043
2007	Moving on up: Progression in the Labour Market (Note: Chapter in Politics for a New Generation)	Natascha Engel, Sonia Sodha and Mike Johnson	IPPR	9780230524934
2008	Thursday's Child	Sonia Sodha and Ruth Lister	IPPR	9781860303180
2009	Service nation	Sonia Sodha and Dan Leighton	Demos	9781906693275
2010	Ex curricula	Sonia Sodha and Julia Margo	Demos	9781906693343
