= Andrew Rawnsley =

British journalist

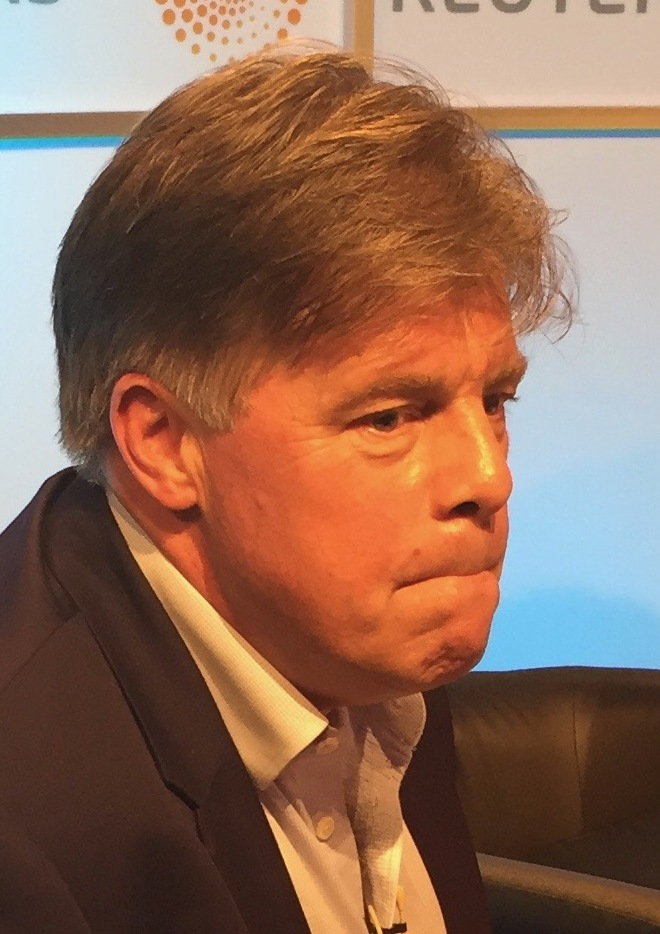
- Rawnsley in 2017
- Born: Andrew Nicholas James Rawnsley; 5 January 1962 (age 64); Leeds, United Kingdom
- Education: Sidney Sussex College, Cambridge
- Occupations: Journalist, broadcaster
- Spouse: Jane Hall
- Children: 3

Andrew Nicholas James Rawnsley (born 5 January 1962) is a British political journalist and broadcaster. A columnist and chief political commentator for The Observer, he has written two books on New Labour.

== Early life ==
Rawnsley was born in Leeds. He was educated at Lawrence Sheriff School in Rugby and later on a scholarship at Rugby School and read history at Sidney Sussex College, Cambridge, gaining a first-class Honours degree. He was a columnist for the newsletter of the Cambridge University Social Democrats during 1982–83. He was also editor of Stop Press, the Cambridge University newspaper of the day, and won the Guardian Student Journalist of the year award in 1984.

== Career ==
=== Newspapers ===
Rawnsley began his career at the BBC, working there for two years from 1983, then joined The Guardian in 1985. From 1987 he was the newspaper's parliamentary sketch writer. In 1993 he moved to The Observer as chief political commentator and associate editor, a position he retains.

He has won several awards for his journalism, including: British Press Awards Young Journalist of the Year (1987); What The Papers Say Columnist of the Year (2000); Channel 4 Political Awards Book of the Year (2001); Channel 4 Political Awards Journalist of the Year (2003); House Magazine Awards Commentator of the Year (2008); and the Chair's Choice Award at the Editorial Intelligence Comment Awards (2015) for combining "excellent insight with an originality and power of expression which makes him sans pareil in his field".

=== Radio and television ===
Rawnsley has also broadcast regularly; he was co-presenter of Channel 4's A Week in Politics with Vincent Hanna. He continues to be the writer-presenter of one-off documentaries for Channel 4. He made Bye Bye Blues, a three part series about John Major's Government, in 1997. That was followed by Blair's Year (1998). His three-hour series The Rise And Fall of Tony Blair (2007) was long-listed for a BAFTA award. Rawnsley has written and presented a series of programmes on British politics, broadcast on Channel 4's current affairs series, Dispatches: Gordon Brown: Where Did It All Go Wrong? (2008), which was nominated for an award at Banff World Television Festival; Crash Gordon: The Inside Story of the Financial Crisis (2009); Cameron Uncovered (2010); and A Year Inside Number Ten (2011).

He was the founding and sole presenter of BBC Radio Four's The Westminster Hour from 1998 to September 2006. He was succeeded by Carolyn Quinn when he moved to the ITV network for a new programme, The Sunday Edition, with Andrea Catherwood, a series which began on Sunday 17 September 2006. Since 2011, he has presented BBC Radio Four's "Leader Conference".

=== Books ===
Rawnsley's Servants of the People: The Inside Story of New Labour, published on 27 September 2000, is an account of the early years of New Labour in government. The book raised the profile of the feud between Tony Blair and Gordon Brown. An expanded paperback edition, including coverage of the 2001 general election, was published on 16 July 2001.

Rawnsley's The End of the Party: The Rise and Fall of New Labour was serialised in The Observer starting on 21 February 2010 and published in book form on 1 March 2010. An expanded paperback edition, taking the story up to the day of Gordon Brown's resignation after the 2010 general election, was published on 30 September 2010.

== Personal life ==
In 1990 he married Jane Hall in Cambridge. They have three daughters: Olivia, Jessica, and Cordelia.

Rawnsley became a Fellow of the Royal Society of Arts in 2001.
