= Jonathan Dimbleby (TV series) =

- Genre: Politics
- Presented by: Jonathan Dimbleby
- Country of origin: United Kingdom
- Original language: English
- No. of episodes: 361

Production
- Producers: London Weekend Television (1994–2004); Granada Productions (2004–2006)
- Running time: 44 minutes (exc. adverts)

Original release
- Network: ITV
- Release: 9 April 1994 – 7 May 2006

Related
- ITV News; The Sunday Edition

Jonathan Dimbleby was a British Sunday lunchtime political discussion programme which aired on ITV from 1994 to 2006, and was produced by London Weekend Television (branded as Granada Productions from 2004 until 15 January 2006 and ITV Productions from 22 January to 7 May 2006). It was presented by Jonathan Dimbleby, who also anchored the political coverage of ITV News during his time with the network. The show's theme song was composed by Francis Monkman.

The episodes (until the show's ended on 7 May 2006) typically begin with an ITV News Summary at the beginning and end of the programme.

For much of its run, the programme came from The London Studios and featured a studio audience, who would be given the opportunity to become involved in the discussion. Towards the end of its run, the programme was produced on a smaller budget and came from a studio in Millbank without a studio audience.
