= Timeline of television news in the United Kingdom =

This is a timeline of the history of television news in the UK.

== 1930s ==
- 1936
  - 2 November – The BBC opens the world's first regular high-definition television service from Alexandra Palace. Television news coverage consists of cinema newsreels from British Movietone News and sound-only news bulletins from BBC Radio.
- 1937
  - 12 May – First use of a TV outside-broadcast van to cover the procession that followed the coronation of King George VI and Queen Elizabeth.
- 1938
  - No events.
- 1939
  - 1 September – The BBC Television Service is suspended, owing to the imminent outbreak of the Second World War.

== 1940s ==
- 1940 to 1945
  - Television is closed for the duration of the Second World War..
- 1946
  - 7 June – BBC Television broadcasts resume.
  - BBC Radio bulletins start being simulcast on television with a still picture of Big Ben.
- 1947
  - 9 November – The first use of telerecording of an outside broadcast, the Service of Remembrance from the Cenotaph is televised live and a telerecording shown that evening.
  - 20 November – The wedding of Princess Elizabeth and Philip Mountbatten, Duke of Edinburgh is televised by the BBC. It is watched by an estimated 400,000 viewers.
- 1948
  - 5 January – The first edition of Television Newsreel is broadcast. The weeknight programme, broadcast at 7:30pm runs for fifteen minutes.
- 1949
  - No events.

== 1950s ==
- 1950
  - 23 April – The first edition of Children's Newsreel is broadcast.
- 1951
  - A Sunday version of Television Newsreel, Newsreel Review of the Week is launched.
- 1952
  - No events.
- 1953
  - 2 June – The coronation of Queen Elizabeth II in Westminster Abbey is televised by the BBC and watched live by an estimated audience of 20 million people in the United Kingdom.
- 1954
  - 5 July – BBC newsreader Richard Baker reads the first televised BBC News bulletin. The new bulletin replaces Television Newsreel.
- 1955
  - January – A consortium of the initial four Independent Television broadcasting companies launch ITN which will provide ITV with its news service.
  - 22 September – The first ITN news bulletin is broadcast at 10pm on ITV's launch night.
  - September – Kenneth Kendall becomes the first in-vision newsreader.
- 1956
  - No events.
- 1957
  - 18 February – The first episode of Tonight is broadcast.
  - 30 August – BBC Scotland launches a weekday five-minute news bulletin and a Saturday teatime sports round-up. They launch one day before the start of broadcasting by Scottish Television which provided its own regional news service from the outset.
  - September – The first broadcasts of regional news bulletins on the BBC take place and bulletins also start being broadcast in Wales and Northern Ireland.
- 1958
  - No events.
- 1959
  - The BBC North East and Cumbria region is created with localised bulletins from Newcastle-upon-Tyne aired for the first time. Previously, the area was part of a pan-Northern region based in Manchester.

== 1960s ==
- 1960
  - No events.
- 1961
  - September – The final edition of Children's Newsreel is broadcast.
- 1962
  - 17 September – BBC Wales launches Wales Today. The programme is seen by viewers in both Wales and the west of England until February 1964 when the BBC Wales and BBC West regions are created.
- 1963
  - 22 November – Regular programming is interrupted to report on the assassination of John F. Kennedy.
- 1964
  - 20 April – BBC2 beings broadcasting and BBC News launches a new news programme for the channel called Newsroom.
  - 26 April – Another new news programme for BBC2 is launched. Called News Review, the programme is a summary of the week's news with subtitles for the deaf and hard-of-hearing.
- 1965
  - 18 June – The last edition of Tonight is broadcast on BBC1.
- 1966
  - 5 April – The Money Programme debuts on BBC2. It continued to air until 2010.
- 1967
  - 3 July – News at Ten is launched as a 13-week trial of a nightly 30-minute bulletin. The programme is an immediate success with the audience and is soon made permanent.
- 1968
  - 7 March – Newsroom on BBC2 becomes the first UK news programme to be transmitted in colour.
  - 25 March – BBC regional television from Leeds begins and the first edition of Look North is broadcast. Previously, the Yorkshire area had been part of a wider North region based in Manchester.
  - 1 April – The first edition of BBC Scotland's Reporting Scotland is broadcast.
- 1969
  - No events.

== 1970s ==
- 1970
  - 14 September – Robert Dougall presents the first edition of the BBC Nine O'Clock News. The programme was launched in response to ITN's News at Ten.
- 1971
  - No events.
- 1972
  - 4 April – The first edition of Newsround is broadcast. Presented by John Craven.
  - 1 October – LWT launches the UK's first Sunday politics programme Weekend World.
  - 16 October – Following a law change which removed all restrictions on broadcasting hours, ITV is able to launch an afternoon service. As part of the new service ITV's first lunchtime news programme, First Report, is shown.
  - 29 December – The final edition of BBC2's news programme Newsroom is broadcast. It is replaced by a five-minute news summary.
- 1973
  - 2 January – A new late evening extended news bulletin News Extra begins broadcasting on BBC2.
- 1974
  - 7 January – A two-minute mid-afternoon regional news summary is broadcast on BBC1 for the first time. It is transmitted immediately before the start of the afternoon's children's programmes.
  - 23 September – The BBC's Teletext service Ceefax goes live.
- 1975
  - 1 September –
    - Tonight returns to BBC1 after ten years off air. The new programme airs as a late evening news and analysis programme.
    - BBC2's late evening news bulletin is renamed Newsnight.
- 1976
  - 6 September – News at One replaces First Report and the teatime news bulletin programme is extended by five minutes and renamed News at 5.45.
  - 17 September – The original incarnation of Newsnight is broadcast for the final time. It is replaced three days later with a shorter bulletin called Late Night News on 2.
- 1977
  - No events.
- 1978
  - ITV's teletext service ORACLE launches and as with the BBC's service, news is at the forefront of the new service.
- 1979
  - 5 July – The final edition of Tonight is broadcast on BBC1.
  - 25 September – The first edition of Question Time is broadcast on BBC1.

== 1980s ==
- 1980
  - 28 January – Newsnight is launched on BBC2.
  - March – The very first in-vision Ceefax transmissions are broadcast. News pages are included as part of the sequence of pages shown in each Ceefax transmission.
- 1981
  - 29 July – The Wedding of Charles, Prince of Wales and Lady Diana Spencer is produced by BBC Television & Radio with an audience of 750 million viewers and listeners in over 60 countries.
  - 4 September – The final edition of the Midday News is broadcast.
  - 7 September – News After Noon is launched on BBC1 as a 30-minute lunchtime news programme.
- 1982
  - BBC News and ITN provide extensive coverage of the Falklands War with newsflashes supplemented by additional and extended news bulletins.
  - 1 November – The first edition of Welsh-language news bulletin Newyddion is broadcast on the first night of broadcasting of Wales' new fourth channel S4C.
  - 2 November – On the day of the launch of Channel 4, Channel 4 News is broadcast for the first time. The ITN-produced 60-minute programme is broadcast each weeknight at 7 pm with a brief news summary broadcast at weekends. However, the new channel's teletext service does not feature news pages, apart from a headlines page.
- 1983
  - 17 January – Breakfast Time, the UK's first national breakfast television service, is launched. News bulletins and summaries are broadcast every 30 minutes.
  - 1 February – ITV launches its breakfast service TV-am and again news is a major part of the output. TV-am produces its bulletins in-house.
  - 5 August – The final edition of Nationwide is broadcast.
  - 24 October – Sixty Minutes launches as the new evening news programme to replace Nationwide.
- 1984
  - 27 July – The final edition of Sixty Minutes is broadcast.
  - 3 September – BBC1's teatime news hour is relaunched and now runs from 6 pm until 7 pm. A new 30-minute long news programme the Six O'Clock News is launched and this is followed by a longer regional news magazine, which is expanded to 25 minutes.
  - 18 November – The BBC launches its first Sunday lunchtime political interview show, called This Week, Next Week.
  - December – BBC1 stops broadcasting a late night news summary and BBC2 stops a late evening Saturday night news summary, meaning that the channel now only broadcasts a single 15-minute news and sport bulletin on Saturdays.
- 1985
  - 23 January – Television coverage of proceedings in the House of Lords begins.
  - 30 August – The weekday lunchtime Financial Report, broadcast on BBC1 in London and the south east, is broadcast for the final time ahead of the launch of a lunchtime regional news bulletin for viewers in the BBC South East region.
  - 2 September – A regional news bulletin following the Nine O'Clock News is launched.
  - 22 December – Having been broadcast every Sunday teatime since the launch of BBC2 in 1964, News Review is broadcast for the final time.
- 1986
  - 4 January – The first edition of NewsView is broadcast on BBC2. The new Saturday early evening programme lasts 40 minutes and combines the day's news and sport with a look back at the week's news.
  - 8 May – Television and radio broadcasts coverage of the local elections for the first time. The BBC airs coverage until around 2.30am. ITV's coverage is not a networked ITN special but is instead produced by individual companies.
  - 9 June – The BBC launches its first parliamentary highlights programme when the first edition of The Lords This Week (renamed The Week in the Lords later in 1986) is shown on BBC2.
  - 13 September – David Frost on Sunday launches on TV-am.
  - 17 October – BBC2 broadcasts a teatime news summary with subtitles for the last time. For the past three years this bulletin, which had been broadcast at around 5.25 pm, had been the first programme of the day (apart from educational programmes and sports coverage).
  - 24 October – The final edition of News After Noon is broadcast.
  - 27 October – BBC1 starts a full daytime television service. Among the new programmes is a new lunchtime news bulletin – the One O'Clock News. The programme continues to this day.
  - 10 November – Breakfast Time is relaunched with a more formal news and current affairs format.
  - 8 December – Six weeks after launching its daytime service, BBC TV starts broadcasting hourly news summaries. Morning bulletins are shown on BBC1 and early afternoon summaries (at 2 pm, 3 pm and 3:50 pm) are shown on BBC2. Each bulletin is followed by a weather forecast. This is the first time that hourly news bulletins have been broadcast on British television.
- 1987
  - ITN World News is launched as part of the launch of pan-European Super Channel.
  - 20 July – The lunchtime news programme moves to 12.30 pm and is renamed accordingly.
  - 7 September – ITV launches a full morning programme schedule, with advertising, for the first time. The new service includes regular five-minute national news bulletins.
  - 21 September – Channel 4 broadcasts the first edition of a weekday business and financial news programme Business Daily is broadcast.
- 1988
  - 15 February – An early morning 60-minute news programme – ITN Early Morning News – is launched but is only available in areas which have 24-hour broadcasting. The first 30 minutes of the programme includes a full broadcast of ITN's international news bulletin ITN World News. In addition, brief news summaries are broadcast at various points through the night.
  - 7 March – The lunchtime news returns to the 1 pm slot.
  - 18 September – On the Record replaces This Week Next Week as BBC1's Sunday lunchtime political discussion programme.
  - 31 October – For the first time, Newsnight is given a fixed starting time, of 10.30 pm.
  - The final edition of Weekend World is broadcast on ITV.
- 1989
  - 5 February – Sky Television launches at 6 pm and with it the launch of the UK's first rolling news channel Sky News.
  - 3 April – Channel 4 launches its breakfast service The Channel 4 Daily. Conceived as a television newspaper, output is based heavily on news and current affairs supplemented by a number of bite-sized feature segments lasting between 5 and 10 minutes which were slotted around the news output.
  - 29 September – The final edition of Breakfast Time is broadcast.
  - 2 October – The first edition of BBC Breakfast News is broadcast.
  - 21 November – Television coverage of proceedings in the House of Commons begins. The BBC broadcasts all of its Parliamentary programming on BBC2. This includes live coverage of Prime Ministers Questions and late night and breakfast round-ups of the day's proceedings. ITV decides against live broadcasts, apart from coverage of the Budget, but Channel 4 launches The Parliament Programme, which airs four day a week and in the early years of televised coverage, occasionally shows live coverage of major debates.

== 1990s ==
- 1990
  - 14 January – Following the start of television coverage of the House of Commons, the BBC launches a regional politics programme. It forms part of a new BBC2 Sunday lunchtime Westminster Hour.
  - 15 October – As part of a relaunch of its weekday morning output, hourly regional news summaries, broadcast after the on-the-hour news bulletins.
- 1991
  - 7 January – The BBC East Midlands region is created and the first edition of East Midlands Today is broadcast.
  - 16 January – 2 March – The BBC and ITN provide extensive coverage of the Gulf War. In addition to extended news bulletins on both the BBC and ITV, the BBC airs a daytime news and analysis programme War in the Gulf is broadcast, presented by David Dimbleby although as the War progresses, War in the Gulf is scaled back to allow BBC1 to resume its regular daytime schedule. On ITV, news coverage is broadcast all night in the early days of the war but, as with the BBC, as the war progresses news coverage is gradually reduced although ITN produces a 9.25 am report and an 8pm summary each weekday throughout the conflict. On Channel 4, Saturday editions of The Channel 4 Daily are broadcast along with a nightly two-hour programme Midnight Special. Continuous coverage is broadcast on Sky News and UK viewers are able to access CNN's rolling coverage of the War.
  - NewsView is broadcast on BBC Two for the final time, bringing to an end the weekly news review with on-screen subtitles that BBC Two had broadcast since the channel first went on air in 1964. BBC Two replaces the programme with a standard 15-minute news and sport bulletin.
  - 21 September – The BBC launches a five-minute long weekend breakfast news bulletin.
  - United Artists Programming initiates a trial project to provide coverage of Yesterday in the Commons to cable networks across the UK.
- 1992
  - 13 January – Following on from the success of Yesterday in the Commons, United Artists Cable launches a full time channel providing live and recorded coverage of the British Parliament called The Parliamentary Channel.
  - February – TV-am closes its in-house news service and contracts out news bulletins to Sky News. This is the first time that any output from Sky News has been seen on terrestrial television, and continues until 31 December, TV-am's last day on air.
  - 2 March – The News at 5.40 is renamed ITN Early Evening News.
  - 25 June – The final edition of Business Daily is broadcast although the early morning business news bulletins continue to be aired for another three months, until the end of The Channel Four Daily.
  - 25 September – The Channel 4 Daily broadcasts for the final time.
  - 28 September – News bulletins form part of the replacement Channel 4 breakfast programme The Big Breakfast with bulletins every 20 minutes.
- 1993
  - 1 January –
    - At the stroke of midnight, Teletext launches as ITV's new teletext service, replacing ORACLE.
    - At 6 am, GMTV launches and as with TV-am, news is a major part of its output, including regional news bulletins which had not been part of the TV-am service.
  - 3 January – Debut of Breakfast with Frost, a Sunday morning current affairs programme on BBC1 presented by David Frost.
  - 4 January – The BBC launches Business Breakfast as a 60-minute stand-alone programme. It had previously been part of Breakfast News. Consequently, the BBC's weekday breakfast programmes start half an hour earlier, at 6 am.
  - 13 April – For the first time all BBC News programmes have the same look following a relaunch of all of the main news bulletins.
- 1994
  - 9 April – LWT launches a new Sunday morning political programme for ITV – Jonathan Dimbleby.
  - 19 September – BBC2 launches a weekday afternoon business, personal finance and consumer news programme Working Lunch, which broadcasts for 42 weeks per year.
  - November – Associated Newspapers launches Channel One, a network of city news channels. The first to launch is in London.
- 1995
  - 16 January – BBC World Service Television was renamed as BBC World it was launched as an international free-to-air news channel on 26 January at 19:00 GMT.
  - 27 February – European Business News (EBN) launches. The pan-European service is broadcast from London and features rolling coverage of UK business alongside business news from Europe.
- 1996
  - 11 March – CNBC Europe launches. As with EBN, it is based in London and features rolling coverage of UK business alongside business news from Europe, Asia and North America.
  - Pan-European channel Euronews sets up a studio base in London. At this time, the channel, which had been launched by the European Broadcasting Union in 1993, is not generally available to UK viewers as it did not broadcast via the Astra satellite and only had limited carriage on cable although some operators carried the channel when The Parliamentary Channel was not on air.
- 1997
  - 30 March – Channel 5 launches at 6 pm and the opening day’s output sees the introduction of a more informal news service which sees presenters sitting on desks rather than behind them. The new channel's news bulletins are branded 5 News and are aired in the middle of primetime – 8.30 pm – on weeknights and are supplemented by hourly news summaries, broadcast from mid-morning until late at night.
  - 31 March – Channel 5's first full day on air sees the launch of 5 News Early which broadcasts for the first part of the breakfast time hours, coming off air at 7.30 am.
  - 31 August – Television schedules are dominated by coverage of Diana, Princess of Wales's car accident. BBC1 continues to air through the whole night, simulcasting with BBC World News, and both the BBC and ITV broadcast rolling coverage through the day. Over the next six days, culminating with Princess Diana's funeral, both channels provide extensive additional live coverage of events in addition to extended news bulletins.
  - 6 September – The funeral of Diana, Princess of Wales is broadcast on the BBC, ITV and Channel 5 - Channel 4 broadcasts alternative programming with a special evening news programme. Nearly 3 billion viewers and listeners watch the ceremonies worldwide.
  - 9 November – BBC News 24, the corporation's UK television news service, launches at 17.30. It is initially only available to viewers with cable television, but is simulcast on BBC1 overnight.
  - December – ITN purchases a 49% share of Euronews and supplies the content of the channel along with the remaining shareholders. However, carriage of the channel in the UK remains limited until the large-scale takeup of digital television in the 2000s.
- 1998
  - February – European Business News and CNBC Europe merge with the channel continuing to be based in London.
  - 23 September – Following its purchase of the cable-only Parliamentary Channel, the BBC launches BBC Parliament on digital satellite and analogue cable with an audio feed of the channel on DAB.
  - 25 September – Local news channel Channel One closes at 6 pm.
  - 1 October – Sky Sports News launches as part of the launch of Sky's digital television service.
  - 20 October – A new late night programme review of the day's events in Westminster, Despatch Box, is launched. It replaces The Midnight Hour.
  - 15 November –
    - The public launch of digital terrestrial TV in the UK. Consequently, BBC News 24 is now available to all digital viewers. BBC Parliament is carried but due to bandwidth issues, the channel is broadcast in sound only.
    - The first edition of UK Today is broadcast. It airs as a replacement for the regional news bulletins because broadcasting English variations on satellite was not possible due to a single broadcast feed being able to cover the entirety of England and also because the regional broadcasting centres had not been upgraded to digital which meant they were unable to opt out of the network. Therefore, in the initial months of digital television in the UK, BBC regional news was only available to analogue viewers.
- 1999
  - 5 March – ITV News at Ten is broadcast for the final time.
  - 8 March –
    - Major changes to ITV's news programmes take place, including different times for the channel's news programmes and the programmes were referred to as ITV News rather than ITN News. The main bulletin of the day is now considered to be the Early Evening News and is moved from 5.40 pm to 6.30 pm and the evening news is controversially pushed back to 11 pm although the following year the Independent Television Commission forces ITV to move the late evening news back to 10 pm on three nights each week. Also ITV's lunchtime news bulletin is relaunched as ITV Lunchtime News.
    - Following the axe of ITV's News at Ten, Sky News launches Sky News at Ten.
  - ITN World News is broadcast for the final time.
  - 10 May – BBC network news relaunched with new music, titles and a red and ivory set. This design was used for the 25 October relaunch of News 24, enhancing cross-channel promotion of the service.
  - 4 October – Newsnight Scotland, the BBC Scotland opt-out of the main Newsnight programme, is launched on BBC Two Scotland.
  - 31 December – Over 60 countries take part in 2000 Today, a programme seeing in the start of the new millennium. In the UK the 28-hour marathon show is shown on BBC One and hosted by Michael Parkinson, Gaby Roslin and David Dimbleby.

== 2000s ==
- 2000
  - March – Sky News Active launches.
  - 1 August – At 1.30 pm, ITN News Channel launches.
  - 15 September – The final edition of Breakfast News is broadcast.
  - 29 September – The final edition of Breakfast 24 is broadcast on BBC News 24 ahead of a decision to end separate breakfast programmes for BBC One and News 24.
  - 2 October –
    - The first edition of BBC Breakfast is broadcast, the new morning show on BBC One and News 24.
    - BBC News starts broadcasting in 16:9 widescreen.
  - 13 October – The final edition of the BBC Nine O'Clock News is broadcast on BBC One.
  - 16 October – The BBC Ten O'Clock News launches on BBC One amid controversy, having been moved from 9 pm to cash in on the axing of ITN's News at Ten the previous year.
  - 16 October – Oxfordshire, once part of the South East, becomes part of South Today.
- 2001
  - 16 July – The first edition of 60 Seconds is broadcast on BBC Choice. The bulletin is broadcast on the hour each evening between 7 pm and midnight.
  - 3 September – As part of a major reorganisation of the BBC's south east region, Kent and Sussex get their own news programme, South East Today, replacing Newsroom South East.
  - 11 September – Viewers witness a terrorist attack on the United States, and the collapse of the Twin Towers in New York City, live on television. BBC1, ITV, Channel 4 and Channel 5 abandon most regular programming to provide up to date coverage of unfolding events.
  - 1 October – BBC London is launched, replacing Newsroom South East.
- 2002
  - 7 January – Sky News content becomes available on terrestrial television for the first time in a decade when Channel 5 begins simulcasting part of its breakfast news programme Sunrise.
  - 11 February – As part of the launch of the CBBC, Newsround is expanded and several editions are broadcast on the new channel.
  - 30 September – The ITN News Channel is renamed ITV News Channel following the purchase of the channel by Carlton and Granada
  - 30 October –
    - BBC Parliament launches on digital terrestrial television, having previously only been available as an audio-only service. However capacity limitations mean that the picture is squeezed into just one quarter of the screen.
    - Freeview launches as a replacement for the failed ITV Digital and Sky News and Sky Sports News launch on the platform as part of the new service.
  - 11 November – The first edition of a new East Yorkshire and Lincolnshire edition of BBC Look North is broadcast, while the Leeds-based Look North programme now covers West, North and South Yorkshire and the North Midlands.
  - 20 December – The final editions of Westminster Live and Despatch Box are broadcast.
- 2003
  - 8 January – Following a review of the BBC's political output, coverage of politics on BBC Television is relaunched resulting in the first editions of Daily Politics and its Sunday companion programme the Politics Show.
  - 16 January – BBC One broadcasts the first edition of This Week.
  - 10 February – The launch of BBC Three results in the start of a new news bulletin for the channel, called The News Show.
  - 20 March – As the 2003 invasion of Iraq begins many broadcasters abandon regular programming to provide up to date coverage of unfolding events. These include ITV's News at Ten moving to 9 pm for the duration of the conflict, the ITV Evening News being extended to 60 minutes and ITV1 simulcasting the ITV News Channel between 00:00 to 05:30. On Channel 4, a 30-minute lunchtime news bulletin is launched, which is retained following the end of the conflict due to the bulletin's instant popularity.
  - 7 July - The News Show is rebranded as The 7 O'Clock News.
  - UK Today ends after all of the BBC's regional centres are upgraded for digital broadcasting. However it wasn't until May that all 17 regional services became available on satellite due to the BBC broadcasting all seventeen different feeds on 17 different channels on satellite. The intervening two months see satellite viewers receive the BBC South East programme with four other regions available via an interactive service.
- 2004
  - 2 February – After several years of inconsistent scheduling of ITV's late evening news, the bulletin moves to a five nights a week 10.30 pm start time.
  - 16 February – BBC network news titles are relaunched in the style of BBC News 24, introduced two months earlier.
  - Manchester local television channel Channel M launches a weeknight news programme called Channel M News. It is later expanded to include programmes at lunchtime and at 9pm.
- 2005
  - 29 May – The final edition of Breakfast with Frost is broadcast after a twelve-year run.
  - Sky News launches an overnight global bulletin Sky World News. It broadcasts each weeknight between 3 am and 5.30 am.
  - 11 September – BBC One launches Sunday AM, a Sunday morning current affairs programme presented by Andrew Marr.
  - 10 October – The first edition of More4 News is broadcast to co-inside with the launch of More4.
  - 24 October – The first edition of global news programme World News Tonight is broadcast on Sky News as part of a revamp of the channel which sees rolling news on weeknights replaced by presented-led programming. Other new shows include Julie Etchingham presenting The Sky Report, Kay Burley presenting a new programme called Lunchtime Live from 12 to 2 pm, and the daytime show Sky News Today introduces a three-presenter format.
  - 2 December – The final edition of BBC Three's weeknight news bulletin The 7 O'Clock News is broadcast.
  - 23 December – The ITV News Channel stops broadcasting at 6 pm. Poor ratings in comparison to BBC News 24 and Sky News, and ITV's desire to re-use the channel's allocation on Freeview, are cited as the reasons for its closure.
- 2006
  - 7 May – The final edition of Jonathan Dimbleby is broadcast on ITV.
  - 10 July – After less than a year on air, the final edition of World News Tonight is broadcast on Sky News. The programme is dropped due to a poor reception from viewers which had seen BBC News 24 overtake Sky News in the ratings. The evening programmes were replaced by rolling news and an interactive programme, Sky News with Martin Stanford, and the return to a two-presenter format on Sky News Today.
  - 13 November – BBC Parliament broadcasts in full screen format for the first time on the Freeview service, having previously only been available in quarter screen format. The BBC eventually found the bandwidth to make the channel full-screen after receiving "thousands of angry and perplexed e-mails and letters", not to mention questions asked by MPs in the Houses of Parliament itself.
- 2007
  - 22 January – BBC News 24 is relaunched with new titles and new Astons.
  - May – A pilot of a new 8 pm BBC News Summary begins in the East Midlands prior to being rolled out across the UK. The summary consists of a national bulletin followed by a regional summary.
  - 9 September – The BBC One Sunday morning political programme Sunday AM is renamed The Andrew Marr Show when it returns after its summer break.
  - 29 September – The first edition of business news programme Jeff Randall Live is broadcast on Sky News. It launches as a weekly show, moving to four days a week in September 2010. and is hosted by the business journalist Jeff Randall.
  - 29 September – Setanta Sports News launches with ITN as the channel's producer.
- 2008
  - 14 January – ITV News at Ten returns to the schedules on four nights each week – the Friday edition remains at 11 pm.
  - 21 April – BBC News 24 and BBC World are renamed BBC News and BBC World News respectfully.
  - 22 September – The launch of BBC Alba sees the first edition of a new Scottish Gaelic news bulletin An Là.
- 2009
  - 12 January – Strictly Money, a business news programme for UK and Irish viewers, launches on CNBC Europe. Initially launched as a twelve-week experiment the programme became a permanent part of the schedule for UK viewers until its cancellation in 2011.
  - 10 March – The final edition of Manchester news programme Channel M News is broadcast after five years on air. News coverage is then restricted to updates within a new teatime magazine called Channel M Today.
  - 23 June – Following Setanta Sports being placed into administration, Setanta Sports News closes.
  - 4 September – The final edition of Five News at 7 is broadcast. It is replaced by Live from Studio Five, a nightly magazine programme featuring a mix of news and chat, airing from 6:30 pm weeknights.
  - 15 December – With the exception of its travel and holiday sections, ITV's teletext service stops broadcasting on analogue TV. It had ended on Sky Digital the previous day.
  - 18 December – More4 News and Channel 4 News at Noon are broadcast for the final time.

== 2010s ==
- 2010
  - 19 March – Channel M Today is broadcast for the final time on Manchester-based Channel M and brings to an end six years of live local news programming on the channel. 29 of the station's 33 staff were made redundant. Local news continues to be heard on the channel during the periods in which it simulcasts Real Radio North West until the channel's closure on 16 April 2012.
  - 6 May – Sky News HD launches.
  - 30 July – BBC Two broadcasts its final Working Lunch.
  - 2 August – Channel Five reinstates Five News at 7.
  - 23 August – Sky Sports News stops broadcasting on Freeview.
  - December – The final edition of Sunday Live with Adam Boulton is broadcast on Sky News. It is replaced in the new year with a similar show presented by Dermot Murnaghan. Boulton moved to a new weekday show at 13:00 on Sky News.
- 2011
  - 11 March – The final edition of Strictly Money is broadcast by CNBC Europe although the monthly Strictly Rates specials, which cover the announcement of bank lending rates, continue to be broadcast and later Strictly Rates is renamed Decision Time.
  - April – Live at Five is dropped from the schedule following a change in branding policy, and the majority of Sky News output is rebranded as simply Sky News. The name had been in use since the channel's first day on air.
  - 11 December – The Politics Show is broadcast for the final time.
- 2012
  - 9 January – 5News at 7 moves to the earlier start time of 6.30 pm.
  - 15 January – The Sunday Politics is broadcast for the first time.
  - 27 February – The first edition of political discussion programme The Agenda with Tom Bradby is broadcast on ITV.
  - 23 October – The BBC's teletext service Ceefax is switched off following all regions switching to digital broadcasting.
  - 21 December –
    - The final edition of ITV's early morning news programme ITV News at 5:30 is broadcast. Consequently, there is no longer any overnight news coverage on ITV.
    - Newsround is broadcast on BBC One for the final time due to the decision to end the BBC One afternoon block of children's programmes.
- 2013
  - 10 December – The BBC News Channel starts broadcasting in high definition.
- 2014
  - 27 March – The final edition of business news programme Jeff Randall Live is broadcast on Sky News.
  - 22 May – As part of a major shake-up in BBC Scotland News and current affairs programme in the run up to the 2014 Scottish independence referendum, Newsnight Scotland is broadcast for the final time. It is replaced on the 28th by a new programme – Scotland 2016.
- 2015
  - 7 April – BBC News launches a new two-hour weekday current affairs programme called The Victoria Derbyshire Show. The programme is broadcast on both BBC Two and the BBC News Channel;
  - 1 June – BBC World News programmes Outside Source and Business Live make their debut on the BBC News Channel. They appear as a result of cutbacks which also sees the overnight simulcast of BBC World News beginning an hour earlier, at midnight.
  - October – A new format for ITV News at Ten is launched as part of a move to enhance the reputation of ITV's news and current affairs output.
- 2016
  - 8 May – The first edition of Peston on Sunday is broadcast on ITV. The programme is not a year-round show and is broadcast in block of around ten programmes until its final series ended in May 2018.
  - 16 July – The final edition of 60 Seconds is broadcast on BBC Three. The programme ends due to the closure of BBC Three as a linear television channel.
  - 28 November – The final edition of The Agenda with Tom Bradby is broadcast on ITV.
  - 14 December – Scotland 2016 is broadcast on BBC Two Scotland for the final time.
- 2017
  - 8 January – Sophy Ridge on Sunday launches on Sky News.
- 2018
  - 30 May – The final 8 pm BBC News Summary is broadcast.
  - 24 July – The final edition of Daily Politics (and Sunday spin-off The Sunday Politics) is broadcast, ending a fifteen-year run as BBC News' flagship weekday politics show.
  - 3 September – The first edition of Politics Live is broadcast.
  - 26 September – The first edition of Peston is broadcast on ITV, It is a continuation of Peston on Sunday which had been shown on ITV since 2016.
- 2019
  - 4 March – The Monday to Thursday editions of BBC News at Ten are cut from 45 minutes to 35 minutes. The reduction affects editions of the national and local news bulletins airing in that timeslot, as well as the post-bulletin weather forecast, and is done to make way for a new BBC Three strand of programming, as well as avoiding a clash with the start of BBC Two's Newsnight.
  - 18 July – BBC One broadcasts the final edition of This Week after sixteen years on air. A special live audience edition of the programme marks its finale.
  - 13 October – Sky News Sunrise is broadcast for the final time. The programme, which launched when Sky News first went on air more than 30 years ago, is replaced the following day with two new shows – The Early Rundown and Sky News @ Breakfast.

== 2020s ==
- 2020
  - 17 March – The final edition of The Victoria Derbyshire Show is broadcast to focus on coverage of the COVID-19 pandemic. The programme had been due to come off air later in 2020 due to funding cuts.
  - 15 July – The BBC announces that it will "no longer commission most of the other bespoke programmes we currently make for BBC Parliament, although we will continue to draw on our archive to broadcast our popular historical election coverage." This is part of plans the BBC set out at the start of the year to modernise BBC News against the backdrop of having to find £80 million of savings.
  - July – The teatime edition of Newsround is axed, having been on air since 1972. It ended following BBC bosses concluding that children no longer turn on traditional television channels when they return home from school and instead the BBC would focus on the morning edition which will be aimed at schools, where it is often used by teachers in classrooms.
  - August – The additional simulcasts with BBC World News are made permanent. Consequently, the two channels now simulcast between each day 10:00 to 12:00 and on weekdays 19:00 to 06:00, with opt-outs for BBC News at Ten and for half an hour at 20:30, and between 21:00 to 06:00, apart from the evening BBC One bulletin, at the weekend.
- 2021
  - 9 April – All major TV channels, including BBC One, BBC Two, ITV and Channel 5 suspend regular programming following the death of Prince Philip, which is announced at midday. BBC One, BBC Two and BBC Parliament simulcast BBC News' live coverage for the rest of the day as all BBC programmes are cancelled in favour of ongoing news coverage of unfolding events and special programmes paying tribute to the Prince. ITV also cancels or moves the rest of its scheduled programming - horse racing coverage is moved to ITV4 - in favour of rolling news coverage, extended news bulletins and tribute programmes. Channel 5 airs a two-hour edition of its early evening news programme.
  - 13 June – GB News channel starts broadcasting.
  - 31 August – From this day, BBC Parliament's programming is restricted to nothing other than live and recorded coverage from Westminster and the devolved chambers. This is being seen as part of a range of cutbacks to the channel, which also sees the end of coverage of party conferences as well as the ending of The Day in Parliament and The Week in Parliament and the cessation of all other programming made for the channel. Also ending are the Sunday broadcasts of national political shows, C-SPAN and the repeat of Question Time along with archive broadcasts such as general election results programme reruns. Finally, the showing of political highlights during recesses ends and the channel now effectively closes down when none of the UK's Parliamentary bodied are in session as the BBC News Channel is now seen on BBC Parliament during recesses.
  - 8 November - Channel 5 relaunches 5 News as a single one-hour show, broadcasting from 5pm until 6pm.
- 2022
  - 25 April – News UK launches talkTV. The channel features video simulcasts of TalkRadio programming in off-peak hours, but launches with three original programmes - The News Desk, Piers Morgan Uncensored, and The Talk.
  - 14 July – The BBC sets out plans for a new global news channel titled BBC News. It will replace its two existing news services for the UK and overseas.
  - 31 August − GB News performs a shakeup of its daytime schedule which will take effect from the first week in September, giving Gloria de Piero and Philip Davies and Esther McVey new shows, while Alexandra Phillips and Colin Brazier are axed from the channel.
  - 4 September – The first edition of Sunday with Laura Kuenssberg is broadcast. It replaced The Andrew Marr Show as the network's flagship Sunday talk show after Andrew Marr resigned from the BBC to front a talk show on LBC in 2021.
- 2023
  - 3 April – The BBC News Channel closes as a stand-alone UK channel. It merges with BBC World News to form a single worldwide news channel called BBC News with programmes based on BBC World News output although the ability to break away from international programming for a major UK news story is to be retained. The weekday simulcasts of the BBC One news bulletins and BBC Breakfast continue to be shown on the channel and a simulcast of Newsnight is launched.
  - 17 April-October – Nicky Campbell's BBC Radio 5 Live weekday morning show is simulcast on BBC Two and the BBC News Channel. This is the first time that a BBC radio programme has been simulcast on a BBC television channel. The simulcast ends in October to allow for extended live coverage of the Gaza war conflict and when programming returns to normal, the simulcast does not reappear.
- 2024
  - 28 May – Newsnight relaunches as a half-hour "interview, debate and discussion" programme, ditching its special reporting team. The change is part of cost-cutting measures across the BBC.
  - 3 June – The BBC News at One is extended to an hour-long programme.
  - June-17 July – During the run-up to, and for the immediate period after, the 2024 United Kingdom general election, the channel airs UK-focussed content during weekday daytime.
- 2025
  - 15 January – BBC Breakfast stops being aired on the BBC News Channel during the week. Instead, the News Channel carries the global news service which, at that time of day, broadcasts rolling news and business reports. Breakfast continues to air on the News Channel at the weekend.
  - Spring – The weekday editions of Breakfast return, meaning that, once again, Breakfast is aired on the BBC News Channel every day of the week.
  - 29 October – The BBC News Channel, once again, starts to simulcast the international feed during Breakfast.
- 2026
  - 18 September – The Friday edition of Newsnight moves to the earlier time of 7pm.
- 20 September – BBC Breakfast is aired for the final time on Sundays. It is replaced the following Sunday by a simulcast of the BBC News Channel.

== See also ==
- Timeline of BBC Television News
- Timeline of ITN
- Timeline of Sky News
