= Timeline of BBC Television News =

A timeline of notable events relating to BBC Television News.

== 1930s ==
- 1936
  - 2 November – The BBC opens the world's first regular high-definition television service from Alexandra Palace. Television news coverage consists of cinema newsreels from British Movietone News and sound-only news bulletins from BBC Radio.
- 1937
  - 12 May – First use of its TV outside broadcast van to cover the procession that followed the coronation of King George VI and Queen Elizabeth.
- 1938
  - No events.
- 1939
  - 1 September – The BBC Television Service is suspended, owing to the imminent outbreak of the Second World War.

== 1940s ==
- 1940 to 1945
  - Television is closed for the duration of the Second World War.
- 1946
  - 7 June – BBC Television broadcasts resume.
  - BBC Radio bulletins start being simulcast on television with a still picture of Big Ben.
- 1947
  - 9 November – The first use of telerecording of an outside broadcast, the Service of Remembrance from the Cenotaph is televised live and a telerecording shown that evening.
  - 20 November – The wedding of Princess Elizabeth and Philip Mountbatten, Duke of Edinburgh is televised by the BBC. It is watched by an estimated 400,000 viewers.
- 1948
  - 5 January – The first edition of Television Newsreel is broadcast. The weeknight programme, broadcast at 7:30pm runs for fifteen minutes.
- 1949
  - No events.

== 1950s ==
- 1950
  - 23 April – The first edition of Children's Newsreel is broadcast.
- 1951
  - A Sunday version of Television Newsreel, Newsreel Review of the Week, is launched.
- 1952
  - No events.
- 1953
  - 2 June – The coronation of Queen Elizabeth II in Westminster Abbey is televised by the BBC and watched live by an estimated audience of 20 million people in the United Kingdom.
  - 11 November – The first edition of Panorama is presented by Daily Mail reporter Pat Murphy. Panorama is the world's longest-running current affairs programme and retains a peak-time slot to this day.
- 1954
  - 5 July – BBC newsreader Richard Baker reads the first televised BBC News bulletin which replaces Television Newsreel.
  - 7 October – BBC Television covers a party political conference for the first time when it broadcasts from the Conservative Party Conference in Blackpool.
- 1955
  - September – Kenneth Kendall becomes the BBC's first in-vision newsreader, followed by Richard Baker and Robert Dougall.
- 1956
  - No events.
- 1957
  - 18 February – The first episode of Tonight is broadcast.
  - 30 August – BBC Scotland launches a weekday five-minute news bulletin and a Saturday teatime sports round-up. They launch one day before the start of broadcasting by Scottish television which provided its own regional news service from the outset.
  - September – The first broadcasts of regional news bulletins on the BBC take place and bulletins also start being broadcast in Wales and Northern Ireland.
  - 30 September – Regional television news bulletins for the north of England begin from Piccadilly's studio N in Manchester.
- 1958
  - 28 October – The BBC televises the State Opening of Parliament for the first time.
- 1959
  - The BBC North East and Cumbria region is created with localised bulletins from Newcastle-upon-Tyne aired for the first time. Previously, the area was part of a pan-Northern region based in Manchester.

== 1960s ==
- 1960
  - No events.
- 1961
  - September – The final edition of Children's Newsreel is broadcast.
- 1962
  - 17 September – BBC Wales launches Wales Today. The programme is seen by viewers in both Wales and the west of England until February 1964 when the BBC Wales and BBC West regions are created.
- 1963
  - 22 November – At 7.05pm, between Points of View and Tonight, BBC TV broadcasts a newsflash about the shooting of American president John F. Kennedy. Tonight is later interrupted at 7.26pm for another newsflash, which later announced the death of the American president. For the next nineteen minutes, viewers saw revolving globe ident, punctuated by four brief bulletins. BBC TV then resumed normal programming at 7.50pm. A tribute programme to the late president, presented by Ian Trethowan is shown later in the evening. The newsflashes are presented by stand-in John Roberts, because regular newscasters Richard Baker, Robert Dougall and Kenneth Kendall are at the annual dinner and ball of the Guild of Television Producers and Directors.
- 1964
  - 20 April – BBC2 beings broadcasting and BBC News launches a new news programme for the channel called Newsroom.
  - 26 April – Another new news programme for BBC2 is launched called News Review. The programme is a summary of the week's news with subtitles for the deaf and hard-of-hearing.
- 1965
  - 18 June – Tonight is broadcast on BBC1 for the final time.
- 1966
  - 5 April – The Money Programme makes its debut on BBC2. It continued to air until 2010.
- 1967
  - No events.
- 1968
  - 7 March – Newsroom on BBC2 becomes the first UK news programme to be transmitted in colour.
  - 25 March – BBC regional television from Leeds begins and the first edition of Look North is broadcast. Previously, the Yorkshire area had been part of a wider North region based in Manchester.
  - 1 April – The first edition of BBC Scotland's Reporting Scotland is broadcast.
- 1969
  - 9 September – The first edition of Nationwide is broadcast on BBC1.
  - 19–20 September – BBC News relocates from Alexandra Palace in North London to BBC Television Centre in West London.

== 1970s ==
- 1970
  - BBC News appoints its first political editor with Hardiman Scott being the first person to take on the role.
  - 14 September – Robert Dougall presents the first edition of the BBC Nine O'Clock News. The programme was launched in response to ITN's News at Ten.
- 1971
  - No events.
- 1972
  - 4 April – The first edition of Newsround is broadcast, presented by John Craven.
  - 29 December – The final edition of BBC2's news programme Newsroom is broadcast. It is replaced by a five-minute news summary.
- 1973
  - 2 January – A new late evening extended news bulletin News Extra begins broadcasting on BBC2.
- 1974
  - 7 January – A two-minute mid-afternoon regional news summary is broadcast on BBC1 for the first time. It is transmitted immediately before the start of the afternoon's children's programmes.
  - 23 September – Teletext service Ceefax goes live.
- 1975
  - 1 September
    - Tonight returns to BBC1 after thirteen years off air. The new programme airs as a late evening news and analysis programme.
    - BBC2's late evening news bulletin is renamed Newsnight.
- 1976
  - 17 September – The original incarnation of Newsnight is broadcast for the final time. It is replaced three days later with a shorter bulletin called Late Night News on 2.
- 1977
  - No events.
- 1978
  - No events.
- 1979
  - 5 July – The final edition of Tonight is broadcast on BBC1.
  - 25 September – The first edition of Question Time is broadcast on BBC1.

== 1980s ==
- 1980
  - 28 January – Newsnight is launched on BBC2.
  - March – The first in-vision Ceefax transmissions are broadcast.
- 1981
  - 29 July – The Wedding of Charles, Prince of Wales and Lady Diana Spencer is produced by BBC Television & Radio with an audience of 750 million viewers and listeners in over 60 countries.
  - 4 September – The final edition of Midday News is broadcast.
  - 7 September – News After Noon is launched as a 30-minute lunchtime news programme, replacing the much shorter Midday News.
- 1982
  - BBC News provides extensive coverage of the Falklands War with newsflashes supplemented by additional and extended news bulletins, including weekend editions of Newsnight.
  - 1 November – The first edition of Welsh-language news bulletin Newyddion is broadcast on the first night of broadcasting of Wales' new fourth channel S4C.
- 1983
  - 17 January – Breakfast Time, the UK's first national breakfast television service is launched. News bulletins and summaries are broadcast every 15 minutes.
  - 5 August – The final edition of Nationwide is broadcast.
  - 24 October – Sixty Minutes launches as the new evening news programme to replace Nationwide.
- 1984
  - 27 July – The final edition of Sixty Minutes is broadcast.
  - 30 July – BBC1's teatime news programme reverts to its original name of Evening News and to its original broadcast time of 5:40pm. The regional news programmes follow, broadcasting for 20 minutes from 5:55pm. This is a stop-gap measure and continues for five weeks.
  - 4–12 August – The BBC's coverage of the 1984 Summer Olympic Games sees Breakfast Time being given over to Olympic Games highlights, and this includes weekend editions. News summaries are broadcast on the hour and this is the first time that the BBC has broadcast a full service of pre-lunchtime news bulletins at the weekend.
  - 3 September – BBC1's teatime news hour is relaunched and now runs from 6pm until 7pm. A new 30-minute long news programme the Six O'Clock News is launched and this is followed by a longer regional news magazine which is expanded to 25 minutes.
  - 18 November – The BBC launches its first Sunday lunchtime political interview show called This Week, Next Week.
  - December – BBC1 stops broadcasting a late night news summary.
- 1985
  - 23 January – Television coverage of proceedings in the House of Lords begins.
  - 30 August – The weekday lunchtime Financial Report, broadcast on BBC1 in London and the south east, is broadcast for the final time ahead of the launch of a lunchtime regional news bulletin for viewers in the BBC South East region.
  - 22 December – Having been broadcast every Sunday teatime since the launch of BBC2 in 1964, News Review is broadcast for the final time.
- 1986
  - 4 January – The first edition of NewsView is broadcast on BBC2. The new Saturday early evening programme lasts 40 minutes and combines the day's news with a look back at the week's news.
  - 6 January – A regional news bulletin is broadcast after the Nine O'Clock News for the first time. It had originally been planned to appear the previous September to co-inside with last year's relaunch of the Nine O'Clock News.
  - 8 May – The BBC broadcasts live coverage of the local election results for the first time. The coverage airs until approximately 2.30am on both BBC1 and BBC Radio 4. BBC1's coverage is branded as a ‘Newsnight Special’.
  - 9 June – The BBC launches its first parliamentary review programme when the first edition of The Lords This Week (renamed The Week in the Lords later in 1986) is shown on BBC2.
  - 17 October – BBC2 broadcasts a teatime news summary with subtitles for the last time. For the past three years this bulletin which had been broadcast at around 5:25pm, had been the first programme of the day (apart from educational programmes and sports coverage).
  - 24 October – Ahead of the launch of the BBC's new daytime service, News After Noon is broadcast for the final time.
  - 27 October
    - BBC1 starts a full daytime television service. Among the new programmes is a new lunchtime news bulletin, the One O'Clock News. The programme continues to this day.
    - The weekday mid-afternoon regional news summary moves to BBC2.
  - 10 November – Breakfast Time is relaunched with a more formal news and current affairs format.
  - 8 December – Six weeks after launching its daytime service, BBC TV starts broadcasting hourly news summaries. Morning bulletins are shown on BBC1 and early afternoon summaries (at 2pm, 3pm and 3:50pm) are shown on BBC2. Each bulletin is followed by a weather forecast.
- 1987
  - No events.
- 1988
  - 18 September – On the Record replaces This Week Next Week as BBC1's Sunday lunchtime political discussion programme.
  - 31 October – For the first time, Newsnight is given a fixed starting time, of 10:30pm.
- 1989
  - 22 June – John Craven presents his final edition of Newsround.
  - 29 September – The final edition of Breakfast Time is broadcast.
  - 2 October – The first edition of BBC Breakfast News is broadcast.
  - 21 November – Television coverage of proceedings in the House of Commons begins and the BBC provides live coverage of Prime Ministers Questions in a twice-weekly programme called Westminster Live. Also, BBC2 launches a weekday breakfast round-up of yesterday's proceedings. This is preceded by the 8am bulletin from Breakfast News.

== 1990s ==
- 1990
  - 14 January – Following the start of television coverage of the House of Commons, the BBC launches a regional politics programme. It forms part of a new Sunday lunchtime Westminster Hour.
  - 15 October – As part of a relaunch of its weekday morning output, the new service includes hourly regional news summaries, broadcast after the on-the-hour news bulletins.
- 1991
  - 7 January – The BBC East Midlands region is created and the first edition of East Midlands Today is broadcast.
  - 16 January–2 March – BBC News provides extensive coverage of the Gulf War. In addition to extended news bulletins, a daytime news and analysis programme War in the Gulf is broadcast, presented by David Dimbleby although as the War progresses, War in the Gulf is scaled back to allow BBC1 to resume its regular daytime schedule. As a result, the morning programme Daytime UK is briefly suspended, while the Children's BBC programming block moves to BBC2 during the first days of the conflict.
  - 2 March – NewsView is broadcast on BBC2 for the final time, bringing to an end the weekly news review with on-screen subtitles that BBC2 had broadcast since the channel first went on air in 1964. BBC2 replaces the programme with a standard 15-minute news and sport bulletin.
  - 15 April – The World Service Television News service is launched. Unlike World Service radio which is funded by direct grant from the Foreign and Commonwealth Office, WSTV is commercially funded and carries advertising which means that it cannot be broadcast in the UK.
  - 21 September – The BBC launches a five-minute long weekend breakfast news bulletin.
- 1992
  - No events.
- 1993
  - 3 January – The debut of Breakfast with Frost, a Sunday morning current affairs programme on BBC1 presented by David Frost.
  - 13 April – For the first time, all BBC News programmes have the same look following a relaunch of all of the main news bulletins.
- 1994
  - 19 September – BBC2 launches a weekday afternoon business, personal finance and consumer news programme with Working Lunch, which broadcasts for 42 weeks per year.
- 1995
  - 16 January – BBC World Service Television is renamed to BBC World. It was launched as an international free-to-air news channel on 26 January at 19:00 GMT.
  - March – BBC News creates its very first website, for the 1995 Budget.
- 1996
  - 9 May – The BBC announces the launch of a new rolling news channel as part of its plans for digital television.
- 1997
  - 31 August – BBC1 interrupts its late-night film to bring a newsflash about Diana, Princess of Wales's car crash. The film then resumes, while another newsflash airs on BBC2 after their late-night film. BBC1 stays on the air throughout the night, simulcasting with BBC World News to bring updates of the car crash and Diana's subsequent death, which is announced at 5am. At 6am, a rolling news programme, first anchored by Martyn Lewis and from 1pm by Peter Sissons, is shown on both BBC1 and BBC2 until the latter breaks away at 3pm to provide alternative programming. BBC1 continues to provide coverage until closedown when it once again hands over to BBC World News. A weather bulletin is the only non-Diana programme to air on BBC1 on this day.
  - 1-5 September – BBC1 broadcasts extended news coverage of the events following Princess Diana's death.
  - 6 September – The funeral of Diana, Princess of Wales is broadcast on BBC Radio & Television and aired to 187 other countries worldwide. Nearly 3 billion viewers and listeners watch and listen to the ceremonies.
  - 4 November – BBC News Online launches. This follows specially created websites covering the 1997 general election and the death of Princess Diana.
  - 9 November – BBC News 24 launches at 5:30pm.
- 1998
  - 23 September – Following its purchase of the cable-only Parliamentary Channel, the BBC launches BBC Parliament on digital satellite and analogue cable with an audio feed of the channel on DAB.
  - 6 October – The BBC announces plans to revamp its news bulletins following an 18-month review of news programming, the largest ever undertaken in the UK. Changes will include a new look Six O'Clock News concentrating on national and regional stories, and an increase in world news stories for the Nine O'Clock News.
  - 20 October – A new late night programme review of the day's events in Westminster, Despatch Box, is launched. It replaces The Midnight Hour.
  - 15 November
    - The public launch of digital terrestrial TV in the UK. Consequently, BBC News 24 is now available to all digital viewers for the first time.
    - The first edition of UK Today is broadcast. It airs as a replacement for the regional news bulletins because English variations on satellite were not possible due to a single broadcast feed being able to cover the entirety of England (in reality it could cover much of north and western Europe) and also because the regional broadcasting centres had not been upgraded to digital which meant they were unable to opt-out of the network. Therefore, in the initial months of digital television in the UK, BBC regional news was only available to analogue viewers.
- 1999
  - 31 December – 2000 Today, a programme seeing in the start of the new millennium airs. In the UK, the 28-hour marathon show is shown on BBC One and hosted by Michael Parkinson, Gaby Roslin and David Dimbleby. The broadcast includes regular news bulletins which were seen at various points throughout the programme.

== 2000s ==
- 2000
  - 20 June ─ BBC Television Centre suffers a power failure, leading to BBC News 24 (and other BBC channels) going off air temporarily. Staff were evacuated from the building. Later news broadcasts had to be recorded at the company's Westminster studios.
  - 13 October – The final edition of the BBC Nine O'Clock News airs.
  - 16 October
    - The BBC Ten O'Clock News launches on BBC One amid controversy, having been moved from 9pm to cash in on the axing of ITN's News at Ten the previous year.
    - Oxfordshire, once part of the South East, becomes part of South Today.
- 2001
  - 16 July – The first edition of 60 Seconds is broadcast on BBC Choice. The bulletin is broadcast on the hour each evening between 7pm and midnight.
  - 3 September – As part of a major reorganisation of the BBC's south east region, Kent and Sussex get their own news programme called South East Today which replaces Newsroom South East.
  - 11 September – British viewers witness a terrorist attack on the United States and the collapse of the Twin Towers in New York City, live on television. BBC One simulcasts BBC News 24's coverage immediately after the lunchtime showing of Neighbours and, apart from one hour when the rolling coverage moves to BBC Two, BBC One airs non-stop coverage until the following morning.
  - 1 October – BBC London is launched, replacing Newsroom South East.
- 2002
  - 25 January – UK Today ends after all of the BBC's regional centres are upgraded for digital broadcasting. However, due to cost considerations, the BBC decides not to create separate regional services for BBC Two in England. Despite this, the weekday afternoon regional bulletin continues on BBC Two and digital viewers see BBC London News rather than their own regional news bulletin.
  - 11 February – As part of the launch of the CBBC channel, Newsround is expanded and several editions are broadcast on there throughout the day.
  - 30 October – BBC Parliament launches on digital terrestrial television, having previously only been available as an audio-only service. However, capacity limitations mean that the picture is squeezed into just one quarter of the screen.
  - 11 November – The first edition of a new East Yorkshire and Lincolnshire edition of BBC Look North is broadcast, while the Leeds-based Look North programme now covers the West, North and South Yorkshire and the North Midlands.
  - 20 December – The final editions of Westminster Live and Despatch Box are broadcast.
- 2003
  - 8 January – As a result of the review of the BBC's political output, coverage of politics on BBC Television is relaunched resulting in the first editions of Daily Politics and its Sunday companion programme the Politics Show.
  - 16 January – BBC One airs the first edition of This Week.
  - 9 February – The launch of BBC Three results in the start of a new news bulletin for the channel called The 7 O'Clock News.
  - 20 March – As the 2003 invasion of Iraq begins, many broadcasters abandon regular programming to provide up to date coverage of unfolding events.
  - 4 July – The mid-afternoon regional news bulletin is moved from BBC Two to BBC One.
  - 8 December – BBC News 24 is relaunched with a new set and titles, as well as a new Breaking News sting. Networked news on BBC One and Two remains with the same titles though the set was redesigned in a similar style to that of the new News 24.
- 2004
  - 16 February – Network news titles are relaunched in the style of BBC News 24, introduced two months earlier.
- 2005
  - 29 May – The final edition of Breakfast with Frost is broadcast after a twelve-year run.
  - 11 September – BBC One launches Sunday AM, a Sunday morning current affairs programme presented by Andrew Marr.
  - 20 December – The final edition of BBC Three's weeknight news bulletin The 7 O'Clock News is broadcast.
- 2006
  - 31 May – The World on BBC Four is replaced by an edition of World News Today.
  - 13 November – BBC Parliament broadcasts in full-screen format for the first time on the Freeview service, having previously only been available in quarter-screen format. The BBC eventually found the bandwidth to make the channel full-screen after receiving "thousands of angry and perplexed e-mails and letters", not to mention questions asked by MPs in the Houses of Parliament itself.
- 2007
  - 22 January – BBC News 24 is relaunched with new titles and new Astons.
  - May – A pilot of a new 8pm BBC News Summary begins in the East Midlands prior to being rolled out across the UK. The summary consists of a national bulletin followed by a regional summary.
  - 9 September – The BBC One Sunday morning political programme Sunday AM is renamed The Andrew Marr Show when it returns after its Summer break.
- 2008
  - 11 March – BBC Arabic Television launches.
  - 21 April – BBC News 24 and BBC World are renamed BBC News and BBC World News respectively.
  - 22 September – The launch of BBC Alba sees the first edition of a new Scottish Gaelic news bulletin An Là.
- 2009
  - 14 January – BBC Persian Television launches.

== 2010s ==
- 2010
  - 30 July – BBC Two broadcasts its final Working Lunch. It is replaced by GMT with George Alagiah.
- 2011
  - 11 December – The Politics Show is broadcast for the final time.
- 2012
  - 15 January – The Sunday Politics is broadcast for the first time.
  - 7 March – Brighton moves from South region to South-East region, after the Meridian digital switchover.
  - July–September – BBC News Channel, Network bulletin's and BBC World News temporarily move output to the Olympic Park in Bow for the duration of the 2012 Olympic Games.
  - 23 October – The BBC's teletext service Ceefax is switched off following all regions switching to digital broadcasting. The very last Pages from Ceefax transmission had taken place two days earlier.
  - 21 December – Newsround is broadcast on BBC One for the final time due to the decision to end the BBC One afternoon block of children's programmes.
- 2013
  - 5 April – BBC Monitoring moves to Licence Fee funding.
  - 10 December – The BBC News Channel starts broadcasting in high definition.
- 2014
  - 22 May – As part of a major shake-up in BBC Scotland News and current affairs programmes in the run up to the 2014 Scottish independence referendum, Newsnight Scotland is broadcast for the final time. It is replaced on 28 May by a new programme, Scotland 2016.
- 2015
  - 7 April – BBC News launches a new two-hour weekday current affairs programme called The Victoria Derbyshire Show. The programme is broadcast on both BBC Two and the BBC News Channel.
  - 1 June – BBC World News programmes Outside Source and Business Live make their debut on the BBC News Channel. They appear as a result of cutbacks which also sees the overnight simulcast of BBC World News beginning an hour earlier at midnight.
- 2016
  - 16 February – The final edition of 60 Seconds is broadcast on BBC Three. The programme ends due to the closure of BBC Three as a linear television channel.
  - 14 December – Scotland 2016 is broadcast on BBC Two Scotland for the final time.
- 2017
  - No events.
- 2018
  - 30 May – The final 8pm BBC News Summary is broadcast.
  - 24 July – The final edition of Daily Politics and Sunday spin-off The Sunday Politics) is broadcast, ending a fifteen-year run as BBC News' flagship weekday politics show.
  - 3 September – The first edition of Politics Live is broadcast.
- 2019
  - 4 March – The Monday to Thursday editions of BBC News at Ten are cut from 45 minutes to 35 minutes. The reduction affects editions of the national and local news bulletins airing in that timeslot, as well as the post-bulletin weather forecast and is done to make way for a new BBC Three strand of programming, as well as avoiding a clash with the start of BBC Two's Newsnight.
  - 18 July – BBC One broadcasts the final edition of This Week after sixteen years on air. A special live audience edition of the programme marks its finale.
  - 18 November – The BBC announces plans to close its red button text service by 30 January 2020.

== 2020s ==
- 2020
  - 29 January – The BBC announces that it has suspended its plan to switch-off the BBC Red Button service, one day before the service was due to have started being phased out. The announcement comes following a petition, organised by the National Federation of the Blind of the UK (NFBUK), which was submitted to the BBC and Downing Street. following protests.
  - 17 March – The final edition of The Victoria Derbyshire Show is broadcast to focus on coverage of the COVID-19 pandemic. The programme had been due to come off air later in 2020 due to funding cuts.
  - 30 March – Newsnight moves to a 10:45pm start time. This was due to Newsnight temporarily sharing a studio with BBC News at Ten during the COVID-19 pandemic to cut footfall in Broadcasting House and allow turnover in the studio, due to News at Ten not finishing until 10:35pm. The programme retains its new later start time after moving to a new studio in October.
  - July – The teatime edition of Newsround is axed, having been on air since 1972. It ended following the BBC concluding that children no longer turn on traditional television channels when they return home from school and instead the BBC would focus on the morning edition which will be aimed at schools where it is often used by teachers in classrooms.
  - August – The additional simulcasts between the BBC News Channel and BBC World News are made permanent. Consequently, the two channels now simulcast between each day 10am to 12pm and on weekdays 7pm to 6am with opt-outs for BBC News at Ten and for half an hour at 8:30pm and between 9pm to 6am, apart from the evening BBC One bulletin at the weekend.
- 2021
  - 9 April – At just after midday, Buckingham Palace announces the death of Prince Philip and BBC One, BBC Parliament and BBC World News switch over to BBC News (which is already simulcast on BBC Two) to announce the death. The message was likely received during the top-of-the hour headlines, as the wide-shot in the opening featured multiple journalists running across the room.
  - 19 December – The final edition of The Andrew Marr Show is broadcast, ending after 15 years ahead of Marr leaving the BBC.
- 2022
  - 13 June – BBC News unveils its flagship studio for use during BBC News at Six, BBC News at Ten and BBC London's local newscasts. The newsroom's new look and technological features are first introduced to the viewing public by Huw Edwards on a report during The One Show with Alex Jones.
  - 14 July – The BBC sets out plans for a new global news channel titled BBC News. It will replace its two existing news services for the UK and overseas. It is scheduled to launch in April 2023.
  - 4 September – The first edition of Sunday with Laura Kuenssberg is broadcast.
  - 8 September – Just after 6:30pm, Buckingham Palace announces the Death and state funeral of Elizabeth II and BBC One, BBC Two, BBC Parliament and BBC World News switch over to BBC News to announce the death of Elizabeth II. BBC One was already on air covering The Queen's health since lunchtime while they announced it live on air.
  - 16 December – The Cambridgeshire edition of BBC Look East ends as part of cost-cutting measures across the BBC. The Cambridge studios will close, with all broadcasts returning to their pre-1997 region-wide format broadcast from the existing studios in Norwich. The Oxford edition of South Today will also be scrapped.
- 2023
  - 3 April – The BBC News Channel closes as a stand-alone channel. It merges with BBC World News to form a single worldwide news channel called BBC News with programmes based on BBC World News output although the ability to break away from international programming for a major UK news story is retained. The weekday simulcasts of the BBC One news bulletins and BBC Breakfast continue to be shown on the channel and a simulcast of Newsnight is launched.
  - 17 April-October – Nicky Campbell's BBC Radio 5 Live weekday morning show starts to be simulcast on BBC Two and the BBC News Channel. This is the first time that a BBC radio programme has been simulcast on a BBC television channel. The simulcast ends in October to allow for extended live coverage of the Gaza war conflict and when programming returns to normal, the simulcast does not reappear.
- 2024
  - 28 May – Newsnight relaunches as a half-hour "interview, debate and discussion" programme, ditching its special reporting team. The change is part of cost-cutting measures across the BBC.
  - 3 June – The BBC News at One is extended to an hour-long programme.
  - June-17 July – During the run-up to, and for the immediate period after, the 2024 United Kingdom general election, the channel airs UK-focussed content on weekday daytime.
  - 18 July – The weekday daytime UK-separate BBC News Channel service ends following the State Opening of Parliament. It had originally been planned to end immediately after the election but continues for an extra week-and-a-half to cover the latest political stories as the new Government began work. The UK rolling coverage had been broadcast between 9am and 8pm.
- 2025
  - 15 January – BBC Breakfast stops being aired on the BBC News Channel during the week. Instead, the News Channel carries the global news service which, at that time of day, broadcasts rolling news and business reports. Breakfast continues to air on the News Channel at the weekend.
  - Spring – The weekday editions of Breakfast return, meaning that, once again, Breakfast is aired on the BBC News Channel every day of the week.
  - 1 August – Sportsday ends on the BBC News Channel, with the focus shifting to breaking sports news ‘digitally’ - ie online. Consequently, the only News Channel-exclusive UK-orientated sports news bulletin airs on weekdays at approximately 13.35 when BBC One viewers of the BBC News at One are seeing their regional news bulletin.
- 2026
  - 18 September – The Friday edition of Newsnight moves to the earlier time of 7pm.
  - 20 September – BBC Breakfast is broadcast on a Sunday for the final time.
  - 27 September – Following last week's final Sunday edition of BBC Breakfast, the BBC News Channel now airs on Sundays in its place on BBC One.

== See also ==
- Timeline of the BBC News Channel
- Timeline of television news in the United Kingdom
