= Tahu Hole =

Tahu Ronald Charles Pearce Hole CBE (29 March 1906 – 22 November 1985) was a New Zealand born journalist who was the BBC's television news editor during the period immediately following the Second World War.

== Early life and work ==
Hole was born in Christchurch, New Zealand but was not, as might otherwise be inferred from his first name, of Māori descent. He trained as a journalist and worked for a number of newspapers in New Zealand and Australia, including The Sydney Morning Herald. He was the Herald's news editor for a time and in 1937 travelled to the United Kingdom as its London correspondent.

Hole was in London when Britain entered the Second World War and used the facilities of the BBC to send news of the conflict to Sydney. He later acted as a news commentator for the BBC and became a permanent member of staff in 1943. Soon after the war, the BBC's Director-General, William Haley, formed a news editorial board with himself as Editor-in-Chief and four other members, the most junior of whom was Hole as Overseas Talks Deputy. In 1947, the three more senior members departed, two choosing jobs elsewhere and one having to resign due to a serious illness. As the only remaining participant, Hole was promoted to news editor in 1948.

== Work as BBC News Editor ==
Hole was unpopular among his staff, partly for his authoritarian approach to management but also for his extreme caution in directing the news-gathering operation. He insisted that each news item be backed by at least two different sources, a requirement that was virtually impossible to fulfill and out of step with contemporary reporting practice. It was common for his staff either to miss reporting opportunities or to leak otherwise exclusive reports to other news agencies to create the impression of two separate sources. According to the Foreign News Editor of the time, Anthony Wigan, it is likely that Hole knew his staff were resorting to these tactics and, in this light, his policy can be seen as a measure to limit his own responsibilities rather than improve the quality of the news. Another reporter, Gerald Priestland, said in his 1986 autobiography: "He (Hole) took good care to make no operational decisions himself for which he might be blamed if things went wrong".

== Television news ==
In 1953, Hole was appointed to take overall charge of creating television news broadcasts. Up to that point, live news broadcasts had been in audio with the announcer/newsreader speaking over a still picture of the Big Ben clock. Once a day the Television Newsreel was shown, essentially a televised version of a cinema newsreel and intrinsically not fully up-to-date. In order to avoid what he described as the "cult of personality", Hole continued the audio-only tradition of broadcast news, making only a slight concession to the demands of television. Thus was born the News and Newsreel on 5 July 1954. This lasted about 20 minutes, the first ten being current news reports read out over captions, still pictures and occasionally a live human hand pointing to locations on a map; the remainder was filmed footage in the manner of Television Newsreel. The Spectator described this effort as a "lamentably non-telegenic presentation of television news... at once singularly clumsy and unrealistic." Hole's austere approach was challenged by the imminent arrival of the competing ITN service in 1955. Three weeks before ITN's launch, on 22 September, newsreaders Richard Baker, Kenneth Kendall and Robert Dougall appeared in vision. Hole was awarded the CBE for his services in 1956.

== Post-retirement activities ==
Hole was persuaded to move out of news production and into an administrative post in 1958 by Director-General Ian Jacob. He was replaced as news editor by Hugh Carleton Greene, who became Director-General in 1960. Within days of taking the post, Greene offered Hole a golden handshake for early retirement at the age of 51. At this point, Hole appeared to be seeking a job with the BBC's newly formed competitor, the Independent Television Authority. Greene accused him of leaking a secret BBC document to one of the ITA's strongest advocates, Norman Collins. (The document was part of the evidence that the BBC was to submit to the Pilkington Committee on Broadcasting, concerning newspaper shareholdings in Independent Television companies.)

Hole's wife, Joyce, was a lifelong friend of Elizabeth Bertie, the Countess of Abingdon and wife of Montagu Towneley-Bertie, 13th Earl of Lindsey. The Countess became especially close to Tahu and Joyce when her husband died in 1963, and when she died 15 years later she bequeathed them all her possessions with a value of over £1.5 million. The collection passed to the Victoria and Albert Museum following Joyce's death in 1986.

== Personal life ==
In 1930 Tahu Hole married Joyce Margaret Wingate in Victoria, Australia.

== Sources ==
- Crisell, Andrew (2002). An Introductory History of British Broadcasting. Routledge. pp. 98–100. ISBN 0-415-24792-6.
- Miall, Leonard (1994). Inside the BBC: British Broadcasting Characters. Weidenfeld and Nicolson. pp. 123–133. ISBN 0-297-81328-5.
- Mayor, Alfred (1997). "The Bettine, Lady Abingdon Collection, the Bequest of Mrs. TRP Hole: a Handbook". Magazine Antiques. Archived from the original on 1 September 2004.
- Tracey, Michael (1998). The Decline and Fall of Public Service Broadcasting. OUP. p. 320. ISBN 0-19-815924-2.
