= BBC Nine O'Clock News =

Former British news programme

- Final title sequence, 1999–2000 (January 2000 Variant Picture)
- Also known as: BBC News at Nine (1999–2000)
- Created by: BBC News
- Presented by: Robert Dougall (1970–1973); Richard Baker (1970–1982); Kenneth Kendall (1970–1981); Richard Whitmore (1972–1985); Michael Buerk (1976–2000); Angela Rippon (1976–1981); Peter Woods (1979–1980); John Humphrys (1981–2001); John Simpson (1981–1985); Sue Lawley (1981–1985); Moira Stuart (1981-1988); Nicholas Witchell (1981–1999); Julia Somerville (1983-1987); Andrew Harvey (1985-1989); Philip Hayton (1985-1988); Martyn Lewis (1987–1994); Debbie Thrower (1987-1988); Peter Sissons (1994–2000); George Alagiah (1999–2000)
- Theme music composer: George Fenton (7 September 1981 — 7 May 1999); David Lowe (10 May 1999 – 13 October 2000)
- Country of origin: United Kingdom
- Original language: English

Production
- Running time: 30 minutes

Original release
- Network: BBC1
- Release: 14 September 1970 – 13 October 2000

Related
- Not the Nine O'Clock News; BBC Ten O'Clock News

The BBC Nine O'Clock News is a news programme that was BBC News' flagship for more than thirty years. It was first broadcast on 14 September 1970 and ran until 13 October 2000, when it was replaced by the BBC Ten O'Clock News (later BBC News at Ten).

== History ==
A bulletin presented by John Humphrys and Julia Somerville. The bulletin design was in use from 1985 to 1988.

The Nine O'Clock News was the BBC's flagship TV news bulletin throughout its run. It was created in 1970 in response to the launch by ITN of the News at Ten. Prior to this, the BBC's main evening news broadcast had been Newsroom, which had been on BBC2 since that channel's launch in 1964, initially broadcasting at 10:30 pm, later moving to 7:30 pm; it would eventually stop airing in 1972. On BBC1, the BBC had run a shorter evening news bulletin of just 10 minutes, which in the years before Nine O'Clock News had aired at 8:50 pm

The Nine O'Clock News was the first bulletin to have a closing set of music; other bulletins would show weather forecasts at the end instead. The first week of the TV bulletin was presented by Robert Dougall, followed by Richard Baker and Kenneth Kendall, each presenting five consecutive nightly bulletins. The choice of these three was significant, echoing the original BBC television bulletins of 1955, which they had also presented. Between 13 November 1972 to 5 March 1976 the programme had two presenters. The set used by the bulletin was designed to differentiate from the day's bulletins; an example of this was in September 1981, where the Nine O'Clock News had a wooden effect whereas other bulletins used a plain blue background instead.

In 1981, traditional BBC newsreaders such as Richard Baker stopped presenting the Nine O'Clock News regularly and were replaced by journalists; initially John Humphrys and John Simpson, who were later joined by other journalists such as Julia Somerville, Sue Lawley and Michael Buerk. However, the two most significant revamps happened on 2 September 1985 and 30 October 1988.

As well as changes to presentation, the 1985 relaunch gave the bulletin its own signature tune, distinct from that of other BBC News bulletins; computer graphics were also introduced. The bulletin became double-headed again during this period, with Julia Somerville and John Humphrys becoming the main presenters, with Andrew Harvey substituting when one was unavailable and Nicholas Witchell becoming lead presenter when neither were available. Humphreys left in 1986 to present Today on BBC Radio 4, while Somerville defected to ITN the following year. Martyn Lewis became lead presenter, substituted by Witchell and Buerk. Co-presenters around this period included Harvey, Philip Hayton, Debbie Thrower and Moira Stuart

The revamp on 31 October 1988 was more about content as well as style. An increasing emphasis was placed on analysis and specialist journalism. At the same time the programme reverted to a single presenter, usually Buerk or Lewis on rotation. Humphreys and Harvey provided relief when neither were available. At this time, the programme was typically 28 minutes long.

On 13 April 1993, all of the BBC News bulletins were relaunched with a more uniform look. This programme and the late weekend bulletins were given a darker set and a stereo orchestral version of the previous mono title music. Lewis and Peter Sissons swapped jobs in 1994, Lewis becoming a main presenter of the Six O'Clock News while Sissons joined Buerk on rotation for the Nine O'Clock News. Humphreys and Witchell were relief newscasters.

A more comprehensive relaunch of all the BBC News output came on 10 May 1999, after which this programme shared a common theme and set with its daytime counterparts. During this period, the programme was advertised as the BBC News at Nine. George Alagiah became the relief newscaster around this period.

In August 2000, BBC Director-General Greg Dyke announced plans to move the bulletin to 10 pm, initially scheduled for 2001. However, in response to the impending return of ITV News at Ten, this was moved forward to 16 October 2000. As a result, the final bulletin, before the transition to the Ten O'Clock News, was presented by George Alagiah in Jerusalem and Peter Sissons in London on 13 October 2000.

The programme was broadcast on BBC One and inspired a BBC Two comedy show running in the same time slot, Not the Nine O'Clock News.
