= Nina Warhurst =

British journalist

- Born: Nina Louise Warhurst; 28 October 1980 (age 46); Wythenshawe, Greater Manchester, England
- Education: University of Edinburgh (MA); University of Westminster (PG Dip.)
- Occupations: Journalist; newsreader; television presenter; actress
- Years active: 1997–present
- Spouse: Ed Fraser (m. 2014)
- Children: 3

Nina Louise Warhurst (born 28 October 1980) is an English journalist, newsreader, television presenter and actress. She is currently the lead presenter of the BBC News at One. She was previously a business and consumer presenter on BBC Breakfast.

== Early life and education ==
Nina Louise Warhurst was born on 28 October 1980 at Wythenshawe Hospital in Wythenshawe, Greater Manchester. She grew up in Sale and later moved to Salford as a teenager.

Warhurst went to All Saints RC Primary School, and the catholic Loreto Grammar School in Altrincham, gaining nine GCSEs, and to St Bede's College, Manchester where she took A-levels in English Literature, History and Politics. At the University of Edinburgh she studied History and Politics, graduating with an MA in 2004,and later studied Broadcast journalism at the University of Westminster, graduating with a PG Dip. in 2005.

== Career ==
Warhurst began her on-screen career in an acting role in the Christmas special of Casualty in 1997, Heartbeat in 1998, and Butterfly Collectors in 1999. She began her broadcasting career on Russia Today in Moscow. In April 2007, she joined Guardian Media Group's regional television channel Channel M, presenting on Channel M Breakfast. In 2009, she moved to Channel M's weekday news programme Channel M Today, after cutbacks at station required the cancelation of Channel M Breakfast.

In 2010, Warhurst joined BBC East Midlands regional news presenting East Midlands Today. Later in 2010, she joined BBC North West regional news presenting BBC North West Tonight and Sunday Politics North West. In June 2014, she covered the 2014 FIFA World Cup in Brazil for BBC Sport. In September 2016, Warhurst was appointed political editor at BBC North West.

In 2018, Warhurst began reporting for BBC Breakfast on a freelance basis, and became a relief presenter when regular hosts were unavailable. In October 2020, she was appointed as BBC Breakfast's main business presenter, succeeding Steph McGovern.

In May 2024, it was announced that Warhurst, along with six other presenters, would start presenting the BBC News at One from its new home in Salford in June 2024. In March 2025, she was appointed as lead presenter of the BBC News at One, replacing Anna Foster.

== Awards ==
In 2017, Warhurst won a Royal Television Society award for "Best Regional Journalist" for her work on BBC North West Tonight and Sunday Politics North West.

== Personal life ==
Warhurst is married to Ed Fraser, a caterer. The couple met on holiday in Tisno, Croatia in 2013 and married on 21 March 2014 in New York City. They live in Chorlton, Manchester, and have two sons (born April 2016 and May 2018), and a daughter (born June 2023). She is a Roman Catholic and supports Manchester United.

Warhurst and her two sisters, Amy and Mel, were shown on BBC Breakfast in March 2023, speaking about their father Chris who was diagnosed with dementia in 2022; he died in July 2025.
