= Teddy Edward =

- Created by: Patrick Matthews; Mollie Matthews
- Directed by: Howard Kennett
- Narrated by: Richard Baker
- Country of origin: United Kingdom
- Original language: English
- No. of series: 1
- No. of episodes: 13

Production
- Producer: Q-3 London
- Running time: 5 minutes

Original release
- Network: BBC1
- Release: 5 January – 30 March 1973

Teddy Edward is a British television series for children. It was based on the books by Patrick and Mollie Matthews, about the travels of a teddy bear. The series of 13 episodes was first transmitted in 1973, and often repeated until 1980.

Each episode consisted of a story narrated by Richard Baker, illustrated by still photographs of Teddy Edward and his friends. Teddy Edward's travelling companions included Jasmine the Rabbit, Snowytoes the Panda and Bushy the Bushbaby.

The series was directed by Howard Kennett. The distinctive theme tune was "Glad Gadabout" by Johnny Scott. This theme tune is used as the closing musical bed by Tim Bowling on "The Saturday Sandpit" radio show on Susy Radio every Saturday 8-11am. The theme is also used as the opening musical bed on the Radcliffe and Maconie radio show on weekend mornings on BBC Radio 6 Music.

== Episodes ==
No.	Title	First broadcast
1	"The Ugly Duckling"	5 January 1973
2	"Snow"	12 January 1973
3	"Hide And Seek"	19 January 1973
4	"Rain"	26 January 1973
5	"Visitor"	2 February 1973
6	"Farm"	9 February 1973
7	"Red Indians"	16 February 1973
8	"Sandcastle"	23 February 1973
9	"Jasmine's Present"	2 March 1973
10	"Contraption"	9 March 1973
11	"Picnic"	16 March 1973
12	"Dream"	23 March 1973
13	"Cornfield"	30 March 1973

== Other countries ==
The series was exported to New Zealand, Norway, Finland, Singapore and Albania.
