= Life as I Know It =

British television series

Life As I Know It is a British teen drama series. The series was created by Robyn Forsythe and Bethany Minors, and produced by Matthew Duggan and Robyn Forsythe and premiered on Channel M on 15 May 2010 with episodes airing every Saturday at 9:30pm for the following eight weeks with repeats throughout the week at 11pm.

The series revolves around the lives of a group of students at The University of Manchester.

== Cast and crew ==
Cast

Actor	Character
Brennan Reece	Mickey Jardine
Christopher Rithin	Percy Darlington
Leila Reid	Roxi Jardine
Jennifer Quinn	Sara Chan
Emily Sinclair	Bailey Callaghan
Shafiq Mirza	Alex Ellis
Brett John	Gethin Jenkins
Ryan O'Callaghan	Greg Marr
Benjamin Cyrus-Clark	Ed Hook
Rachel Ramsay	Isobel Morton
Jenny Novitzky	Milly
Martha Brown	Linda James

Crew

Name	Position
Robyn Forsythe	Director and Producer
Matthew Duggan	Producer
Louis Hartshorn	Executive Producer

Technical crew

Name	Position
Alex Browning	Assistant Director
Lee Sharp	Sound Recordist
Varun Thapliyal	Camera Operator
Jordan Macnaught	Camera Operator
Harpall Kaura	Camera Operator and Lighting
Alish Coghlan	Runner and continuity
Rachel Longworth	Runner and continuity
Mark Fawcett	Runner and Continuity

Screenplay

Name	Position
Bethany Minors	Screenplay (Episodes 1 and 2)
Rachel Jardine	Screenplay (Episodes 3, 7 and 8)
Lousis Hartshorn	Screenplay (Episode 4)
Robyn Forsythe	Screenplay (Episode 5)
Lauren Hutchinson	Screenplay (Episode 6)

Post production team

Name	Position
Lauren Ellis	Composer
Louis Hartshorn	Music Production
Robyn Forsythe	Editor
Matthew Duggan	Website Design

== Airing ==
Life As I Know It begins airing on Channel M from Saturday 15 May 2010 at 9:30pm. The series will run every Saturday for eight weeks.

== Plot summary ==
Sara (Jennifer Quinn) acts as the show's narrator, staying out of the action while keeping a series of video blogs about her friends, studies English. Sara lives with Roxi Jardine (Leila Reid) and Bailey Callaghan (Emily Sinclair). Roxi, a drama student, is described as naïve and childish, sometimes selfish, ambitious but sweet, and someone who often takes her friends for granted.

Bailey is Roxi's best friend (and occasional love rival). She “will stop at nothing to get what she wants". She doesn't care at all about boys’ feelings. Fun, spontaneous, flirty, but can be extremely jealous. Not surprising really that she is a psychology student.

Bailey's best male friend is the suave, charming, manipulative Percy Darlington (Christopher Rithin) who cares about no-one but himself. Percy lives with Roxi's moody yet handsome boyfriend Alex (Shafiq Mirza) and Gethin (Brett John).

Then there is Roxi's twin brother Mickey (Brennan Reece) so is who laid back that he is horizontal! The 'Trisha' of the group, caring and wise and a bit of a stoner. Mickey lives with his girlfriend Linda (Martha Brown) and her best friend Isobel. Linda is always up for a good time and is always there when you need cheering up. Her passion for music is just as great as Mickey's. Then there is Isobel (Rachel Ramsay). She's hard working, can be a little spoilt at times and is easily manipulated. She also has a passion for film.

The first series is set in Spring and Summer 2010, at the end of the characters' first year of university.
