= Channel M Breakfast =

2007 British TV programme

- Genre: Features, news, sport, entertainment
- Country of origin: United Kingdom

Production
- Producer: Channel M
- Running time: 180 minutes

Original release
- Network: Channel M
- Release: 16 April 2007 – 15 May 2009

Related
- Channel M News

Channel M Breakfast is a regional breakfast television programme, produced by the Greater Manchester local television station, Channel M. Launched on Monday, 16 April 2007, and broadcast from the headquarters of Channel M at Urbis in Manchester city centre, the programme covered news, sport, features and entertainment from Greater Manchester and was the only regional television programme of its kind in the United Kingdom.

It was broadcast on weekdays between 6 am and 9 am and was presented by Byron Evans and Nikki Dean. The editor was Vanessa Williams.

The programme was axed on Friday 15 May 2009 as part of severe cutbacks to programming output and staffing levels at the station.

After the programme ended, for a short while, the first two hours (6 am to 8 am) was used to broadcast live footage of the area's traffic cameras accompanied by a simulcast of Real Radio North West, and when the live footage from the traffic cameras ceased a holding slide was shown during the Real Radio simulcasts.
