= Justin Webb =

British journalist (born 1961)

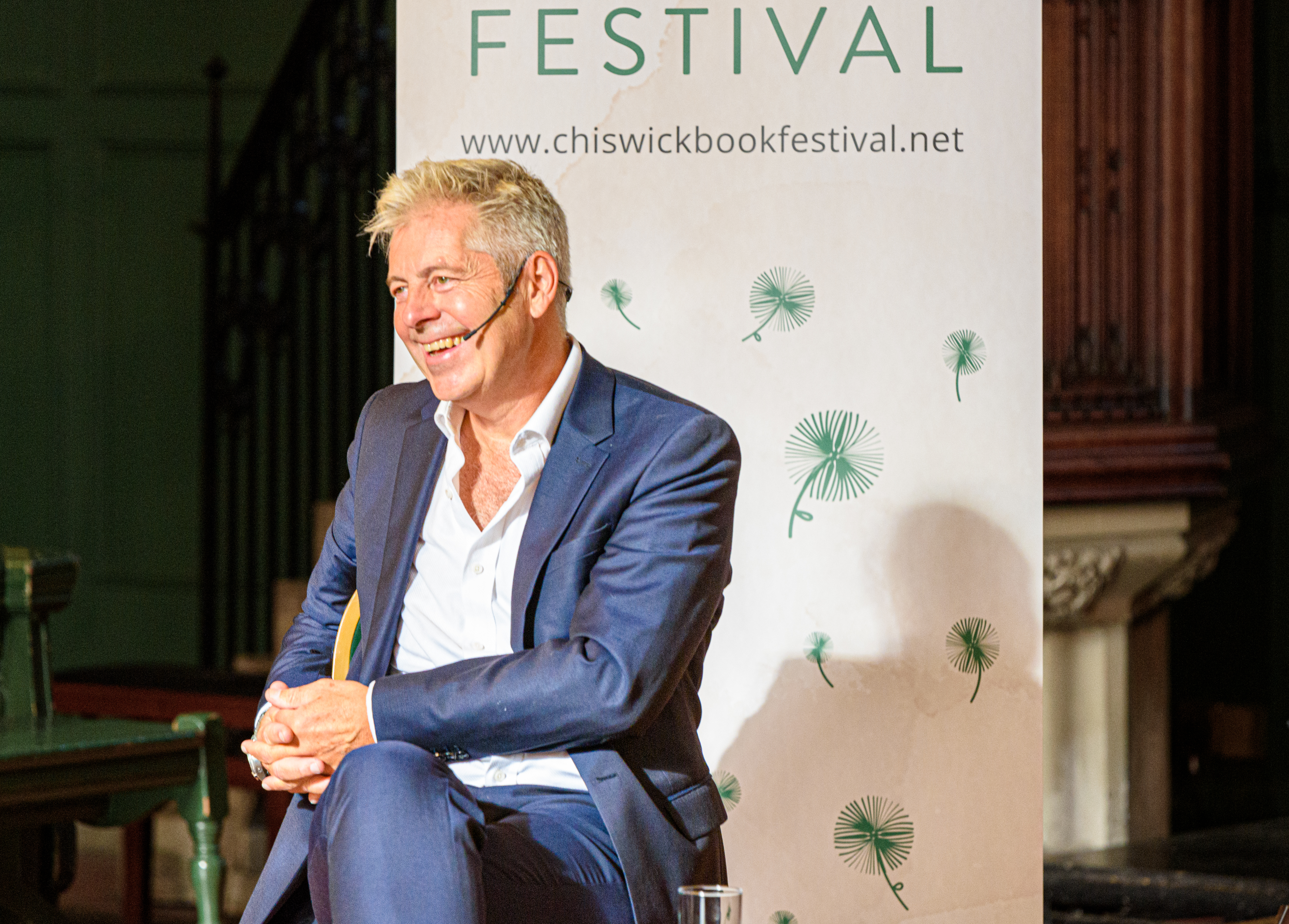
- Webb at the 2022 Chiswick Book Festival
- Born: 3 January 1961 (age 65); Portsmouth, Hampshire, England
- Education: Sidcot School
- Alma mater: London School of Economics
- Occupation: Journalist
- Years active: 1984–present
- Notable credit(s): BBC News, Today
- Spouse: Sarah Gordon
- Children: 1 son, 2 daughters
- Parents: Peter Woods (father); Gloria Crocombe (mother)
- Relatives: Gregory Woods (cousin)

Justin Oliver Webb (born Justin Oliver Prouse; born 3 January 1961) is a British journalist who has worked for the BBC since 1984. He was formerly the BBC’s North America Editor and also co-presented BBC One's Breakfast News programme. Since August 2009, he has co-presented the Today programme on BBC Radio 4, and also regularly writes for the Radio Times. Since 2022 he has been a co-presenter of the "Americast" podcast.

== Early life ==
In an article in the Radio Times in January 2011, Webb revealed that his natural father was Peter Woods who was formerly a reporter with the Daily Mirror and later became a BBC newsreader. Woods was married and Webb's mother, then Gloria Crocombe (daughter of Leonard Crocombe, first editor of the Radio Times), was a secretary at the Daily Mirror and was divorced from her first husband at the time of the affair with Woods. Webb commented that his mother's split from Woods may have been as much her doing as his, saying "I do not believe she was abandoned." Webb took the surname of his stepfather when his mother remarried in 1964.

Webb's cousin is Gregory Woods, whose mother, Charmion, was the elder sister of Webb's mother, Gloria (despite the shared surname of "Woods", Peter Woods and Gregory Woods are unrelated).

Webb grew up in Bath. He was privately educated at the independent Sidcot School, a Quaker school in Somerset, and the London School of Economics, where he wrote articles for student newspaper The Beaver.

== Career ==
Webb joined the BBC as a graduate trainee in 1984 working in Northern Ireland for BBC Radio Ulster based in Belfast. He then worked as a reporter for BBC Radio 4's Today programme, before becoming a foreign affairs correspondent based in London and covering news around the world. He reported on the Gulf War and the war in Bosnia, the collapse of the Soviet Union and the first democratic elections in South Africa.

He then became a BBC News presenter based in London, and the main presenter on BBC One's Breakfast News programme from 1992 to 1997. He also presented the BBC's One and Six O'Clock News bulletins and presented BBC Radio 4's The World Tonight from 1997–1998. From 1998 he spent three years working as the BBC's Europe correspondent based in Brussels. During that time he reported on the workings of the European Commission and Parliament, the politics surrounding Britain's decision on whether to join the single currency and the enlargement on the European Union.

In 2001, Webb moved to the United States, as the BBC's chief Washington correspondent. Much of his time was spent on local Washington Radio, including, WAMU, a public radio station, on The Diane Rehm Show. In 2006, at a seminar on impartiality, Webb said the BBC was anti-American and treated the US with "scorn and derision", according it "no moral weight". He has also presented a Radio 4 series on anti-Americanism. In December 2007, he became North American Editor for BBC News, a role newly created in time for the American presidential election of 2008. He replaced Matt Frei who moved to present the new World News America bulletin.

In August 2009, Webb returned to the UK to replace Edward Stourton on BBC Radio 4's early morning news programme Today. In October 2017, Webb disclosed that his presenting colleague Nick Robinson was being paid £100,000 more than him, for doing "essentially the same job". Webb's pay amounted to £200,000, whilst Robinson's reached £300,000, despite Webb joining the programme six years before. Webb promoted that the era of the "big beast" news anchor would likely be drawing to a close, with the "very well-paid" John Humphrys and Huw Edwards "in the firing line".

Webb received criticism for appearing to endorse the view that: "antisemitism is a bit like the way some of our people might regard anti-white racism, that actually it's a different order of racism. It's not as important – it's still bad – but it's not as important as some other forms of racism..." on the BBC on 12 March 2019; a BBC spokesperson clarified that he was "not expressing any personal view" and that Webb "is the first to admit he should have phrased his question better."

=== Transgender issues ===
In September 2021, Webb asked Liberal Democrat leader Ed Davey, if there should "not be spaces where biological males cannot go?" in reference to trans-women. Webb was later cited in a CNN article which suggested that "Anti-trans rhetoric" was rife in the British media.

In February 2022, the BBC said that Webb was not sufficiently accurate when he described the philosophy professor Kathleen Stock – who resigned following protests over her views on gender identity and transgender rights – as being "falsely" accused of transphobia. However, the BBC said that it was accurate to describe her as a subject of abuse by students.

== Personal life ==
Webb married his long-term partner Sarah Gordon in the early 2000s. They have three children together. When living in the United States, their son fell ill and was diagnosed with type 1 diabetes mellitus. As a result, Webb experienced the United States healthcare system first-hand. His son commonly joins his father in speaking about the disease. In 2012, Webb joined his son at Addenbrooke's Hospital in Cambridge, meeting Queen Camilla (then Duchess of Cornwall) as she visited the facilities. She later became a Royal Patron of the children's charity, Breakthrough T1D, a charity which Webb supports on a regular basis.

In August 2009, Webb returned to Britain with his wife and children. They currently live in Camberwell, South London. In 2008, his mother, Gloria, died and he inherited her home in Bath, Somerset.

== Bibliography ==
- Webb, Justin (2008). Have a Nice Day. Short Books, London. ISBN 9781906021702.
- Webb, Justin (2011). Notes on Them and Us: From the Mayflower to Obama – the British, the Americans and the Special Essential Relationship. Short Books Ltd. ISBN 9781907595431.
- Webb, Justin (2013). Cheers, America: How an Englishman Learned to Love America. Atria Books/Marble Arch Press. ISBN 9780993087905.
- Foreword in Young, Debbie (2014). Coming to Terms with Type 1 Diabetes: One Family's Story of Life After Diagnosis. Hawkesbury Press. ISBN 9781476730196.
- Webb, Justin (2022). The Gift of a Radio: My Childhood and other Train Wrecks. Doubleday. ISBN 9780857527721.

Media offices
Preceded by None	North America Editor: BBC News; 2007–2009	Succeeded by Mark Mardell
