= Sara Coburn =

Journalist from Northern Ireland (born 1962)

Sara Coburn (born 25 December 1962 in Northern Ireland) is a journalist, and a business presenter on BBC Breakfast and the BBC News channel.

== Career ==
Coburn joined the BBC in 1985. Her first role was as a reporter with BBC Radio 4's The World at One and PM programmes. She began to specialise in business journalism in 1987 when she joined Channel 4's Business Daily as a producer, but returned to the BBC in 1989 to present BBC1's flagship Business Breakfast alongside Paul Burden. She co-presented with Burden for several years, working on both domestic and international business stories.

Coburn later became a business news presenter on BBC Breakfast and the BBC News channel, interviewing company bosses, politicians and commentators about business-related subjects, such as corporate news, stock markets and personal finance.
