= BBC UK regional TV on satellite =

The BBC broadcasts all of the BBC One and BBC Two regional variations on digital satellite television from the SES Astra satellites at 28.2° east; providing local news programmes and other regional programming with local continuity and presentation for Northern Ireland, Scotland and Wales. The BBC refers to the whole UK regional network as "BBC Nations and Regions".

The local version of BBC One is normally on channel 101, with BBC Two on channel 102. On Freesat equipment, users enter a postcode during initial set up—this determines the assigned local version. On Sky equipment, the address to which the viewing card was issued determines the correct local version—without any viewing card the London versions are shown by default. All other national and regional versions are shown in the EPG.

== History ==
From the launch of digital satellite on 1 October 1998 until 31 March 2001, there were four variants (England, Scotland, Wales and Northern Ireland) of both BBC One and BBC Choice carried on all digital platforms. Only one version of BBC Two was available digitally, and this was shown throughout the UK. The BBC English Regions gradually became available via Digital Terrestrial Television (Freeview) over the next few years, as did the national versions of BBC Two.

On digital satellite television, regional news programmes on BBC One were replaced by UK Today until 28 January 2002 when additional transponder space was allocated to the English regions. Initially programmes were available as an interactive service via the red button and only for the five largest English regions; London, North West, South, West Midlands and Yorkshire On 30 May 2003 the BBC stopped encrypting its TV channels on digital satellite and made all regions available as standard, full-time channels.

== BBC regional services and channel numbers ==
=== BBC One ===
Regional news inserts are broadcast during BBC Breakfast along with 15-minute shows on weekdays after national news bulletins at 1.30 pm and 10.30 pm, along with a 30-minute show at 6.30 pm. On weekends the availability of a regional news bulletin following the national news depends on the timeslot.

In England the only other regional opt-out is a weekly Sunday morning political programme Sunday Politics. Scotland, Wales and Northern Ireland continue to broadcast a variety of programmes targeted at their nation and network programmes are often rescheduled to accommodate them.

BBC One HD started broadcasting on 3 November 2010. A Northern Ireland variant that launched on 24 October 2012, a Scottish variation that launched on 14 January 2013 and a Welsh variation that launched on 29 January 2013. From 23 January 2023, the English regions began rolling-out in high definition on satellite, starting with South on the same day and ending with South East on 23 February. At the same time as the HD roll-out, the standard definition regions began closing, with a UK-wide variant of BBC One remaining until all BBC standard definition services closed on satellite on 8 January 2024.

BBC One Nation/Region	News programme	Freesat	Sky
London HD	BBC London	950	954
South West (Channel Islands) HD	BBC Spotlight/BBC Channel Islands News	951	968
East Midlands HD	BBC East Midlands Today	952	960
East HD	BBC Look East	953	961
North West HD	BBC North West Today/BBC North West Tonight	955	958
North East and Cumbria HD	BBC Look North (Newcastle)	956	955
South East HD	BBC South East Today	959	963
South HD	BBC South Today	961	964
South West (Plymouth) HD	BBC Spotlight	962	967
West Midlands HD	BBC Midlands Today	963	959
West HD	BBC Points West	965	966
Yorkshire HD	BBC Look North (Leeds)	966	956
Yorkshire and Lincolnshire HD	BBC Look North (Hull)	967	957
Scotland HD	BBC Reporting Scotland	973	977
Wales HD	BBC Wales Today	976	978
Northern Ireland HD	BBC Newsline	978	979

=== BBC Two ===
Three regional variations of BBC Two exist – Northern Ireland, Wales and a network variant covering the rest of the UK. Each variant is also available in high-definition, although due to capacity issues the Northern Ireland variant wasn't available on satellite initially, but launched on there in January 2023. A variation for Scotland was available until 2019 when it was replaced by BBC Scotland. The standard definition variant of Northern Ireland closed on satellite on 23 January 2023, Wales SD closed on 6 February 2023 and Network SD closed on 8 January 2024.

BBC Two Nation	Freesat	Sky
Network HD	949	970 (NI); 980 (Wales)
Northern Ireland HD	974	970
Wales HD	971	980
