= Code XIII =

Code XIII was a regional rugby league programme on Channel M.

The programme began in the 2006 season and focused on teams playing in the Greater Manchester area such as Salford City Reds, Wigan Warriors, Leigh Centurions, Rochdale Hornets, Oldham Roughyeds and Swinton Lions.

A spin-off series entitled Code XIII: Grassroots focused on local amateur rugby league.

The programme's producers decided not to produce a series for the 2009 season. In 2009, Channel M, which was running at a loss, also cut more than half of its staff and scaled back its schedule in an effort to reduce costs.
