= Breakfast Time (British TV programme) =

Television series

- Genre: Breakfast television
- Presented by: Frank Bough (1983–1987); Selina Scott (1983–1986); Nick Ross (1983–1986); Mike Smith (1983–1986); Francis Wilson (1983–1989); Sue Cook (1983–1986); Fern Britton (1983–1984); Debbie Greenwood (1985–1986); Sally Magnusson (1985–1989); John Mountford; Jeremy Paxman (1986–1989); John Stapleton (1988–1989); Jill Dando (1988–1989); Kirsty Wark (1988–1989)
- Country of origin: United Kingdom
- Original language: English

Production
- Running time: 150 minutes (1983–1986); 120 minutes (1988–1989)

Original release
- Network: BBC1
- Release: 17 January 1983 – 29 September 1989

Related
- Breakfast News

Breakfast Time was British television's first national breakfast television programme, launching 15 days before ITV's service, TV-am. It was broadcast from 17 January 1983 until 29 September 1989 on BBC1 across the United Kingdom. Previously, the only regular broadcasts during the breakfast period were programmes for the Open University.

On 2 October 1989, the show became Breakfast News.

== Format ==
Breakfast Time mixed hard news with accessible features, creating a cosy feel, with sofas and bright colours. The presenters typically wore casual clothes instead of formal suits, in contrast to the regular news broadcasts. Frank Bough, Selina Scott and Nick Ross anchored the show, with regulars such as Russell Grant (astrology) and Diana Moran, also known as the "Green Goddess" due to the colour of her leotard.

The news was read by Debbie Rix, while each region opted out of the main programme at quarter past and quarter to the hour to broadcast short regional news bulletins. Initially, viewers in London and the South East were provided with their regional news by one of the main Breakfast Time presenters rather than a regional presentation team. This continued until autumn 1985 when the new London and South East regional news programme BBC London Plus started to provide the regional news opt-outs during the programme.

The weather slot (known as Window on the Weather) was presented by Francis Wilson, and reflected the rest of the show in having a more laid-back feel. Window on the Weather actually introduced modern, projection-style graphics some two years ahead of the transition from the old-style magnetic boards used in the BBC's main weather bulletins. Whilst Wilson was the resident weather presenter on the show, other presenters such as Michael Fish, Bill Giles and Ian McCaskill stood in during Wilson's absence.

Breakfast Time aired from 6:30 am until 9:00 am each weekday morning. On Monday 18 February 1985, the programme changed to a later time slot of 6:50 am until 9:20 am to compete better with a revitalised TV-am in the post-9am slot, and the regional news opt-outs moved to :57 and :27 minutes past the hour.

On Monday 10 November 1986, Breakfast Time was relaunched with a news desk and presenters in suits. Journalists such as Jeremy Paxman and Kirsty Wark joined the team as the programme shifted its tone to analysis of the morning's news stories, especially politics. The new look programme also started later, running from 7:00 am until any time between 8:30 am and 8:55 am.

== Comparisons with TV-am ==
ITV's breakfast service, TV-am, launched just over two weeks later. Despite TV-am's high-profile presenters, Breakfast Time proved more popular with viewers.

Breakfast Time notably broadcast continuous live coverage of the Brighton hotel bombing at the Conservative Party conference in 1984. TV-am, meanwhile, was castigated by the broadcasting authority for its poor coverage of the event. TV-am had just one crew covering the conference, but they had been called back to London to cover a train crash in Wembley. Only John Stapleton was present in Brighton, and had to make do with phoning in reports from a public phone box, with a picture of him shown on screen, along with an archive picture of the hotel.

Unlike TV-am, Breakfast Time was only broadcast on weekdays; weekend breakfast transmissions on BBC1 continued to consist of programmes from the Open University. However, on two occasions, weekend editions of the programme were broadcast. They were to provide coverage of the Zeebrugge ferry disaster and the Hillsborough disaster.

== Olympic Breakfast Time ==
The 1984 and 1988 Summer Olympic Games took place during the period when Breakfast Time was on air and during both Games, with the exception of news, weather and regional news, the programme was entirely devoted to Olympic coverage. In 1984, the time difference meant that Olympic Breakfast Time was given over to highlights of the overnight action. Frank Bough presented the programme with David Icke providing "Olympic Action Summaries" at 7.05, 8.05 and 8.50. In 1988, Olympic Breakfast Time coincided with the middle of the afternoon local time so the programme mixed live coverage with overnight highlights. Steve Rider was the presenter with David Icke providing Olympic summaries at 6.30, 7.30 and 8.30am. During both Games, Olympic Breakfast Time was also broadcast over the weekend, although the Sunday edition in 1984 started at the later time of 7am. The weekend editions also included news summaries, albeit hourly rather than every 30 minutes.
