= Westminster Live =

BBC Television weekly political programme

- The final programme titles ( Promax & BDA silver award winning) - designer : Louise Smith
- Genre: Current Affairs & Politics
- Presented by: Nick Robinson; Iain Macwhirter
- Country of origin: United Kingdom
- Original language: English

Original release
- Network: BBC Two
- Release: 21 November 1989 – 19 December 2002

Westminster Live is a weekly television programme that focused on political developments within the Parliament of the United Kingdom. The programme began on 21 November 1989 on the same day as television cameras were first allowed into the House of Commons. The programme lasted until 19 December 2002 when it was succeeded by Daily Politics.

The programme was presented by Nick Robinson and Iain Macwhirter. Robinson left the BBC to join ITV and Macwhirter went on to report on the Scottish Parliament in Holyrood Live.

The first presenter was Vivian White and later hosts included Nick Ross and Diana Madill.

The programme was originally presented from a small studio opposite the Houses of Parliament, but in later years it came from the BBC's nearby Millbank base.

It focused on coverage from Parliament far more than its successor.
