= Breakfast News =

- BBC Breakfast News final logo, from 2 June 1997 to 15 September 2000
- Genre: Breakfast television
- Created by: BBC News
- Presented by: Various (see below)
- Country of origin: United Kingdom
- Original language: English

Original release
- Network: BBC One
- Release: 2 October 1989 – 15 September 2000

Related
- Breakfast Time; BBC Breakfast

Breakfast News is a breakfast news programme which first aired on BBC1 on 2 October 1989. The programme was previously known as Breakfast Time. It was planned to launch on 18 September 1989 but was held back by two weeks due to technical issues with its new studio. The programme adopted a rolling news format with news summaries every 15 minutes plus weather and regional news every 30 minutes. Other features included a review of the day's newspapers and regular business news updates.

From 22 November 1989, following the commencement of televised coverage of the House of Commons, the 8 am to 8.15 am part of the programme was simulcast on BBC2 as part of a new news hour which encompassed a review of the previous day's proceedings at Westminster. The final edition of Breakfast News aired on 15 September 2000 and on 2 October 2000 it relaunched as BBC Breakfast.

== Presentation ==
The programme went through three main visual changes. The initial look lasted until 8 April 1993. The 13 April 1993 revamp saw the programme presented from the same set as the One, Six and Nine O'Clock News bulletins. A further and final revamp took place on 2 June 1997 when 'BBC' was shorn from its title, and on-screen it became known as simply Breakfast News. It was during this final period that the tone began to shift, with the return of a sofa set, alongside more features, and more interaction between the presenting team.

== Broadcasting ==
BBC Breakfast News only aired from Mondays to Fridays with no weekend editions, although weekend editions were shown during the early stages of the 1991 Gulf War. This compares to their ITV counterparts TV-am and later GMTV who were on the air seven days a week. However on 21 September 1991 the BBC launched a short 5 minute weekend breakfast news summary. The Saturday edition aired at 7:25 am to commence their Saturday schedule. The bulletin was not presented from the Breakfast News set, but from the main BBC News set based in the newsroom.

The Saturday breakfast bulletin was dropped from the schedules in the autumn of 1999 with the last Saturday morning bulletin airing on Saturday 11 September 1999. BBC Two had already been broadcasting an hour of news from BBC News 24, branded as "Weekend 24" on Saturday mornings from 8 am to 9 am since 31 January 1998, over two months after the launch of BBC News 24 and so the short Saturday breakfast news summary on BBC One started to become redundant. On Sundays the short morning bulletin would air at 9:10 am and this would later be accompanied with the Breakfast with Frost programme which launched on 3 January 1993. This bulletin ran until it was replaced by the Sunday edition of Weekend 24 on BBC Two premiered on 1 February 1998.

== Business Breakfast ==
Business Breakfast was a daily news programme which aired between 6 am and 7 am, directly preceding Breakfast News. Initially the programme aired as part of Breakfast News broadcasting between 6:34 am and 6:55 am. From Tuesday 4 January 2000, Business Breakfast was subsumed into Breakfast News with Breakfast News starting at 6 am each weekday. Business Breakfast remained as a feature, not a separate programme, however, with business news a key feature in the first hour of the programme.

== Breakfast News Extra ==
Breakfast News Extra launched on 5 February 1996, as an attempt to compete against Lorraine Kelly on GMTV. The programme was presented from the Breakfast News office, on a blue sofa initially, and hosted by Juliet Morris. It was short-lived, and was cancelled in the summer of 1997 with the last edition shown on 29 August 1997. By this stage the main BBC Breakfast News had undergone a dramatic visual revamp with a new studio set which included sofas alongside the main presentation desk.

== Notable presenters ==
- Nicholas Witchell
- Jill Dando
- Sally Magnusson
- Sara Coburn
- Laurie Mayer
- Justin Webb
- Andrew Harvey
- Juliet Morris
- Fiona Bruce
- Kirsty Wark
- Noel Thompson
- Michael Peschardt
- John Nicolson
- Huw Edwards
- Sophie Raworth
- Tanya Beckett
- Jeremy Bowen
- Julie Etchingham
- Liz MacKean

== See also ==
- BBC
- TV-am
- GMTV
