= UK Today =

- UK Today titles
- Genre: National News

Production
- Producer: BBC News
- Production locations: Studio N6/N8, BBC Television Centre, London
- Running time: 30 minutes (main bulletin)

Original release
- Network: BBC One (in England Digital only); BBC Two (short bulletins); BBC News 24
- Release: 1998 – 25 January 2002

UK Today is a BBC television news programme shown on digital satellite and digital terrestrial versions of BBC One and BBC Two. It consisted of a round up of stories from the BBC's various local news programmes where it had not initially been possible to show regional variations. The programme was eventually replaced by digital feeds of each regional news service.

== History ==
When the BBC started digital broadcasts, the various English regional versions of BBC One and Two were not available. BBC One carried variants only for Northern Ireland, Scotland and Wales, whilst no variations were broadcast for BBC Two; instead it had been decided to carry four variants of the new BBC Choice.

Lack of English variations on Satellite was due to a single broadcast feed being able to cover the entirety of England (in reality it could cover much of north and western Europe) whilst on digital terrestrial it was due to the regional broadcast centres in England not yet being equipped to 'opt in and out' of the digital network when digital terrestrial broadcasts began in 1998.

This presented a problem with two obvious solutions – either just show the BBC South East version of the channels (already used as a 'sustaining feed' in case of failure at the regional centres), or create new programming to fill the gaps. The decision was taken to go with the second option, although during non-news programming, such as the regional political slot, the South East region feed was aired.

Despite the name, UK Today very rarely broadcast to the whole of the UK as BBC One Scotland, BBC One Northern Ireland, and BBC One Wales were available with their own news programming from the very start of digital enjoying their own satellite feeds and being fully equipped for digital terrestrial. Only BBC Two would carry UK Today to the whole of the UK.

In 2000, BBC Breakfast, a simulcast programme between BBC One and BBC News 24 was launched. Regional opt-outs on BBC News 24 carried UK Today across the UK.

Main bulletins at 1.30 pm and 6.30 pm were originally broadcast from within the BBC News 24 studio (N8), and simulcast on that channel, although the set was later moved to the same studio as the BBC One news bulletins (N6).

== Gradual demise ==
UK Today was gradually replaced on BBC One as regional centres were upgraded for digital terrestrial broadcasting and the non-England versions of BBC Two went digital on both satellite and terrestrial in 2001, replacing the four regional variants of BBC Choice. In 2002 the satellite version of BBC One England started carrying the London region's programme, BBC London News, although an interactive service did allow viewers to select one of four alternate regional programmes, including South Today and North West Tonight, for the main 6.30 pm news bulletin. In May 2003 all regional services were made available to satellite viewers by broadcasting 18 separate feeds of BBC One; one for each region.

== Aftermath ==
By the early part of the 2000s it was decided not to carry any regional broadcasting on BBC Two in England as it is not seen as cost-effective to create digital versions of these regions. On satellite, this would have meant as many individual feeds of BBC Two as BBC One whilst in the case of digital terrestrial, a decision to encode all BBC services other than BBC One using the more efficient statistical multiplexing technique made it technically and economically much harder to provide variations without either equipping each regional centre with costly equipment or using the same method as for BBC One and suffering reduced picture quality as a result. Consequently, short BBC London bulletins continued to be broadcast throughout England on BBC Two until all remaining England regional programming ended.

In July 2003, all regional news bulletins were moved to BBC One and in 2006, the last remaining regional programme, The Super League Show, shown in some northern regions, was also moved. Also on 2006, during the 2006 Commonwealth Games, BBC Breakfast was shown on BBC Two so regional opt-outs on the digital variant in England were replaced by a newspaper review. After this, although it remained technically possible for most regions to opt out on analogue, any variation in programming on BBC Two in England finished although during the Wimbledon tennis competitions of 2008, a scheduled news bulletin was moved to BBC Two. As some regions had already switched to digital-only TV, these areas received BBC London News instead of their local news. Also, the teletext service Ceefax continued to carry regional content on BBC Two until analogue switch-off in 2012.

== See also ==
- BBC UK regional TV on satellite
