= Channel M =

Television station based in Manchester, England

- Country: United Kingdom

Programming
- Picture format: 576i 16:9 (SDTV)

Ownership
- Owner: GMG Regional Media (Guardian Media Group)

History
- Launched: 14 February 2000
- Closed: 16 April 2012
- Former names: Manchester Student Television

Availability (at time of closure)

Terrestrial
- Freeview: Channel 200 (Manchester only)

Channel M was a regional television station in England which broadcast to the Greater Manchester area between 2000 and 2012. The station, originally Manchester Student Television, was owned and operated by the GMG Regional Media division of Guardian Media Group.

== Coverage ==
Originally an RSL station and the sixth such station to launch, Channel M was at first primarily available free-to-air on analogue terrestrial TV through channel 39 in central and south Manchester. The licence was awarded in 1997 to a group formed by managing director Philip Reevell in 1997, and was the largest city in terms of population to receive an RSL television station at the time.

The channel began broadcasting free-to-air in conjunction with the University of Salford in 2000.

In 2004, Channel M launched on the NTL (now part of Virgin Media) digital cable platform, around Greater Manchester, mid-Lancashire and Cheshire. In April 2006 Channel M launched on digital satellite, the first RSL channel to do so, where it was broadcast free-to-air across Western Europe from Astra 28.2°E and was available on Sky. The channel was removed from Sky channel 203 and Virgin Media channel 878 on 1 September 2010.

The channel became the first broadcaster in the region to offer its programmes on demand via broadband TV on its website, which closed down in late March 2010.

In January 2009, the broadcasting regulator Ofcom announced that Channel M would receive a licence to broadcast on Freeview after digital switchover. On 2 December 2009, Channel M ceased broadcasting on analogue UHF channel 39 (615 MHz). Around this time, the station announced plans to launch on Freeview (digital terrestrial television); broadcasts began on Monday 12 April 2010.

== Programming ==
Originally, the main sources of programming were CHUM, Euronews, Channel M's in-house productions and the University of Salford with Interference, Gloves Off and Hitting Home, a documentary series. These were made in house by students and staff at the university. Canada-sourced output from CHUM was gradually replaced by in-house Channel M Productions as the station developed more local programming, particularly following the station's launch on digital satellite services in April 2006. Major cutbacks saw most of the station's non-news output axed in May 2009. Remaining GMG production ceased on 19 March 2010, leaving the station with a schedule of archive and acquired output.

=== Salford University input / output ===
The history of Channel M can be traced back to the Broadcasting Act 1996 which made provision for six local restricted television service licences (RSL) to be issued around the UK. The Manchester RSL was awarded to the University of Salford in 1997 and the channel began life as Manchester Student Television (MSTV), operated by a consortium that included the university and Guardian Media Group, amongst others. All partners started producing content in the autumn of 1998, and this was stockpiled in advance of launch on 14 February 2000. Programming produced by the University of Salford continued to be broadcast on the station until shortly before its closure. Featured programming included Reel North (short films), Zeitgeist (arts magazine), Grey Matters (studio debate), Hitting Home (documentary) and Wildtrack (wildlife documentary), four of which won a total of nine Royal Television Society awards. Interference, an arts show, helped launch careers of presenters and comedians, including OJ Borg and Jason Manford. Gloves Off was a student debate programme that ran for four years.

=== Guardian Media Group output ===
From 2004 until July 2009, the station's flagship programme was the 5pm weeknight edition of Channel M News (produced in conjunction with the Manchester Evening News), which later expanded to include breakfast, lunchtime and late evening bulletins as well as a weekly review programme and occasional live specials.

Until May 2009, GMG also produced entertainment programmes including the weekly entertainment round-up City Life, the comedy talk-show Frank Sidebottom's Proper Telly Show, and regular music coverage. Programming such as the weekly music show City Life Social and video/computer game review series Re:Loaded helped Channel M to gain viewers nationally.

City Life Social, The Great Northern Music Show and In Session were Channel M's main music programmes, often presented by Gerry McLaughlin with Clint Boon as a stand-in host. These programmes usually featured live, acoustic or "unplugged" studio and outside broadcast performances from alternative and indie bands.

Former BBC Radio Manchester host, Granada presenter and Factory Records boss Tony Wilson was due to present a Friday evening music and entertainment show called The New Friday, produced by former Granada producer and BBC Radio Manchester host Eamonn O'Neill. However, this programme was postponed after Wilson became terminally ill with cancer. Wilson died in August 2007 and the plans for The New Friday were soon abandoned.

City Life Social (previously City Centre Social) then became the station's flagship music show, as Channel M shifted towards a greater focus on live performances within programmes. This policy continued until the music department ceased production in May 2009, shortly after the station announced severe cutbacks in staff and programming.

== Studios ==
The channel was originally based at smaller studios in the Triangle shopping mall and the later at the Printworks entertainment complex in Manchester city centre, until Channel M moved to the former Urbis museum in August 2005.

Channel M News was initially pre-recorded until live bulletins were launched in May 2006. The studio's position on the ground floor of Urbis in Manchester city centre gave a live elevated background shot of the area around Cathedral Gardens and Manchester Victoria railway station.

The station's production team were based at the offices of the Stockport Express before moving to Urbis in March 2006. In November 2007, Channel M's news team moved again to the MEN Media headquarters at Spinningfields, which was used as a secondary studio base for some news bulletins.

The station later moved its in-house transmission and administration facilities from Urbis to GMG Radio's headquarters at Laser House in Salford Quays. Studio content produced by Salford University was originally produced at the Adelphi Building in Peru Street, Salford, but later moved to new facilities at MediaCity:UK in Salford Quays.

== Fate ==
On 27 April 2009, Channel M's then-chief executive Mark Dodson announced that the station was looking to make 41 redundancies from its 74 staff and restrict weekday live programming from four programmes (totalling six hours of output) to one three-hour news magazine programme, broadcast between 4pm and 7pm, in order to cut losses. A company review carried out by the Guardian Media Group before the announcement recommended that the station should focus on news and general sport programming.

Channel M also ceased all of its stand-alone entertainment, sport and features programming as well as the weekday breakfast show (which was, for a short time, replaced by live footage of the area's traffic cameras accompanied by a simulcast of Real Radio North West) and the lunchtime and evening news bulletins. News and sport coverage was incorporated into Channel M Today which launched on Monday 13 July 2009, broadcast on weekdays from 4pm to 7pm and presented by chief news anchor Andy Crane, alongside a rotating team of sports and features presenters.

In February 2010, the station's owners Guardian Media Group were reported to be in talks with staff regarding options for Channel M's future after the company sold off 32 of its regional newspaper titles, including the Manchester Evening News, to Trinity Mirror for £44.8 million. The following month, the station announced its remaining in-house regional programmes, including the flagship magazine show Channel M Today, would cease production by Friday 19 March 2010. 29 of the station's 33 staff were made redundant.

Several ex-GMG employees later secured consultancy positions working on Salford University productions at the IMC. The station then broadcast a mix of archived programming, original output from Salford University and simulcasts of Euronews and Real Radio North West, alongside some new programming from independent and third party producers. The station's in-house transmission and administration facilities were later based at Laser House in Salford Quays and managed by GMG's regional radio division.

By the start of 2012, all remaining local programming had ended, resulting in a schedule consisting of simulcasts of Real Radio North West and Euronews, and acquired programming from The Community Channel.

On 16 April 2012, GMG Radio announced its decision to close Channel M after 12 years of broadcasting. The station's owners said UK government plans for localised television services would not allow the station to run a commercially viable service in the future. The channel ceased broadcasting on Freeview the same day, leading to three redundancies.

By 2023, That's Media Group, the parent of That's TV, had acquired the Freeview capacity that had been created for Channel M and was using it to broadcast music videos.

== Programmes ==
- 30 Minutes of...
- 4 Manchester
- The Biker Show
- Campus Cooking
- Channel M Breakfast
- Channel M Lunchtime News
- Channel M Late News
- Channel M News Live
- Channel M News Review
- Channel M Playlist
- Channel M Plays Pop
- Channel M Today
- City Centre Social
- The City Debate Show
- City Life
- City Life Comedian of the Year
- City Life Social
- Code XIII
- Code XIII: Grassroots
- Community Focus
- Cookin' Impossible
- Crime Team
- Fashion Face Off
- FC United
- Frank Sidebottom's Proper Telly Show
- The Football Debate Show
- Gloves Off (debate programme).
- The Great Manchester Football Show
- The Great Northern Music Show
- Grey Matters
- Hitting Home
- The Homesmine (previously Homesearch)
- I Love Manchester
- In Session
- Interference (entertainment)
- Inside MCFC
- The Jobsmine (previously Jobsearch)
- The Lancashire Cricket Show
- The Latics Football Show
- Life As I Know It
- Made in Manchester
- Manchester Exchange
- Manchester Fight Night
- Manchester Unlimited
- M:usic Live
- The Phoenix Ice Hockey Show
- Reel North
- Re:Loaded
- The Run
- Seconds Out
- Sports Central
- Style In The City
- Talking Sharks
- Teleshopping
- The United Debate Show
- Wildtrack
- Zeitgeist

=== Imported programmes ===
Programmes produced by CHUM TV included:

- Arts and Minds
- Best! Movies! Ever!
- Egos and Icons
- Much Music
- Much In Your Space
- Fashion Television
- In Fashion
- Star at The Movies

Other providers:

- Relays of the ITN News Channel (2000)
- Gillette World Sport (Sunset+Vine)
- Toyota World of Wildlife (Sunset+Vine)
- Movies, Games and Videos (Capricorn Programmes)
- MUTV highlights

== Royal Television Society (North West) Awards ==
Channel M programmes were short-listed for RTS North West Awards on numerous occasions since 2001 and won a total of eight times - once for GMG-produced output (Andy Crane) and seven times for the University of Salford. In addition to programme awards, the station's website won the RTS Best Online award in 2008.

=== Programme winners ===
- Hitting Home: Final Clearance - Best Cable, Satellite or RSL programme (2001); University of Salford for Channel M
- Channel M - Best Newcomers (2005) (The RTS were 'unable to split' the three nominations for the award - GMG reporter Laura Fogg, Salford University presenter Gerry McLaughlin and the production team for Reel North - so instead the Society presented a generic award to Channel M. Effectively, all three nominations lost out on an award, even though they all came joint-first).
- Hitting Home: Displaced - Best Regional Programme (2005); University of Salford for Channel M
- Reel North - Best Regional Programme (2006); University of Salford for Channel M
- Nigel Hoar & Angela Byrne - Best Newcomers (2008); University of Salford for Channel M
- Zeitgeist - Best Low Budget Programme (2009); University of Salford for Channel M
- Andy Crane - Best Regional Presenter (2009); Guardian Media Group
- Reel North - "Overcoming Adversity" - Best Regional Programme (2010) (produced by the University of Salford).
- Wildtrack - Best Low Budget Programme (2011); University of Salford for Channel M
