= Channel M News =

English TV news service

- Also known as: Channel M Lunchtime News; Channel M News at Nine; Channel M News Review
- Genre: Regional News
- Presented by: Andy Crane (Chief anchor)
- Country of origin: England

Production
- Producer: Channel M
- Running time: 5pm bulletin: 60 minutes Review: 30 minutes

Original release
- Network: Channel M
- Release: 2004 – 10 July 2009

Channel M News was a regional television news service covering the ten boroughs of Greater Manchester, North West England produced by Channel M, partly in conjunction with the Manchester Evening News.

== History ==
Launched in 2004, Channel M News aired each weekday evening alongside a weekly review programme and occasional documentary specials. Breakfast, lunchtime and late evening news bulletins were also produced throughout the programme's run.

Channel M News was produced and broadcast from the station's studios at Urbis and the MEN Media newsroom at Spinningfields in Manchester City Centre. The programme had previously been pre-recorded from small temporary studios in The Triangle shopping centre, The Printworks entertainment complex and Urbis before going live from a new, larger studio at Urbis in May 2006, looking out towards Cathedral Gardens and the Manchester Victoria railway station.

The final evening edition of Channel M News was broadcast on Friday 10 July 2009. From Monday 13 July 2009, the station's news coverage was incorporated into Channel M Today, a three-hour topical magazine programme on weekdays.
