= Newsroom (British TV programme) =

- Genre: News and current affairs
- Presented by: John Timpson; Peter Woods; Robert Dougall
- Country of origin: United Kingdom
- Original language: English

Production
- Production locations: Alexandra Palace (1964–1969); Television Centre (1969–1972)
- Running time: 30 minutes

Original release
- Network: BBC2
- Release: 20 April 1964 – 10 November 1972

Related
- News Extra

Newsroom launched in 1964 – in 1968 it became the UK's first colour television news programme.

Newsroom is a news programme. It was the BBC2 channel's main news programme between 20 April 1964 and 10 November 1972.

== History ==
The programme began on the day BBC2 started transmission, 20 April 1964, and continued until the end of 10 November 1972. The programme was initially broadcast late at night (after 10.30 pm) but was moved to a 7.30 pm–8.00 pm time-slot in 1968. The schedule change was followed by a switch from monochrome to colour transmission, in which Newsroom became the first British news programme to be shown in colour.

Until September 1969 it originated from BBC News Studio A at Alexandra Palace, and after this date from Studio N2 at Television Centre.

Various newsreaders presented Newsroom over the years, including John Timpson, Peter Woods (from the first night) and Robert Dougall.
