= Robert Dougall =

English broadcaster and ornithologist (1913–1999)

Robert Dougall MBE
- Born: Robert Neill Dougall; 27 November 1913; Croydon, Surrey, England
- Died: 18 December 1999 (aged 86); Southwold, Suffolk, England
- Occupations: Broadcaster; Ornithologist
- Years active: 1934–1999
- Spouse: Nan Byram (m. 1947)
- Children: 2
- Relatives: Rose Elinor Dougall (granddaughter)

Robert Neill Dougall MBE (27 November 1913 – 18 December 1999) was an English broadcaster and ornithologist, mainly known as a newsreader and announcer. He started his career in the BBC's accounts department before moving on to become a radio announcer for the BBC Empire Service in 1934. Dougall covered the first three years of the Second World War for the corporation, before resigning in 1942 to join the Royal Naval Volunteer Service.

Dougall returned to the BBC after demobilisation, first for the Far Eastern Service in Singapore and then for the BBC Light Programme in London. He started his career in television as a newsreader in the 1950s and retired in December 1973. Dougall served as president of the Royal Society for the Protection of Birds (RSPB) for five years, from 1970 to 1975, during which time the charity's membership increased from 50,000 to 250,000. He was appointed Member of the Most Excellent Order of the British Empire (MBE) in the 1965 Birthday Honours.

== Early life ==
Dougall was born on 27 November 1913 in South Croydon, Surrey. He was the son of a City of London worker from Glasgow, Scotland. Dougall had two older sisters, and moved frequently in his childhood before settling in the seaside town of Brighton because he had asthma. From 1923 to 1931, he attended Whitgift School in Surrey; he did not carry on to university despite having some talent in languages, specifically French and German.

Dougall left Whitgift School at the age of 16 when work became scarce during the Great Depression. Through his father's contacts in the city, he was recruited as an accounts clerk by the Deloitte firm of accountants that were responsible for auditing the BBC. Dougall discovered that accounting was not for him, so he joined the BBC's Accounts Departments after a friend recommended it to him while he was conducting an audit.

== Career ==
On his 21st birthday in 1934, his bilingualism landed him a position as a radio announcer for the BBC Empire Service (the forerunner of the BBC World Service), becoming the youngest BBC staff announcer. Dougall also worked for the BBC European Service, where he conducted a number of interviews that were broadcast across Europe. He worked six days on and three days off before transitioning to outside broadcasts with a focus on the London scene.

By 1939, Dougall had advanced to the position of associate editor, and he announced the United Kingdom's declaration of war on Germany when Germany invaded Poland that September. He had broadcast a message as a "anonymous" Englishman (although speaking in German, which was translated by a member of the German Service), pleading with Germany to withdraw its forces and avert the impending war. Dougall was "indefinitely reserved" for duty as a radio war correspondent and commentator for outside events by the BBC during the early years of the Second World War. As he informed the world and the British Empire about the events of the war, he reported on The Blitz in London and Plymouth, decamped with the BBC Overseas Service at Abbey Manor in Evesham, reported for Radio Newsreel and interviewed Commonwealth leaders.

In 1942, Dougall resigned from the BBC following the corporation's recruitment of Irish playwright Denis Johnston as its Middle East air correspondent. He signed up to train with the Royal Naval Volunteer Service that same year. Dougall took a short course in Russian in Harwich, where he completed his basic training, after learning that volunteers were needed for special duties at a Northern Russia base. He sailed with convoys carrying supplies from Britain and the United States between Murmansk, at the end of the Russian portion of the Arctic convoy route, and the United Kingdom.

Following demobilisation, Dougall returned to the BBC as an announcer and newsreader for the BBC Home Service. In 1947, he was appointed programme manager of the BBC's Far Eastern Service by the Foreign Office, a position which required him to move to Singapore. He was responsible for relaying Russian broadcasts to London until the Far Eastern Service became redundant soon after and went on to become a presenter of the BBC Light Programme shows Serenade for Sleep, Music for Midnight and Family Favourites. He also presented the 10 p.m. news bulletin from February 1951.

Dougall began working as a television newsreader in 1954, and is thought to have been the only person from the BBC's early radio service who had an enduring career in television. He and other BBC newsreaders such as Kenneth Kendall and Richard Baker were not visible until the September 1955 debut of ITN led chief news editor Tahu Hole to agree to broadcast their faces but not their names on-screen. As part of an effort to make television less trivial, news headline evening bulletins were broadcast every hour from 6 to 11 p.m., and Dougall was appointed to be a member of the news reading team on 1 October 1957. It was then that he and other newsreaders could be named.

According to Leonard Miall of The Independent and his obituarist in The Times, Dougall became popular with the television audience with his straightforwardness. He announced the fall of Nikita Khrushchev and the results of the 1964 United Kingdom general election. Dougall was selected to present News Review for the Hard of Hearing when BBC2 was launched in 1964, and worked as a news reading training adviser for radio and television personnel of the Voice of Kenya in late 1968. He was the first person to present the long-running BBC Nine O'Clock News in 1970, continuing in this role until his retirement from the newsroom on 31 December 1973. Dougall's autobiography, In and Out of the Box, was published in October 1973 and has been reprinted six times. He was the subject of This is Your Life on 2 January 1974.

== Post-retirement ==
From 1970 to 1975, he was president of the Royal Society for the Protection of Birds (RSPB), and became its honorary vice-president in 1979, having been a member of the organisation since 1949. The RSPB's membership increased from 50,000 to 250,000 during Dougall's presidency, and took responsibility for land-management at Minsmere and exporting the RSPB's expertise abroad to reserves such as Spain's Coto de Donana and Malta's Ghadira Pool. He was the narrator of two of RSPB's wildlife films and raised money for the Royal National Institute for Deaf People through television appeals. In 1975, he appeared as a guest on The Morecambe & Wise Christmas Show, where he danced. Dougall also appeared on television programmes and films such as The Generation Game, Russell Harty Show, Celebrity Squares, Nationwide, Going for a Song, Yes Minister, Danger Tomorrow and The End of Arthur's Marriage. He appeared in an advertising campaign for the jewellers Prestons of Bolton in the 1980s.

Dougall was a member of the Royal Society of Literature between 1975 and 1983 as well as the Garrick Club. He also presented seven series of Channel 4's over-60s programme Years Ahead over four years and two series of the ITV programme Stars on Sunday in the mid-1970s. In mid-1995, Dougall was removed as president of the Association of Retired Persons Over 50, a role he had held since the anti-ageist association was founded seven years earlier. He was replaced by newsreader Martyn Lewis. Dougall was a contributor to newspapers and magazines such as The Sunday Telegraph Magazine, the Daily Mail, The Spectator and High Life. He wrote the books Now for the Good News (1976), A Celebration of Birds (1978), The Ladybird Book Of British Birds, Basil Ede's Birds (1980) and Birdwatch Round Britain (1982).

== Personal life ==
Dougall married BBC studio manager Nan Bryam (née Lockhart) on 7 June 1947. The couple had a son and he was stepfather to her daughter from a previous marriage. Dougall's granddaughter Rose and grandson Tom are musicians. He was appointed Member of the Most Excellent Order of the British Empire (MBE) in the 1965 Birthday Honours. Dougall died in his sleep in Southwold, Suffolk on 18 December 1999.

== Legacy ==
A bromide print portrait of Dougall taken by Anthony Buckley in 1969 was bequeathed to the National Portrait Gallery, London and put on public display in 2002.
