= Television Newsreel =

British TV news programme (1948–1954)

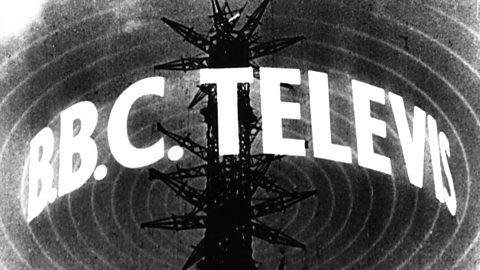
Television Newsreel logo

Television Newsreel is a British television programme, the first regular news programme to be made in the UK. Produced by the BBC and screened on the BBC Television Service from 1948 to 1954 at 7.30 pm, it adapted the traditional cinema newsreel form for the television audience, covering news and current affairs stories as well as quirkier 'human interest' items, sports and cultural events.

The programme's opening title sequence, featuring a graphic of the transmission mast at Alexandra Palace with the title revolving around it, became a well-known image of the time. The theme tune was "Girls in Grey" by Charles Williams and played by the Queen's Hall Light Orchestra. It was published by Chappell on one of its mood music records – it was not specifically written for the newsreel but composed during World War Two for the Women's Junior Air Corps.

== Overview ==
Previously, the BBC had screened cinema newsreels from British Movietone News, as well as sound-only news bulletins from BBC Radio. Following the resumption of the television service in 1946, after its World War II hiatus, a BBC Film Unit was set up to produce items on film. This contrasted with the vast majority of the BBC's output of the time, which was transmitted live via the electronic cameras of the Alexandra Palace studios.

The first Television Newsreel was shown on Monday 5 January 1948. Each edition was fifteen minutes long. It consisted of a number of different items, tending to be fewer and longer in length than in cinema newsreels, most of which ran for only ten minutes in total. The items would have different presenters, and would be linked by a narrated voiceover. The producer was Harold Cox, and D. A. Smith was the editor. The chief cameraman was Alan Lawson, and J. K. Byer was head of sound recordists. Editions would initially be broadcast on Monday, Wednesday and Saturday evenings. From April 1950 a special Children's Newsreel edition would be shown on Saturday afternoons, for the benefit of the younger audience.

Items from the United States were often used, produced by the NBC network within that country. The BBC had a film exchange deal with the American broadcaster, where they would swap film reports they had produced. From 1951, a weekly Newsreel Review of the Week was produced to open programming on Sunday evenings, compiling highlights from the previous week's newsreel features. These weekly editions would be presented by Edward Halliday, who sometimes appeared on-screen to link the various items.

Due to the pre-prepared nature of the Newsreel, topicality and coverage of breaking news stories was impossible. Newsreel was not a true news programme, as the term is understood in the 21st century. The series was regarded more as entertainment, while more serious news bulletins were produced by BBC Radio. These radio bulletins were sometimes broadcast on television, in sound only.

The final edition of the series was broadcast on Sunday 4 July 1954. The following Monday, 5 July 1954, the first BBC News programme was broadcast. The new programme was presented live in the studio by a newsreader. This newsreader was initially unseen and unnamed, because it was felt that identifying the news with one personality would detract from its seriousness. The newsreader linked the reports in the manner currently familiar for news broadcasting. The new programme was initially titled News and Newsreel. After a short while the Newsreel portion was dropped, severing the last link with the Television Newsreel strand.

Children's Newsreel, unlike the later Newsround, made no pretence at being a serious news report. This version begun in April 1950 and continued until September 1961. It outlived its adult parent series by seven years.

== Archive status ==
The programmes were pre-shot on film, as opposed to being shown live. This policy was unlike most of the BBC's output from the late 1940s. Examples of Television Newsreel do survive in the archives. They are some of the oldest extant pieces of BBC-produced television programming. But complete editions with the original linking narration are rare. The individual reports were designed to be re-used in shows such as Newsreel Review of the Week and the end-of-year review Scrapbook. Consequently, reports were archived separately, rather than as complete editions of the programme.

Many of the reports survive due to the negatives having been donated to the National Film Archive at the British Film Institute in the early 1950s. They were the first ever television material to be acquired by the archive, which currently has an extensive collection of broadcast programmes. The BBC donated these on condition that they could have access to them whenever they desired. They subsequently made copies of the donated films for their own archives.

== See also ==
- BBC News
