= Kenneth Kendall =

British broadcaster (1924–2012)

- Kenneth Kendall in the BBC Newsroom
- Born: 7 August 1924; Mysore, British India
- Died: 14 December 2012 (aged 88); Newport, Isle of Wight, England
- Occupations: Journalist, television presenter
- Years active: 1948–2012
- Notable credit(s): BBC News; Treasure Hunt
- Partner: Mark Fear
- Military career
- Allegiance: United Kingdom
- Branch: British Army
- Service years: 1942–1946
- Rank: Captain
- Unit: Coldstream Guards

Kenneth Kendall (7 August 1924 – 14 December 2012) was a British broadcaster. He worked for many years as a newsreader for the BBC, where he was a contemporary of fellow newsreaders Richard Baker and Robert Dougall. He is also remembered as the host of the Channel 4 game show Treasure Hunt, which ran between 1982 and 1989, as well as the host of The World Tonight in the 1968 science fiction film 2001: A Space Odyssey.

== Early life ==
Kendall was born in Mysore, Southern India, where his father, Frederic William Kendall (d. 30 May 1945), worked as a mining engineer at a gold mine. His mother was from Pool, Cornwall. Kendall moved to England when he was 10, and was brought up in Cornwall. He was educated at Felsted School in Essex, England from 1935 to 1942. Kendall was evacuated to Goodrich, Herefordshire during the Second World War. He read Modern Languages at Corpus Christi College, Oxford, for one year in 1942 before being called up to the British Army.

== Military service ==
Kendall joined the Coldstream Guards where he was commissioned as a lieutenant. He arrived in Normandy ten days after D-Day but was wounded about a month later. Kendall joined the Training Battalion at Pirbright Camp as a night patrol instructor. In 1945, he was among 100,000 British military personnel sent to Palestine. In 1946, he was demobilised from the Guards as a captain.

== Broadcasting career ==
After leaving the army, Kendall returned to Oxford to complete his Modern Language degree. He hoped to join the Foreign Office or working for a bank overseas but instead worked as a school teacher at a preparatory school in Sussex for a term. After a friend of his told him of his clear voice, he advised him to take up work as a radio announcer at the BBC. Kendall joined the BBC in 1948 as a radio newsreader and sound announcer at the Home Service. Kendall was taken in as holiday relief for the summer after answering an BBC advertisement in The Daily Telegraph but was offered a contract in the autumn. In 1954, he transferred to television news at Alexandra Palace. Although he was not the first newsreader on BBC Television, Kendall was the first to appear in front of a camera reading the news in 1955. As he was employed on a freelance basis by the BBC, he also worked as an actor for a repertory company based in Crewe, and briefly at the menswear retailer Austin Reed in Regent Street, where he met actor John Inman and offered him a job in the Crewe theatre company. As an member of the North Kensington Conservative Association, Kendall was given permission by the BBC to stand for election to North Kensington Council as a Conservative councillor in 1959, serving on the Pembridge Ward committee.

Kendall became known for his elegant dress sense and was voted best-dressed newsreader by Style International and No.1 newscaster by Daily Mirror readers in 1979. He read his last news bulletin in March 1961 before he was moved to the BBC's programming planning department at his own request. Kendall resigned his staff job on 17 July 1961 and became a freelance broadcaster. He was the compere of the quiz show Pit Your Wits from 1961 to 1963, and he co-presented the ATV fortnightly current affairs and magazine programme The Time—the Place and the Camera with Nan Winton. From 1961 to 1969, he was a freelance newsreader, working occasionally for ITN and presenting Southern Television's Day By Day. He also made cameo appearances as himself in television dramas; he featured in the 1966 Adam Adamant episode "The Doomsday Plan", in which he is kidnapped and impersonated, and he also appeared in the 1966 Doctor Who serial The War Machines. Kendall had a cameo appearance as a newsreader in 2001: A Space Odyssey.

He rejoined BBC News in 1969, and finally retired from newsreading on 23 December 1981; Kendall was unable to read his final news bulletin because he slipped on ice at a park in Ealing and broke his arm. Kendall's retirement allowed him to work on the popular Channel 4 programme Treasure Hunt throughout its first run (1982–1989), which featured Anneka Rice as a "skyrunner". He also presented the television programme Songs of Praise, and the daytime nostalgia programme Whatever Happened to..?. Kendall advocated linguistic coherence as a member of the Queen's English Society.

== Later life ==
Soon after retirement from news reading, Kendall lent his voice to the BBC Micro as part of Acorn Computers' hardware speech synthesis system. In June 1995, he opened a restaurant called "Kendall's Restaurant" in Cowes, Isle of Wight, but sold it a year later after it closed the previous December. Kendall read a news bulletin for the first anniversary of the L!VE TV channel in June 1996.

In 2010 he took part in BBC's series The Young Ones in which six well-known people in their 70s and 80s attempt to overcome some of the problems of ageing by harking back to the 1970s.

== Personal life ==
Kendall lived in Cowes on the Isle of Wight with his partner Mark Fear, with whom he had been since 1989. Fear was the owner of a marine art gallery and a beekeeper. The couple entered into a civil partnership in 2006.

== Death ==
Kendall died at hospital in Newport, Isle of Wight on 14 December 2012, following a stroke a few weeks previously. His funeral took place at Holy Trinity Church, Cowes on 21 December. On 29 April 2013, his partner Mark Fear was found hanged aged 55. An inquest concluded that he had died by suicide because he was "overcome by grief".

== Filmography ==
- The Reckless Moment (1949) – Man (uncredited)
- The Day the Earth Stood Still (1951) – TV Newscaster (uncredited)
- Scotland Yard Evidence in Concrete (1961) – TV news reader on Decca television screen
- The Brain (1962) – TV Newscaster (uncredited)
- Doctor Who: The War Machines (1966) – Himself (Credited, TV cameo)
- They Came from Beyond Space (1967) – Commentator
- The Exorcism – from the Dead of Night BBC TV series. (1972) (Credited)
- 2001: A Space Odyssey (1968) – BBC-12 Announcer (uncredited)

== See also ==
- List of former BBC newsreaders and journalists
