= Richard Baker (broadcaster) =

English broadcaster

Richard Baker OBE RD
- Presenting BBC News in 1982
- Born: Richard Douglas James Baker; 15 June 1925; Willesden, Middlesex, England
- Died: 17 November 2018 (aged 93); Oxford, England
- Occupation: Broadcaster (BBC News)
- Years active: 1954–2007
- Spouse: Margaret Martin (m. 1961)
- Children: 2
- Parent(s): Albert Baker; Jane Isobel Baker (née Baxter)

Richard Douglas James Baker OBE RD (15 June 1925 – 17 November 2018) was an English broadcaster, best known as a newsreader for BBC News from 1954 to 1982, and as a radio presenter of classical music. He was a contemporary of Kenneth Kendall and Robert Dougall and was the first reader of the BBC Television News (in voiceover) in 1954.

== Early life ==
The eldest son of a plasterer, Baker was born in Willesden, north London, and educated at Kilburn Grammar School and at Peterhouse, Cambridge.

Baker's undergraduate years were interrupted by war service in the Royal Naval Volunteer Reserve during World War II. He was on a minesweeper that protected the Allied Arctic supply convoys to the USSR. He was awarded the Royal Naval Reserve decoration. In May 2015 he was awarded the Ushakov Medal for his service in the Arctic convoys of World War II.

== Broadcasting career ==
After graduating from Cambridge University, Baker worked as an actor and as a teacher. An approach to the BBC saw him gain his first broadcasting role, presenting classical music on the BBC Third Programme.

He introduced the first BBC television news broadcast on 5 July 1954, although John Snagge read the actual bulletin. He presented news bulletins on the BBC until he stepped down on 31 December 1982. A competent pianist, he also became closely associated with classical music broadcasting, and presented many music programmes on both television and radio, including, for many years, the annual live broadcast from the Last Night of the Proms. He was a regular panellist on the classical music quiz show Face the Music. From 1979–1980 he was a columnist for Now! Magazine. On radio he presented Baker's Dozen, Start the Week on Radio 4 from April 1970 until 1987, Mozart, These You Have Loved (1972–77), and Melodies for You for BBC Radio 2 (1986–1995, 1999–2003). He also presented the long-running Your Hundred Best Tunes for BBC Radio 2 on Sunday nights, taking over from Alan Keith, who died in 2003, and retiring in January 2007 when the programme was dropped by the BBC. In 1995, he made his first foray into independent radio with a move to Classic FM, where he presented the Classic Countdown and Evening Concert programmes.

Baker narrated Mary, Mungo and Midge (1969), a children's cartoon produced for the BBC, and Teddy Edward (1973), another children's series, as well as Prokofiev's composition for children Peter and the Wolf. He made cameo appearances in three episodes (30, 33 and 39) of Monty Python's Flying Circus and in the 1977 Morecambe and Wise Christmas Show. In the former, he is performing his newsreading duties before pausing and speaking the non sequitur "Lemon curry?"

== Personal life ==
Baker married Margaret Martin, at St Mary The Boltons in Brompton, London, on 2 June 1961, while both were in their mid-30s. They had known each other from infancy as their mothers were friends. The couple had two sons; Andrew, a sports columnist at The Daily Telegraph and James, a television executive at Red Arrow Studios.

Baker wrote a biography of Vice-Admiral Sir Gilbert Stephenson, under whom he had served. The Terror of Tobermory was published by W. H. Allen in 1972.

At the time of his 90th birthday Baker was living with his wife at a retirement village in Oxfordshire. He died on 17 November 2018, at the John Radcliffe Hospital in Oxford, aged 93. Following his death, fellow BBC broadcast journalist John Simpson tweeted: "Richard Baker, who has just died, was one of the finest newsreaders of modern times: highly intelligent, thoughtful, gentle, yet tough in defence of his principles."
