= Re:State =

British think tank

- Formation: 2001; 25 years ago
- Type: Think tank
- Legal status: Company limited by guarantee and charity
- Headquarters: London, United Kingdom
- Director: Charlotte Pickles
- Website

The Re:State Trust, formerly Reform Research Trust, is a think tank which publishes its own research and also publishes papers from external authors. It was founded by Nick Herbert (later a Conservative MP) and Andrew Haldenby.

The trust is a private limited company with charitable status. The name "The Reform Research Trust" was first registered with Companies House on 4 March 2004 and as a charity on 13 May 2004.

The trust is funded by a combination of corporate sponsorship (mainly of events), individual donations, and some competitively-allocated grants. Re:State rigidly retains editorial control over all of its written output.

The think tank publishes reports on a variety of issues, using both qualitative and quantitative methods, including data analysis, comparative analysis, and elite interviews, to inform its policy proposals. It uses an external peer-review process on most of its research outputs.

Re:State has published reports on devolution, Whitehall reform, health and education reform, Britain's regional economic performance, the economic position of young people, and on the tax and welfare system.

It also hosts an active events programme, with a mix of private roundtables and public panel discussions, often featuring significant politicians or senior officials as speakers.

== People ==
Previous deputy directors include Liz Truss, who subsequently became Prime Minister, and Nick Seddon, who was appointed as a Senior Policy Advisor for Health and Social Care to Prime Minister David Cameron.

=== Advisory board ===
- Baroness Nicky Morgan, former Secretary of State
- Björn Savén, chairman, IK Investment Partners Ltd.
- Dame Clare Moriarty, Former Permanent Secretary, Department for Exiting the European Union
- Dame Meg Hillier, Member of Parliament for Hackney South and Shoreditch
- Deborah Cadman, Chief Executive, West Midlands Combined Authority
- Robert Nisbet, Former Senior Political Correspondent, Sky News
- Katie Perrior, Former Director of Communications, No. 10 Downing St.
- Caroline Flint, former Labour MP and Minister
- Sir Peter Gershon, former senior civil servant

=== Trustees ===
- James Palmer, Chair
- Catherine Davies, Managing Partner, Monticle
- Dr Lara Stoimenova, Managing Partner, Sigma Economics
- Jeremy Sillem, Managing Partner and co-founder of Spencer House Partners
- Gavin Boyle
- John St John

Speakers at the trusts events have included:

- Andy Burnham and Sadiq Khan (Labour);
- Theresa May and Jeremy Hunt (Conservative);
- Danny Alexander and Norman Lamb (Liberal Democrat).

== Name of trust ==
The Trust was originally named "The Reform Research Trust" however it sometimes referred to itself simply as "Reform".

The Trust adopted the name Re:State in May 2025, in response to growing confusion caused by the emergence of the Reform UK political party.

In November 2020 the trust voiced its opposition to the electoral committee when the Brexit Party intended to change its name to Reform UK. The charity feared that its non-partisan status would be brought into disrepute by the name change, and requested for the party to come up with an alternative. In January 2021, the Electoral Commission approved of the Brexit Party's name change to Reform UK.

== Funding ==
In November 2022 Re:State was given a 'B' grade for funding transparency by Who Funds You?, meaning that they named at least 85% of donors that provided more than £5,000 of funding.
