= Federation of Conservative Students =

Former British Conservative Party's student wing

The Federation of Conservative Students (FCS) was the student organisation of the British Conservative Party from the late 1940s to 1986. It was created to act as a bridge between the student movement and the Conservative Party. It produced several magazines, and had regular Assembly meetings in which motions would be voted on. It had supported some controversial actions, such as the legalisation of various drugs, and the privatisation of the Trident nuclear missiles. There was continual tension between central party, which funded the organisation, and the Federation – which often used the funds on exploring unconventional policies.

The Federation had considerable influence on national politics (considered by some to be "the fast track to the next Conservative Party"), as committee members were consulted by MP's, and Ted Heath specifically had speeches written by the Federation's chairmen.

In its final years it became known colloquially as "Maggie's Militant Tendency", in reference to then Prime Minister Margaret Thatcher and to Militant, an entryist group active in the Labour Party at the time. The FCS was then broken up by the Chairman of the Conservative Party, Norman Tebbit, after one of its members had accused previous former Prime Minister Harold Macmillan of war crimes in extraditing Cossacks to the Soviet Union. The FCS was replaced by the Conservative Collegiate Forum.

== History ==
The organisation was originally founded as the Federation of University Conservative and Unionists Associations (FUCUA) in January 1930 with Col. John Buchan MP (later Lord Tweedsmuir and Governor General of Canada) as its first President.

FUCUA was renamed the Federation of Conservative Students in 1967. From the 1980s onward it became a more controversial group.

=== Paradigm shift ===
The policies of Margaret Thatcher had a polarising effect on British politics and the student left moved towards radicalism in their response to them. Many students' unions would pass motions instituting a policy of "No Platform for Racists or Fascists". Starting in the early 1980s, the organisation adopted a more confrontational approach toward the left-leaning National Union of Students. Leaders, most notably from Scotland, started advocating "voluntary students' unions". They organised campaigns aimed at disaffiliating individual students' unions from the NUS to weaken the so-called block vote, and deprive it of taxpayers' money which the NUS used for various causes. Posters and other publicity material became much more provocative and hard-hitting.

=== Factionalism ===
In the early years FCS was moderate in its outlook and elected a number of National Chairmen reflecting a mainstream outlook. These included Mark Carlisle MP, Andrew Neil and Antony Buck MP.

However the 1970s saw increasing factionalism mirroring the internal conflicts between Monday Club and the Heathite leadership. In its last years, the FCS, perhaps reflecting the debate within the Conservative party of the 1980s and the generally fractious nature of student politics, was notably prone to factionalism. The three main factions were:

- An authoritarian faction
- A libertarian, or "sound", faction
- A moderate faction, known to the other factions as "wet"

==== Authoritarians ====
The authoritarian faction centred on the student Monday Club, and was not particularly well known compared to the much larger Libertarian faction. It was linked with traditional British nationalism, an isolationist posture in relation to foreign affairs, opposition (as espoused by Enoch Powell) to immigration, scepticism about liberal economics, and staunch support for the Union.

==== Libertarians ====
The Libertarian faction (the "Libs") was closely linked to the Libertarian Alliance run by Chris Tame, and the Adam Smith Institute, run by Madsen Pirie.

The Libertarian faction was the largest faction in the FCS in its last few years. Its overall dominance is illustrated by the passage of a libertarian motion in favour of free migration at the Leicester conference, shortly before the demise of the FCS, which was opposed by both the wet and the authoritarian factions.

Under Glendening, elected Chairman in 1984, the FCS became more controversial than ever as it embraced social liberalism in addition to the already established endorsement of economic libertarianism; issues such as supporting the legalisation of drugs were no longer taboo.

Many former leaders of the libertarian faction, such as Mark MacGregor, went on to hold senior office in the Conservative Party. Other notable members of "the Libs" included Brian Monteith, Robbie Gibb, and Douglas "Dougie" Smith. John Bercow and Andrew Rosindell were once also members, although they had also been part of the authoritarian faction.

==== Moderates ====
The Moderate faction had controlled the FCS until 1980. Some of them were members of the Tory Reform Group (TRG). Eight prominent members of the moderate faction including several former chairmen joined the SDP in 1981.

Despite a relatively high number of supporters and control of some large student bodies, they only once gained influence in the national federation after 1980, through a controversial last minute alliance with the authoritarian faction in 1983.

The moderate faction was usually referred to by its opponents as the "Wets" in an allusion to the contemporary nickname for the anti-Thatcherite wing of the parliamentary party, although after 1980 this description was often vehemently rejected by members of the moderate faction in FCS themselves in favour of titles such as the "Party Faction" and "Conservative Student Unionists." This was partly because they saw themselves as seeking to represent the mainstream of the party and not just the left, and partly because this faction did contain a significant proportion of prominent members such as Paul Goodman and Mark Francois who later became MPs perceived to be to the right of the party leadership.

In many universities the TRG organised itself as a complementary political society to the main Conservative group. This is a policy that the TRG has maintained since, although the last of these societies, the Oxford TRG Society, merged with Oxford's Conservative Association in 2007.

== Controversy ==
=== Political stance ===
In the 1980s, the FCS was noted for being more radical than the main party, more Thatcherite than Thatcher – ministers invited to speak at conferences were routinely chastised for not going far enough.

In addition to supporting privatisation, controversial positions embraced included the support for American intervention in Grenada, RENAMO, the UNITA rebels in Angola, and the Contras in Nicaragua. The Federation made badges with the words "Nicaragua Must be Free". Some Labour students began wearing them without realising their origin and intended meaning.

=== Alleged riot at Loughborough University ===
There was some damage during the 1985 FCS conference at Loughborough University, leading to press reports of a "riot". The officers elected at that conference were mainly of the libertarian faction who espouse many of the controversial libertarian ideals which have embarrassed the party leadership. Although it was clear that some damage was done, the so-called riot was vastly exaggerated, the final bill for repairs that the University presented came to under £20, and there would not be enough evidence to close the FCS as the then Party Chairman John Selwyn Gummer wanted. Nevertheless, reports of "riots" in the media, including the Daily Star and the Daily Mirror, motivated Gummer immediately to suspend the FCS's £30,000 annual grant.

The Daily Telegraph wrote that the "students cleared up the mess after the offending party, and journalists who saw the room the morning after reported a damaged door handle, a missing light bulb and beer stains on the carpet in a corridor to be the only visible signs of damage." Inspector Patricia Perry of Loughborough Police Station said "there was no physical damage". In a letter to The Times, Professor Peter Havard-Williams of Loughborough University stated "The damage itself was not more than that done by many other conferences and was not excessive." Mark MacGregor suggested that Gummer's actions were politically motivated: "Unfortunately, many of our supporters will see this as a move against the leaders they have elected. Our supporters are from working-class backgrounds, and the party establishment seems to feel that we don't quite fit in."

In The Observer, Toby Young wrote: "As nights of mob terror go, last Monday's party at the Federation of Conservative Students' Conference was pretty tame". Both Young and Sir Alfred Sherman believed that Gummer's actions were motivated by his opposition to the libertarian ideology of some of the FCS' members which closely resembled some of Mrs Thatcher's personal beliefs. Sherman wrote that Gummer's actions were "directed against the Prime Minister". Tim Hames and Nick Robinson later admitted that the bill presented for damage was less than £20, and that the media reports were as a result of an "astute spinning operation" by Wet delegates from the University of Oxford, who "directed journalists to students who offered harrowing accounts of the boorish behaviour of libertarian activists."

== Demise ==
The FCS was disbanded by Norman Tebbit, who succeeded Gummer as the party chairman. This was for publishing an article, penned by Harry Phibbs, following Nikolai Tolstoy's accusation that former Conservative Prime Minister Harold Macmillan was complicit in war crimes for his involvement in the forced repatriation of Cossack prisoners of war to Soviet Russia in the aftermath of World War II.

== Past chairmen ==
- John Buchan (1930)
- Michael Hooker (194?)
- Antony Buck (194?)
- Dennis Walters (1950)
- Mark Carlisle (1953)
- John MacGregor (1959)
- Kenneth Clarke (1965)
- Ian Taylor (1968)
- Stephen Krepple (1969)
- Roger Mountford (1970)
- Andrew Neil (1971)
- Anthony Speaight (1972)
- David Davis (1973)
- Michael Forsyth (1976)
- David Wilks (1977)
- Eddie Longworth (1978)
- Stuart Bayliss (1979)
- Peter Young (1980)
- Tim Linacre (1981)
- Brian Monteith (1982)
- Paul Goodman (1983)
- Marc-Henri Glendening (1984)
- Mark MacGregor (1985)
- John Bercow (1986)
