= Jim Waterson =

British journalist (born 1989)

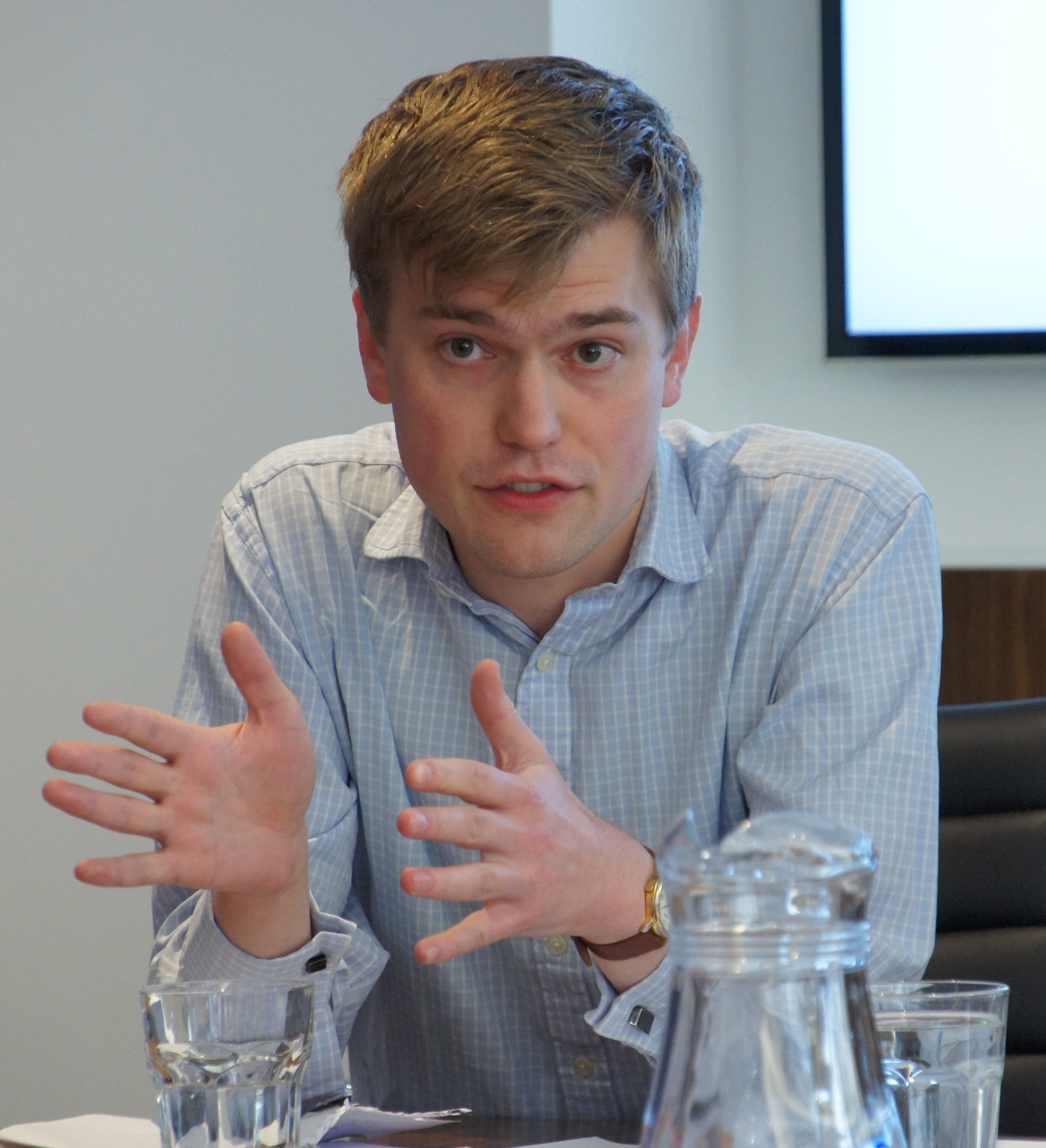
- Waterson in 2011
- Born: James Waterson; March 1989 (age 36–37); York, England
- Partner: Jess Brammar (2017–present)
- Children: 2

James Waterson (born March 1989) is an English journalist who was the media editor of The Guardian. Previously, he was political editor of BuzzFeed UK, and prior to that worked for City AM.

== Early life ==
Waterson was born in York. He attended Oundle School, leaving in 2007. He graduated from Jesus College, Oxford, in 2011, with a degree in history. He represented the college on the 2009–10 series of University Challenge.

== Career ==
Waterson interned at Guido Fawkes, The Independent, and The Observer before landing his first job covering politics and business on City A.M. While at City A.M., he fried an egg on a street using reflected heat from the 20 Fenchurch Street skyscraper.

He was BuzzFeed News' UK political editor from 2013, before joining The Guardian in 2018. In 2024 he set up London Centric, a newsletter publishing "exclusive, ambitious and interesting news stories about the capital that aren't being reported by other outlets".

He has presented Week in Westminster on BBC Radio 4, and appeared on Moral Maze in February 2017.

== Personal life ==
Waterson has been in a relationship with journalist Jess Brammar since 2017. Brammar has been the editor of BBC News and BBC World News since 2021. The couple have a son, born in 2020.
