= Betsygate =

Political scandal in the United Kingdom

Betsygate was a political scandal in the United Kingdom concerning the level of pay received by Elisabeth ("Betsy") Duncan Smith, the wife and diary secretary of the then Leader of the Conservative Party, Iain Duncan Smith. A report from a Parliamentary watchdog cleared Iain Duncan Smith of any wrongdoing.

== Allegation ==
In May 2002, Michael Crick, an investigative journalist on the BBC Newsnight programme, initiated an investigation into the pay received by Mrs. Duncan Smith, and alleged that the pay was not commensurate with the duties she performed during the period from September 2001 to December 2002.

== Background ==
Rikki Radford, Iain Duncan Smith's constituency agent since 2002, allegedly denied that Mrs. Duncan Smith had fulfilled a professional role for her husband since he became party leader, saying: "I know for sure she doesn't ... The bottom line is that she's his wife and she gets on with looking after the kids."

Furthermore, only one of 18 groups in Duncan Smith's constituency visited by him in 2002 allegedly recalled any contact with Mrs. Duncan Smith. A party official in the constituency and six Conservative MPs also told the journalists that they saw no evidence of Mrs. Duncan Smith working for her husband during the 15-month period in question.

Crick's report was expected to go out on the Thursday before the Conservative Party conference but it was vetoed at the last minute by BBC executives, who were nervous about running the story for fear that the information had come from people with an interest in the downfall of Duncan Smith. Crick was forced to first present his case to the accused for his comments, and then laid out the details of his investigation to the House of Commons Committee on Standards and Privileges, at the request of lawyers of Duncan Smith.

== Smear allegations ==
An email written in January 2003 by Vanessa Gearson, who was working in Duncan Smith's office (and was later the Conservative candidate for Cheltenham at the 2005 general election), expressed concern that the allowance might become the subject of a journalistic (newspaper or television) exposé. A copy of the email found its way to Crick's investigation. People close to Duncan Smith began attributing the leaking of the document to the party's Chief Executive Mark MacGregor, as well as his friend Robbie Gibb, a Newsnight producer.

== Investigations ==
A report from a Parliamentary watchdog cleared Duncan Smith of any wrongdoing: The Commissioner "found no evidence that Duncan Smith made improper claims under the Additional Costs Allowance in respect of his home". However, he found that a significant proportion of Mrs Duncan Smith's work, and that paid to Miss Annabelle Eyre and Mrs Christine Watson in their roles of Private Secretary to the Leader of the Opposition, "would more appropriately have been funded out of Short Money than out of the Parliamentary Staffing Allowance". Nevertheless, it was accepted that there was an absence of definition of key terms meaning that members had no guidance to scope their two allowances. The Commons Standards Committee found that Duncan Smith's arrangements "were not ideal" but that no rules had been broken.

A January 2006 internal Party investigation exonerated MacGregor. Nevertheless, Duncan Smith laid the blame for his downfall at MacGregor and Gearson, and threatened to resign the party whip if either were ever again able to stand as Conservative candidates.
