= Mark MacGregor =

British politician and entrepreneur

Mark MacGregor (born 25 February 1961) is a British Conservative Party politician and entrepreneur. He fought several parliamentary elections for the party, became chief executive of Conservative Central Office from 2002 to 2003 and then ran Steve Norris' campaign to become Mayor of London in 2004. He has run various businesses, including a communications company, Marketforce Communications Ltd, an events firm and a cloud technology company, Connect Support Services Ltd. He was appointed deputy director of Policy Exchange in early 2013 a year after his eldest child was born.

== Biography ==
MacGregor was born in 1961. He was educated at Emanuel School in London and Heriot-Watt University, Edinburgh, where he graduated with a degree in economics and modern history. In 1985, he was the national chairman of the Federation of Conservative Students (FCS), where he was associated with the libertarian faction.

In October 2002, MacGregor accepted undisclosed libel damages and a public apology at the High Court over allegations in Punch magazine. Mr Justice Eady was told that MacGregor had never been chairman or a member of the Young Monday Club as had been falsely claimed by the magazine. Mr MacGregor also successfully sued the Daily Mail for libel over similar allegations related to his period as Chairman of the FCS.

=== Non-political career ===
Worked for Michael Forsyth Ltd, and then became the founder Director of Marketforce Communications, his own PR agency and conference company. From 2007, he has been chief executive of cloud and IT service company Connect Support Services.

=== Parliamentary contests ===
In 1997, MacGregor contested the ultra-safe Labour seat of West Ham for the Conservatives. Labour's Tony Banks got 24,531 votes (72.9%), MacGregor 5,037 (15.0).

MacGregor contested the South Thanet constituency for the first time in 2001. On that occasion Stephen Ladyman polled 18,002 votes for Labour (45.7%) while MacGregor got 16,210 for the Conservatives (41.1%). He stood once again in the 2005 general election, when he failed by 664 votes to defeat Ladyman, and BBC suggests the 2,079 votes gained by the UK Independence Party candidate, Nigel Farage, is likely to have cost MacGregor the seat.

=== Internal party posts ===
MacGregor was elected Chairman of the Conservative Students in 1985-86 and Chairman of the National Association of Conservative Graduates, 1989–90.

==== Conservative Central Office ====
In 2002, MacGregor was named the new chief executive of the Conservative Central Office appointed by Iain Duncan Smith on becoming Party leader. One of his first actions as chief executive was to push through a £1 million budget cut to stabilise the party's poor finances.

In his role, MacGregor was credited with drafting the speech for the then Chairman of the Conservative Party, Theresa May MP, which described the Tories as "the nasty party". Former front-bencher, John Bercow said MacGregor was "talented" and "extraordinarily imaginative" and had organised a successful 2002 Party conference.

In a dispute over the leadership of Duncan-Smith, Tebbit called for MacGregor's dismissal as the party's chief executive in 2002. Tebbit branded MacGregor as "one of the spotty youths" who were trying to make the Tories more socially inclusive. Tebbit said: "I don't think he was a good chief executive... I think that he was not a good influence in Central Office." MacGregor was replaced by the former MP, Barry Legg.

Central Office was quoted as saying that MacGregor's departure was "long-planned and by mutual consent". He wanted to become a parliamentary candidate and could not do so while chief executive, but he had reportedly clashed with Smith both over policy and organisational issues as well as the vexed issue of Duncan-Smith's wife working for her husband. (See #Betsygate)

Central Office claims were undermined the following day when Michael Portillo MP (a leadership rival to Duncan-Smith), raised fresh doubts about Iain Duncan Smith's leadership of the Conservatives saying he was deeply disappointed by the replacement of Mark MacGregor. Portillo said : "Mark MacGregor and Rick Nye are two of the most talented people that the party has ever employed and their achievements will be badly missed." John Bercow praised MacGregor's loyalty, but also lamented the loss of his talent and creativity, adding "the modernising agenda has been at best, sidelined and at worst, lost".

== Personal political allegiances ==
MacGregor was an active member of the Thatcherite 'Conservative Way Forward' group in the 1990s though he is no longer involved in the organisation. Robbie Gibb, one-time Chief of Staff for Francis Maude and brother of Nick Gibb, was best man at MacGregor's first wedding. The two were near neighbours in Pimlico in the 1990s and have been friends since MacGregor was chairman of the Conservative Students and Gibb a leader of the Conservative Students in the mid-Eighties.

In the 1983 and 1987 General Elections, MacGregor worked for Michael Forsyth who was elected in the marginal seat of Stirling in Scotland. He was Francis Maude's campaign manager in the 1992 General Election. Maude would lose his marginal North Warwickshire seat, despite winning more votes than at the election before.

Staunch supporter of Michael Portillo, MacGregor was thought to be behind the decision to install extra phone lines in a house in Lord North Street in 1995, as a possible campaign HQ for Portillo when it appeared Major was on the point of being ousted by the right.

He also ran the Conservative Mayoral campaign in 2004 to elect Steve Norris as Mayor of London – Norris lost to Ken Livingstone.

In 2006, he supported David Handley in his bid for the leadership of the National Farmers Union.

== Betsygate ==
Allegations which surfaced concerning the payment, out of the Parliamentary purse, of wages to Betsy Duncan Smith led to an investigation into the conduct of IDS by the House of Commons Committee on Standards and Privileges.

In January 2006, the Conservatives launched an inquiry into the "Betsygate affair" and MacGregor's alleged role in it. The Sunday Telegraph revealed that the party had been re-investigating the saga surrounding payments made by the former leader, Iain Duncan Smith, to his wife, Betsy, for secretarial work in 2003. In the private report, MacGregor was cleared of any wrongdoing. MacGregor and Gearson were reinserted on the parliamentary candidates list, despite protests from the traditionalist Cornerstone Group of backbenchers, although he was not later reselected by the Thanet South Conservative Association, losing to Laura Sandys who later became the MP.

== Later career ==
In 2007, MacGregor resumed his business career becoming chief executive of cloud and IT services business, Connect Support Services. In 2011, Connect purchased the assets of Hosted Revolution Ltd and in 2012 acquired Thinhost Ltd, both cloud service providers.

In 2013, he was appointed deputy director of Policy Exchange.
