= Jonathan Munro =

British journalist

Jonathan Munro is BBC News Global Director and Deputy CEO, BBC News and Current Affairs.

== Early life ==
Munro was born in Sheffield in 1966. He was educated at Nottingham University.

== ITV career ==
Munro worked at ITN for 26 years. He joined as an editorial trainee and worked as a correspondent in the UK, Europe (for three years) and elsewhere. In 2004, when Deborah Turness was promoted to the new role of editor of ITV News Network, Munro became her deputy, in the role of ITV News assistant editor, responsible for newsgathering and the planning of special events. He covered the Yugoslav Wars, the Gulf War, the 2008 Summer Olympics and the 2012 Summer Olympics. He worked in the United States, Russia and Africa, and was Political News Editor for two years. He won an RTS Judges’ Award for negotiating the UK's first prime ministerial debates in 2010. In 2012, he was Director of Newsgathering and Deputy Editor of ITV News.

Munro deputised for Turness when she was on maternity leave; and was Acting Editor when Turness left ITN in 2013.

== BBC career ==
In 2013, Munro replaced Fran Unsworth as the BBC's Head of Newsgathering. Unsworth became deputy director of News and Current Affairs.

In 2014, the corporation flew a helicopter over Sir Cliff Richard's house. Munro supported the decision to do so, despite a court ruling that it breached the singer's privacy. Munro said in court that he thought it was acceptable to film police searching the home of someone under investigation.

Munro was involved in the appointment of Martin Bashir to the post of BBC religious affairs correspondent in 2016. Questions about the methods by which Bashir's interview with Princess Diana was secured for the BBC sparked controversy over the appointment. Munro said at the time: "Martin's track record in enterprising journalism is well-known and respected in the industry and amongst our audiences". Munro had informally met Bashir over coffee on 23 June 2016.

Munro was Executive Producer of the BBC's main debate programmes during the 2016 Brexit Referendum and 2017 and 2019 UK elections.

In March 2021, Munro became Senior Controller, News Content and deputy director of News, responsible for the production of the journalism that supports the BBC's news programmes and platforms. In this role, he deputised for the Director of News and Current Affairs on all editorial issues.

In September 2021, after Fran Unsworth, director of News & Current Affairs, announced that she would be standing down from her position, Munro was suggested as her successor. The Daily Telegraph reported at the time that the then director-general of the BBC, Tim Davie, was warned he risked undermining the BBC's impartiality and high editorial standards if he appointed Munro as its head of news. In the event, Munro succeeded Unsworth on an interim basis on 27 January 2022, sitting on the BBC's executive committee. Davie said that Munro would hold the post "until Deborah Turness joins us later this year". Turness had been prevented from taking the post as her employer, ITN, had denied her early release from her notice period. Turness joined, and Munro stood down from, the executive committee on 5 September 2022. Munro was Turness's deputy.

In July 2024, it was announced that Munro would become the new Global Director of BBC News, with responsibility for BBC World Service and BBC Monitoring, whilst retaining his role as Deputy CEO of BBC News. On taking up the post, Munro said:

“As I’ve traveled around the world with the BBC over the last decade or so, everywhere I have been I’ve been told of the enduring value of impartial news, in English and our more than 40 other languages. The need for independent news is growing, not shrinking, and the BBC’s role in pursuing truth and enriching knowledge has never been more important."

In December 2024, Munro told the House of Commons select committee inquiry on the future of the BBC World Service that additional investment was required to avoid decline. He contrasted the current BBC spending of £400 million a year with an estimated £8 billion by Russia and China combined. In January 2025, Munro announced that the BBC World Service would cut 130 jobs as part of a plan to save around £6 million in the next financial year.

== Other interests ==
Munro is a Trustee of BBC Children in Need, and led a flagship project focusing on mental health support for children and young people across the UK. He is also a supporter of BBC Media Action, the BBC's international charity. He is a member of the Board of the Society of Editors.
