= Jess Brammar =

British journalist

- Born: Jessica Mary M. Brammar; 1982 (age 43–44)
- Education: London School of Economics
- Occupation: Journalist
- Employers: BBC; ITN; HuffPost UK
- Partner: Jim Waterson (2017–present)
- Children: 1

Jessica Mary M. Brammar (born 1982) is a British journalist who has been the editor of the BBC's television news channels BBC News and BBC World News since 2021.

== Career ==
Brammar attended St Katherine's School in Abbots Leigh near Bristol. She originally wanted to become a nurse but did not have the required exam grades and spent two years working in data entry at Norwich Union. She later studied History and Russian at the London School of Economics where she worked on the student newspaper.

Brammar spent five years as a researcher on Question Time before joining ITN. She later became deputy editor of Newsnight, where she won Royal Television Society awards for her journalism.

In 2018, Brammar was appointed Head of News at HuffPost UK. She was made executive editor in March 2019, and in February 2020 was appointed editor-in-chief. She stepped down from the post in April 2021, after BuzzFeed made editorial cutbacks to HuffPost UK.

In July 2021, it was reported that Brammar was front-runner to be BBC executive news editor, but that the non-executive BBC director Robbie Gibb had attempted to block her appointment. Gibb, a former communications director to Theresa May's Conservative government, texted the BBC director for news and current affairs, Fran Unsworth, to say that the BBC "cannot make this appointment", threatening that if it went ahead the government's "fragile trust in the BBC will be shattered".

After Brammar deleted hundreds of her tweets, The Telegraph recovered tweets in which she was reported to have been "poking fun at Mr Johnson".

On 15 September 2021, she was appointed Executive Editor of the BBC News Channel.

== Personal life ==
Brammar has been in a relationship with journalist Jim Waterson since 2017. Waterson is a former media editor of The Guardian. They have one child.
