= Ian Oliver =

British police officer (1940–2022)

Ian Oliver QPM

Chief Constable of Central Scotland Police
- In office 1979–1990
- Preceded by: Edward Frizzell
- Succeeded by: William Wilson

Chief Constable of Grampian Police
- In office 1990–1998
- Preceded by: Alistair G. Lynn
- Succeeded by: Andrew G. Brown

Personal details
- Born: Ian Thomas Oliver; 24 January 1940
- Died: 8 July 2022 (aged 82)
- Spouse: Elsie Oliver
- Children: 3, including Craig Oliver
- Profession: Police officer, author, speaker, security consultant

Ian Oliver, QPM (24 January 1940 – 8 July 2022) was a British police officer, author, speaker and consultant for the United Nations. He served as Chief Constable of Scotland's Central and Grampian Police force. Since leaving the police, he has worked as a consultant and speaker on the issues of drugs, terrorism and trafficking. He was a board member of the International Scientific & Medical Advisory Forum on Drug Abuse, was appointed a life member of the International Association of Chiefs of Police and was an elected Member of the Institute of Global Drug Policy. Oliver was the father of Craig Oliver, the Director of Politics and Communications for British prime minister David Cameron.

== Career ==
After training as a company secretary, Oliver served as an officer with the Royal Air Force between 1959 and 1961. After leaving the Air Force he joined London's Metropolitan Police Service as a constable, working his way up to the rank of Superintendent. He moved to Northumbria Police as a Chief Superintendent in 1977, then later became the force's Assistant Chief Constable. In 1979 he was appointed Chief Constable of Central Scotland Police, a job he held for eleven years until moving to the Grampian force. He was Chief Constable of Grampian Police from 1990 to 1998. During his time in Scotland he was twice elected as President of the Association of Chief Police Officers in Scotland, as well as international vice president of the International Association of Chiefs of Police. He was awarded the Queen's Police Medal for Distinguished Police Service.

In 1998 he took early retirement after a tabloid newspaper published details of his private life, and a report by the Grampian Police Board heavily criticised the force's handling of the investigation into the 1997 murder of Scott Simpson, a nine-year-old boy who was murdered by a convicted child sex offender near his Aberdeen home. After leaving the police Oliver worked as a consultant for the United Nations from 1998, a visiting lecturer at the University of Teesside (1999–2003), a drug training consultant to Aberdeen College of Further Education from 2005 and as consultant for Decision Strategies plc from 2003 to 2005. In 2009 he was appointed the head of justice and security in Afghanistan's Helmand Province, where he worked closely with the Afghan National Police in a bid to reform the police and justice system of the area.

== Personal life ==
Oliver was the son of Police Constable Thomas Oliver, who was awarded the George Medal for his bravery in trying to rescue victims of the Barnes Railway Crash on 2 December 1955. His son, Sir Craig Oliver, is a former BBC News executive who was appointed David Cameron's Director of Communications in February 2011, following the resignation of Andy Coulson.

Oliver died in Scotland on 8 July 2022, at the age of 82 (although his obituary states he died 7 July his family report he died just after midnight on 8 July).

== Bibliography and publications ==
- The Metropolitan Police Approach to the Prosecution of Juvenile Offenders: Peel Press (1978)
- Police, Government and Accountability: Macmillan (1987, reprinted 1996)
- Weekly column for the Press and Journal (2001 – 20??)
