= Laura Wyld, Baroness Wyld =

British communications specialist and life peer

The Right Honourable The Baroness Wyld
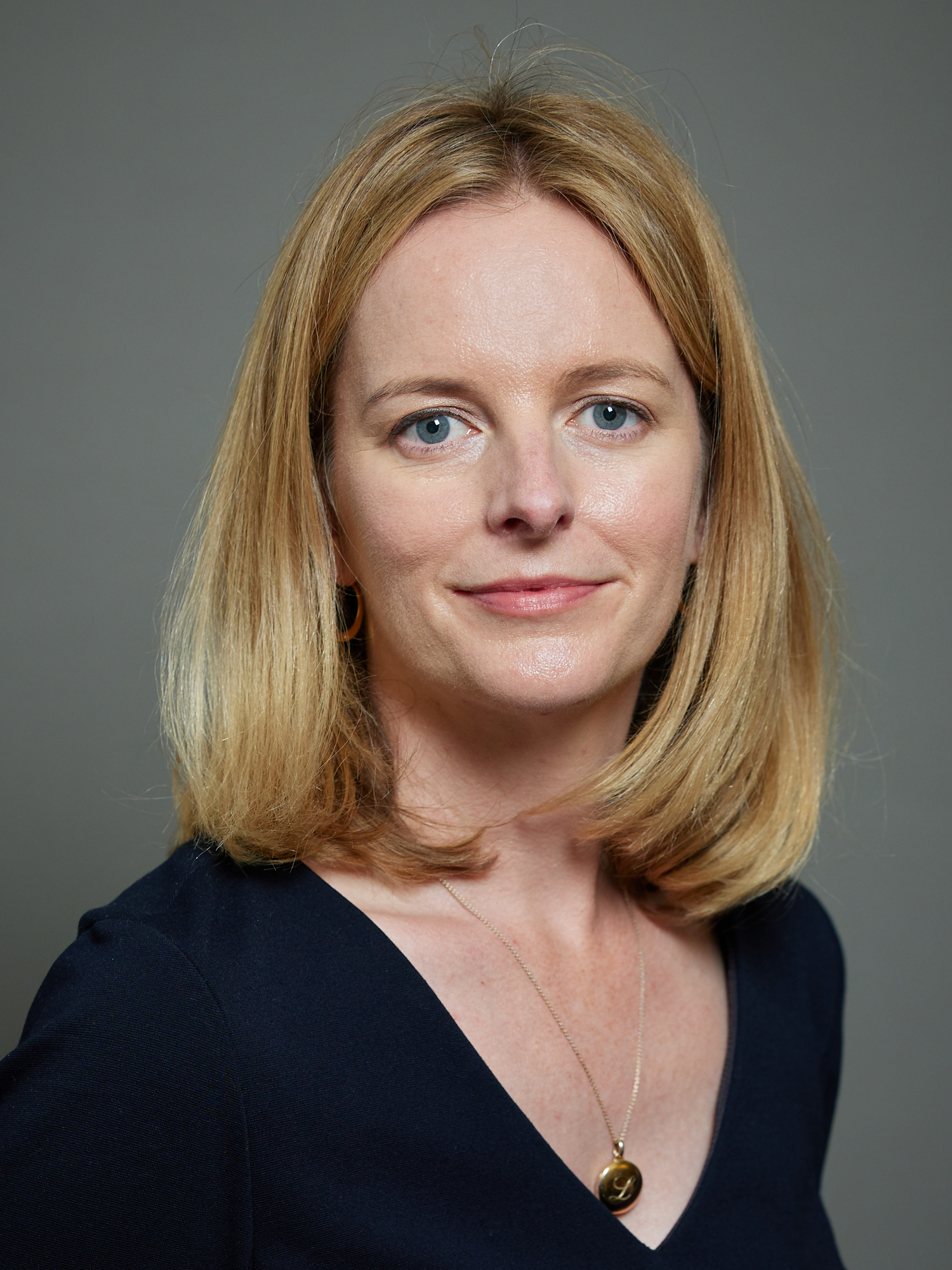
- Official portrait, 2022

Member of the House of Lords
- Lord Temporal
- Life peerage 22 June 2017

Personal details
- Born: 13 January 1978 (age 48)
- Party: Conservative
- Education: Sidney Sussex College, Cambridge

Laura Lee Wyld, Baroness Wyld (born 13 January 1978) is a British communications specialist and life peer. She served as head of the Prime Minister's Appointments Unit from 2013 to 2016, and has been a Conservative member of the House of Lords since 2017.

Wyld was educated in Newcastle upon Tyne and at Sidney Sussex College, Cambridge, where she read history. She was nominated for a life peerage as part of David Cameron's Resignation Honours in 2016, but the creation of her peerage was set to be delayed until the start of the next parliamentary session. She was created Baroness Wyld, of Gosforth in the City of Newcastle upon Tyne, on 22 June 2017.
