= Craig Oliver (British journalist) =

British news editor, producer and media executive (born 1969)

Sir Craig Oliver

Downing Street Director of Communications
- In office 28 February 2011 – 13 July 2016
- Prime Minister: David Cameron
- Preceded by: Andy Coulson
- Succeeded by: Katie Perrior

Personal details
- Born: Craig Stewart Oliver; 15 May 1969 (age 57) Basford, Nottinghamshire, England
- Spouse: Joanna Gosling (1996–2014; divorced)
- Relations: Ian Oliver (father)
- Children: 3
- Education: University of St Andrews; Cardiff School of Journalism, Media and Cultural Studies
- Occupation: Journalist, media executive, spin doctor

Sir Craig Stewart Oliver (born 15 May 1969) is a British former Director of Politics and Communications for British prime minister David Cameron, news editor, producer and media executive.

Previously, he was Controller of English news output for BBC Global News, responsible for commissioning the news content for the corporation's English-language global services, including the BBC World Service, BBC World News and BBC News Online.

== Early life ==
Oliver was born in Basford, Nottinghamshire. His father, Ian, relocated the family to Scotland on his promotion to Chief Constable of Central Scotland Police, then later Chief Constable of Grampian Police; his father later faced several controversies in the latter post.

Craig Oliver attended Stirling High School, where he was a contemporary of the presenter Kirsty Young, then went on to read English literature at the University of St Andrews.

== Career ==
=== Journalism ===
After graduating with a diploma in Broadcast Journalism from the Cardiff School of Journalism, Oliver began his media career in 1992 as a reporter for STV.

One of his first assignments for the station was covering a fire in a block of flats in Glasgow's Easterhouse district. In 1993 he joined ITN as a trainee reporter, after which he became a producer on ITV's News at Ten. With the launch of Channel Five in 1997 he moved from News at Ten to become programme editor of Five News, but returned to ITV in 1999 as senior programme editor for ITV Evening News. He moved to Channel Four News in 2002, but once again returned to ITV News the following year when he was appointed Head of Output. He was later promoted to Head of Network News Programming.

Oliver joined the BBC in 2006, where he became editor of BBC One's Ten O'Clock News, He was also editor of the channel's Six O'Clock News.

In May 2009, Oliver was appointed the new deputy head of the corporation's multimedia newsroom, replacing Mary Hockaday.

Oliver was subsequently appointed Controller of English, BBC Global News in April 2010, with responsibility for multiplatform commissioning of all BBC Global News English output. He took up this role after editing the BBC's 2010 general election coverage. In June 2010, Oliver became a director of BBC World News Limited. At BBC World, he was part of the team which oversaw cuts to the corporation's World Service.

=== Director of Communications ===
On 2 February 2011, he was appointed Andy Coulson's replacement as Director of Communications at 10 Downing Street, having been recommended by Coulson for the job. He took up this position on 28 February. He committed a political faux pas at the following weekend's Conservative Party Spring Conference after accidentally showing his notes for David Cameron's keynote speech to photographers.

On 24 May 2012, Oliver was named in documents submitted to the Leveson Inquiry into media standards as being one of eight Downing Street advisers to have had contact with News Corporation lobbyist Frédéric Michel. Oliver and Michel dined together in July 2011 after news broke concerning the News of the World phone hacking scandal, but Oliver did not have to declare the dinner on the register of interests as they split the bill.

On 28 May 2012, video footage was posted on the internet of Oliver reprimanding BBC News correspondent Norman Smith over the content of a story concerning a memo Secretary of State for Culture, Media and Sport Jeremy Hunt sent to David Cameron about his thoughts on News Corporation's bid to take full control of BSkyB. Oliver did not appear to realise the cameras were rolling during their exchange.

On 12 December 2012, it was claimed that during a telephone call to The Daily Telegraph Oliver had warned the newspaper against running a critical story on MPs expenses claimed by Culture Secretary Maria Miller because of her role in enacting proposals in the Leveson report. Downing Street denied that any threats were made. The Parliamentary Commission for Standards subsequently launched an investigation into Miller's expenses.

== Post-Downing Street career ==
Oliver was knighted in the 2016 Resignation Honours after David Cameron stepped down as prime minister in the wake of the European Union membership referendum.

After leaving Downing Street, Oliver wrote an account of the referendum campaign, published in October 2016. The book, Unleashing Demons: The Inside Story of Brexit, was serialised in The Mail on Sunday in September 2016, and claims that David Cameron felt "badly let down" by Theresa May (who was Home Secretary during the referendum campaign) because she failed to back the Remain side.

Oliver has become Principal at Teneo, a consultancy, where he will advise on strategy.

== Business interests ==
From 2005 to 2011, he served as company secretary to Paya Ltd, a company founded by his wife, but declared his intention to relinquish this role upon taking up his position at Downing Street.

== In popular culture ==
Oliver was portrayed by actor Rory Kinnear in the 2019 HBO and Channel 4 produced drama entitled Brexit: The Uncivil War.

== Personal life ==
Oliver was married to BBC News presenter Joanna Gosling from 1996 to 2014, with whom he has three children.

Government offices
Preceded by Andy Coulson	Downing Street Director of Communications; 2011–2016	Succeeded by Katie Perrior
