= Conservative Collegiate Forum =

The Conservative Collegiate Forum (CCF) was the British Conservative Party's national student organisation from 1986 to 1998. It was the successor to the Federation of Conservative Students. From 1990 onwards, the organisation was widely but unofficially known as Conservative Students. CCF existed until the merger with Young Conservatives and Conservative Graduates in 1998 to create Conservative Future.
