= Fran Unsworth =

British radio executive (born 1957)

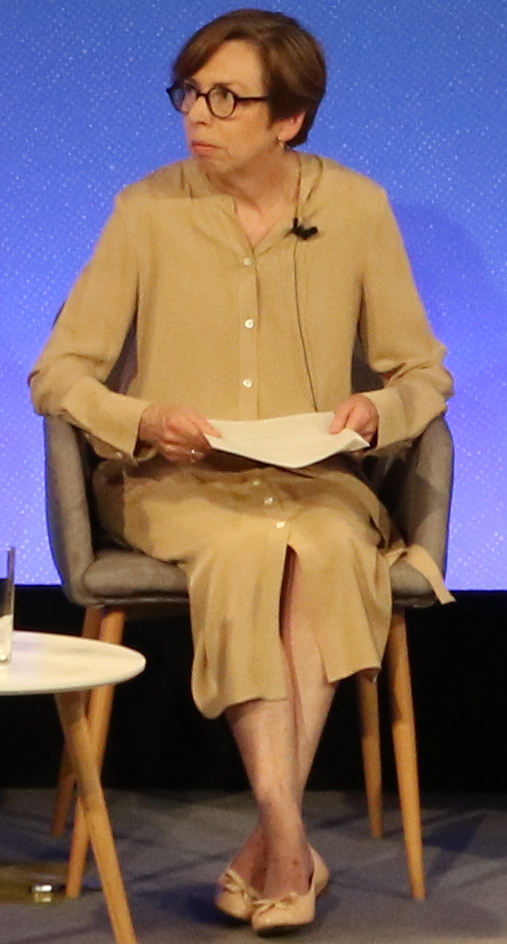
- Unsworth in 2019
- Born: Francesca Mary Unsworth; 29 December 1957 (age 68); Stoke-on-Trent, Staffordshire, England
- Education: University of Manchester
- Occupations: Journalist; media executive
- Years active: 1981–2022
- Employer: BBC
- Title: Director of News and Current Affairs, BBC News

Francesca Mary Unsworth (born 29 December 1957) is a British journalist and media executive. From January 2018 to 2022, she was director of News and Current Affairs for BBC News. She succeeded James Harding. Before then, she served in various senior positions in the BBC, including director of the BBC World Service Group, acting director of News at the BBC from November 2012 until August 2013, deputy director of News and Current Affairs, and a member of the BBC's executive board.

== Early life and education ==
Unsworth was born on 1957 in Stoke-on-Trent, Staffordshire. She attended St Dominic's High School, Stoke-on-Trent, a direct grant grammar school. She studied drama at the University of Manchester but was unable to get into a drama school and so switched careers to publishing in London.

== BBC career ==
Unsworth began her broadcasting career in local radio, working at BBC Radio Leicester and BBC Radio Bristol, before going on to become producer of Radio 1's Newsbeat. In 1990, she moved to Radio 4 and was based in Washington as a radio producer for the network during the Gulf crisis of 1990–1991. She worked as a producer on The World at One and PM while at Radio 4.

She moved to the BBC's Newsgathering Department in 1993, where she had responsibility for UK domestic news, and was a producer and editor for the BBC One O'Clock News and the BBC Six O'Clock News. Unsworth was appointed Head of Newsgathering in January 2005.

In December 2005, Unsworth appeared on the BBC's Newswatch programme, responding to accusations of double standards in BBC News reporting of racial crimes when white people were the victims. Complainants suggested the BBC buried stories such as the racist murder of Kriss Donald, with comparable murders involving black victims given twelve times more coverage and the opening of an arts centre in Gateshead reported in preference to Donald's murder. Unsworth admitted the case had not been covered sufficiently and that there had been space to do so. Her department again failed to cover the case adequately the following year. In 2011, BBC News was criticised for referring to looters in the 2011 London riots as "protesters", even two days into the violence. In response to 62 complaints about the matter, Unsworth conceded that the BBC had been wrong to do so.

In November 2012, Unsworth was appointed acting director of News after Helen Boaden stepped aside while Nick Pollard prepared his report into the BBC's non-coverage of the Jimmy Savile sexual abuse scandal. She ceased working in this role in August 2013 and was appointed deputy director of News and Current Affairs. In November 2013, Unsworth was replaced as Head of Newsgathering by Jonathan Munro. She was promoted to director of News and Current Affairs in 2018 replacing James Harding.

In August 2014, Unsworth ordered helicopter filming of a police raid on a mansion belonging to singer Cliff Richard. The coverage led to Richard suing the BBC for breach of privacy. On 8 May 2018, The Guardian reported: "Sir Cliff Richard is seeking a payment of at least £560,000 from the BBC following the broadcaster's coverage of a police raid at his home in 2014." In July, Richard was awarded £210,000 in damages and the BBC agreed to pay £2 million in legal costs. Unsworth apologised to Richard and stated that "there were elements of its coverage that should have been handled differently" but criticised the ruling as an attack on liberty and press freedoms.

In January 2018, she was invited to present evidence at a parliamentary select committee meeting on gender pay gap at the BBC. This was initiated by the resignation of the then China editor Carrie Gracie in the same month over the same issue. Unsworth defended the pay gap between Grace and the BBC's North America editor Jon Sopel as Sopel was "on air twice as much" and that "The China job [is] a more features-based agenda". Gracie also reported that Unsworth had privately commented to a colleague that the pay gap was due to her being part-time. Unsworth denied this stating "I did the contract, I knew she wasn't" but apologised to her for causing a 'misunderstanding' due to 'loose' language. BBC and Gracie agreed to an equal pay deal in June 2018 and she donated the back pay awarded to charity.

The BBC announced in 2021 that Unsworth would leave her role as director of News and Current Affairs in 2022, she was succeeded by ITN CEO Deborah Turness.

== Other roles ==
Unsworth was president of the Society of Editors between 2011 and 2012, and is a board member of the organisation. She is also a board member of the European Union's Erasmus Mundus programme.

Media offices
Preceded by Peter Horrocks; 2009–2015	Director, BBC World Service; 2015–2017	Succeeded by Jamie Angus; 2018–present
