= Peter Havard-Williams =

Welsh librarian and library educator

- Born: 11 July 1922
- Died: 16 August 1995 (aged 73)
- Education: Oxford; University College of Swansea
- Occupations: Librarian; library education
- Employer(s): Swansea University; University of Liverpool; University of Otago; Queen's University Belfast; Ottawa University; Loughborough University; University of Botswana
- Known for: Chief Librarian to the Council of Europe
- Spouse(s): Rosine Cousin; Eileen Cumming
- Awards: Ordre des Arts et des Lettres

Peter Havard-Williams (11 July 1922 – 16 August 1995) was a Welsh librarian and library educator. In the mid-1980s, he served as Chief Librarian to the Council of Europe.

== Early years ==
Havard-Williams received degrees from universities in Wales and Oxford. In 1949, he wrote Thought and Sense in the Philosophy of Saint Thomas Aquinas as his Master's thesis at the University College of Swansea.

== Career ==
Havard-Williams held senior posts in the libraries of Swansea University and the University of Liverpool. In 1956, he was appointed Librarian of New Zealand's University of Otago where he planned for the construction of a large library building, and served as editor of the University of Otago Press. For a decade, starting in 1961, he was University Librarian at Queen's University Belfast in Belfast, Northern Ireland, succeeding Jack Jacob Graneek. In 1964, while at Queen's, Havard-Williams founded the School of Library Studies (afterwards the School of Library and Information Studies, SLIS) and also served as its director. Between 1971 and 1972, he was Dean and Professor in Ottawa University's Library School. From 1972 until 1987, he was founding Professor and Head of Department at Loughborough University's Department of Library and Information Studies. It was here that he developed undergraduate and postgraduate programs that gave British librarians the specific knowledge and skills needed in a profession that had become increasingly more technology-based. After spending two years serving as a consultant and Chief Librarian to the Council of Europe in 1986–87, he received an appointment as Professor and Head of Department of Library and Information Studies at the University of Botswana in 1988.

"It is evident in the last decade that the importance of standards has been enhanced, partly from a need for economy and efficiency, but also because of the development of information services, the increase in their importance in modern technological society, and hence their increased contact with technology itself -- in particular, with computer processing." (P. Havard-Williams, 1982)

—

Havard-Williams espoused the adoption of international library standards in his article, International Standards. He wrote on librarianship, including the conference papers Co-ordination of Library Resources in Ireland, and Planning Information Manpower and the report Teaching Methods in North American Library Schools: report to British Library Research and Development Department of study visit overseas (with J. M. Brittain, BL R & D report 5712, 1982).

A collector of Bloomsbury Group first editions, he also wrote on one of Bloomsbury's best known members, Virginia Woolf. These writings included, Bateau ivre: the symbol of the sea in Virginia Woolf's "The Waves" (1953), Perceptive contemplation in the work of Virginia Woolf (in English Studies, vol. 35, 1954), and Mystical Experience in Virginia Woolf's The Waves (with Margaret Havard-Williams, in Essays in Criticism, vol. 4, 1954). Also an author of lighter pieces, Havard-Williams wrote on Winnie the Pooh entitled, Why pooh-pooh Pooh? Isn't he universal?

== Personal life ==
He married Rosine Cousin in 1964; they had two daughters. After Rosine's death in 1973, he married Eileen Cumming in 1976; they had one daughter.

In 1994, he was awarded France's Ordre des Arts et des Lettres. Havard-Williams died in Loughborough in 1995. A collection of his Publications and papers, 1948-1977 (569 leaves) is in the British Library.
