= BBC News =

News division of the British Broadcasting Corporation

- Logo used since 2022
- Type: Division
- Industry: Broadcast media
- Founded: 14 November 1922; 103 years ago
- Headquarters: Broadcasting House, London
- Area served: Specific services for United Kingdom and rest of world
- Key people: Deborah Turness (CEO, News and Current Affairs); Jonathan Munro (director of Journalism and Deputy CEO)
- Services: Radio, internet, and television broadcasts
- Number of employees: 7,000 (5,500 journalists)
- Parent: BBC
- Divisions: BBC News Online; BBC News (TV Channel)
- Website: bbc.co.uk (UK); bbc.com (global)

BBC News is an operational business division of the British Broadcasting Corporation (BBC) responsible for the gathering and broadcasting of news and current affairs in the UK and around the world. The department is the world's largest broadcast news organisation and generates about 120 hours of radio and television output each day, as well as online news coverage. The service has over 5,500 journalists working across its output including in 50 foreign news bureaus where more than 250 foreign correspondents are stationed. Deborah Turness has been the CEO of news and current affairs since September 2022.

In 2019, it was reported in an Ofcom report that the BBC spent £136m on news during the period April 2018 to March 2019. BBC News' domestic, global and online news divisions are housed within the largest live newsroom in Europe, in Broadcasting House in central London. Parliamentary coverage is produced and broadcast from studios in London. Through BBC English Regions, the BBC also has regional centres across England and national news centres in Northern Ireland, Scotland and Wales. All nations and English regions produce their own local news programmes and other current affairs and sport programmes.

The BBC is a quasi-autonomous corporation authorised by royal charter, making it operationally independent of the government. As of 2024, the BBC reaches an average of 450 million people per week, with the BBC World Service accounting for 320 million people.

== History ==
=== Early years ===
This is London calling – 2LO calling. Here is the first general news bulletin, copyright by Reuters, Press Association, Exchange Telegraph and Central News.

— BBC news programme opening during the 1920s

The British Broadcasting Company broadcast its first radio bulletin from radio station 2LO on 14 November 1922. Wishing to avoid competition, newspaper publishers persuaded the government to ban the BBC from broadcasting news before 7 pm, and to force it to use wire service copy instead of reporting on its own. The BBC gradually gained the right to edit the copy and, in 1934, created its own news operation. However, it could not broadcast news before 6 p.m. until World War II. In addition to news, Gaumont British and Movietone cinema newsreels had been broadcast on the TV service since 1936, with the BBC producing its own equivalent Television Newsreel programme from January 1948. A weekly Children's Newsreel was inaugurated on 23 April 1950, to around 350,000 receivers. The network began simulcasting its radio news on television in 1946, with a still picture of Big Ben. Televised bulletins began on 5 July 1954, broadcast from leased studios within Alexandra Palace in London.

The public's interest in television and live events was stimulated by Elizabeth II's coronation in 1953. It is estimated that up to 27 million people viewed the programme in the UK, overtaking radio's audience of 12 million for the first time. Those live pictures were fed from 21 cameras in central London to Alexandra Palace for transmission, and then on to other UK transmitters opened in time for the event. That year, there were around two million TV Licences held in the UK, rising to over three million the following year, and four and a half million by 1955.

=== 1950s ===
Television news, although physically separate from its radio counterpart, was still firmly under radio news' control in the 1950s. Correspondents provided reports for both outlets, and the first televised bulletin, shown on 5 July 1954 on the then BBC television service and presented by Richard Baker, involved his providing narration off-screen while stills were shown. This was then followed by the customary Television Newsreel with a recorded commentary by John Snagge (and on other occasions by Andrew Timothy).

On-screen newsreaders were introduced a year later in 1955 – Kenneth Kendall (the first to appear in vision), Robert Dougall, and Richard Baker—three weeks before ITN's launch on 21 September 1955.

Mainstream television production had started to move out of Alexandra Palace in 1950 to larger premises – mainly at Lime Grove Studios in Shepherd's Bush, west London – taking Current Affairs (then known as Talks Department) with it. It was from here that the first Panorama, a new documentary programme, was transmitted on 11 November 1953, with Richard Dimbleby becoming anchor in 1955.

In 1958, Hugh Carleton Greene became head of News and Current Affairs.

=== 1960s ===
On 1 January 1960, Greene became Director-General. Greene made changes that were aimed at making BBC reporting more similar to its competitor ITN, which had been highly rated by study groups held by Greene.

A newsroom was created at Alexandra Palace, television reporters were recruited and given the opportunity to write and voice their own scripts, without having to cover stories for radio too.

On 20 June 1960, Nan Winton, the first female BBC network newsreader, appeared in vision. 19 September 1960 saw the start of the radio news and current affairs programme The Ten O'clock News. BBC2 started transmission on 20 April 1964 and began broadcasting a new show, Newsroom.

The World at One, a lunchtime news programme, began on 4 October 1965 on the then Home Service, and the year before News Review had started on television. News Review was a summary of the week's news, first broadcast on Sunday, 26 April 1964 on BBC 2 and harking back to the weekly Newsreel Review of the Week, produced from 1951, to open programming on Sunday evenings–the difference being that this incarnation had subtitles for the deaf and hard-of-hearing. As this was the decade before electronic caption generation, each superimposition ("super") had to be produced on paper or card, synchronised manually to studio and news footage, committed to tape during the afternoon, and broadcast early evening. Thus Sundays were no longer a quiet day for news at Alexandra Palace. The programme ran until the 1980s – by then using electronic captions, known as Anchor – to be superseded by Ceefax subtitling (a similar Teletext format), and the signing of such programmes as See Hear (from 1981).

On Sunday 17 September 1967, The World This Weekend, a weekly news and current affairs programme, launched on what was then Home Service, but soon-to-be Radio 4.

Preparations for colour began in the autumn of 1967 and on Thursday 7 March 1968 Newsroom on BBC2 moved to an early evening slot, becoming the first UK news programme to be transmitted in colour – from Studio A at Alexandra Palace. News Review and Westminster (the latter a weekly review of Parliamentary happenings) were "colourised" shortly after.

However, much of the insert material was still in black and white, as initially only a part of the film coverage shot in and around London was on colour reversal film stock, and all regional and many international contributions were still in black and white. Colour facilities at Alexandra Palace were technically very limited for the next eighteen months, as it had only one RCA colour Quadruplex videotape machine and, eventually two Pye plumbicon colour telecines–although the news colour service started with just one.

Black and white national bulletins on BBC 1 continued to originate from Studio B on weekdays, along with Town and Around, the London regional "opt out" programme broadcast throughout the 1960s (and the BBC's first regional news programme for the South East), until it started to be replaced by Nationwide on Tuesday to Thursday from Lime Grove Studios early in September 1969. Town and Around was never to make the move to Television Centre – instead it became London This Week which aired on Mondays and Fridays only, from the new TVC studios.

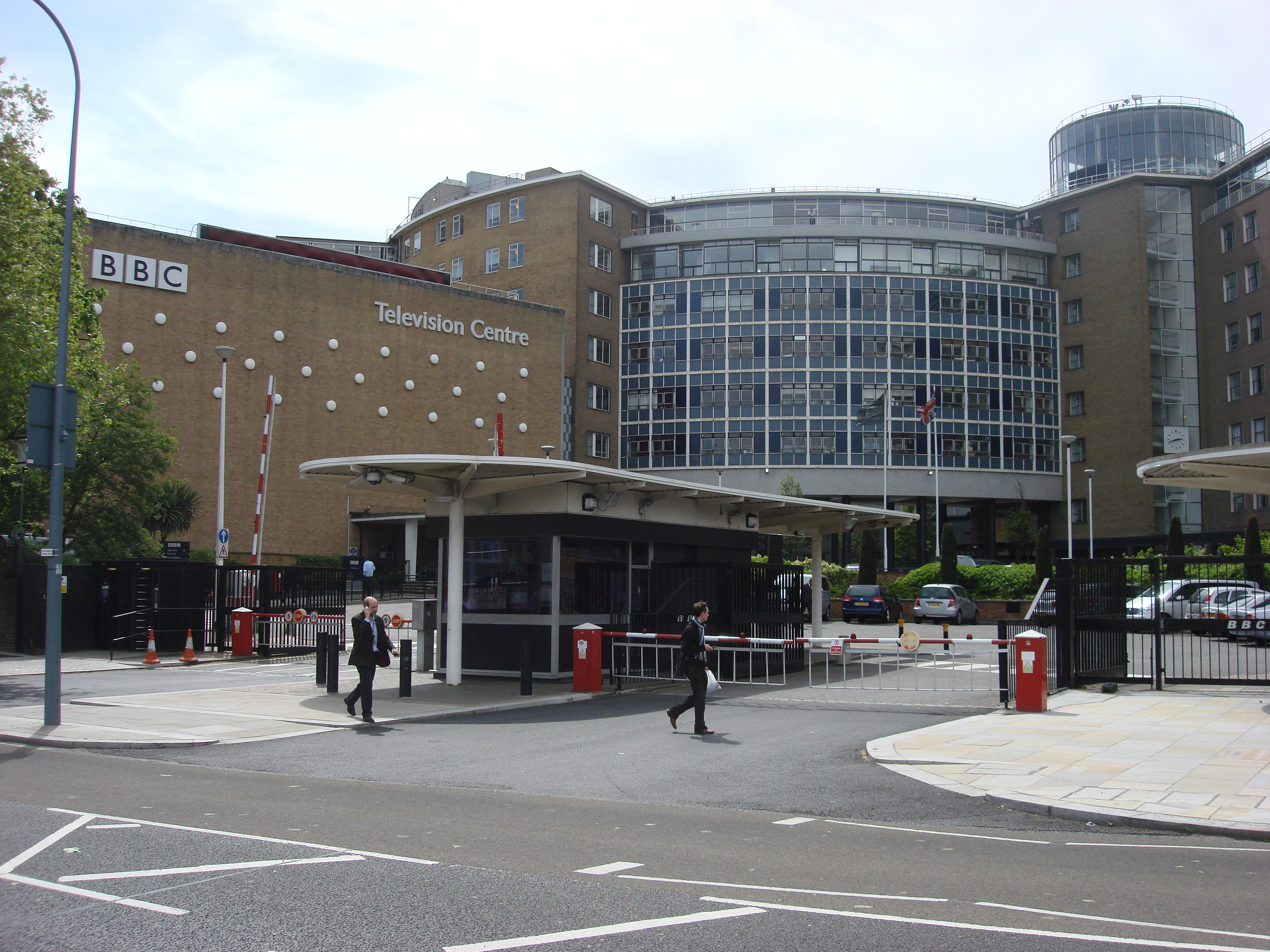
Television News moved to BBC Television Centre in September 1969.

The BBC moved production out of Alexandra Palace in 1969. BBC Television News resumed operations the next day with a lunchtime bulletin on BBC1 – in black and white – from Television Centre, where it remained until March 2013.

This move to a smaller studio with better technical facilities allowed Newsroom and News Review to replace back projection with colour-separation overlay. During the 1960s, satellite communication had become possible; however, it was some years before digital line-store conversion was able to undertake the process seamlessly.

=== 1970s ===
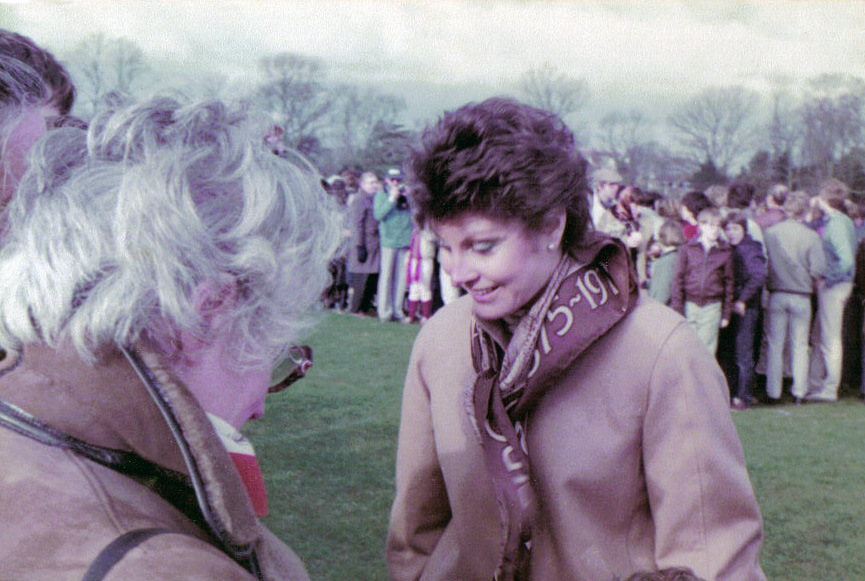
Angela Rippon, pictured in 1983, became the first female news presenter in 1975.

On 14 September 1970, the first Nine O'Clock News was broadcast on television. Robert Dougall presented the first week from studio N1 – described by The Guardian as "a sort of polystyrene padded cell"—the bulletin having been moved from the earlier time of 20.50 as a response to the ratings achieved by ITN's News at Ten, introduced three years earlier on the rival ITV. Richard Baker and Kenneth Kendall presented subsequent weeks, thus echoing those first television bulletins of the mid-1950s.

Angela Rippon became the first female news presenter of the Nine O'Clock News in 1975. Her work outside the news was controversial at the time, appearing on The Morecambe and Wise Christmas Show in 1976 singing and dancing.

The first edition of John Craven's Newsround, initially intended only as a short series and later renamed just Newsround, came from studio N3 on 4 April 1972.

Afternoon television news bulletins during the mid to late 1970s were broadcast from the BBC newsroom itself, rather than one of the three news studios. The newsreader would present to camera while sitting on the edge of a desk; behind him staff would be seen working busily at their desks. This period corresponded with when the Nine O'Clock News got its next makeover, and would use a CSO background of the newsroom from that very same camera each weekday evening.

Also in the mid-1970s, the late night news on BBC2 was briefly renamed Newsnight, but this was not to last, or be the same programme as we know today – that would be launched in 1980 – and it soon reverted to being just a news summary with the early evening BBC2 news expanded to become Newsday.

News on radio was to change in the 1970s, and on Radio 4 in particular, brought about by the arrival of new editor Peter Woon from television news and the implementation of the Broadcasting in the Seventies report. These included the introduction of correspondents into news bulletins where previously only a newsreader would present, as well as the inclusion of content gathered in the preparation process. New programmes were also added to the daily schedule, PM and The World Tonight as part of the plan for the station to become a "wholly speech network". Newsbeat launched as the news service on Radio 1 on 10 September 1973.

On 23 September 1974, a teletext system which was launched to bring news content on television screens using text only was launched. Engineers originally began developing such a system to bring news to deaf viewers, but the system was expanded. The Ceefax service became much more diverse before it ceased on 23 October 2012: it not only had subtitling for all channels, it also gave information such as weather, flight times and film reviews.

By the end of the decade, the practice of shooting on film for inserts in news broadcasts was declining, with the introduction of ENG technology into the UK. The equipment would gradually become less cumbersome – the BBC's first attempts had been using a Philips colour camera with backpack base station and separate portable Sony U-matic recorder in the latter half of the decade.

=== 1980s ===
In 1980, the Iranian Embassy Siege had been shot electronically by the BBC Television News Outside broadcasting team, and the work of reporter Kate Adie, broadcasting live from Prince's Gate, was nominated for BAFTA actuality coverage, but this time beaten by ITN for the 1980 award.

Newsnight, the news and current affairs programme, was due to go on air on 23 January 1980, although trade union disagreements meant that its launch from Lime Grove was postponed by a week. On 27 August 1981 Moira Stuart became the first African Caribbean female newsreader to appear on British television.

By 1982, ENG technology had become sufficiently reliable for Bernard Hesketh to use an Ikegami camera to cover the Falklands War, coverage for which he won the "Royal Television Society Cameraman of the Year" award and a BAFTA nomination – the first time that BBC News had relied upon an electronic camera, rather than film, in a conflict zone. BBC News won the BAFTA for its actuality coverage, however the event has become remembered in television terms for Brian Hanrahan's reporting where he coined the phrase "I'm not allowed to say how many planes joined the raid, but I counted them all out and I counted them all back" to circumvent restrictions, and which has become cited as an example of good reporting under pressure.

The first BBC breakfast television programme, Breakfast Time also launched during the 1980s, on 17 January 1983 from Lime Grove Studio E and two weeks before its ITV rival TV-am. Frank Bough, Selina Scott, and Nick Ross helped to wake viewers with a relaxed style of presenting.

The Six O'Clock News first aired on 3 September 1984, eventually becoming the most watched news programme in the UK (however, since 2006 it has been overtaken by the BBC News at Ten). In October 1984, images of millions of people starving to death in the Ethiopian famine were shown in Michael Buerk's Six O'Clock News reports. The BBC News crew were the first to document the famine, with Buerk's report on 23 October describing it as "a biblical famine in the 20th century" and "the closest thing to hell on Earth". The BBC News report shocked Britain, motivating its citizens to inundate relief agencies, such as Save the Children, with donations, and to bring global attention to the crisis in Ethiopia. The news report was also watched by Bob Geldof, who would organise the charity single "Do They Know It's Christmas?" to raise money for famine relief followed by the Live Aid concert in July 1985.

Starting in 1981, the BBC gave a common theme to its main news bulletins with new electronic titles–a set of computer-animated "stripes" forming a circle on a red background with a "BBC News" typescript appearing below the circle graphics, and a theme tune consisting of brass and keyboards. The Nine used a similar (striped) number 9. The red background was replaced by a blue from 1985 until 1987.

By 1987, the BBC had decided to re-brand its bulletins and established individual styles again for each one with differing titles and music, the weekend and holiday bulletins branded in a similar style to the Nine, although the "stripes" introduction continued to be used until 1989 on occasions where a news bulletin was screened out of the running order of the schedule.

In 1987, John Birt resurrected the practice of correspondents working for both TV and radio with the introduction of bi-media journalism.

=== 1990s ===
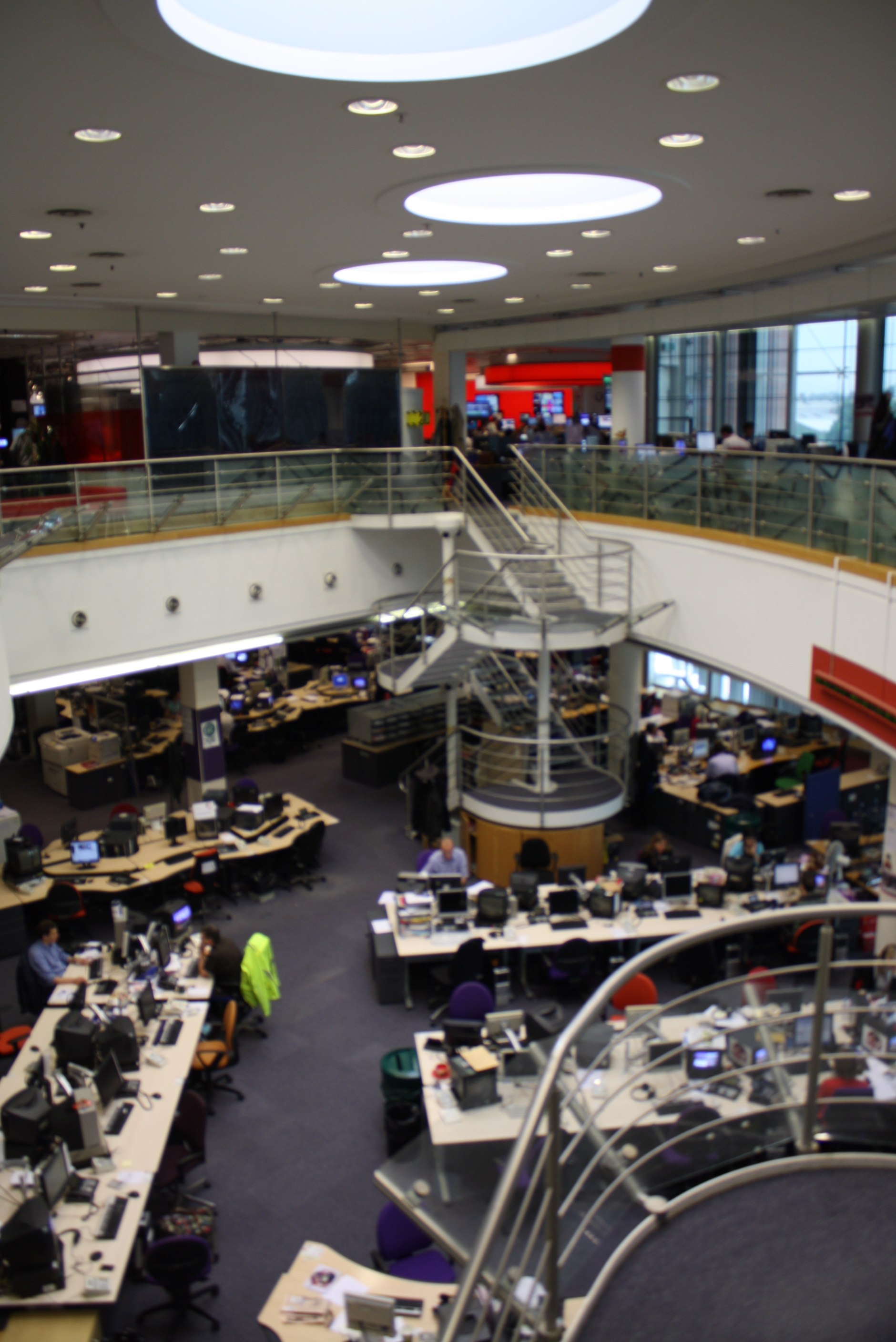
The combined newsroom for domestic television and radio was opened at Television Centre in West London in 1998.

During the 1990s, a wider range of services began to be offered by BBC News, with the split of BBC World Service Television to become BBC World (news and current affairs), and BBC Prime (light entertainment). Content for a 24-hour news channel was thus required, followed in 1997 with the launch of domestic equivalent BBC News 24. Rather than set bulletins, ongoing reports and coverage was needed to keep both channels functioning and meant a greater emphasis in budgeting for both was necessary. In 1998, after 66 years at Broadcasting House, the BBC Radio News operation moved to BBC Television Centre.

New technology, provided by Silicon Graphics, came into use in 1993 for a re-launch of the main BBC 1 bulletins, creating a virtual set which appeared to be much larger than it was physically. The relaunch also brought all bulletins into the same style of set with only small changes in colouring, titles, and music to differentiate each. A computer generated cut-glass sculpture of the BBC coat of arms was the centrepiece of the programme titles until the large scale corporate rebranding of news services in 1999.

In November 1997, BBC News Online was launched, following individual webpages for major news events such as the 1996 Olympic Games, 1997 general election, and the death of Princess Diana.

In 1999, the biggest relaunch occurred, with BBC One bulletins, BBC World, BBC News 24, and BBC News Online all adopting a common style. One of the most significant changes was the gradual adoption of the corporate image by the BBC regional news programmes, giving a common style across local, national and international BBC television news. This also included Newyddion, the main news programme of Welsh language channel S4C, produced by BBC News Wales.

=== 2000s ===
Following the relaunch of BBC News in 1999, regional headlines were included at the start of the BBC One news bulletins in 2000. The English regions did however lose five minutes at the end of their bulletins, due to a new headline round-up at 18:55. 2000 also saw the Nine O'Clock News moved to the later time of 22:00. This was in response to ITN who had just moved their popular News at Ten programme to 23:00. ITN briefly returned News at Ten but following poor ratings when head-to-head against the BBC's Ten O'Clock News, the ITN bulletin was moved to 22.30, where it remained until 14 January 2008.

The retirement in 2009 of Peter Sissons and departure of Michael Buerk from the Ten O'Clock News led to changes in the BBC One bulletin presenting team on 20 January 2003. The Six O'Clock News became double headed with George Alagiah and Sophie Raworth after Huw Edwards and Fiona Bruce moved to present the Ten. A new set design featuring a projected fictional newsroom backdrop was introduced, followed on 16 February 2004 by new programme titles to match those of BBC News 24.

BBC News 24 and BBC World introduced a new style of presentation in December 2003, that was slightly altered on 5 July 2004 to mark 50 years of BBC Television News.

On 7 March 2005 director general Mark Thompson launched the "Creative Futures" project to restructure the organisation.

The individual positions of editor of the One and Six O'Clock News were replaced by a new daytime position in November 2005. Kevin Bakhurst became the first Controller of BBC News 24, replacing the position of editor. Amanda Farnsworth became daytime editor while Craig Oliver was later named editor of the Ten O'Clock News.

Bulletins received new titles and a new set design in May 2006, to allow for Breakfast to move into the main studio for the first time since 1997. The new set featured Barco videowall screens with a background of the London skyline used for main bulletins and originally an image of cirrus clouds against a blue sky for Breakfast. This was later replaced following viewer criticism. The studio bore similarities with the ITN-produced ITV News in 2004, though ITN uses a CSO virtual studio rather than the actual screens at BBC News.

BBC News became part of a new BBC Journalism group in November 2006 as part of a restructuring of the BBC. The then-Director of BBC News, Helen Boaden reported to the then-Deputy Director-General and head of the journalism group, Mark Byford until he was made redundant in 2010.

On 18 October 2007, ED Mark Thompson announced a six-year plan, "Delivering Creative Futures" (based on his project begun in March 2005), merging the television current affairs department into a new "News Programmes" division. Thompson's announcement, in response to a £2 billion shortfall in funding, would, he said, deliver "a smaller but fitter BBC" in the digital age, by cutting its payroll and, in 2013, selling Television Centre.

The various separate newsrooms for television, radio and online operations were merged into a single multimedia newsroom. Programme making within the newsrooms was brought together to form a multimedia programme making department. BBC World Service director Peter Horrocks said that the changes would achieve efficiency at a time of cost-cutting at the BBC. In his blog, he wrote that by using the same resources across the various broadcast media meant fewer stories could be covered, or by following more stories, there would be fewer ways to broadcast them.

A new graphics and video playout system was introduced for production of television bulletins in January 2007. This coincided with a new structure to BBC World News bulletins, editors favouring a section devoted to analysing the news stories reported on.

The first new BBC News bulletin since the Six O'Clock News was announced in July 2007 following a successful trial in the Midlands. The summary, lasting 90 seconds, has been broadcast at 20:00 on weekdays since December 2007 and bears similarities with 60 Seconds on BBC Three, but also includes headlines from the various BBC regions and a weather summary.

As part of a long-term cost cutting programme, bulletins were renamed the BBC News at One, Six and Ten respectively in April 2008 while BBC News 24 was renamed BBC News and moved into the same studio as the bulletins at BBC Television Centre. BBC World was renamed BBC World News and regional news programmes were also updated with the new presentation style, designed by Lambie-Nairn.

2008 also saw tri-media introduced across TV, radio, and online.

The studio moves also meant that Studio N9, previously used for BBC World, was closed, and operations moved to the previous studio of BBC News 24. Studio N9 was later refitted to match the new branding, and was used for the BBC's UK local elections and European elections coverage in early June 2009.

=== 2010s ===
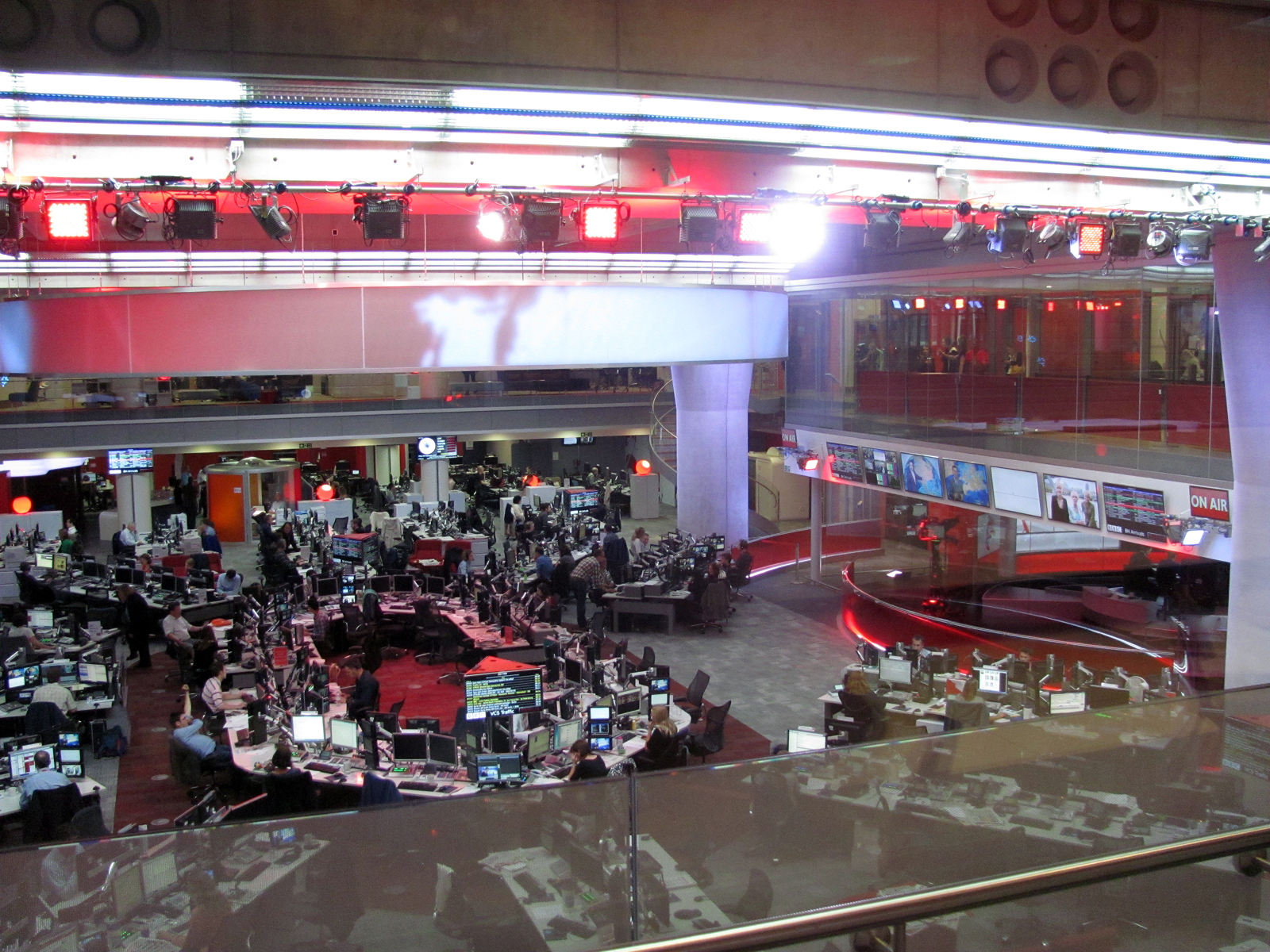
The new newsroom in Broadcasting House

A strategy review of the BBC in March 2010, confirmed that having "the best journalism in the world" would form one of five key editorial policies, as part of changes subject to public consultation and BBC Trust approval.

After a period of suspension in late 2012, Helen Boaden ceased to be the Director of BBC News. On 16 April 2013, incoming BBC Director-General Tony Hall named James Harding, a former editor of The Times of London newspaper as Director of News and Current Affairs.

From August 2012 to March 2013, all news operations moved from Television Centre to new facilities in the refurbished and extended Broadcasting House, in Portland Place. The move began in October 2012, and also included the BBC World Service, which moved from Bush House following the expiry of the BBC's lease. This new extension to the north and east, referred to as "New Broadcasting House", includes several new state-of-the-art radio and television studios centred around an 11-storey atrium. The move began with the domestic programme The Andrew Marr Show on 2 September 2012, and concluded with the move of the BBC News channel and domestic news bulletins on 18 March 2013. The newsroom houses all domestic bulletins and programmes on both television and radio, as well as the BBC World Service international radio networks and the BBC World News international television channel.

BBC News and CBS News established an editorial and newsgathering partnership in 2017, replacing an earlier long-standing partnership between BBC News and ABC News.

In an October 2018 Simmons Research survey of 38 news organisations, BBC News was ranked the fourth most trusted news organisation by Americans, behind CBS News, ABC News and The Wall Street Journal.

=== 2020s ===
Logo used from 2019 to 2022

In January 2020 the BBC announced a BBC News savings target of £80 million per year by 2022, involving about 450 staff reductions from the current 6,000. BBC director of news and current affairs Fran Unsworth said there would be further moves toward digital broadcasting, in part to attract back a youth audience, and more pooling of reporters to stop separate teams covering the same news. A further 70 staff reductions were announced in July 2020.

BBC Three began airing the news programme The Catch Up in February 2022. It is presented by Levi Jouavel, Kirsty Grant, and Callum Tulley and aims to get the channel's target audience (16 to 34-year olds) to make sense of the world around them while also highlighting optimistic stories. Compared to its predecessor 60 Seconds, The Catch Up is three times longer, running for about three minutes and not airing during weekends.

According to its annual report as of December 2021, India has the largest number of people using BBC services in the world.

In May 2025, following the earthquake that hit Myanmar and Thailand, a television news bulletin (BBC News Myanmar) from the Burmese service using a vacated Voice of America satellite frequency began its broadcasts.

== Programming and reporting ==
In November 2023, BBC News joined with the International Consortium of Investigative Journalists, Paper Trail Media and 69 media partners including Distributed Denial of Secrets and the Organised Crime and Corruption Reporting Project (OCCRP) and more than 270 journalists in 55 countries and territories to produce the 'Cyprus Confidential' report on the financial network which supports the regime of Vladimir Putin, mostly with connections to Cyprus, and showed Cyprus to have strong links with high-up figures in the Kremlin, some of whom have been sanctioned. Government officials including Cyprus president Nikos Christodoulides and European lawmakers began responding to the investigation's findings in less than 24 hours, calling for reforms and launching probes.

=== Television ===
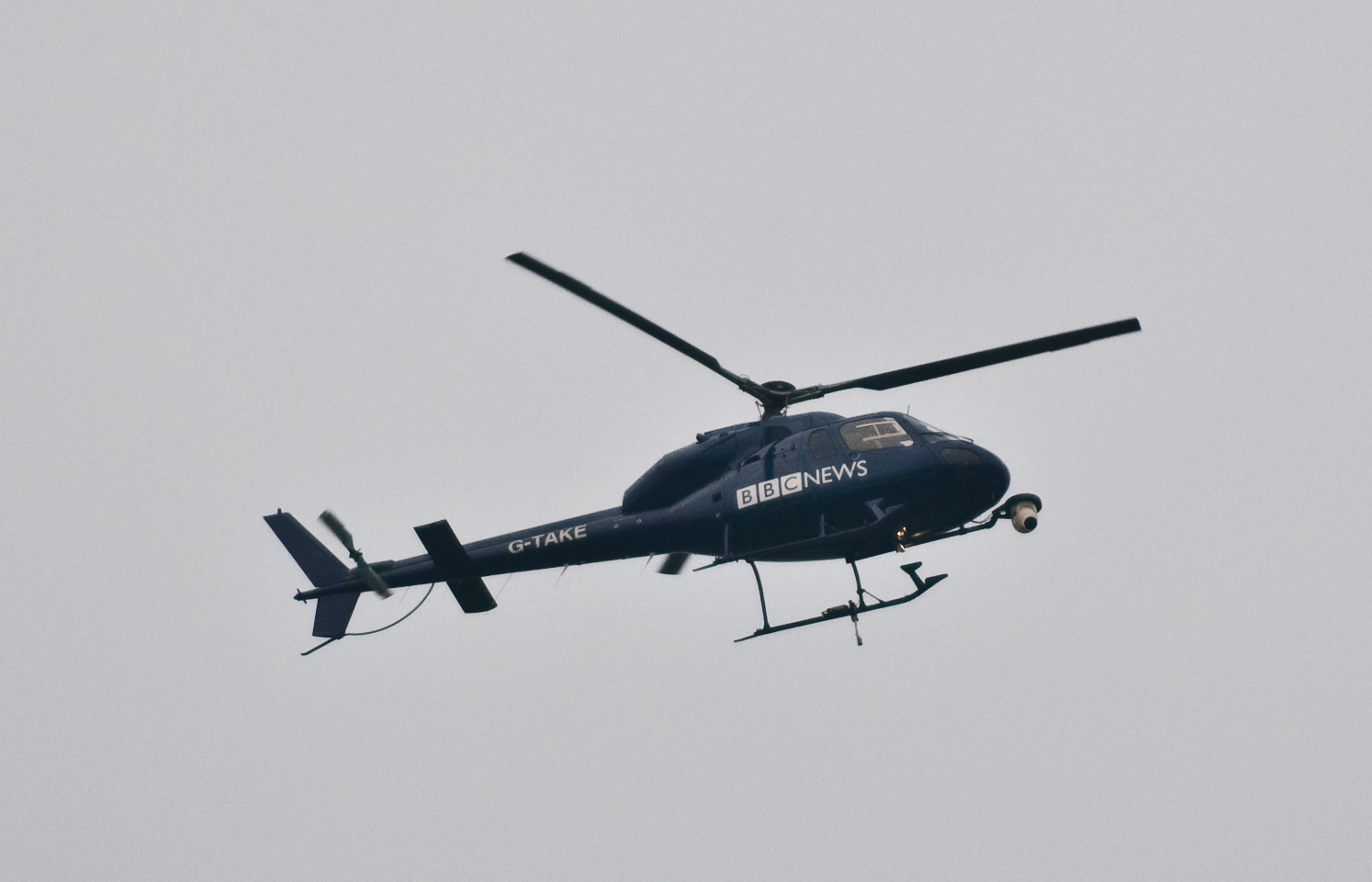
BBC News helicopter over London

BBC News is responsible for the news programmes and documentary content on the BBC's general television channels, as well as the news coverage on the BBC News Channel in the UK, and 22 hours of programming for the corporation's international BBC World News channel. Coverage for BBC Parliament is carried out on behalf of the BBC at Millbank Studios, though BBC News provides editorial and journalistic content. BBC News content is also output onto the BBC's digital interactive television services under the BBC Red Button brand, and until 2012, on the Ceefax teletext system.

The music on all BBC television news programmes was introduced in 1999 and composed by David Lowe. It was part of the re-branding which commenced in 1999 and features 'BBC Pips'. The general theme was used on bulletins on BBC One, News 24, BBC World and local news programmes in the BBC's Nations and Regions. Lowe was also responsible for the music on Radio One's Newsbeat. The theme has had several changes since 1999, the latest in March 2013.

The BBC Arabic Television news channel launched on 11 March 2008, a Persian-language channel followed on 14 January 2009, broadcasting from the Peel wing of Broadcasting House; both include news, analysis, interviews, sports and highly cultural programmes and are run by the BBC World Service and funded from a grant-in-aid from the British Foreign Office (and not the television licence).

The BBC Verify service was launched in 2023 to fact-check news stories, followed by BBC Verify Live in 2025.

=== Radio ===
BBC Radio News produces bulletins for the BBC's national radio stations and provides content for local BBC radio stations via the General News Service (GNS), a BBC-internal news distribution service. BBC News does not produce the BBC's regional news bulletins, which are produced individually by the BBC nations and regions themselves. The BBC World Service broadcasts to some 150 million people in English as well as 27 languages across the globe. BBC Radio News is a patron of the Radio Academy.

=== Online ===
BBC News Online is the BBC's news website. Launched in November 1997, it is one of the most popular news websites, with 1.2 billion website visits in April 2021, as well as being used by 60% of the UK's internet users for news. The website contains international news coverage as well as entertainment, sport, science, and political news.

Mobile apps for Android, iOS and Windows Phone systems have been provided since 2010. Many television and radio programmes are also available to view on the BBC iPlayer and BBC Sounds services. The BBC News channel is also available to view 24 hours a day, while video and radio clips are also available within online news articles.

In October 2019, BBC News Online launched a mirror on the dark web anonymity network Tor in an effort to circumvent censorship.

== Criticism ==
=== Political and commercial independence ===
The BBC is required by its charter to be free from both political and commercial influence and answers only to its viewers and listeners. This political objectivity is sometimes questioned. For instance, The Daily Telegraph (3 August 2005) carried a letter from the KGB defector Oleg Gordievsky, referring to it as "The Red Service". Books have been written on the subject, including anti-BBC works like Truth Betrayed by W J West and The Truth Twisters by Richard Deacon. The BBC has been accused of bias by Conservative MPs.

The BBC's Editorial Guidelines on Politics and Public Policy state that while "the voices and opinions of opposition parties must be routinely aired and challenged", "the government of the day will often be the primary source of news".

The BBC is regularly accused by the government of the day of bias in favour of the opposition and, by the opposition, of bias in favour of the government. Similarly, during times of war, the BBC is often accused by the UK government, or by strong supporters of British military campaigns, of being overly sympathetic to the view of the enemy. An edition of Newsnight at the start of the Falklands War in 1982 was described as "almost treasonable" by John Page, MP, who objected to Peter Snow saying "if we believe the British".

During the first Gulf War, critics of the BBC took to using the satirical name "Baghdad Broadcasting Corporation". During the Kosovo War, the BBC were labelled the "Belgrade Broadcasting Corporation" (suggesting favouritism towards the FR Yugoslavia government over ethnic Albanian rebels) by British ministers, although Slobodan Milosević (then FRY president) claimed that the BBC's coverage had been biased against his nation.

Conversely, some of those who style themselves anti-establishment in the United Kingdom or who oppose foreign wars have accused the BBC of pro-establishment bias or of refusing to give an outlet to "anti-war" voices. Following the 2003 invasion of Iraq, a study by the Cardiff University School of Journalism of the reporting of the war found that nine out of 10 references to weapons of mass destruction during the war assumed that Iraq possessed them, and only one in 10 questioned this assumption. It also found that, out of the main British broadcasters covering the war, the BBC was the most likely to use the British government and military as its source. It was also the least likely to use independent sources, like the Red Cross, who were more critical of the war. When it came to reporting Iraqi casualties, the study found fewer reports on the BBC than on the other three main channels. The report's author, Justin Lewis, wrote "Far from revealing an anti-war BBC, our findings tend to give credence to those who criticised the BBC for being too sympathetic to the government in its war coverage. Either way, it is clear that the accusation of BBC anti-war bias fails to stand up to any serious or sustained analysis."

Prominent BBC appointments are constantly assessed by the British media and political establishment for signs of political bias. The appointment of Greg Dyke as Director-General was highlighted by press sources because Dyke was a Labour Party member and former activist, as well as a friend of Tony Blair. The BBC's former Political Editor, Nick Robinson, was some years ago a chairman of the Young Conservatives and did, as a result, attract informal criticism from the former Labour government, but his predecessor Andrew Marr faced similar claims from the right because he was editor of The Independent, a liberal-leaning newspaper, before his appointment in 2000.

Mark Thompson, former Director-General of the BBC, admitted the organisation has been biased "towards the left" in the past. He said, "In the BBC I joined 30 years ago, there was, in much of current affairs, in terms of people's personal politics, which were quite vocal, a massive bias to the left". He then added, "The organization did struggle then with impartiality. Now it is a completely different generation. There is much less overt tribalism among the young journalists who work for the BBC."

Following the EU referendum in 2016, some critics suggested that the BBC was biased in favour of leaving the EU. For instance, in 2018, the BBC received complaints from people who took issue that the BBC was not sufficiently covering anti-Brexit marches while giving smaller-scale events hosted by former UKIP leader Nigel Farage more airtime. On the other hand, a poll released by YouGov showed that 45% of people who voted to leave the EU thought that the BBC was 'actively anti-Brexit' compared to 13% of the same kinds of voters who think the BBC is pro-Brexit.

=== India ===
In 2008, the BBC Hindi was criticised by some Indian outlets for referring to the terrorists who carried out the 2008 Mumbai attacks as "gunmen". The response to this added to prior criticism from some Indian commentators suggesting that the BBC may have an Indophobic bias. In March 2015, the BBC was criticised for a BBC Storyville documentary interviewing one of the rapists in India. In spite of a ban ordered by the Indian High court, the BBC still aired the documentary "India's Daughter" outside India.

=== Hutton Inquiry ===
BBC News was at the centre of a political controversy following the 2003 invasion of Iraq. Three BBC News reports (Andrew Gilligan's on Today, Gavin Hewitt's on The Ten O'Clock News and another on Newsnight) quoted an anonymous source that stated the British government (particularly the Prime Minister's office) had embellished the September Dossier with misleading exaggerations of Iraq's weapons of mass destruction capabilities. The government denounced the reports and accused the corporation of poor journalism.

In subsequent weeks the corporation stood by the report, saying that it had a reliable source. Following intense media speculation, David Kelly was named in the press as the source for Gilligan's story on 9 July 2003. Kelly was found dead, by suicide, in a field close to his home early on 18 July. An inquiry led by Lord Hutton was announced by the British government the following day to investigate the circumstances leading to Kelly's death, concluding that "Dr. Kelly took his own life."

In his report on 28 January 2004, Lord Hutton concluded that Gilligan's original accusation was "unfounded" and the BBC's editorial and management processes were "defective". In particular, it specifically criticised the chain of management that caused the BBC to defend its story. The BBC Director of News, Richard Sambrook, the report said, had accepted Gilligan's word that his story was accurate in spite of his notes being incomplete. Davies had then told the BBC Board of Governors that he was happy with the story and told the Prime Minister that a satisfactory internal inquiry had taken place. The Board of Governors, under the chairman's, Gavyn Davies, guidance, accepted that further investigation of the Government's complaints were unnecessary.

Because of the criticism in the Hutton report, Davies resigned on the day of publication. BBC News faced an important test, reporting on itself with the publication of the report, but by common consent (of the Board of Governors) managed this "independently, impartially and honestly". Davies' resignation was followed by the resignation of Director General, Greg Dyke, the following day, and the resignation of Gilligan on 30 January. While undoubtedly a traumatic experience for the corporation, an ICM poll in April 2003 indicated that it had sustained its position as the best and most trusted provider of news.

=== Israeli–Palestinian conflict ===
The BBC has faced accusations of holding both anti-Israel and anti-Palestine bias.

Douglas Davis, the London correspondent of The Jerusalem Post, has described the BBC's coverage of the Arab–Israeli conflict as "a relentless, one-dimensional portrayal of Israel as a demonic, criminal state and Israelis as brutal oppressors [which] bears all the hallmarks of a concerted campaign of vilification that, wittingly or not, has the effect of delegitimising the Jewish state and pumping oxygen into a dark old European hatred that dared not speak its name for the past half-century.". However two large independent studies, one conducted by Loughborough University and the other by Glasgow University's Media Group concluded that Israeli perspectives are given greater coverage.

Critics of the BBC argue that the Balen Report proves systematic bias against Israel in headline news programming. The Daily Mail and The Daily Telegraph criticised the BBC for spending hundreds of thousands of British tax payers' pounds from preventing the report being released to the public.

Jeremy Bowen, the Middle East Editor for BBC world news, was singled out specifically for bias by the BBC Trust which concluded that he violated "BBC guidelines on accuracy and impartiality."

An independent panel appointed by the BBC Trust was set up in 2006 to review the impartiality of the BBC's coverage of the Israeli–Palestinian conflict. The panel's assessment was that "apart from individual lapses, there was little to suggest deliberate or systematic bias." While noting a "commitment to be fair accurate and impartial" and praising much of the BBC's coverage the independent panel concluded "that BBC output does not consistently give a full and fair account of the conflict. In some ways the picture is incomplete and, in that sense, misleading." It notes that, "the failure to convey adequately the disparity in the Israeli and Palestinian experience, [reflects] the fact that one side is in control and the other lives under occupation".

Writing in the Financial Times, Philip Stephens, one of the panellists, later accused the BBC's director-general, Mark Thompson, of misrepresenting the panel's conclusions. He further opined "My sense is that BBC news reporting has also lost a once iron-clad commitment to objectivity and a necessary respect for the democratic process. If I am right, the BBC, too, is lost". Mark Thompson published a rebuttal in the FT the next day.

The description by one BBC correspondent reporting on the funeral of Yassir Arafat that she had been left with tears in her eyes led to other questions of impartiality, particularly from Martin Walker in a guest opinion piece in The Times, who picked out the apparent case of Fayad Abu Shamala, the BBC Arabic Service correspondent, who told a Hamas rally on 6 May 2001, that journalists in Gaza were "waging the campaign shoulder to shoulder together with the Palestinian people".

Walker argues that the independent inquiry was flawed for two reasons. Firstly, because the time period over which it was conducted (August 2005 to January 2006) surrounded the Israeli withdrawal from Gaza and Ariel Sharon's stroke, which produced more positive coverage than usual. Furthermore, he wrote, the inquiry only looked at the BBC's domestic coverage, and excluded output on the BBC World Service and BBC World.

Tom Gross, writing for the National Review, criticised the BBC's coverage of Hamas suicide bombers, and its invitations of Jenny Tonge and Tom Paulin as guest commentators, claiming that Paulin had "compared Jewish settlers to Nazis". Paulin had previously stated that Israeli settlers should be "shot dead", and said he could "understand how suicide bombers feel".

The BBC also faced criticism for not airing a Disasters Emergency Committee aid appeal for Palestinians who suffered in Gaza during 22-day war there between late 2008 and early 2009. Most other major UK broadcasters did air this appeal, but rival Sky News did not.

British journalist Julie Burchill has accused BBC of creating a "climate of fear" for British Jews over its "excessive coverage" of Israel compared to other nations.

In light of the Gaza war, the BBC suspended seven Arab journalists over allegations of expressing support for Hamas via social media.

=== Partners ===
BBC and ABC share video segments and reporters as needed in producing their newscasts. with the BBC showing ABC World News Tonight with David Muir in the UK. However, in July 2017, the BBC announced a new partnership with CBS News allows both organisations to share video, editorial content, and additional newsgathering resources in New York, London, Washington and around the world.

BBC News subscribes to wire services from leading international agencies including PA Media (formerly Press Association), Reuters, and Agence France-Presse. In April 2017, the BBC dropped Associated Press in favour of an enhanced service from AFP.

=== The view of foreign governments ===
BBC News reporters and broadcasts are now and have in the past been banned in several countries primarily for reporting which has been unfavourable to the ruling government. For example, correspondents were banned by the former apartheid regime of South Africa. The BBC was banned in Zimbabwe under Mugabe for eight years as a terrorist organisation until being allowed to operate again over a year after the 2008 elections.

The BBC was banned in Burma (officially Myanmar) after their coverage and commentary on anti-government protests there in September 2007. The ban was lifted four years later in September 2011. Other cases have included Uzbekistan, China, and Pakistan. BBC Persian, the BBC's Persian language news site, was blocked from the Iranian internet in 2006. The BBC News website was made available in China again in March 2008, but as of October 2014, was blocked again.

In June 2015, the Rwandan government placed an indefinite ban on BBC broadcasts following the airing of a controversial documentary regarding the 1994 Rwandan genocide, Rwanda's Untold Story, broadcast on BBC2 on 1 October 2014. The UK's Foreign Office recognised "the hurt caused in Rwanda by some parts of the documentary".

In February 2017, reporters from the BBC (as well as the Daily Mail, The New York Times, Politico, CNN, and others) were denied access to a United States White House briefing.

In 2017, BBC India was banned for a period of five years from covering all national parks and sanctuaries in India. Following the withdrawal of CGTN's UK broadcaster licence on 4 February 2021 by Ofcom, China banned BBC News from airing in China.

== See also ==
- Category:BBC newsreaders and journalists
- Category:BBC television news shows
- List of current BBC newsreaders and reporters
- List of former BBC newsreaders and journalists
