= History of television licensing in the United Kingdom =

The first broadcasting receiving licence was introduced in 1904 to cover the reception of radio broadcasts. It is paid annually.

== Historical timeline ==
=== Amateur radio reception licensing ===
The introduction of receiving licences was implemented by the General Post Office (GPO) using powers within the Wireless Telegraphy Act 1904. Section 2 of the act allowed the Postmaster General to charge for the issuing of licenses permitting the "experimental" receipt of radio transmissions. The Wireless Telegraphy Act 1904 was introduced as a temporary measure, and required annual extensions by Parliament until replaced by the Wireless Telegraphy Act 1949.

A return made to Parliament in June 1906 showed that in the first two years of operation only sixty eight receiving licences were issued. By April 1913 the number had, according to figures then released by the GPO, risen to two thousand.

The First World War resulted in all licence holders receiving notice on 1 August 1914 from the Postmaster General that they were required to dismantle their receiving equipment, their broadcast receiving licences having been suspended.

In 1920, the Post Office licensed a small number of experimental transmitting stations, making general broadcasts.

=== BBC ===
"Licence to establish a wireless receiving station", issued on 3 November 1922, under the Wireless Telegraphy Act 1904, and with a "BBC" overstamp

At the instigation of the Post Office, the British Broadcasting Company was established in October 1922 by a group of radio manufacturers to produce radio programmes for the users of their products. Initially the broadcasts were funded by the sale of radio receiving sets, and carried sponsored programmes.

As part of the agreement with the Post Office, the Postmaster General, Neville Chamberlain, started to apply a condition to broadcast receiving licences that the equipment used be "Type Approved by Postmaster General" and marked with the BBC logo.

Initially, the fee for receiving licences was 10 shillings, and remained at that rate until after the Second World War.

With the forming of the public British Broadcasting Corporation in 1927, the Post Office dedicated nearly the entirety of licence fee income to the funding of the BBC.

==== Television ====
The standard broadcast receiving licences covered reception of the BBC's 405-line television service between November 1936 and September 1939 at no additional cost.

The outbreak of the Second World War in 1939 led to the suspension of television broadcasts in the UK.

The television licence was introduced in June 1946 to coincide with the post-war resumption of the BBC service the same month. Television licences always included a licence to receive radio broadcasts.

From 1971, only the reception of television transmissions required a licence, and radio-only licences ceased to be issued.

==== Colour television ====
The colour television licence (actually a "colour supplementary fee" of £5 on top of the existing monochrome licence) was introduced in 1968, following the commencement of BBC2 colour transmissions the previous July.

== Changing cost of the licence fee ==
Date	Radio only	Monochrome TV	Colour TV
November 1922	£0.5 (10s) [£25] (Note: Figures in square brackets are values inflation-adjusted to 2025 prices.)		
June 1946	£1 [£36]	£2 [£72]	
June 1954	£1 [£24]	£3 [£71]	
August 1957	£1 [£21]	£3 + £1 Excise Duty [£63 + £21]	
October 1963	£1 [£18]	£4 [£73]	
August 1965	£1.25 (£1 5s) [£21]	£5 [£85]	
January 1968	£1.25 (£1 5s) [£19]	£5 [£81]	£10 [£153]
January 1969	£1.25 (£1 5s) [£18]	£6 [£87]	£11 [£160]
July 1971		£7 [£88]	£12 [£152]
April 1975		£8 [£62]	£18 [£140]
July 1977		£9 [£53]	£21 [£123]
November 1978		£10 [£55]	£25 [£137]
November 1979		£12 [£59]	£34 [£167]
December 1981		£15 [£58]	£46 [£177]
March 1985		£18 [£56]	£58 [£180]
April 1988		£21 [£58]	£62.50 [£174]
April 1989		£22 [£58]	£66 [£175]
April 1990		£24 [£59]	£71 [£176]
April 1991		£25.50 [£52]	£77 [£177]
April 1992		£26.50 [£58]	£80 [£177]
April 1993		£27.50 [£59]	£83 [£179]
April 1994		£28 [£59]	£84.50 [£178]
April 1995		£28.50 [£59]	£86.50 [£178]
April 1996		£30 [£60]	£89.50 [£180]
April 1997		£30.50 [£60]	£91.50 [£180]
April 1998		£32.50 [£63]	£97.50 [£189]
April 1999		£33.50 [£64]	£101 [£193]
April 2000		£34.50 [£66]	£104 [£198]
April 2001		£36.50 [£69]	£109 [£205]
April 2002		£37.50 [£70]	£112 [£208]
April 2003		£38.50 [£70]	£116 [£212]
April 2004		£40.50 [£73]	£121 [£218]
April 2005		£42 [£74]	£126.50 [£224]
April 2006		£44 [£76]	£131.50 [£227]
April 2007		£45.50 [£77]	£135.50 [£229]
April 2008		£47 [£77]	£139.50 [£227]
April 2009		£48 [£77]	£142.50 [£227]
April 2010		£49 [£76]	£145.50 [£225]
April 2017		£49.50 [£66]	£147 [£196]
April 2018		£50.50 [£66]	£150.50 [£196]
April 2019		£52 [£67]	£154.50 [£198]
April 2020		£53 [£67]	£157.50 [£200]
April 2021		£53.50	£159
April 2024		£57	£169.50
April 2025		£58.50	£174.50
April 2026		£60.50	£180

Cost of a colour TV licence

Cost of a colour TV licence (inflation adjusted)

== Number of licences issued ==
The number of licences on issue at 31 March or 1 April by year is as follows:

=== 1927-1985 ===
Year	Total	Issued free to blind people	Radio only	Radio + B/W TV	Radio + colour TV	Over 75s	Concessionary
1927	2,269,644	5,750	2,263,894	N/A	N/A	N/A	N/A
1928	2,482,873	12,234	2,470,639	N/A	N/A	N/A	N/A
1929	2,731,872	14,505	2,717,367	N/A	N/A	N/A	N/A
1930	3,092,324	16,496	3,075,828	N/A	N/A	N/A	N/A
1931	3,647,722	21,304	3,626,418	N/A	N/A	N/A	N/A
1932	4,621,805	31,513	4,590,292	N/A	N/A	N/A	N/A
1933	5,497,217	35,850	5,461,367	N/A	N/A	N/A	N/A
1934	6,259,653	39,224	6,220,429	N/A	N/A	N/A	N/A
1935	7,011,753	41,868	6,969,885	N/A	N/A	N/A	N/A
1936	7,616,822	44,380	7,572,442	N/A	N/A	N/A	N/A
1937	8,127,636	46,475	8,081,161	N/A	N/A	N/A	N/A
1938	8,588,676	49,730	8,538,946	N/A	N/A	N/A	N/A
1939	8,968,338	52,621	8,915,717	N/A	N/A	N/A	N/A
1940	8,951,045	53,427	8,897,618	N/A	N/A	N/A	N/A
1941	8,752,454	50,555	8,701,899	N/A	N/A	N/A	N/A
1942	8,683,098	47,456	8,635,642	N/A	N/A	N/A	N/A
1943	9,242,040	48,399	9,193,641	N/A	N/A	N/A	N/A
1944	9,554,838	48,124	9,506,714	N/A	N/A	N/A	N/A
1945	9,710,230	46,861	9,663,369	N/A	N/A	N/A	N/A
1946	10,395,551	47,720	10,347,831	N/A	N/A	N/A	N/A
1947	10,777,704	49,846	10,713,298	14,560	N/A	N/A	N/A
1948	11,179,676	52,135	11,081,977	45,564	N/A	N/A	N/A
1949	11,747,448	53,654	11,567,227	126,567	N/A	N/A	N/A
1950	12,219,448	56,376	11,819,190	343,882	N/A	N/A	N/A
1951	12,369,027	58,161	11,546,925	763,941	N/A	N/A	N/A
1952	12,753,506	60,105	11,244,141	1,449,260	N/A	N/A	N/A
1953	12,892,231	61,095	10,688,684	2,142,452	N/A	N/A	N/A
1954	13,436,793	62,389	10,125,512	3,248,892	N/A	N/A	N/A
1955	13,980,496	62,506	9,414,224	4,503,766	N/A	N/A	N/A
1956	14,261,551	62,745	8,459,213	5,739,593	N/A	N/A	N/A
1957	14,525,099	62,453	7,496,390	6,966,256	N/A	N/A	N/A
1958	14,646,350	61,387	6,494,960	8,090,003	N/A	N/A	N/A
1959	14,736,413	57,784	5,423,207	9,255,422	N/A	N/A	N/A
1960	15,005,011	54,958	4,480,300	10,469,753	N/A	N/A	N/A
1961	15,176,725	50,852	3,858,132	11,267,741	N/A	N/A	N/A
1962	15,372,219	46,782	3,491,725	11,833,712	N/A	N/A	N/A
1963	15,698,991	43,371	3,212,814	12,442,806	N/A	N/A	N/A
1964	15,884,679	40,337	2,959,011	12,885,331	N/A	N/A	N/A
1965	16,046,603	34,355	2,759,203	13,253,045	N/A	N/A	N/A
1966	16,178,156	31,499	2,579,567	13,567,090	N/A	N/A	N/A
1967	16,773,205	29,662	2,476,272	14,267,271	N/A	N/A	N/A
1968	17,645,821	27,564	2,529,750	15,068,079	20,428	N/A	N/A
1969	17,959,933	24,966	2,438,906	15,396,642	99,419	N/A	N/A
1970	18,183,719	22,174	2,279,017	15,609,131	273,397	N/A	N/A
1971 (Note: Owing to industrial action within the Post Office the figures for licences in force (at these dates) do not reflect the true licensing position on those dates.) (Note: Radio-only and combined radio-and-television licences were abolished on 1 February 1971. From this date television-only licences have been issued.)	15,943,190	N/A	N/A	15,333,221	609,969	N/A	N/A
1972	16,658,451	N/A	N/A	15,023,691	1,634,760	N/A	N/A
1973	17,124,619	N/A	N/A	13,792,623	3,331,996	N/A	N/A
1974	17,324,570	N/A	N/A	11,766,424	5,558,146	N/A	N/A
1975	17,700,815	N/A	N/A	10,120,493	7,580,322	N/A	N/A
1976	17,787,984	N/A	N/A	9,148,732	8,639,252	N/A	N/A
1977	18,056,058	N/A	N/A	8,098,386	9,957,672	N/A	N/A
1978	18,148,918	N/A	N/A	7,099,726	11,049,192	N/A	N/A
1979	18,381,161	N/A	N/A	6,249,716	12,131,445	N/A	N/A
1980	18,284,865	N/A	N/A	5,383,125	12,901,740	N/A	N/A
1981	18,667,211	N/A	N/A	4,887,663	13,779,548	N/A	N/A
1982	18,554,220	N/A	N/A	4,293,668	14,260,552	N/A	N/A
1983	18,494,235	N/A	N/A	3,795,587	14,698,648	N/A	N/A
1984	18,631,753	N/A	N/A	3,261,272	15,370,481	N/A	N/A
1985	18,715,937	N/A	N/A	2,896,263	15,819,674	N/A	N/A
1986	18,704,732	N/A	N/A	2,679,396	16,025,336	N/A	N/A

=== 1997-present ===
Year	Total	Issued free to blind people	Radio only	Monochrome TV	Colour TV	Over 75s	Concessionary
1997	22,000,000	N/A	N/A	500,000	20,800,000	N/A	700,000
1998	22,300,000	N/A	N/A	400,000	21,300,000	N/A	600,000
1999	22,800,000	N/A	N/A	300,000	21,900,000	N/A	600,000
2000	23,300,000	N/A	N/A	200,000	22,400,000	N/A	700,000
2001	23,400,000	N/A	N/A	100,000	19,700,000	3,100,000	500,000
2002	23,800,000	N/A	N/A	100,000	19,900,000	3,600,000	200,000
2003	24,100,000	N/A	N/A	100,000	20,100,000	3,700,000	200,000
2004	24,500,000	N/A	N/A	100,000	20,400,000	3,800,000	200,000
2005	24,700,000	N/A	N/A	100,000	20,600,000	3,800,000	200,000
2006	25,000,000	N/A	N/A	100,000	20,800,000	3,900,000	200,000
2007	25,100,000	N/A	N/A	33,000	20,900,000	4,000,000	200,000
2008	25,248,000	N/A	N/A	28,000	21,081,000	3,953,000	186,000
2009	25,364,000	N/A	N/A	24,000	21,154,000	4,000,000	186,000
2010	25,459,000	N/A	N/A	19,000	21,171,000	4,088,000	181,000
2011	25,594,000	N/A	N/A	15,000	21,235,000	4,156,000	188,000
2012	25,706,000	N/A	N/A	12,000	21,306,000	4,206,000	182,000
2013	25,783,000	N/A	N/A	9,000	21,351,000	4,251,000	172,000
2014	25,879,000	N/A	N/A	8,000	21,367,000	4,328,000	176,000
2015	25,959,000	N/A	N/A	7,000	21,420,000	4,362,000	170,000
2016	25,997,000	N/A	N/A	7,000	21,441,000	4,363,000	186,000
2017	26,234,000	N/A	N/A	6,000	21,667,000	4,385,000	176,000
2018	26,239,000	N/A	N/A	6,000	21,611,000	4,455,000	167,000
2019	26,183,000	N/A	N/A	5,000	21,408,000	4,603,000	167,000
2020	25,946,000	N/A	N/A	5,000	21,128,000	4,669,999	144,000
2021	25,208,000	N/A	N/A	4,000	23,733,000	1,359,000	112,000
2022	24,906,000	N/A	N/A	4,000	23,760,000	1,034,000	188,000
2023	24,372,000	N/A	N/A	4,000	23,236,000	947,000	185,000
2024	23,888,000	N/A	N/A	4,000	22,731,000	964,000	189,000
2025	23,792,000	N/A	N/A	3,000	22,574,000	1,020,000	195,000
2026	23,253,000	N/A	N/A	3,000	22,026,000	1,025,000	199,000

== See also ==
- Television licence
- Television licensing in the United Kingdom

== Sources ==
- Figures for 1927–1955: The British Broadcasting Corporation Annual Report and Accounts for the Year 1954–55 (HMSO 1955)
- Figures for 1956–1986: BBC Annual Report and Handbook 1987 (BBC 1986)
- Rounded figure for 1997 & 1998 (at 31 March): BBC Annual Report and Accounts 1997/1998 (BBC 2000)
- Rounded figures for 1999 & 2000 (at 31 March): BBC Annual Report and Accounts 1999/2000 (BBC 2000)
- Rounded figures for 2001 & 2002 (at 31 March): BBC Annual Report and Accounts 2001/2002 (BBC 2002)
- Rounded figures for 2003 & 2004 (at 31 March): BBC Annual Report and Accounts 2003/2004 (BBC 2004)
- Rounded figures for 2005 & 2006 (at 31 March): BBC Annual Report and Accounts 2005/2006 (BBC 2006)
- Rounded figures for 2007: BBC Annual Report and Accounts 2006/2007 (BBC 2007)
- Rounded figures for 2008: BBC Annual Report and Accounts 2008/2009 (BBC 2009)
- Rounded figures for 2009: BBC Annual Report and Accounts 2009/2010 (BBC 2010)
- Rounded figures for 2010: BBC Annual Report and Accounts 2010/2011 (BBC 2011)
