= Katie Perrior =

British public relations specialist and columnist

Downing Street Director of Communications
- In office July 2016 – May 2017
- Prime Minister: Theresa May
- Preceded by: Craig Oliver
- Succeeded by: Robbie Gibb

Personal details
- Occupation: PR advisor • columnist

Katie Perrior is a British public relations specialist and columnist for The Times. She worked as a political advisor at 10 Downing Street under Theresa May and previously for Boris Johnson and David Davis.

== Life and career ==
Perrior is co-founder and Chair of Westminster-based lobbying and public relations firm iNHouse Communications. She previously served as a Conservative Campaign Headquarters staffer and advised Theresa May when she served as Party Chairman in the early 2000s. She later worked for David Davis during his time as Shadow Home Secretary and Boris Johnson's 2008 mayoral campaign.

In 2016, Perrior became Director of Communications at 10 Downing Street under Theresa May. She undertook the role following her appointment by May, and succeeded Craig Oliver who had worked as Communications Director under David Cameron.

Perrior said that 'trouser-gate' was "avoidable" had Theresa May's aide, Fiona Hill, not forced May to wear them for her interview in Number 10 for the Sunday Times.

Perrior resigned from her post on 18 April 2017 following the announcement of a snap general election, saying her office was "pretty dysfunctional". A number of months later The Guardian disclosed that Perrior had been paid £15,000 less than men for same role.

In August 2018, Total Politics reported Perrior criticising Boris Johnson's comments on the burka:

The Boris I know is liberal and respectful of all different communities. He loves the great melting point that is London and recognises what diverse cultures bring to our capital city. I regret he made these comments because I think they are divisive at a time when tensions are already high even though I am no fan of the burka.

Perior was a guest on The News Quiz on BBC Radio 4 in January and May 2019, and January 2022: she has also appeared on Politics Live and Good Morning Britain.

Perrior lives in Sidcup in the London Borough of Bexley, where she was a local Conservative Party Councillor in the early 2000s.

In 2022, Perrior appointed former Labour MP, Luciana Berger, as Managing Director at iNHouse Communications.

Government offices
Preceded by Craig Oliver	Downing Street Director of Communications; 2016–2017	Succeeded by Robbie Gibb
