= Deborah Turness =

British journalist (born 1967)

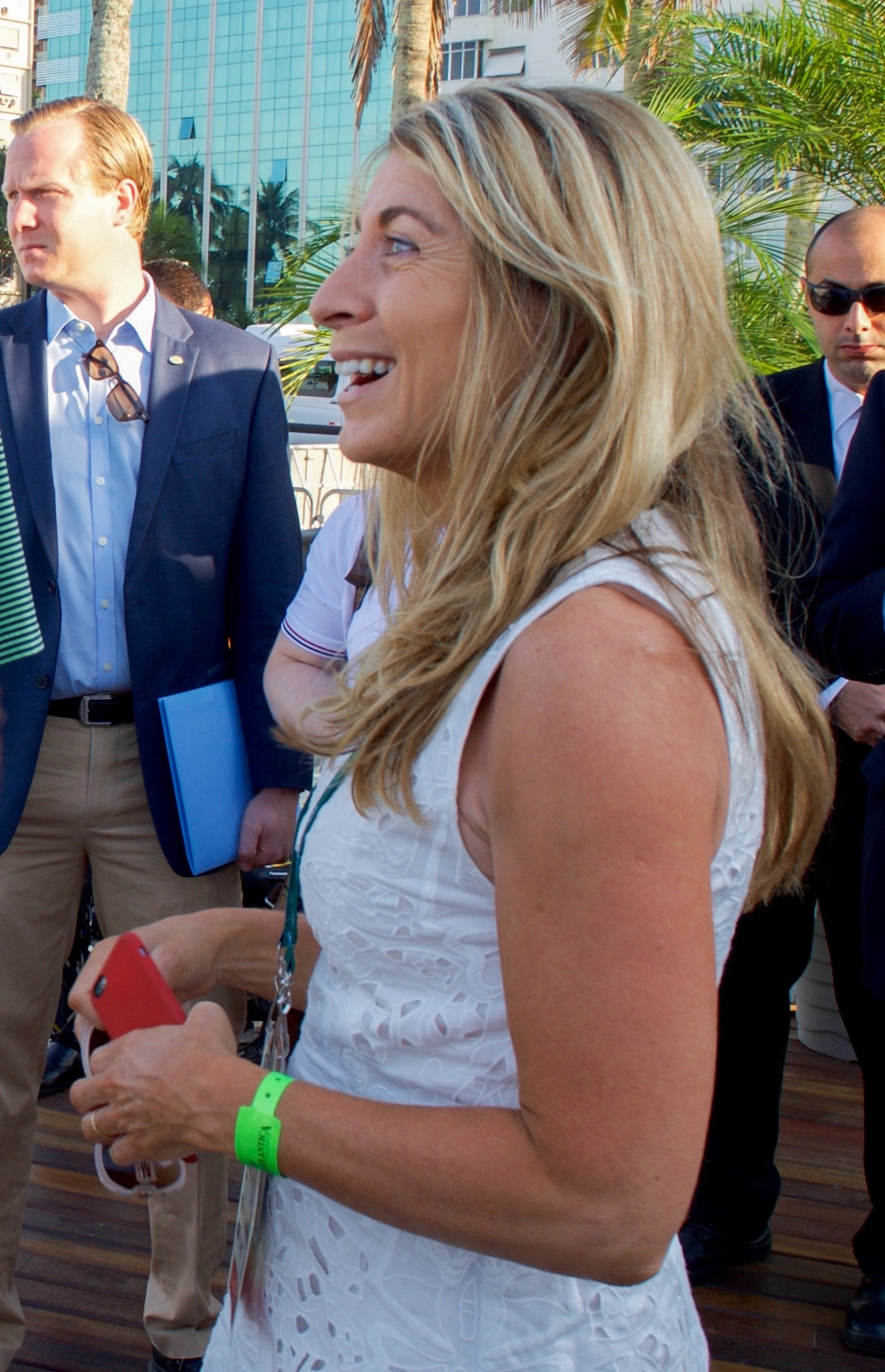
- Turness in 2016
- Born: Deborah Mary Turness; 4 March 1967 (age 59); Meriden, West Midlands, England
- Education: University of Bordeaux (PgDip); University of Surrey (BA)
- Occupations: Journalist, media executive
- Years active: 1988–present
- Organizations: BBC News; ITN (1988–2022)
- Title: CEO
- Spouse: John Toker
- Children: 2
- Awards: Amnesty International UK Media Award (2008); Women in Film and Television Awards (2008); The News and Factual Award

Deborah Mary Turness (born 4 March 1967) is a British journalist who has been CEO of BBC News since 2022 and of ITN until 2022. Prior to this she was president of NBC News (2013–2017) and then president of NBC News International. Before NBC, Turness was editor of ITV News (2004–2013), which made her the UK's first female editor of television news. On 9 November 2025, she announced she would leave the BBC amid allegations against the corporation of editorial bias.

== Early life and education ==
Born in Meriden, Solihull, England, Turness was educated at St Francis' College (aged twelve, expelled by the Sisters for kissing a boy behind a bush); then The Knights Templar School in Baldock, Hertfordshire. Turness took a BA in French and English from the University of Surrey; then a postgraduate diploma in journalism from the University of Bordeaux, France.

== Career ==
=== ITN and Channel 4 career ===
Turness joined ITN in 1988 as a freelance producer in the Paris Bureau straight from university. She became ITN's North of England producer in 1991. In 1993, she joined the ITN Bureau in Washington as a producer.

In 2000, Turness was Deputy Editor of 5 News before being promoted to Editor in 2002. At Five News she famously did away with desks in the studio, thereby introducing the concept of "perching presenters". During 2002, she worked on Channel 4's RI:SE as Producer before quitting after six months to rejoin ITV News as Deputy Editor. In 2004, she became the Editor of ITV News, being the first woman to become the head of network news. ITV News won three consecutive Baftas and an International Emmy during her tenure. Her deputy at the time was Jonathan Munro, with whom she subsequently worked at the BBC. In 2008, Turness won "The News and Factual Award" presented by Women in Television and Film. Also in 2008, she was the co-winner of an Amnesty International UK Media Awards for the television news report "Too Young to Die – Children of the Frontline". In 2010, she chaired the MediaGuardian Edinburgh International Television Festival.

As Editor of ITN, Turness presided over a series of scoops and world exclusives including the arrest of the London bomber and the leaked investigation report on the Killing of Jean Charles de Menezes. In May 2011, she was the only journalist invited to the Buckingham Palace State Banquet for Barack Obama.

=== NBC career ===
In 2013, she was appointed president of NBC News and remained in the role until February 2017. Under her leadership the news division had gains in ratings for Meet the Press and the Nightly News shows, but she appointed Jamie Horowitz to run Today, who only lasted ten weeks in the role. In response to the Brian Williams controversy over his misleading statements, Turness was criticised heavily. Vanity Fair reported that several NBC News executives were displeased at her work and felt she was not qualified to do the job.

In February 2017, Noah Oppenheim took over as president of NBC News and Turness was appointed president of a new division called NBC News International that was NBC's side in a partnership with Euronews, in which each network would contribute reporting to the other. She moved back to the UK.

In April 2021, Turness left her role at NBC and returned to ITN as chief executive officer.

=== BBC career ===
In January 2022, Turness was appointed CEO of BBC News. Turness was prevented from taking up the post immediately as her employer, ITN, denied her early release from her notice period. The then director-general of the BBC, Tim Davie, said that the then Deputy Director of News, Jonathan Munro, would hold the post "until Deborah Turness joins us later this year". She joined the BBC Board in September 2022 for a two-year term, with Munro as her deputy.

In 2023, Turness launched the BBC's Verify fact-checking unit. Later that year, a former BBC News chief publicly expressed anxieties about Verify.

In November 2025, Turness resigned from her job at the BBC, alongside director general Tim Davie. Their resignations followed an accusation of bias concerning a number of issues, including the editing of a speech by Donald Trump in a BBC News Panorama progamme aired on 28 October 2024, days before the US presidential election. The Daily Telegraph reported her as describing the Reform Party as "an extreme conservative movement, very anti-immigration......" and that it had been BBC editorial policy not to give Nigel Farage prime-time exposure in the last General Election. She dismissed the open-bias scandal of the editing of what Donald Trump had actually said as "a problem with the edit".

== Personal life ==
Turness lived in Shepherd's Bush, London, with her first husband, the television journalist Damien Steward. In 1991, she competed in the Paris to Peking Off-road 4x4 Car Rally.

On 26 August 2011, she married John Toker, the former Director of Communications for Security and Intelligence at the Cabinet Office and an ITN producer.

The couple have two children.
