= Hartshill Park =

Nature reserve in Stoke-on-Trent, England

Coordinates: 53.0103°N 2.1983°W

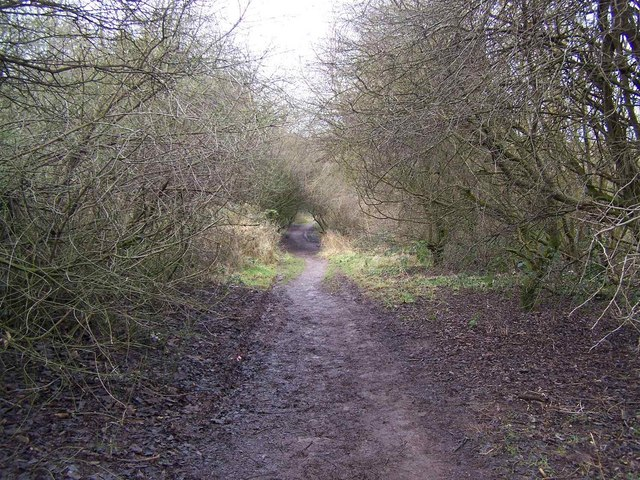

Hartshill Park is a large nature reserve stretching along the western edge of the city of Stoke-on-Trent, England. The park is a patchwork of different habitats, including five ponds. It is notable for being part of a Norman deer hunting park that has survived as open space into the modern era. It is a local nature reserve.

== History ==
The place takes its name from Hart, meaning "deer". The Roman road called Rykeneld Street may have passed directly along the top of the ridge and gone down to where Stoke-on-Trent railway station is now, although the exact route it ran along from Wolstanton is unknown. However, local historians suspect that the road actually dropped into the valley at Basford and came into Stoke via Etruria There are various military and topographical reasons why an Etruria route is far more likely.

Hartshill Park was part of a Norman deer hunting park, which survived as such well into the 15th century – evidenced by records of the boundaries being repaired at that time. The lower Cliffe Vale flatter section of the park – in the valley between Shelton Old Road and Eturia Road (now occupied by the A500 and the West Coast Main Line railway line) was likely to have been deforested sometime in the 15th century. The more elevated core of the hunting park became a landed estate and farm, and it is marked on 1st edition six-inch (152 mm) Ordnance Survey map (c. 1860) as "Cliff Ville" – this was a gentleman's residence with extensive grounds that later became Saint Dominic's High School.

In the early 20th Century some of the accessible parts of the area were used for dumping pottery and brick-making waste. The bulk of the land in the park was farmed from 1916 to 1978, for grazing and dairy. Stoke-on-Trent City Council compulsorily purchased the land in 1975. Parts of the park were lost to two new state schools and their extensive playing fields, in the 1960s and 1970s (one of these schools has since closed and been redeveloped for housing). The rest of the land underwent basic reclamation from the late 1970s onwards, to serve as public open space, but it then had very little maintenance or attention from the city council for the next thirty years.

== The Convent and Convent Pools ==
The southern tip of the park became the grounds of a Catholic convent and associated school in the early 1920s. The nuns used the pools for nature sketching, and built a large grotto (still standing) to hold a statue of Our Lady. The convent is now the site of an old people's home. The pools at the far southern end of the contemporary park are called the "Convent Pools", and as of 2012 are being repaired and restocked with the aid of various grants.

== Friends of Hartshill Park group ==
In 1999 the Friends of Hartshill Park group was formed. The friends have accessed small grants to repair paths, create new habitats, and plant trees.
