= Robbie Gibb =

British political advisor (born 1964)

Sir Robbie Gibb

Downing Street Director of Communications
- In office 6 July 2017 – 24 July 2019
- Prime Minister: Theresa May
- Preceded by: Katie Perrior
- Succeeded by: Lee Cain

Personal details
- Born: Robert Paul Gibb; 29 September 1964 (age 62) Northampton, Northamptonshire, England
- Spouse: Elizabeth Louise Boyd
- Children: 2
- Relatives: Sir Nick Gibb (brother)
- Education: Royal Holloway, University of London
- Occupation: Public relations professional; political advisor; broadcast journalist

Sir Robert Paul Gibb (born 29 September 1964) is a British public relations professional and former political advisor and broadcast journalist.

He is the brother of Sir Nick Gibb, the former Conservative Member of Parliament (MP) for Bognor Regis and Littlehampton. After graduating from Royal Holloway, University of London, he pursued a career as a journalist with his first role as a political researcher at the BBC. He then became chief of staff for Conservative MP Francis Maude in the late 1990s. Gibb returned to the BBC in 2002 as the deputy political editor of Newsnight and went on to edit various television programmes including Daily Politics, The Andrew Marr Show, and This Week.

Gibb was Prime Minister Theresa May's Downing Street Director of Communications between 2017 and 2019. Gibb then became a senior advisor for the public relations consultancy Kekst CNC. He joined the BBC Board as a non-executive director in 2021.

== Early life and education ==
Robbie Gibb was born in Northampton on 29 September 1964 to John and Eileen Gibb. He grew up in the West Yorkshire cities of Leeds and Wakefield.

Gibb was educated at Ramsey Abbey School in Cambridgeshire and Harrogate Grammar School in North Yorkshire. He studied Economics and Public Administration at Royal Holloway, University of London.

In his youth, Gibb and his brother Nick were recruited and trained by the National Alliance of Russian Solidarists, a right-wing Russian anticommunist organisation. They pretended to be tourists in Russian cities in order to smuggle letters to and from dissidents.

== Career ==
After graduation, Gibb joined the BBC as a political researcher including for the television programme On the Record. He left this role soon after his brother Nick was elected as Conservative MP for Bognor Regis and Littlehampton, to become Conservative MP and shadow chancellor Francis Maude's chief of staff. Gibb served in this role until 2000. He then joined Maude in supporting Michael Portillo's campaign to become leader in the 2001 Conservative Party leadership election.

He returned to the BBC in 2002 as deputy editor of the news and current affairs television programme Newsnight. Gibb left this role to become the organisation's political editor for Daily Politics, The Andrew Marr Show, and This Week as well as coverage of the Budget. He was also editor of live political events including The Great Debate during the 2016 EU referendum campaign. Gibb is a prominent supporter of Brexit.

In 2017, Gibb returned to politics, becoming Conservative Prime Minister Theresa May's Downing Street Director of Communications. He was succeeded by Lee Cain after Boris Johnson became prime minister in 2019.

He was appointed a Knight Bachelor in May's resignation honours on 10 September 2019 for political and public service. Gibb then became a senior advisor for global strategic communications consultancy Kekst CNC, which is part of the French public relations firm Publicis Groupe.

In 2020, he led a successful consortium bid to buy The Jewish Chronicle. The bid was backed by journalist Sir William Shawcross, former Labour MP John Woodcock, and journalist John Ware. Gibb has refused to say who funded the bid, believed to be around £3.5 million. In his declaration of interest on the BBC website, Gibb stated that he owned a 100 per cent holding in Jewish Chronicle Media. Alan Rusbridger, in The Independent, wrote that, "the BBC board's own website commits them to 'submit themselves to whatever scrutiny is appropriate to their office'. They should restrict information 'only when the wider public interest clearly demands'." Rusbridger continued by saying that Gibb had "flatly ignored my questions about his role as the sole named director of the JC. Nor will he tell anyone whose money is behind the paper he 'owns'".

According to former Chronicle journalist Lee Harpin, Gibb made a habit of coming into the office and checking what stories were topping the news list; Harpin was told the new owners wanted more views "well to the right of the Tory party". Harpin stated that Gibb interviewed candidates for a senior editor position and appointed Jake Wallis Simons.

Gibb resigned as a director of the Chronicle on 20 August 2024, passing ownership to Jonathan Kandel, a fellow consortium member, and the ex-Labour peer Lord Austin of Dudley. The people ultimately responsible for the company's debts remained unknown. Gibb retained sole directorship of "The JC Media and Culture Preservation Initiative", a community interest company sharing a correspondence address with The Jewish Chronicle.

Gibb described himself as a "Thatcherite Conservative". He was an editorial advisor for GB News prior to its launch in 2021. Gibb also advised the government in 2021 on the publication of the Commission on Race and Ethnic Disparities report.

Gibb joined the BBC Board in May 2021 as the Member for England for a three-year term. His appointment was supported by Conservative Party political advisor Dougie Smith, who according to journalist Tim Shipman, "pressed for months" for him to become part of the Board. Smith and Gibb are close friends since their time as members of the Federation of Conservative Students. According to the journalist Oliver Shah he is a "right-of-centre voice" on the board.

According to the Financial Times, he attempted to block Jess Brammar's appointment as BBC executive news editor in July 2021 by sending a text message to Director, News & Current Affairs Fran Unsworth urging her not to make this appointment as it would shatter the government's "fragile trust in the BBC". A source close to Gibb denied that he sent the message. Deputy Labour Party Leader Angela Rayner called for his resignation, saying it was "Tory cronyism at the heart of the BBC". In August 2022, former BBC presenter Emily Maitlis stated that Gibb was an "active agent of the Conservative party" who played a significant role in determining the nature of the corporation's news output.

In March 2024, Gibb's membership on the BBC Board was renewed for a four-year term to May 2028.

In September 2024, after The Jewish Chronicle apologised for publishing a string of fabricated stories about the Gaza war, Alan Rusbridger queried how Gibb could, as a member of the BBC's editorial guidelines and standard committee, sit on a panel and participate in an upcoming review of the impartiality of the BBC's war coverage.

In July 2025, Gibb's impartiality was again questioned in an open letter from over 400 media figures to the BBC, which stated: "we are concerned that an individual with close ties to the Jewish Chronicle … has a say in the BBC's editorial decisions in any capacity, including the decision not to broadcast Gaza: Medics Under Fire".

In November 2025, Liberal Democrats leader Ed Davey called for Gibb's removal from the BBC board because of Gibb's alleged role in the 2025 BBC editorial bias controversy. One of the main BBC staff unions, Bectu, has also called for Gibbs' removal from the Board.

Later in November 2025 it was reported by the BBC itself, that Gibb had claimed before the parliamentary Culture, Media and Sport committee, to have been completely impartial ever since 1991. According to the BBC, Gibb said to MPs "I have impartiality through my bones", and that it was "drummed into him" when he joined the BBC in 1991.

== Personal life ==
Gibb married Elizabeth Louise Boyd in 1994; the couple have two daughters. He is the Westminster Chair of Leeds United Supporters Club. Gibb lists golf and boating as his recreations in Who's Who.

Government offices
Preceded by Katie Perrior	Downing Street Director of Communications; 2017–2019	Succeeded by Lee Cain
