= Nick Seddon =

British political policy adviser, businessman, and author

Nick Seddon MBE (born 1978) is a British political policy adviser, businessman, and author. He served as a senior special adviser to Prime Minister David Cameron from May 2013 to 2016. Seddon was educated at Magdalene College, Cambridge. He is a visiting professor at the Imperial College London Institute of Global Health Innovation.

== Career ==
Since 2016 he has been an executive at Optum, United Health Group. Seddon is CEO of Optum Genomics, having previously led product strategy and portfolio management for Optum.

Before joining Optum, Seddon served as Senior Special Adviser for Health and Life Sciences to Prime Minister David Cameron from May 2013 to 2016. In this capacity, he played an instrumental role in developing and implementing policies to ensure the long-term sustainability of the NHS. His focus areas included mental health, cancer, childhood obesity, and the 100,000 genome program. During the UK's G8 presidency, he worked with the PM and other international stakeholders to bring the fight against dementia to the forefront of the global policy agenda. He was said by the Health Service Journal to be the ninth most powerful person in the English NHS in December 2013.

Seddon was formerly deputy director of the pro-market think tank Reform and has served as head of communications for Circle, then the UK's fastest growing healthcare company. Seddon has authored many articles in national newspapers and journals, and has appeared frequently on television and radio.

He was educated at King Edward VI Camp Hill School in Birmingham and Magdalene College, Cambridge, where he read English and earned a first-class degree.

== Publications ==
- 2000 Figures of Speech: An Anthology of Magdalene Writers with MEJ Hughes and John Mole (Magdalene College, University of Cambridge)
- 2007 Who Cares? How State Funding and Political Activism Change Charity (Civitas)
