= Joanna Kuenssberg =

British diplomat

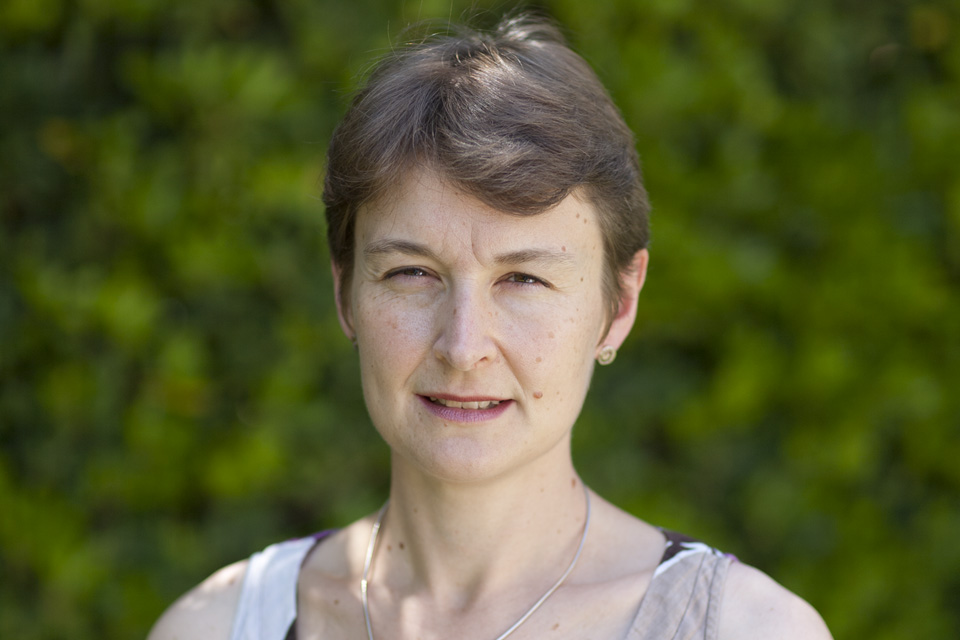
- Kuenssberg in 2013

British High Commissioner to Mozambique
- In office 2014 – 2018
- Preceded by: Shaun Cleary
- Succeeded by: NneNne Iwuji-Eme

Personal details
- Born: Joanna Kate Kuenssberg; 1973 (age 52–53) Lima, Peru
- Children: 3
- Relatives: Laura Kuenssberg (sister); Ekkehard von Kuenssberg (paternal grandfather); Lord Robertson (maternal grandfather); Sir James Wilson Robertson (great-uncle)
- Education: New College, Oxford (B.A.)

Joanna Kate Kuenssberg (born 1973) is a British oil executive and former diplomat who was the United Kingdom's high commissioner to Mozambique from 2014 to 2018.

== Early life and education ==
Kuenssberg was born in Lima, Peru, a daughter of Nick Kuenssberg, a Scottish businessman who was working in Lima at the time, and his wife Sally Robertson. Her younger sister is Laura Kuenssberg, and they have a brother David who is executive director of finance and resources at Brighton and Hove City Council. She attended Laurel Bank School in Glasgow. She was educated at New College, Oxford, where she gained a BA degree in modern languages in 1995.

== Career ==
She joined the Department of the Environment in 1995 and worked at the European Commission as project manager (EU enlargement) 1996–97, after which she joined the Foreign and Commonwealth Office (FCO). She was seconded to the Hungarian Ministry of Foreign Affairs 1999–2000 and to the Quai d’Orsay EU Directorate 2000–01, followed by a post at the British embassy in Paris 2001–04. She was deputy head of mission at Lisbon, Portugal, 2010–14 and chargé d'affaires there from January to May 2011. From April 2014 she was High Commissioner to Mozambique, based in Maputo. She was replaced in July 2018.

A month after leaving the Foreign Office she began working for the oil company Shell as vice president of government relations with Russia. After three years she was promoted to vice president of corporate relations with Middle Eastern, North African, and Central Eurasian states.

== Personal life ==
Kuenssberg married in 1997 and has three sons.

=== Ancestry ===
The family of von Künßberg (which can also be spelt Kuenssberg) is an old German family, with roots back to the mid-12th century (mentioned as early as 1149 in several sources). She is the granddaughter of Ekkehard von Kuenssberg (1913–2000), a German-born physician who emigrated to Scotland, and her great-grandfather was Professor Dr. Eberhard Georg Otto Freiherr von Künßberg (1881–1941), of the Thurnau line of the family: a separate and distinct line from that of Eberhard Freiherr von Kuensberg, the leader of the Sonderkommando assigned to transport Russian artifacts for the German Foreign Office during the Second World War. Eberhard von Künßberg married the Protestant-raised Dr. Katharina Samson, the daughter of wealthy cloth manufacturer Gustav Samson, and Anna Goldschmidt, the fourth daughter of Hermann and Rosalie Goldschmidt.

Professor Dr. Eberhard von Künßberg was a scholar in the history of German law, a professor at the University of Heidelberg, a legal linguist and a pioneer in the field of legal geography. From the death of Richard Schroeder in 1917 until von Künßberg's own death in 1941, he edited the Deutsches Rechtswörterbuch.

Her maternal line includes her great-uncle James Wilson Robertson, the last British governor-general of Nigeria; and Lord Robertson, her maternal grandfather.

Diplomatic posts
Preceded by Shaun Cleary	British High Commissioner to Mozambique; 2014–2018	Succeeded by NneNne Iwuji-Eme
