= Thomas Munro (disambiguation) =

Sir Thomas Munro, 1st Baronet (1761–1827) was a Scottish soldier and colonial administrator.

Thomas Munro may also refer to:

- Thomas Munro (solicitor) (1866–1923), Scottish solicitor, county council clerk and public servant
- Thomas Munro (art historian) (1897–1974), American philosopher of art and professor of art history
- Thomas Arthur Munro (1905–1966), Scottish physician and psychologist

== See also ==
- Thomas Monroe (disambiguation)
