= Chris Mason (journalist) =

British journalist (born 1980)

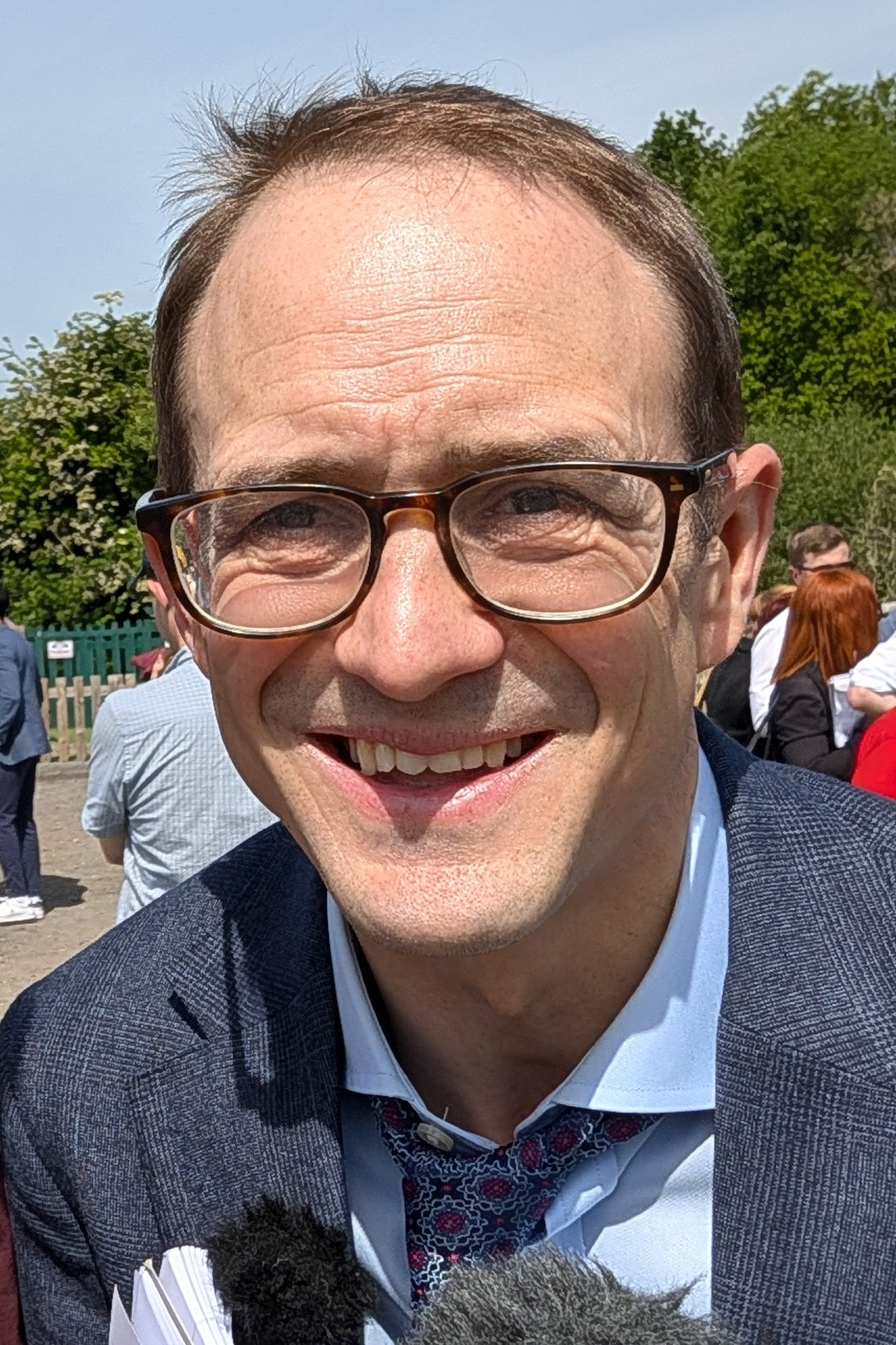
- Mason in 2026
- Born: Christopher Richard Mason; 21 April 1980 (age 46); Steeton, West Yorkshire, England
- Education: Ermysted's Grammar School
- Alma mater: Christ's College, Cambridge; City, University of London
- Years active: 2001–present
- Employer: BBC
- Notable work: Newscast; Any Questions?
- Title: Political Editor of BBC News (2022–present)
- Spouse: Polly Mason
- Children: 2

Christopher Richard Mason (born 21 April 1980) is an English journalist who has been the political editor of BBC News since 2022, having been the corporation's political correspondent. He filled the vacant political editor position previously held by Laura Kuenssberg. He is also a presenter of the podcast and television programme Newscast (formerly Brexitcast).

== Early life and career ==
Christopher Richard Mason was born on 21 April 1980 in Airedale Hospital in Steeton, Bradford, West Yorkshire. His parents were primary school teachers. He grew up in Grassington, North Yorkshire, and attended Ermysted's Grammar School in Skipton. He listened to radio, in particular BBC Radio Lancashire, from an early age and his childhood ambition was to present his own programme. He was an undergraduate at Christ's College, Cambridge, where he studied Geography, and participated in student newspapers, student radio and student television. Mason started his career as a trainee in broadcast journalism at ITN in autumn 2001. He gained a postgraduate diploma from City, University of London, where he trained as a journalist.

== Career ==
In 2002, Mason moved to BBC Newcastle, where he befriended future broadcaster Rob Young, and then to the BBC regional desk at Westminster. His first report from Westminster was in 2004. For two years, Mason reported for BBC News as a Europe correspondent, followed by a short stint as a political reporter on BBC Radio 5 Live. He then became a political correspondent for BBC News in 2012.

The Yorkshire Post has described Mason's broadcasting style as relatively "informal", and said that that has attracted attention in his television appearances as an occasional host of BBC Breakfast and a political correspondent. In February 2016, Mason broadcast from outside 10 Downing Street as he unsuccessfully attempted to engage ministers arriving for the cabinet meeting called to discuss David Cameron's renegotiation of the UK's European Union membership. Whilst live on BBC Breakfast in November 2018, he asked "So where are we in all of this Brexit process? To be quite honest, looking at things right now, I haven't got the foggiest idea what is going to happen in the coming weeks. Is the Prime Minister going to get a deal with the EU? Dunno! Is she going to be able to get it through the Commons? Don't know about that, either. I think you might as well get Mr Blobby back on to offer his analysis, because, frankly, I suspect his is now as good as mine." Mason was praised for his honesty after his comments were shared on social media and translated into French in newspaper Le Parisien.

In December 2018 he unveiled a blue plaque honouring the Yorkshire-born journalist W. R. Mitchell (1928–2015). A study of "the Twitter output of 10 seasoned UK political correspondents" found, that Mason was a "prolific" tweeter, and had 66,000 followers between month 1 September and 3 October 2018. Mason tweeted about a "diverse and humorous range of interests beyond the political scene", including his native Yorkshire and goldfish named after other journalists.

=== Brexitcast and radio ===
In June 2017, he began presenting the podcast Brexitcast (which has become Newscast) with Adam Fleming and was later joined by Laura Kuenssberg and Katya Adler. The podcast covered the United Kingdom's withdrawal from the European Union from Brussels and London. From September 2019 to January 2020, Brexitcast was also broadcast on BBC One television. He has presented two BBC Radio 4 documentaries called Could the PM Have a Brummie Accent? and The Country vs the City, in July 2018 and March 2019.

On 9 October 2019, Mason was appointed chair of the BBC Radio 4 debate programme Any Questions? He said it was "daunting" to take over from Jonathan Dimbleby, who had been chair for 32 years. Mason suggested his Yorkshire accent helped him get the job and pointed at a lack of a broad range of regional accents more generally in British broadcasting. His first show was broadcast from the University of Reading on 18 October with guests Siân Berry, Madeline Grant, David Lammy and Brandon Lewis. Despite reports that Mason might join the new digital station Times Radio before its 2020 launch, he remained at the BBC.

=== BBC political editor ===
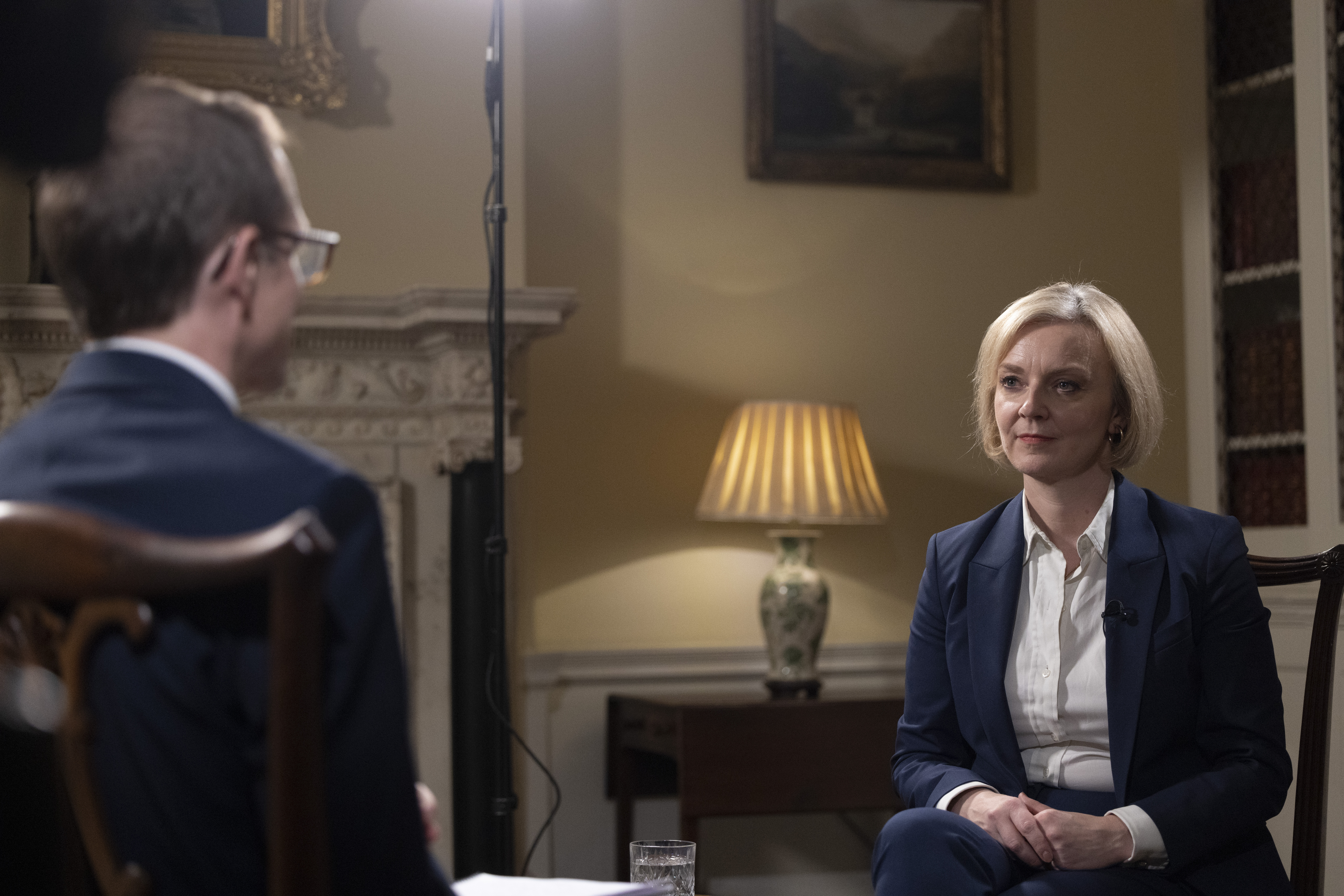
Mason interviewing Liz Truss during her government's political crisis, which saw her resign after seven weeks in office

Following Laura Kuenssberg's announcement of her departure as political editor of BBC News, Mason publicly said he did not want the job, with The Sunday Times reporting he wanted to concentrate on his Any Questions? role and on writing a book. According to the same newspaper, he was later persuaded to apply for the job by BBC bosses after he was courted by rival broadcasters. On 13 April 2022, it was announced that Mason would become the new political editor of BBC News and would begin in the role in May, replacing Kuenssberg.

== Personal life ==
Mason is married to a primary school teacher. The couple have two children and live in Charlton, south-east London. Mason took parental leave between July and September 2019, following the birth of his second child.

Media offices
Preceded by Laura Kuenssberg	Political Editor: BBC News; 2022–present	Incumbent
