= Deutsches Rechtswörterbuch =

Dictionary of German legal terminology from the Middle Ages to the 19th century

The Deutsches Rechtswörterbuch (DRW) or Dictionary of Historical German Legal Terms is a historic legal dictionary developed under the aegis of the Heidelberg Academy of Sciences and Humanities. The research unit took up work in 1897 and until today has completed 104,043 articles, ranging from Aachenfahrt (pilgrimage to Aachen) to übergehen (pass over/ignore). These have been published in 12 consecutive volumes and are also freely accessible online. In course of its research, the DRW also touches upon sources in Old English, of Hanseatic provenance and Pennsylvania German. The research unit will presumably conclude its work in 2036.

== Objectives ==
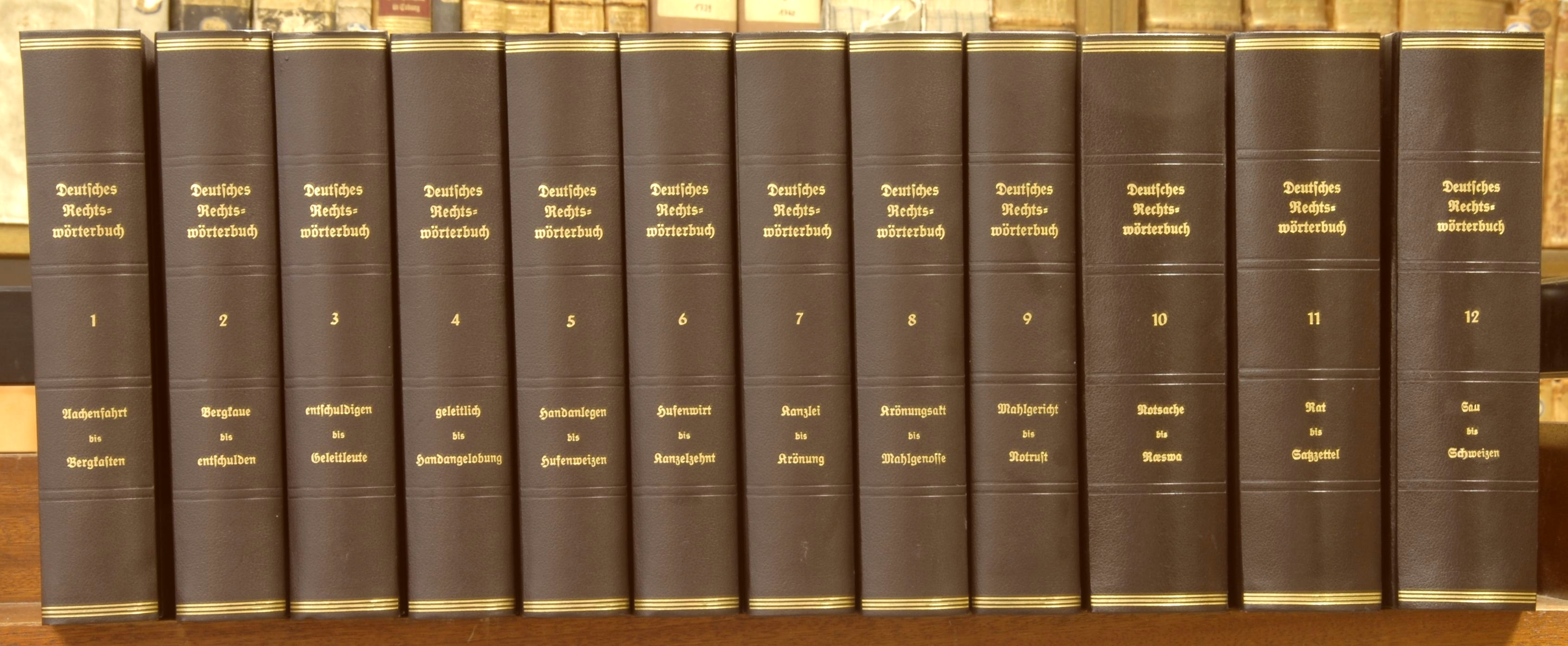
So far published 12 volumes of the Dictionary of Historical German Legal Terms

The DRW aims at covering German legal terminology from the Middle Ages up to the beginning of the 19th century. In this context, legal language is understood as a general historical vocabulary in reference to legal meanings. The research unit wants to outline how legal concepts, convictions and institutions manifested themselves in everyday language. Concomitantly, the DRW does not only contain legal terms, but common phrases bearing relation to legal contexts. Furthermore, the DRW as part of its research lists the legally relevant vocabulary, not only of Modern High German, but of all Western German language varieties. The dictionary cites usage of historical vocabulary from various regions of the West Germanic language area from England to Transylvania, and from Lorraine to the Baltic Sea. In order to capture the full lexical diversity of meanings for each word, the dictionary employs techniques of synchronic and diachronic comparative law in addition to purely linguistic and lexicographic approaches, against the backdrop of historical contextualization.

As Germany’s Federal President Richard von Weizsäcker once wrote:

“The Rechtswörterbuch incorporates language- and culture-historical references beyond purely legal understandings, thus making the work truly cross-disciplinary.”

== History ==
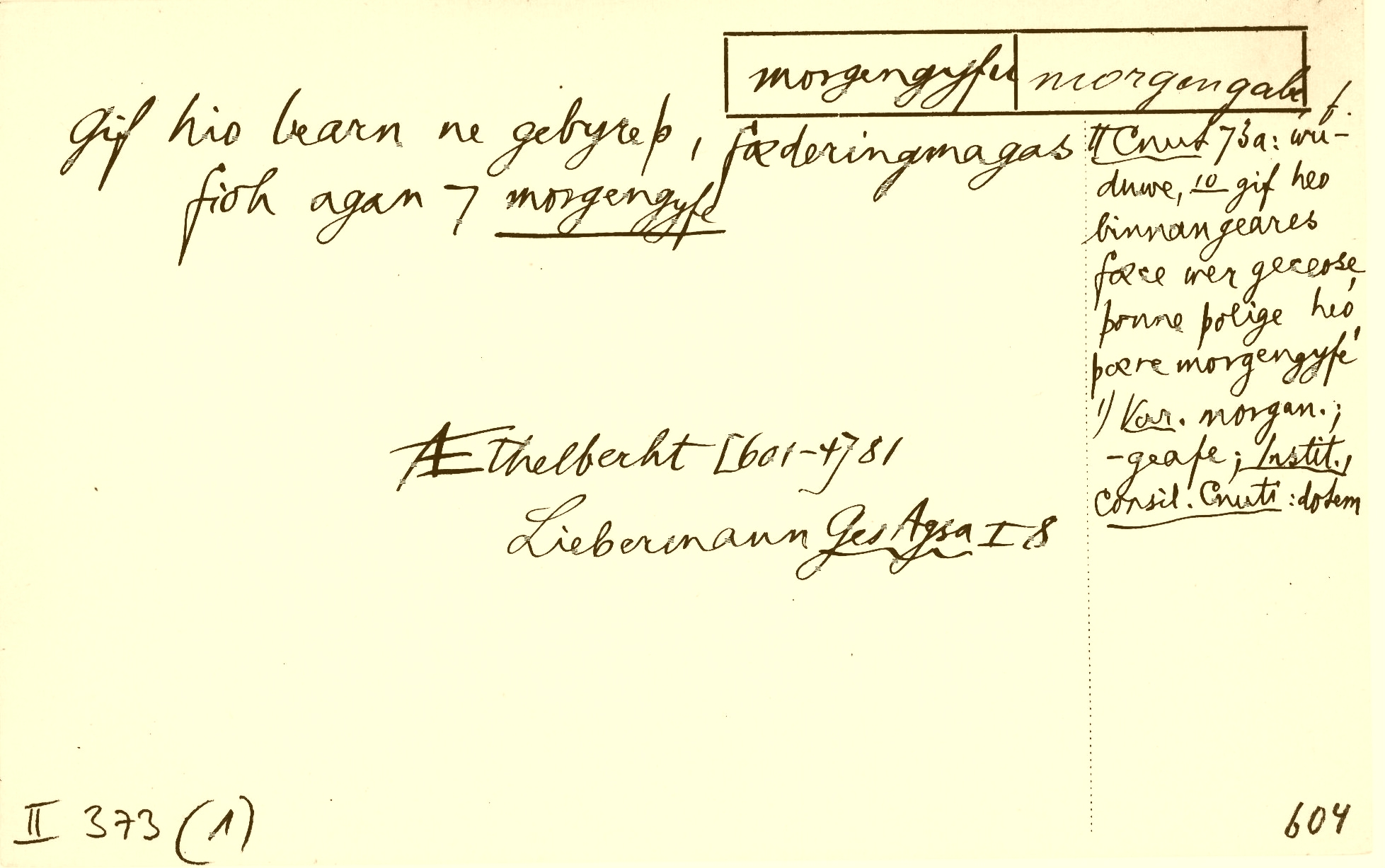
In the early years of the research unit's work, such paper slides were created to register references from the historical sources. This paper slide from the archive gives reference to "Morgengabe".

The DRW was initiated in 1896/97 as a project of the Royal Prussian Academy of Science at about the same time as other fundamental dictionary projects like the Schweizerisches Idiotikon. Perhaps, the envisioned Dictionary on Anglo-Norman Legal Terms by the Selden Society served as an inspiration (the renamed Dictionary of Law French compiled by Elsie Shanks sadly has never been published). Leading German capacities in the field of legal history, history and language history like Heinrich Brunner, Ernst Dümmler and Karl Weinhold belonged to the founding commission. Otto von Gierke was also a founding member and being rooted in the tradition of the German Historical School pledged for the inclusion of the West Germanic languages. Since the first head of research unit, Prof. Dr. iur. Richard Schröder, held office in Heidelberg, the DRW has been located from the start in the historic city on the river Neckar. Schröder’s successor was Prof. Eberhard Freiherr von Künßberg. Since he was married to a Jewish woman, the family had to emigrate to the United States (see descendants Ekkehard von Kuenssberg and Laura Kuenssberg). These circumstances contributed to the inner and outer turmoil the research unit faced in the wake of Nazi rule and World War II. Arising from the division of Germany and the dissolution of the Prussian Academy (hence called German Academy of Sciences at Berlin), the DRW was incorporated into the Heidelberg Academy in 1959. Forty years later, the late head of research unit Dr. Heino Speer, initialised the free of charge Internet publication.

== Modus operandi and sources ==
Every article deals with a certain word, which has been lemmatised into a standard German form. It contains linguistic information, explanations regarding the word’s acceptation(s) and the specific legal context. All meanings and compounds are illustrated by means of historical evidence cited in original language and excerpted from the DRW’s selection of sources. As main sources the DRW used various titles, from which more than two million quotations have been extracted in the research units’ early years. The excerpts were written on paper slides and are retrieved from the paper slide archive to the present day, as the basis of the research work. Owing to clarity, the DRW provides the used titles with scribal abbreviations. The catalogue of these so called Siglen amount to over 8000 titles in total and consist of:

- over 4300 Monographs
- over 1900 multipart items and series
- over 900 journals
- over 1000 non-independent works

The sources used date back from 500 AD to 1835 AD and cover the following languages:

- vernacular words from early Latin texts (500–800)
- Old English (600–1100)
- Old High German (600–1050)
- Lombardic (650–1000)
- Old Dutch (700–1200)
- Old Saxon (800–1200)
- Old Frisian (800–1500)
- Middle High German (1050–1350)
- Middle Dutch (1200–1500/1600)
- Middle Low German (1200–1650)
- Early Modern High German (1350–1650)
- Modern High German (1650–1835)

The dictionary's oldest evidence dates back to 479 AD and was excerpted from a Merovingian Charter at the time of Clovis I. The word at issue is "mundburt" (meaning a lord's special protection rights) for which Felix Liebermann's Die Gesetze der Angelsachsen ("mundbyrd", 685/86) provides evidence. Old English texts thus amount to a major part of the oldest sources cited in the DRW.

The DRW has made arrangements, which have to be met, in order for compounds and simplexes to be featured in the articles. Compounds should not exceed the turn of the 18th century. In order for a simplex to be included in the dictionary, the word's first verifiable evidence must date from 1815, at the latest. Terms originating from the designated timeframe of 1815 to 1835 will not be printed, but published with short reference in the online version.

== English sources ==
In particular, Liebermann’s aforementioned Die Gesetze der Angelsachsen (The Anglo-Saxons‘ Law) serve as an important source for the DRW with regard to Old English. Die Gesetze der Angelsachsen contains the laws proclaimed by Anglo-Saxon rulers over the course of 5 centuries and remains “authoritative” and “unsurpassed” in the field. When it comes to Old English, cross-references are at times given to the seminal Anglo-Saxon Dictionary by Bosworth and Toller.

In addition, many legal documents concerning the Hanseatic League and their Stahlhof (Steelyard) in London might bear special interest for the English user.

Following migration to North America in the 17th and 18th centuries, German settlers from the Rhine Franconian language region preserved their dialects nowadays known as Pennsylvania Dutch. Pennsylvania German words, thus also find their way into the DRW, e.g. freiheitsbâm > Freiheitsbaum (tree of freedom) according to Lambert’s Dictionary of the non-English words of the Pennsylvania-German dialect meaning black poplar.

== Info video ==
Information video on the research project: Brief profile | Introducing the German Legal Dictionary project
