= Nick Kuenssberg =

Scottish textiles executive and investor (1942–2023)

Nicholas Christopher Kuenssberg OBE (28 October 1942 – 1 October 2023) was a Scottish textiles executive and investor.

== Early life and education ==
Kuenssberg was born in Edinburgh, Scotland to Ekkehard von Kuenssberg CBE, a German-born doctor, and Constance Kuenssberg (née Hardy), also a doctor. His father, a skilled skier, left Germany for Scotland in 1933, avoiding recruitment into the SS.

Kuenssberg attended Edinburgh Academy, where he captained the cricket team and participated in school plays, including playing Macbeth. He studied politics, philosophy, and economics at Wadham College, Oxford, followed by studies at Manchester Business School.

== Career ==
His career in the textile industry began at Coats Patons, a cotton thread manufacturer, where he managed operations in South America and Europe. He later served as a main board director of Coats Viyella and then as managing director of Dawson International, a knitwear firm.

After leaving Dawson International in 1995, Kuenssberg held numerous boardroom and committee roles. These included chairmanships at Stoddard International, Keronite, and Scott & Fyfe.

Kuenssberg's involvement in the arts and education sectors included board memberships at Glasgow's Citizens Theatre and Pitlochry Festival Theatre, and chairmanships at Glasgow School of Art and the Royal Conservatoire of Scotland. In the corporate sector, he held non-executive director positions at Scottish Power, Standard Life, and Bank of Scotland, and chaired companies in cloud computing and wellbeing streaming services.

Kuenssberg also served as a member of the advisory board and honorary professor at the Adam Smith Business School at the University of Glasgow, and as a visiting professor at Strathclyde Business School. Additionally, he was involved with Social Investment Scotland, the David Hume Institute, the Scottish Legal Aid Board, and other public service and educational organizations.

In 2004, Kuenssberg was appointed OBE.

== Personal life ==
Kuenssberg married Sally Robertson, daughter of Lord Robertson, in 1965, with whom he had three children: David, a director general at the Home Office; Joanna, a former UK high commissioner and senior executive at Shell plc; and Laura, a BBC Political Journalist.
