= Adam Fleming (journalist) =

British journalist

- Born: 2 April 1980 (age 46); Glasgow, Scotland
- Education: Hutchesons' Grammar School; Hertford College, Oxford
- Employer: The Herald • Daily Record • STV • BBC
- Notable work: Daily Politics; Newsround; Brexitcast; Newscast

Robert Adam Fleming (born 2 April 1980) is a Scottish journalist and presenter for BBC News. He was formerly its Chief Political correspondent, Brussels correspondent, and has previously worked for Daily Politics and Newsround. He co-presented the podcast and television programme Brexitcast, before becoming lead presenter of its successor, Newscast.

== Early life ==
Fleming was born in 1980 in Glasgow and educated there at Hutchesons' Grammar School, an independent school, from 1989 to 1998. He went on to Hertford College at Oxford University where he studied geography, graduating in 2001 with a first class degree. Whilst at Oxford, Fleming edited The Oxford Student newspaper and worked in local radio.

== Career ==
Fleming has worked in journalism for the Herald newspaper in Glasgow, the Daily Record and STV.

He began working for the BBC, and was sponsored by them to study broadcast journalism on a postgraduate diploma course at City University, London. Fleming worked on CBBC's news programme Newsround in 2002 whilst still studying. He has been a live reporter for BBC News 24 (in 2006), a Westminster reporter (in 2008) and a BBC Three 60 Seconds presenter.

As BBC News' Brussels correspondent, Fleming acted as a regular reporter on Daily Politics and its successor Politics Live. He focused on EU politics and particularly Brexit, establishing the podcast Brexitcast with political correspondent Chris Mason, political editor Laura Kuenssberg and Europe editor Katya Adler. He began presenting Newscast after Brexitcast came to an end, and was replaced as Brussels correspondent by Nick Beake in summer 2020. In December 2020 he was appointed as the BBC News' chief political correspondent.

In June 2022, Fleming took a break from Westminster to launch Radio 4's new programme and podcast AntiSocial.

He presented an eight-part documentary series about the rise and fall of Boris Johnson for BBC Radio 4 and BBC Sounds, released in 2022 and 2023.

Since summer 2024, he has been a regular stand-in presenter of Newsnight on BBC Two. He is a regular guest presenter on BBC 5 Live, hosting the Breakfast, phone-in, afternoon and late night shows.

Media offices
Preceded by Vicki Young	Chief Political Correspondent: BBC News; 2020–2022	Succeeded by Nick Eardley
