= James Wilson Robertson =

Governor-General of Nigeria from 1955 to 1960

Sir James Wilson Robertson KT GCMG GCVO KBE KStJ
- Portrait by Walter Bird, 1965

2nd Governor-General of Nigeria
- In office 15 June 1955 – 16 November 1960
- Monarch: Elizabeth II
- Preceded by: John Stuart Macpherson
- Succeeded by: Nnamdi Azikiwe

Personal details
- Born: 27 October 1899 Broughty Ferry, Dundee, Scotland
- Died: 23 September 1983 (aged 83) Wallingford, Oxfordshire, England
- Relatives: Ian Robertson, Lord Robertson (brother); Joanna Kuenssberg (great-niece); Laura Kuenssberg (great-niece); James Robertson (son)
- Education: Merchiston Castle School
- Alma mater: Balliol College, Oxford
- Occupation: Civil servant

Military service
- Branch/service: British Army
- Unit: Gordon Highlanders; Black Watch

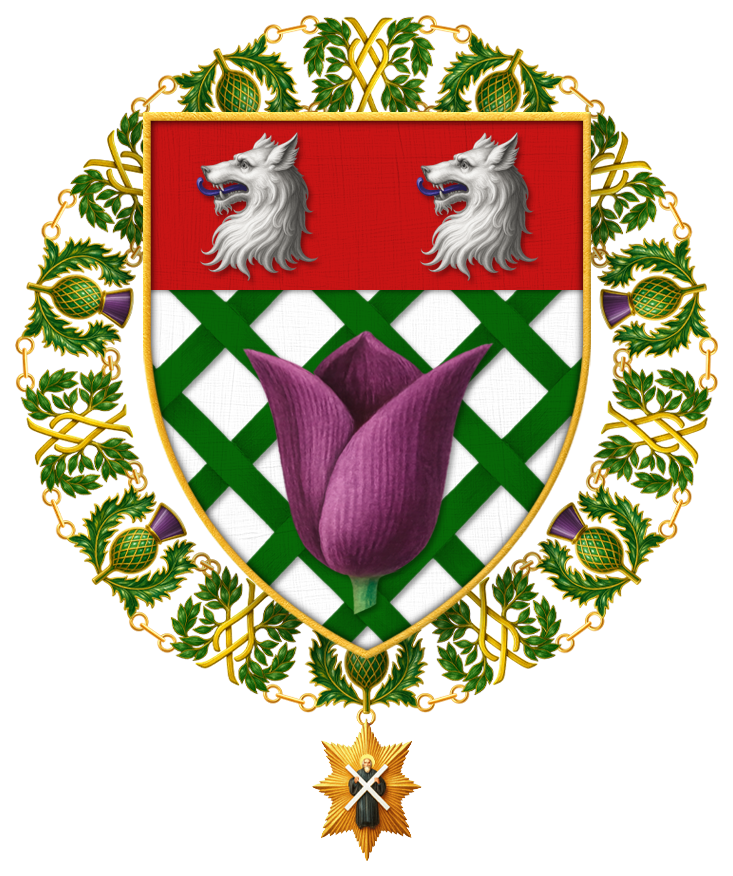
Shield of Arms of Sir James Wilson Robertson, KT, GCMG, GCVO, KBE, KStJ

Sir James Wilson Robertson, KT, GCMG, GCVO, KBE, KStJ (27 October 1899 – 23 September 1983) was a British civil servant who served as the last colonial governor-general of Nigeria from 1955 to 1960.

== Early life and education ==
He was educated at Merchiston Castle School in Edinburgh and Balliol College, Oxford. He served a Commission in the British Army with the Gordon Highlanders and the Black Watch. He received an honorary Doctor of Laws degree (LL.D.) from the University of Leeds in 1961.

== Career ==
After Oxford he joined the Sudan Political Service from 1922 to 1953, serving appointments in Blue Nile, White Nile, Fung, and Kordofan provinces and was the Civil Secretary from 1945 to 1953. In this position in 1947 he was chairman of the Juba Conference. He was then sent to British Guiana in January 1954 by Oliver Lyttelton, the then-Secretary of State for the Colonies to write the Robertson Commission Report to investigate the crisis in the country due to the election of the People's Progressive Party, who were seen as too friendly with the Communist organisations that had led to the suspension of the constitution.

He was then sent to Nigeria as a result of his work. He was Governor-General from 15 June 1955 to 16 November 1960 (representing the Queen as head of state from 1 October to 16 November 1960).

== Family ==
He married Nancy Walker in 1926. They had two children, a son and a daughter. His son was political and economic thinker and activist James Robertson. His brother was Ian Robertson, Lord Robertson, whose daughter Sally married Nick Kuenssberg OBE. His great-niece Laura Kuenssberg is a journalist. His first wife was Anne Mueller.

== Writings ==
Roberston wrote a memoir, Transition in Africa: From Direct Rule to Independence, published by Hurst, London, in 1974, that reflects on his nearly 40 years in Africa. It provides detail on both his administrative life and personal observations. In a final chapter, "Reflections", he accounts the swift collapse and disintegration of so much of what he and his fellow British servants of the Empire had constructed not only in the Sudan and Nigeria, but in all of Britain's former colonial African territories. Commenting on foreign concern about post-independence difficulties, he observed: "Americans have asked me: 'Why did you leave so soon, before the colonial territories were ready to rule themselves?' And when I have answered, 'Partly, I am sure, because of your pressure on us to go,' [they] have answered that they did not know then what they know now, and that we should have resisted their pressure." (p. 253)

Robertson made a notable contribution to a 1978 Oxford Symposium, Transfer of Power: the Colonial Administrator in the Age of De-colonisation, edited by A. H. M. Kirk-Greene (published, in 1979, by the Inter-Faculty Committee for African Studies, Oxford University), particularly his "The Governor as the Man in the Middle", (pp. 38–43); and "Summary of Discussion", (pp. 50–59). The Last of the Proconsuls: Letters of Sir James Robertson, edited by Graham F. Thomas, was published in 1994. It is a collection of letters Robertson sent to Thomas over 40 years mainly about the problems towards the end of the British Empire.

Government offices
Preceded by Sir John Stuart Macpherson	Governor-General of Nigeria; 1955–1960	Succeeded by Nnamdi Azikiwe
