= Hutchesons' Grammar School =

Independent school in Glasgow, Scotland

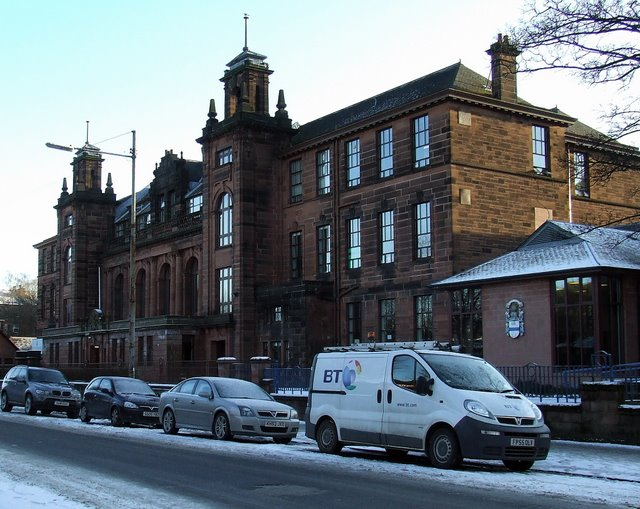
- School Coat of Arms Hutchesons' Grammar School On Kingarth Street

Location
- Beaton Road; Glasgow, G41 4NW; Scotland; 55.8363°N 4.282°W

Information
- Type: Private Independent day school
- Motto: Veritas (Latin) English: Truth
- Established: 1641; 385 years ago
- Founder: George Hutcheson and Thomas Hutcheson
- Rector: Mark Ronan
- Chair: John Macleod
- Governor: Hutchesons' Educational Trust
- Age: 3 to 18
- Houses: Argyle, Stuart, Lochiel, Montrose
- Alumni: Old Hutchesonians
- Website: www.hutchesons.org

Hutchesons' Grammar School is a private, co-educational day school for pupils aged 3–18 in Glasgow, Scotland. It was founded as Hutchesons' Boys' Grammar School by George Hutcheson and Thomas Hutcheson in 1641, making it the 19th oldest school in Scotland.

Prospective pupils must sit an entrance test and interview to gain admission. As of 2024, the school has around 1,300 pupils across its Pre-School, Primary and Secondary Schools and is governed by The Governors of Hutchesons' Educational Trust. Its current Rector is Mark Ronan.

Hutchesons' alumni include the politicians Humza Yousaf and Anas Sarwar, several members of the House of Lords and Madge Easton Anderson, the first female lawyer in the United Kingdom. Former pupils are known as Old Hutchesonians.

== History ==
=== Establishment ===
The school was founded in 1641 as Hutchesons' Hospital by brothers Thomas and George Hutcheson of Lambhill, Lanarkshire and originally opened to educate "twelve indigent orphans"

In 1799, plans for a new hospital commenced on Ingram Street, at the head of Hutchesons' Street although construction did not begin until 1802. The building, designed by architect David Hamilton, was completed in 1805 and is known today as Hutchesons' Hall, named after the school and its founders. The building was acquired by The National Trust for Scotland in 1982 and again in 1987 and renovations began. After suffering heavy water damage in 2008 the building was sold and after extensive renovations to preserve the interior, it opened as a restaurant in 2014. The building is listed as Category A.

=== Amalgamation ===
The Boys' and Girls' schools amalgamated in 1976, at the grounds where the Boys' school had moved to almost two decades prior to form the current secondary school. The Girls' school campus became the primary school and in 1994, a new pre-school block at the primary school was constructed.

=== Expansion ===
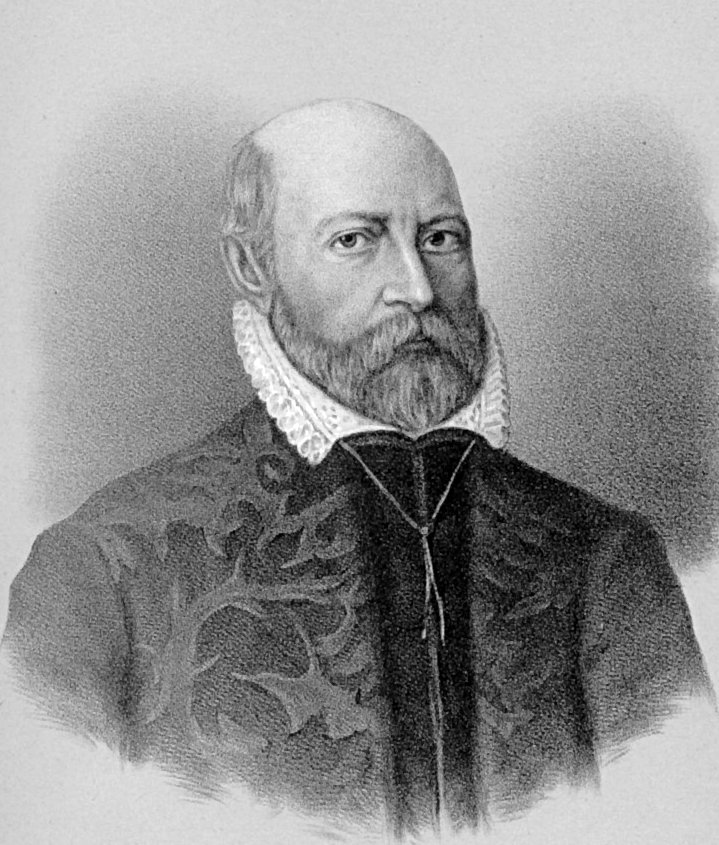
Thomas Hutcheson (1590–1641).

In 2001, the school expanded into the West End of Glasgow when it merged with Laurel Park School and created a nursery and primary school on Lilybank Terrace, although this has since closed. The building suffered heavy damage in a fire in November 2008, and again in early 2019.

=== Recent history ===
In 2021, the schools purchased a new sports complex in Pollok Country Park, previously owned by Craigholme School.

In 2022, the school obtained new playing fields also inside Pollok Country Park.

== Overview ==
=== Affiliations ===
Hutchesons' is a member of the Headmasters' and Headmistresses' Conference, the Independent Schools Council, and the Scottish Council of Independent Schools.

=== Houses ===
Pupils at the school are divided into the following four Houses:

- Montrose
- Stuart
- Lochiel
- Argyll

=== School tartan ===
The school tartan derives from the Hutcheson tartan with the colours changed to fit the school colours. It was adapted by Colin Hutcheson, a Governor of the Scottish Tartans Authority, and launched in March 2005.

The Tartan is worn on Founders Day every year as a kilt by the Head boy and Depute Head boy, as a skirt by the Head girl and Depute head girl and as a tie by the rector. Founders Day service is held annually at Glasgow Cathedral on 19 March. The tartan can also be found on the school scarf, which is worn with the winter uniform.

== Academics ==
The School follows the Scottish education system.

The School's results are well above the national average and are among the best in the country, In 2019, 89.2% of Highers and Advanced Highers were awarded grade A/B. The same year, 78.6% of National 5s were awarded grade A.

In 2019, the school had the second-highest exam results in Scotland, in 2022 they had the fifth-highest.

== Accolades ==
In November 2011, Hutchesons' Grammar School was named the 'Scottish Independent Secondary School of the Year' by the Independent Schools Council.

In December 2022, Hutchesons' Senior School was named in The Times top five Independent Secondary Schools in Scotland.

== Notable alumni ==
Notable alumni include, but are not limited to:

- Madge Easton Anderson – First Female Lawyer in the United Kingdom
- John Barbour – footballer and soldier killed in World War I
- Ailsa Carmichael, Lady Carmichael – Judge
- Alison Di Rollo – Solicitor General for Scotland
- Adam Fleming – BBC Chief Political Correspondent
- Derry Irvine (Baron Irvine of Lairg) – barrister, KC and former Lord Chancellor
- R.D. Gillespie psychiatrist,
- Lionel Charles Knights – King Edward VII Professor of English Literature, University of Cambridge, 1965–1973
- Daniel Lamont – Moderator of the General Assembly of the Church of Scotland from 1936 to 1937
- Archibald Leitch – architect
- John Mason – Scottish National Party MSP
- James Maxton – MP and leader of the Independent Labour Party
- Ian McColl, Baron McColl of Dulwich – Conservative member of the House of Lords
- Anas Sarwar – former Leader of the Scottish Labour Party
- J David Simons – novelist
- Carol Smillie – TV presenter and former model
- Ashley Storrie, comedian and presenter.
- Jonathan Adair Turner, Baron Turner of Ecchinswell – Businessman
- Humza Yousaf – First Minister of Scotland 2023–2024
