= John Horne =

Scottish geologist

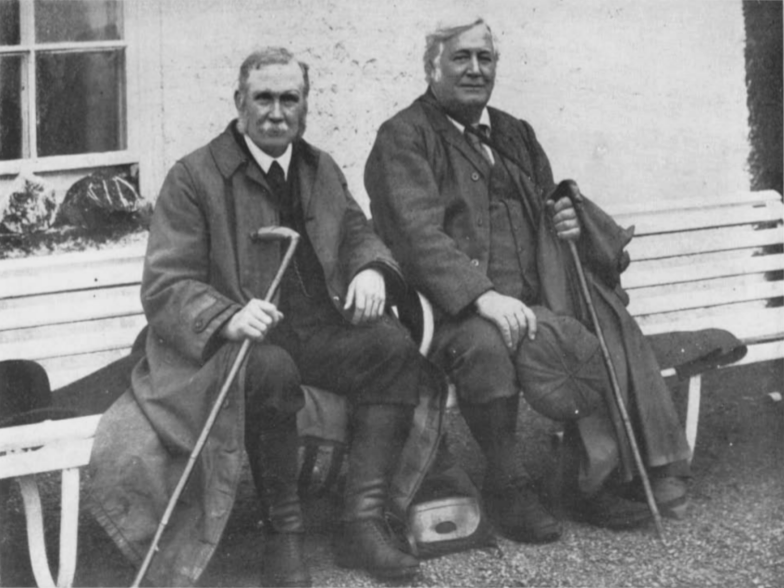
John Horne (left) and Ben Peach outside the Inchnadamph Hotel, 1912

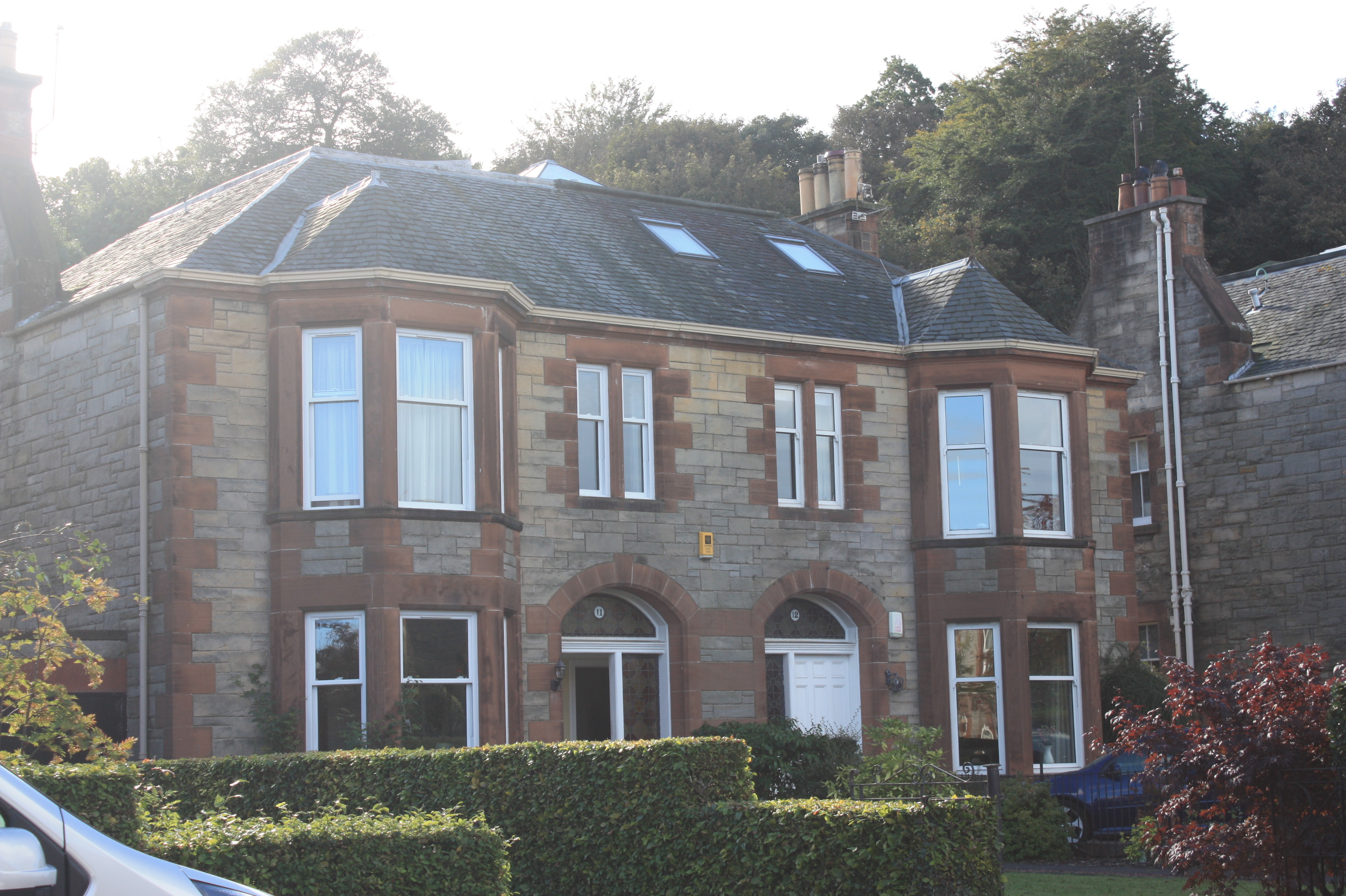
12 Keith Crescent, Edinburgh (right)

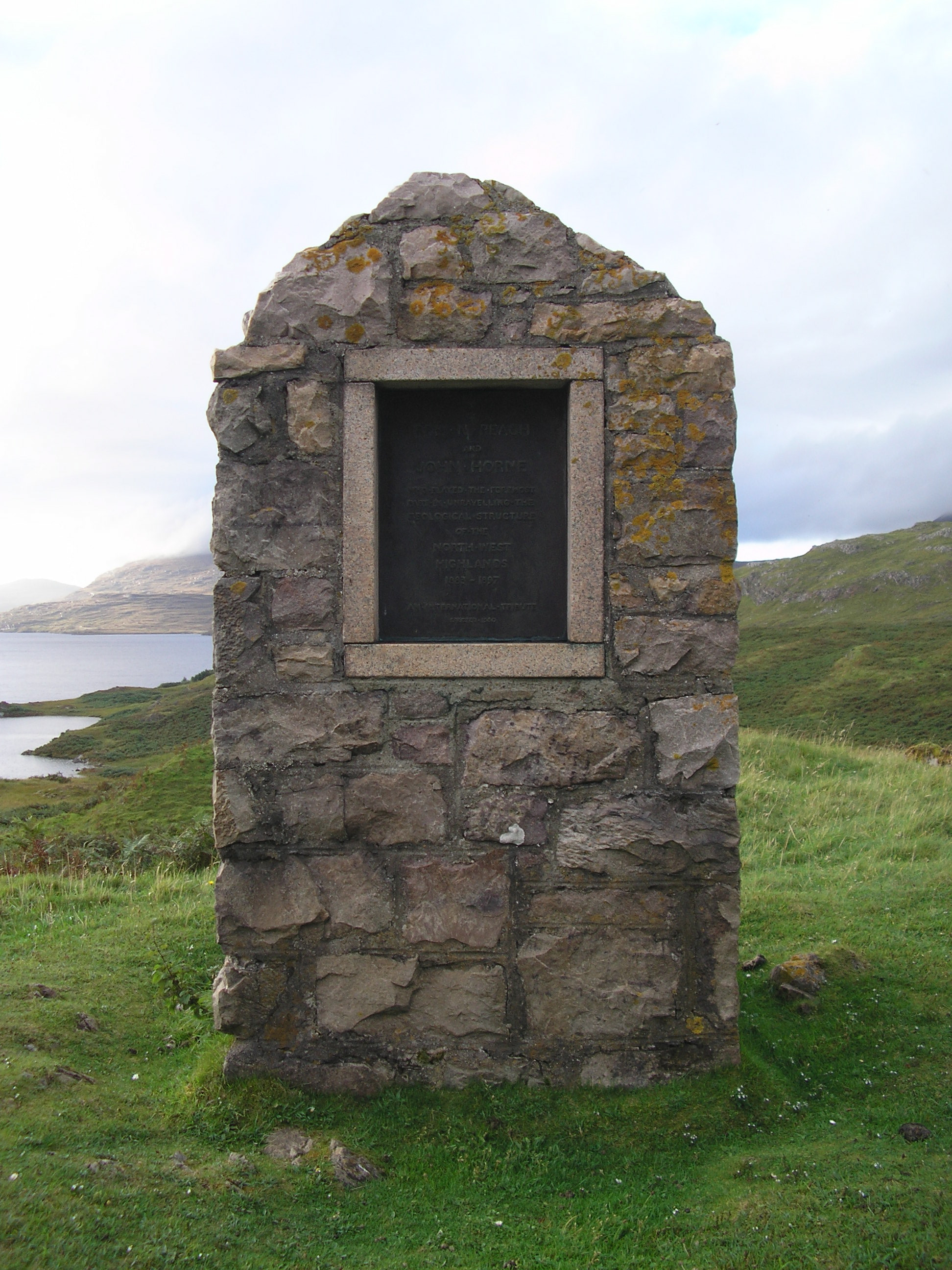
Peach and Horne monument

John Horne PRSE FRS FRSE FEGS LLD (1 January 1848 – 30 May 1928) was a Scottish geologist. He served as president of the Royal Society of Edinburgh from 1915 to 1919.

== Life ==
Horne was born on 1 January 1848, in Campsie, Stirlingshire, the son of Janet (née Braid) and James Horne of Newmill, a farmer. He was educated at the High School, Glasgow, and the University of Glasgow where he studied under Lord Kelvin. He left university without graduating at the age on 19.

In 1867 he joined the Scottish Branch of HM Geological Survey as an assistant and became an apprentice to Ben Peach. The two soon became good friends and collaborators. Horne was involved in mapping the Central Lowlands. Horne was a logical thinker and writer, complementing Peach's skills of resolving the internal structure of mountains by looking at the surface rocks. Thia approach allowed them to resolve a long-running debate on the "Highlands Controversy" in the 1907 publication of The Geological Structure of the North-West Highlands of Scotland. After their work in the Highlands, Horne and Peach wrote 'Northwest Highlands Memoir' in 1907. The work is regarded as one of the most important geological memoirs. Horne wrote most of the memoir himself. From 1901 until 1911, John Horne was the Director of the Scottish Branch of the Survey.

Horne was elected a Fellow of the Royal Society of Edinburgh in 1881, upon the proposal of Sir Archibald Geikie, Sir Charles Wyville Thomson, Peter Tait and Robert Gray, and won the Society's Neill Prize for 1889-92. Horne was very active in the affairs of the RSE and served as Councillor (1902-5; 1906-7; 1914–15), Vice-President (1907–13) and President (1915-19).

Horne was elected a Fellow of the Royal Society of London in 1900 and was a Fellow of the Royal Scottish Geographical Society. He also served as president of the Edinburgh Geological Society.

In 1901, he and Peach contributed a section on Scotland's geology to Francis Hindes Groome's book Ordnance Gazetteer of Scotland: A Graphic and Accurate Description of Every Place in Scotland.

In later life he lived at 12 Keith Crescent in Blackhall, Edinburgh.

He died on 30 May 1928 in Edinburgh.

== Family ==
He was married to Anna Leyland Taylor (d. 1926).

He was grandfather to the psychologist Thomas Arthur Munro.

== Recognition ==
A monument to the work of Peach and Horne was erected at Inchnadamph, close to the Moine Thrust where they did some of their best-known work. The inscription reads: "To Ben N Peach and John Horne who played the foremost part in unravelling the geological structure of the North West Highlands 1883-1897. An international tribute. Erected 1930.". As well as the 1930 memorial at Inchnadamph, a statue of the two geologists was erected at Knockan Crag in 2001.

== See also ==
- Knockan Crag
- Inchnadamph
- North West Highlands Geopark
- Geology of Scotland
