= NneNne Iwuji-Eme =

British diplomat

Her Excellency NneNne Iwuji-Eme
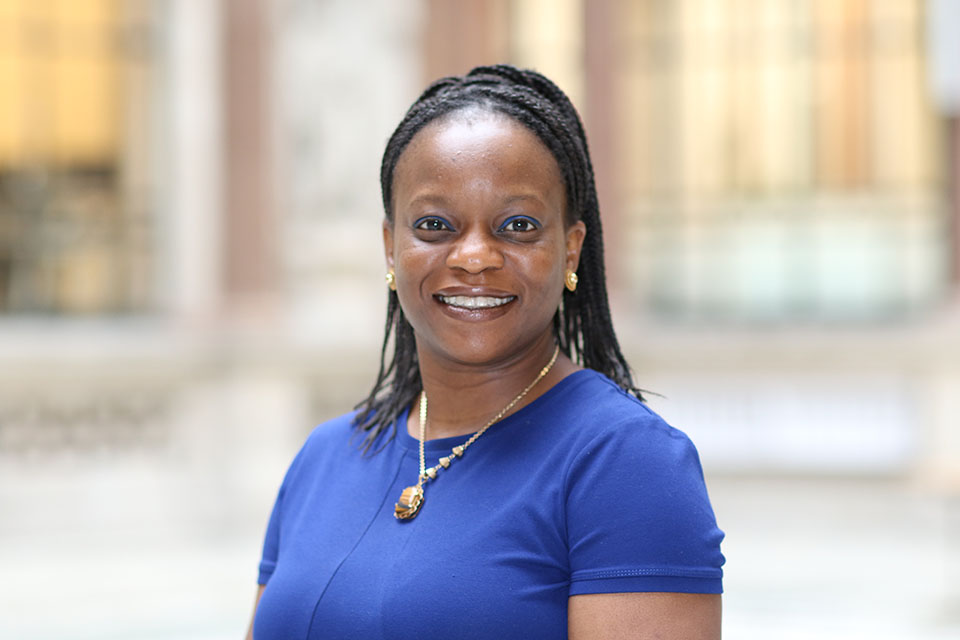
- Iwuji-Eme in 2018

High Commissioner of the United Kingdom to Mozambique
- In office July 2018 – October 2022
- Monarchs: Elizabeth II; Charles III
- Prime Minister: Theresa May; Boris Johnson; Liz Truss
- Preceded by: Joanna Kuenssberg
- Succeeded by: Helen Lewis

Personal details
- Born: Truro, Cornwall, England
- Children: 1
- Education: Saint Felix School; University of Manchester

NneNne Iwuji-Eme // is a British diplomat. From July 2018 to October 2022, she was the High Commissioner of the United Kingdom to Mozambique. She was the first black woman to represent the United Kingdom as a high commissioner.

== Early life ==
Iwuji-Eme, who is of Igbo Nigerian heritage, was born in Truro, Cornwall, England, to parents who worked for the United Nations. She was educated at St Felix School, a boarding school in Southwold, Suffolk, from 1990 to 1995. She studied economics at the University of Manchester.

== Career ==
Iwuji-Eme began her professional career in 1999 as an economic adviser at the Department for the Environment, Food and Rural Affairs (Defra). In 2002, she joined to the Foreign and Commonwealth Office (FCO), where she served as Head of Africa, Middle East and Transition Economies in the Economic Policy Department.

Over a diplomatic career spanning more than sixteen years, she held variety of roles with the Foreign, Commonwealth and Development Office (FCDO), including Economic Adviser for Africa and Chief Press Officer to the Minister for Africa. She also gained experience in the private sector, working for Royal Dutch Shell.

Prior to her appointment to her current post as High Commissioner of the United Kingdom to Mozambique she was the UK's First Secretary in Brazil.

In March 2018, she was appointed to be the High Commissioner of the United Kingdom to Mozambique and took up her post in July 2018 in succession to Joanna Kuenssberg. She is the first black woman to represent the United Kingdom as a high commissioner. She stepped down as high commissioner in October 2022, and was succeeded by Helen Lewis.

== Personal life ==
Iwuji-Eme has one son.

In 2016, along with her brothers Odiri and Chukwudi Iwuji, Iwuji-Eme founded the film production company Chudor House.
