= Ian McColl, Baron McColl of Dulwich =

British surgeon, professor, politician and member of the House of Lords

The Right Honourable The Lord McColl of Dulwich CBE FKC
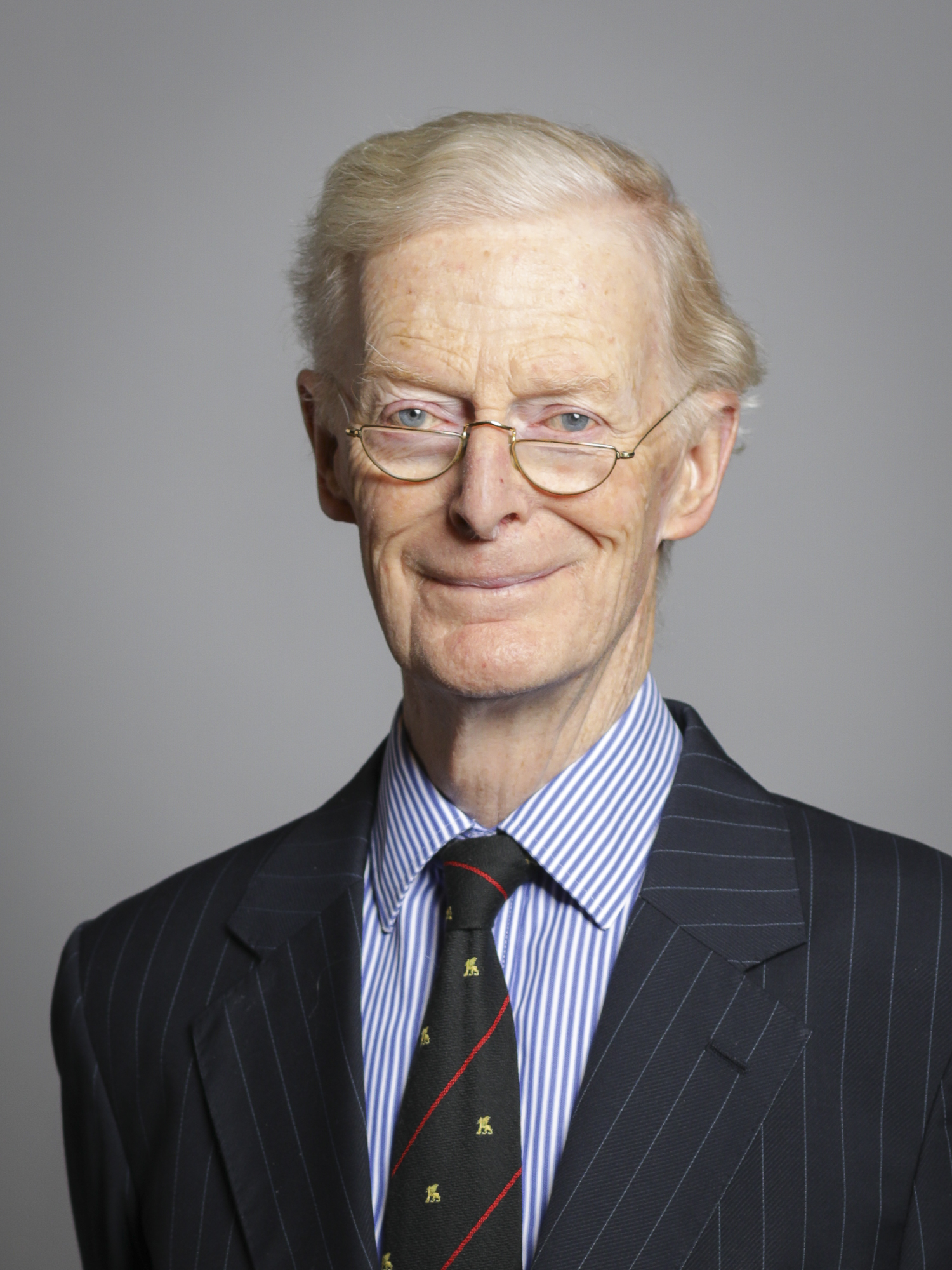
- Official portrait, 2019

Member of the House of Lords
- Lord Temporal
- Life peerage 25 July 1989

Personal details
- Born: Ian McColl; 6 January 1933 (age 93)
- Party: Conservative
- Education: Hutchesons' Grammar School, Glasgow; St Paul's School, London; University of London

Ian McColl, Baron McColl of Dulwich, CBE, FKC (born 6 January 1933), is a British surgeon, professor, politician and Conservative member of the House of Lords. McColl was made a life peer for his work for disabled people in the Queen's Birthday Honours in 1989, which was gazetted on 29 July 1989 with the style and title of Baron McColl of Dulwich, of Bermondsey in the London Borough of Southwark. He was Parliamentary Private Secretary to Prime Minister John Major (of which he served concurrently with John Ward MP) from 1994 to 1997 for which he was appointed a Commander of the Order of the British Empire (CBE) in 1997.

From 1997 to 2000, he was a Shadow Minister for Health. He is also a trustee and surgeon to the international charity Mercy Ships.

McColl was educated at Hutchesons' Grammar School, Glasgow, and St. Paul's School, London. He studied medicine at the University of London and was Professor of surgery at Guy's Hospital until 1998. He is a Fellow of King's College London, where he continues to teach on the Guy's Campus.

== Legislative proposals ==
In June 2015, he introduced a private member's bill to prohibit the advertising of prostitution, the Advertising of Prostitution (Prohibition) Bill 2015–16.

On 26 June 2017, he introduced the Modern Slavery (Victim Support) Bill, a private member's bill to "make provision about identifying and supporting victims of modern slavery". The Bill completed its House of Lords stages on 10 May 2018 and was presented to the House of Commons on 18 May 2018. The Bill would amend the period of assistance and support offered to victims with a conclusive grounds status to 12 months after a 45-day period of "reflection and recovery" ends. The same Bill was re-introduced for a First Reading in the House of Lords on 13 January 2020, and, as of 27 October 2022, is in the Second Reading in the House of Lords.

Coat of arms of Ian McColl, Baron McColl of Dulwich

Crest
A demi-lion rampant Or, head and mane Gules, gorged with three barrulets wavy Argent, flanked by oak branches formed chevronwise as an “M” leaved Argent and fructed Or, on an escroll Proper.
Escutcheon
Azure, a cross Or between in the first quarter a leg embowed in armour; in the second quarter a dove volant to the sinister; in the third quarter a fleam, and in the fourth quarter a fish haurient, all Argent.
Supporters
Dexter, a dachshund rampant Proper, sinister, an eagle close also Proper armed Or and crowned with an ancient crown Gold.
Motto
Dare Quam Accipere
