= George Hutcheson =

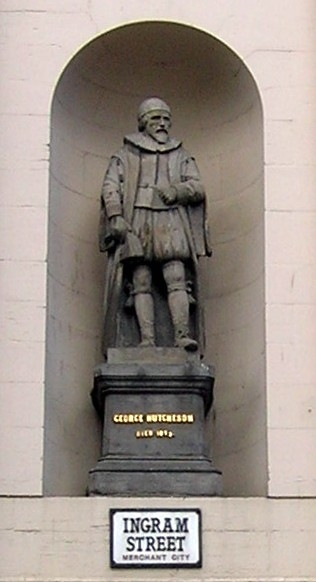
Statue of George Hutcheson in Glasgow

George Hutcheson (died 1639), of Lambhill, Lanarkshire, was joint-founder with his younger brother Thomas Hutcheson, of Hutchesons' Hospital, Glasgow, which continues to live on today as the independent Hutchesons' Grammar School

== Life ==
George Hutcheson became a public writer and notary in Glasgow, and by his success in business added considerably to the wealth he had inherited from his father. For a long time he lived in the house where he carried on business, situated on the north side of the Trongate, near the Old Tolbooth. In 1611 he built for his residence the house on the River Kelvin near its junction with the Clyde, known as the Partick Castle, and, to some sources, as "Bishop's Castle," since it once was the site of a country retreat for the medieval Bishops of Glasgow.

Hutcheson acquired a high reputation for honesty, and as an illustration of his moderation in his charges, it is stated that he would never take more than sixteen pennies Scots for writing an ordinary bond, be the sum ever so large. He died, apparently unmarried, 31 December 1639, and was buried on the south side of Glasgow Cathedral.

== Hutchesons' Hospital ==
By deed bearing date 16 December 1639 he mortified and disposed a tenement of land on the west side of the old West Port of Glasgow with yard and tenements there, for the building of one perfyte hospital for entertainment of the poor, aged, decrepit men to be placed therein, for whose maintenance after the hospital should be built he also mortified certain bonds amounting to the principal sum of twenty thousand merks. The inmates were to be aged and decrepit men above fifty years of age who had been of honest life and conversation. Other mortifications to the hospital were made by his brother Thomas. George also granted legacies to his brother Thomas and to three nephews, but descendants of two of these nephews died poor men in the hospital. The hospital lives on today as Hutchesons’ Grammar School.
