= Brexitcast =

BBC podcast

- Opening titles
- Presented by: Laura Kuenssberg; Katya Adler; Adam Fleming; Chris Mason
- Country of origin: United Kingdom
- Original language: English

Production
- Executive producer: Rob Burley
- Editor: Dino Sofos

Original release
- Release: 12 September 2019 (television) – 30 January 2020 (television); 12 November 2020 (one-off edition); 24 June 2021 (one-off edition)

Related
- Electioncast; Newscast

Brexitcast is a British political talk show and television programme produced by BBC Radio 5 Live and BBC News. It was launched on 5 June 2017 following the success of Electioncast, a podcast that had covered that year's general election. Originally aired on radio, it was announced on 3 June 2019 that Brexitcast had been commissioned as a television programme for BBC One. It was the first BBC podcast to be commissioned for television.

The first televised edition of Brexitcast aired on BBC One and the BBC News channel on 12 September 2019, and was later briefly accompanied by the daily Electioncast which returned as a daily podcast for the duration of the 2019 general election. On 5 January 2020 it was announced that Brexitcast would be renamed Newscast after the United Kingdom's exit from the European Union on 31 January. The final regular edition of Brexitcast was released on 30 January 2020. An edition was later aired in November 2020. The first edition of Newscast aired on 6 February.

Online, episodes of Brexitcast had amassed cumulative 8 million downloads by 1 September 2019 and over 18 million by January 2020, and its first edition on BBC One attracted over a million viewers. It has received mixed reviews from critics, with a reviewer for the New Statesman praising it for its impartiality, and The Guardian for its presenters' adeptness at explaining the subject matter. However, some have been more critical, particularly of the television version, which a reviewer for The Glasgow Herald described as dull.

== Overview ==
Recorded on a weekly basis, the show takes a look at issues relating to Brexit, the term for the United Kingdom's withdrawal from the European Union, explaining the subject to listeners in an informative but light-hearted fashion. The series styles itself as providing its audience with "geeky Brexit gossip". The podcast is presented by BBC political editor Laura Kuenssberg, Europe editor Katya Adler, Europe correspondent Adam Fleming, and political correspondent Chris Mason.

In addition to the weekly recordings, the team have also recorded special editions of the podcast to tie-in with specific events, and on topics requested by viewers who seek further information on a specific subject. Kuenssberg has said of these editions, "Because of the way that you can use social media now?...they know when we are taping and so we can say, 'What do you want to know?' Other times, people will request an episode and we'll be, like, 'Oh God, have we got time to do it?'".

The televised edition is recorded on the day of broadcast, before being transmitted later that evening. It is aired on the BBC News Channel at 9.30pm, before being repeated on BBC One at 11.35pm. The programme is edited and broadcast within two hours of the end of its recording.

== History ==
=== Electioncast ===
Prior to Brexitcast, a similar podcast titled Electioncast was launched in 2017 to cover that year's general election. It returned again at the start of the campaign for the 2019 United Kingdom general election. Presented by the Brexitcast team, Electioncast aired on the BBC News Channel at 21:30 as well as in the same podcast feed as Brexitcast every weekday for the duration of the election, except for Thursdays when Brexitcast aired as normal.

=== Podcast ===
Brexitcast was launched in June 2017 as a podcast, replacing Electioncast which had started on 8 May 2017 to cover the 2017 general election. It is available to download from the BBC Sounds app and also aired on BBC Radio 5 Live. The first episode of Brexitcast was released on 19 June 2017 after the conclusion of the election. On 5 December 2018 the Brexitcast team of presenters appeared on BBC One's The One Show to answer Brexit-related questions from the audience ahead of a planned vote in the House of Commons.

In May 2019, Brexitcast was the recipient of the Listeners' Choice Award at the British Podcast Awards.

=== Television series ===
On 13 June 2019, the BBC announced that it would be produced as a television programme for BBC One, launching in September. Brexitcast airs in a late-night Thursday slot after Question Time, and replaced This Week, which ended after sixteen years on air following presenter Andrew Neil's decision to leave the series. It was also confirmed that Brexitcast would continue to be available as a downloadable podcast, with extra editions recorded to coincide with significant events. Brexitcast is the first BBC podcast to be commissioned as a television programme, and follows other podcasts such as The Ricky Gervais Show and My Dad Wrote a Porno in making the transition to screen.

The first televised edition of Brexitcast was aired on 12 September 2019, debuting firstly on the BBC News Channel at 9.30, before being shown on BBC One at 11.35pm. The first edition was watched by an average one million viewers. On 10 October, the journalist and musician Rhodri Marsden appeared as a guest on the programme where he debuted tracks from his Brexit-inspired disco concept album The Hustle. It then appeared on the iTunes UK Album Chart, where it quickly began to outsell ABBA Gold. In November 2019, a discussion on Brexitcast about "shitposting" attracted some media comment after Kuenssberg gave an incorrect description of the term.

On 23 January 2020 it was announced that Brexitcast would be renamed Newscast following the United Kingdom withdrawal from the European Union on 31 January. The edition aired on 30 January, the day before the UK's exit, was recorded before a live audience at London's BBC Radio Theatre. The final edition of Brexitcast, recorded as a podcast for radio and titled "Over and Out!", was released on 1 February 2020. The first edition of Newscast aired on 6 February, and while continuing to discuss Brexit, also focused on other events such as the 2020 Irish general election.

Brexitcast has returned on occasion for one-off editions. An edition aired on 12 November 2020 to discuss the latest Brexit developments. It also aired on 24 June 2021 to mark the five years since the Brexit referendum result of 23 June 2016. The four presenters were again Adam Fleming, Laura Kuenssberg, Chris Mason and Katya Adler.

== Reception ==
At the time of its BBC One launch, the Brexitcast podcast had been downloaded over eight million times, and the Financial Times reported that it regularly topped both the weekly podcast and iTunes charts, particularly editions recorded after significant events in the Brexit process. By the end of January 2020 it had received eighteen million downloads.

Writing about Brexitcast for the New Statesman in March 2018, Antonia Quirke described its style as "fairly relaxed" and commented on its impartiality: "Probably the best thing about Brexitcast is that there isn't a great deal of lamenting going on". Prospect magazine named the podcast among the best podcasts for June 2019, describing it as "a funny, up-to-the-minute and behind-the-scenes guide to Brexit from the BBC's political correspondents". Charlotte Runcie, writing in The Daily Telegraph, described Brexitcast as "excellent...funny, well-informed and refreshingly sane", but questioned whether the format would transfer successfully to television. The i newspaper included it in a list of podcasts to "help guide you through Brexit and beyond".

The television version has received a mixed reaction from critics. Following the broadcast of the first television edition of Brexitcast, Alison Rowat of the Glasgow Herald questioned the logic of creating a TV version, which she described as "watching four people sitting in a row. Very dull", and she compared it unfavourably with the podcast version, concluding "a quick check on the podcast version of the TV show on Sounds showed Brexitcast was still better in sound than in vision". Joel Golby of The Guardian has emphasised the show's nerdish nature, describing Brexitcast as "TV for people who can recite their credit score from memory", and he was largely positive in his review of its content: "While it isn't pretty, it is clever: an informed conversation about the day's politics by people who do that smart-person snicker instead of an actual real laugh".

== See also ==
- Political podcast
