= Newscast (podcast) =

BBC podcast and television programme

- Genre: News podcast
- Created by: BBC News
- Presented by: Adam Fleming; Chris Mason; Laura Kuenssberg; Paddy O'Connell
- Country of origin: United Kingdom
- Original language: English

Production
- Producers: Jack MacLaren; Miranda Slade; Chris Flynn; Gemma Roper; Anna Harris; Shiler Mahmoudi; Chris Gray; Gabriel Purcell-Davis; Jem Westgate
- Editors: Chris Gray, Sam Bonham
- Running time: 30–40 minutes
- Production company: BBC News

Original release
- Network: BBC iPlayer, BBC One and BBC News (TV); BBC Sounds, BBC Radio 4 and BBC Radio 5 Live (podcast)
- Release: 6 February 2020 – present

Related
- Brexitcast; Americast; The Coronavirus Newscast; Ukrainecast; Eurovisioncast; The Conflict: Israel-Gaza

Newscast is a UK daily podcast and weekly television programme produced by BBC News. It takes a look at the day's main news, political events and talking points. It is the most listened to podcast on BBC Sounds and consistently ranks as the most popular news podcast in the United Kingdom. It is presented by the BBC's former chief political correspondent Adam Fleming with political editor Chris Mason.

== History ==
Originally launched as an audio podcast in 2017 to cover that year's general election and titled Electioncast, it was subsequently renamed Brexitcast. Its first televised edition was transmitted in September 2019, and it was relaunched in its current format in February 2020. The decision to relaunch the podcast came in January 2020, when it was announced that Brexitcast would be renamed Newscast after the United Kingdom's exit from the European Union on 31 January. The final edition of Brexitcast was released on 1 February 2020, with the first edition of Newscast airing on 6 February.

A daily version of the podcast titled The Coronavirus Newscast was launched on 18 March 2020 to cover the coronavirus pandemic. On 13 July 2020, it reverted to Newscast. Regular guest presenters include Marianna Spring and Jane Garvey.

On 18 October 2022, hundreds of subscribers watched a live recording of Newscast with its sister podcasts Americast (which talks about American politics) and Ukrainecast (which talks about the Russian invasion of Ukraine) in the BBC Radio Theatre for the inaugural Castfest Live.

In January 2023, a non news spin-off was announced called Eurovisioncast, presented by Eurovision Song Contest 2016 winner Måns Zelmerlöw, journalist Nina Warhurst, BBC News Eurovision reporter Daniel Rosney, and BBC Radio Merseyside's Ngunan Adamu, based on the 2023 Eurovision Song Contest being hosted in Liverpool.

On 30 August 2023, BBC Sounds announced it would be introducing weekend editions of its Newscast from Saturday 2 September, with presenters Laura Kuenssberg and Paddy O'Connell.

Following the Gaza war, another spin off called The Conflict: Israel-Gaza, presented by senior presenter and chief international correspondent Lyse Doucet on the ground with the Newscast team and correspondents in the region, was launched, giving a daily recap and analysis of the day's events.

On 3 July 2024, The Newscast All-Dayer was launched on BBC Sounds to provide live coverage of the 2024 general election.

== Notable guests ==
The then Duke of Cambridge, Prince William discussed the first round of his Earthshot Prize when the podcast visited Kensington Palace.

Swedish climate change activist Greta Thunberg was interviewed on Newscast when she published her book about climate change.

Prime minister Keir Starmer appeared on the podcast on Saturday 12 October 2024.

Former prime minister Tony Blair has appeared several times.
