= Ian Robertson, Lord Robertson =

Scottish judge (1912–2005)

Ian MacDonald Robertson, Lord Robertson (30 October 1912 – 21 July 2005) was a Scottish High Court of Justiciary judge who contributed greatly to Scots law.

== Early life ==
Robertson was born on 30 October 1912 in Edinburgh, the youngest of the six children of Margaret Eva Wilson and James Robertson. His father was 66 when he was born. He was educated at Merchiston Castle School between 1926 and 1931 and had an outstanding school career, being appointed a Senior Prefect in his final year. He was also a notable sportsman, captaining the 1st XV rugby union side, and playing for the 1st XI cricket team. He then attended Balliol College, Oxford, following in the footsteps of his older brother Sir James Robertson.

Returning to Scotland he graduated LLB at the University of Edinburgh in 1937, and served his apprenticeship as a Writer to the Signet with Shepherd and Wedderburn, but soon found his preferred field as an advocate. He regarded his life as having been transformed by meeting Anna Glen, daughter of Judge James Fulton Glen, of Tampa, Florida, United States, at her 21st birthday party at the Gleneagles Hotel. They married and had one son and two daughters, sharing 63 years together before she died in 2002.

When World War II broke out, Robertson joined the 8th Battalion The Royal Scots, serving first as a weapons instructor. He was later commissioned as captain and intelligence officer for the 44th Lowland Brigade (15th Scottish Division), he distinguished himself in Normandy and NW Europe and the campaign from D-Day to the end of the war, being mentioned in dispatches. He wrote an account of the action, "From Normandy to the Baltic", printed in Germany before he returned to Britain.

== Career ==
His career as an advocate was soon established. He took silk in 1954, later serving as Sheriff Principal of Ayr and Bute (1961–1966) and then of Perth and Angus (1966). In 1966, he was appointed to the High Court bench.

His friend James Mackay, Baron Mackay of Clashfern said: "He was a meticulous, courteous and diligent judge and a great believer in the reputation of Scots Law. He was sensitive to any interference by the Executive in the work of the Courts."

=== Notable cases ===
Robertson presided over the 1974 case of Jessie McTavish, a Glasgow nurse accused of the murder of one of her patients and the assault of four others. In summing up, he neglected to mention her denial of a police claim that she had admitted to mercy killing during an interview. McTavish was convicted but Robertson's omission was used as the basis for an appeal the following year and McTavish's sentence was overturned.

== Further positions ==
Robertson was also chairman of the Scottish Joint Council for Teachers' Salaries (1965–1981); an assessor on University of Edinburgh Court (1967–1981); chairman of the Edinburgh Centre for Rural Economy (1967–1985); chairman of the Centre of Tropical Veterinary Medicine; and chairman of the Scottish Valuation Advisory Council (1977–1986). The first Scottish judge to be a member of the International Union of Judges, he served for 13 years (1974–1987). He was on the board of governors of Merchiston Castle School 1954-2005 and was chairman 1970–1996.

Robertson also received an Honorary Doctorate from Heriot-Watt University in 1988

He played golf into his eighties, particularly at Muirfield where he was captain from 1970 to 1972.

He died on 21 July 2005 at the age of 92.

== Family ==
His brother was James Wilson Robertson, the last British Governor-General of Nigeria, while his daughter Sally married businessman Nick Kuenssberg.

His grandchildren include Laura Kuenssberg, the BBC political editor from 2015 to 2022, David Kuenssberg who is Director General, Corporate and Delivery at the Home Office, and Joanna Kuenssberg, who is a diplomat and served as the British High Commissioner to Mozambique from 2014 until 2018.
