= David Henderson (psychiatrist) =

Scottish physician and psychiatrist

Sir David Kennedy Henderson FRSE FRCPE (24 April 1884 – 20 April 1965) was a Scottish physician and psychiatrist and served as president of the Royal College of Physicians of Edinburgh 1949 to 1951.

Portrait of Henderson, c. 1949

== Biography ==
He was born on 24 April 1884 in Dumfries, Scotland. In 1913 he was awarded an MD by the University of Edinburgh for his thesis "Cerebral syphilis a clinical analysis of twenty-six cases, seven with autopsy".

He co-published with Robert Dick Gillespie A Textbook of Psychiatry (first edition 1927), which became internationally influential for several decades. A series of lectures he gave in New York, United States, were published as Psychopathic states in 1939, and ended up contributing to a narrowing of the public understanding of psychopathy as violently antisocial, though Henderson had described various different types many of which were not violent or criminal. The Henderson Hospital, a specialist national unit in London set up to manage and treat the now contested diagnosis of 'psychopathic' personality disorder, was named after him.

He was physician-superintendent in charge at the Gartnavel Royal Hospital in Glasgow from 1921 to 1932. In 1932 he replaced the late Dr George Matthew Robertson as Physician Superintendent of the Edinburgh Royal Hospital, being replaced in turn in 1955 by Dr Thomas Arthur Munro.

His textbook on psychiatry has been described as the key to the Glasgow approach to mental illness, and Henderson in turn credited the approach of the influential Adolf Meyer whom he had worked with in America. Henderson also studied for some months in Germany with a key founder of modern psychiatry, Emil Kraepelin, whom he admired but found lacking in sensitivity to patients.

In 1934 he was elected a member of the Harveian Society of Edinburgh and in 1946 he was elected to the Aesculapian Club of Edinburgh. He was knighted in 1947 and elected president of the Royal College of Physicians of Edinburgh in 1949. The portrait of Henderson by David Alison is held by the Royal College of Physicians of Edinburgh.

== Personal life ==
On October 31, 1917 he married Margaret Van Vranken Mabon, daughter of the late psychiatrist Dr. William Van Vranken Mabon, Superintendent of the Manhattan State Hospital and one of the foremost alienists in the United States of America at that time. They had 3 daughters. Henderson's wife Margaret was also the niece of James B. Mabon, banker and president of the New York Stock Exchange (May 1912-May 1914). Her grandfather was Reverend Dr. William Augustus Van Vranken Mabon (1822-1892) who was a student of Union College 1840 and 1882, New Brunswick Theological Seminary 1844, and Rutgers College (Rutgers University) 1861. He was the pastor of Grove Church in North Bergen, New Jersey from 1846-1881. He was a professor of New Brunswick Theological Seminary from 1881-1892.

Henderson died on 20 April 1965 in Edinburgh, Scotland.

== Legacy ==
Henderson's student Donald Ewen Cameron, who also worked at the Gartnavel Hospital, would write an obituary for Henderson in the American Journal of Psychiatry. Cameron would rise to international prominence as president of the Canadian Psychiatric Association, American Psychiatric Association and World Psychiatric Association, but ultimately be known for conducting harmful experiments on mental patients as part of the MKUltra project. Henderson's approach as expressed in his textbook is also thought to have influenced the infamous 'antipsychiatrist' R.D. Laing who later worked at the Gartnavel Hospital. The Henderson Hospital to which he gave his name evolved into a Democratic Therapeutic Community (DTC) that became an international centre of excellence for the treatment of survivors of severe trauma, before changes in healthcare funding in the United Kingdom forced its closure in 2008. The Henderson Heritage Group, in which people who have the experience of having lived at or worked in the Henderson Hospital DTC work together to preserve the legacy of the hospital, continues to promote the work of the Henderson and to curate its archives.

Academic offices
Preceded by William Douglas Denton Small	President of the Royal College of Physicians of Edinburgh; 1949–1951	Succeeded by William Alister Alexander
