= Robert Dick Gillespie =

Scottish psychiatrist (1897–1945)

Robert Dick Gillespie (15 December 1897, Glasgow - 30 October 1945) was a Scottish psychiatrist who made a significant contribution to the development of psychiatry. He co-authored A Textbook of Psychiatry with David Henderson, the first edition of which appeared in 1927. He worked on updated editions until 1940 when the fifth edition was published. A contemporary review in Brain recognised that this textbook had become the standard book on the subject. The sixth edition in which he participated in updating, was published in 1945 shortly before his death.

Robert was born in Glasgow to Campbell and Helenor Margaret (Beattie) Gillespie. After attending Hutchesons' Grammar School he went on to study at University of Glasgow. He worked at the Western Infirmary, a teaching hospital linked to the University, he then took on the role of assistant physician at the Glasgow Royal Asylum, Gartnavel, which was directed by David Henderson. He qualified as a Doctor of Medicine in 1924, and then in 1925 worked as an assistant psychiatrist at The Henry Phipps Psychiatric Clinic. Here he came under the influence of Dr Adolf Meyer who ran the clinic. Meyer's influence was shown in his collaborative work with Henderson up and till his death.
