= Hutchesons' Hall =

Building in Glasgow, Scotland

Coordinates: 55.8598°N 4.24656°W

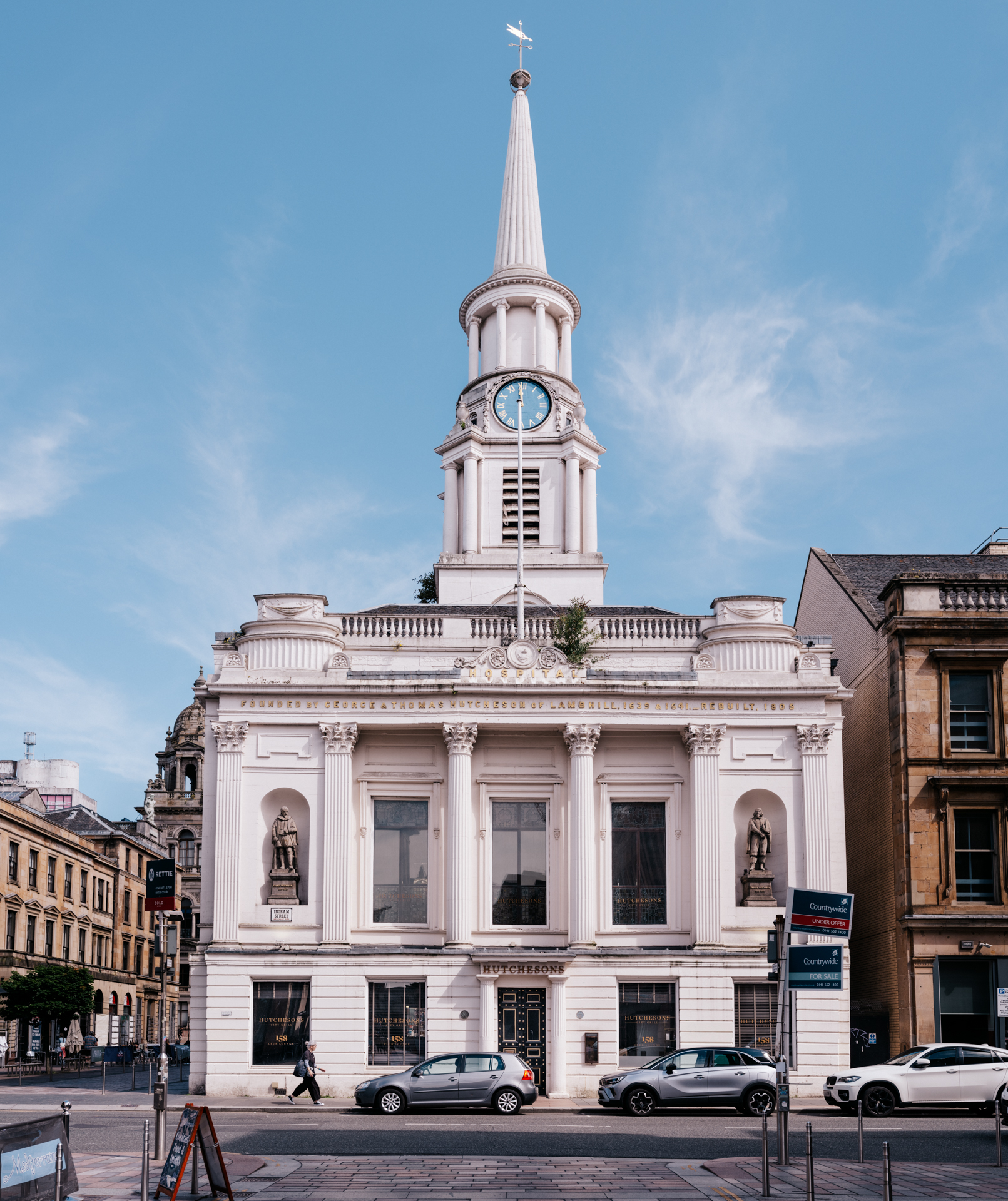
Hutchesons' Hall

Hutchesons' Hall is an early nineteenth-century building in Ingram Street, in the centre of Glasgow, Scotland. It is owned and maintained by The National Trust for Scotland, and is a category A listed building.

The current building was constructed, as Hutchesons' Hospital, between 1802 and 1805 to a design by the Scottish architect David Hamilton. This building was to replace an earlier hospital of 1641 in the city's Trongate, which needed to be removed to created Hutcheson Street. Hamilton's design incorporates in its frontage statues (carved in 1649 by James Colquhoun) from this earlier hospital.

Hutcheson's Hospital was built with monies left in the will of brothers George Hutcheson (c. 1580-1639) and Thomas Hutcheson (1589-1641) for the purposes of building a hospital for the elderly and a school for poor boys. The school is still operating today, although fee-paying, as Hutchesons' Grammar School.

In 1876, the architect John Baird was commissioned to refurbish the hall. This work heightened the structure and added a feature staircase.

The building fell into disrepair and had been empty since 2008. In June 2014, having undergone a £1.4 million refurbishment, it was restored by James Rusk of The Rusk Company and opened as a three flooring dining venue – Hutcheson's Steak and Seafood House.

Due to the COVID, the venue had been closed for two years. However, it recently underwent refurbishment and reopened in May 2023 under new management.
