= List of high commissioners of the United Kingdom to Mozambique =

The high commissioner of the United Kingdom to Mozambique is the United Kingdom's foremost diplomatic representative in the Republic of Mozambique, and head of the UK's diplomatic mission in Maputo.

Mozambique gained independence from Portugal in 1975. From then until 1995, the British heads of mission were ambassadors. In 1996, Mozambique joined the Commonwealth of Nations; Commonwealth countries exchange high commissioners rather than ambassadors. Since 1996, the heads of mission have been high commissioners.

== Heads of mission ==
=== Ambassadors ===
- 1975–1979: John Lewen
- 1979–1980: Achilles Papadopoulos
- 1980–1984: John Stewart
- 1984–1985: Eric Vines
- 1986–1989: James Allan
- 1989–1992: Maeve Fort
- 1992–1995: Richard Edis

=== High commissioners ===
- 1996–2000: Bernard Everett
- 2000–2003: Robert Dewar
- 2003–2007: Howard Parkinson
- 2007–2010: Andrew Soper
- 2010–2014: Shaun Cleary
- 2014–2018: Joanna Kuenssberg
- 2018–2022: NneNne Iwuji-Eme
- 2022–present: Helen Lewis
