= Thomas Arthur Munro =

Scottish physician and psychologist

Dr Thomas Arthur Munro FRSE FRCPE (1 October 1905 – 18 December 1966) was a 20th-century Scottish physician and psychologist. He was a joint founder of the Indian Psychiatric Society. In authorship he usually appears as T. A. Munro.

== Life ==
Munro was born on 1 October 1905 in Calcutta in India while his father, Thomas M. Munro, was involved in the survey of the Hooghly River. His mother was the daughter of John Horne.

The family returned to their native city of Edinburgh around 1919, probably living in John Horne's house in the Blackhall district. Thomas attended Edinburgh Academy 1920 to 1923 then studied medicine at the University of Edinburgh graduating in 1928 with an MBChB. In 1933 he joined the staff of the Royal Edinburgh Hospital.

In the Second World War he was posted to India and Burma as a psychiatrist, with the rank of Brigadier. In 1946 he was a joint founder of the Indian Psychiatric Society. After the war he went to Guy's Hospital in London then to Bethlem Royal Hospital (Bedlam) and the Maudsley Hospital, specialising in mental care. In 1955 he returned to Edinburgh as Physician Superintendent of the Edinburgh Royal Asylum. Here he replaced Dr David Kennedy Henderson who had retired.

In 1939 he was elected a Fellow of the Royal College of Physicians of Edinburgh. In 1958 he was elected a member of the Harveian Society of Edinburgh.

In 1959 he was elected a Fellow of the Royal Society of Edinburgh. His proposers were Sir Alexander Biggan, Douglas Guthrie, Sir Alexander Gray, Archibald Gordon MacGregor and John Gaddum.

He died suddenly on 18 December 1966.

== Family ==
In 1935 he married Kathleen Carlton.

== Publications ==
- Familial Psychoses Associated with Endocrine Disorder (1937)
- Consanguinity and Mental Disorder (1938)
