= Laura Kuenssberg =

Scottish journalist (born 1976)

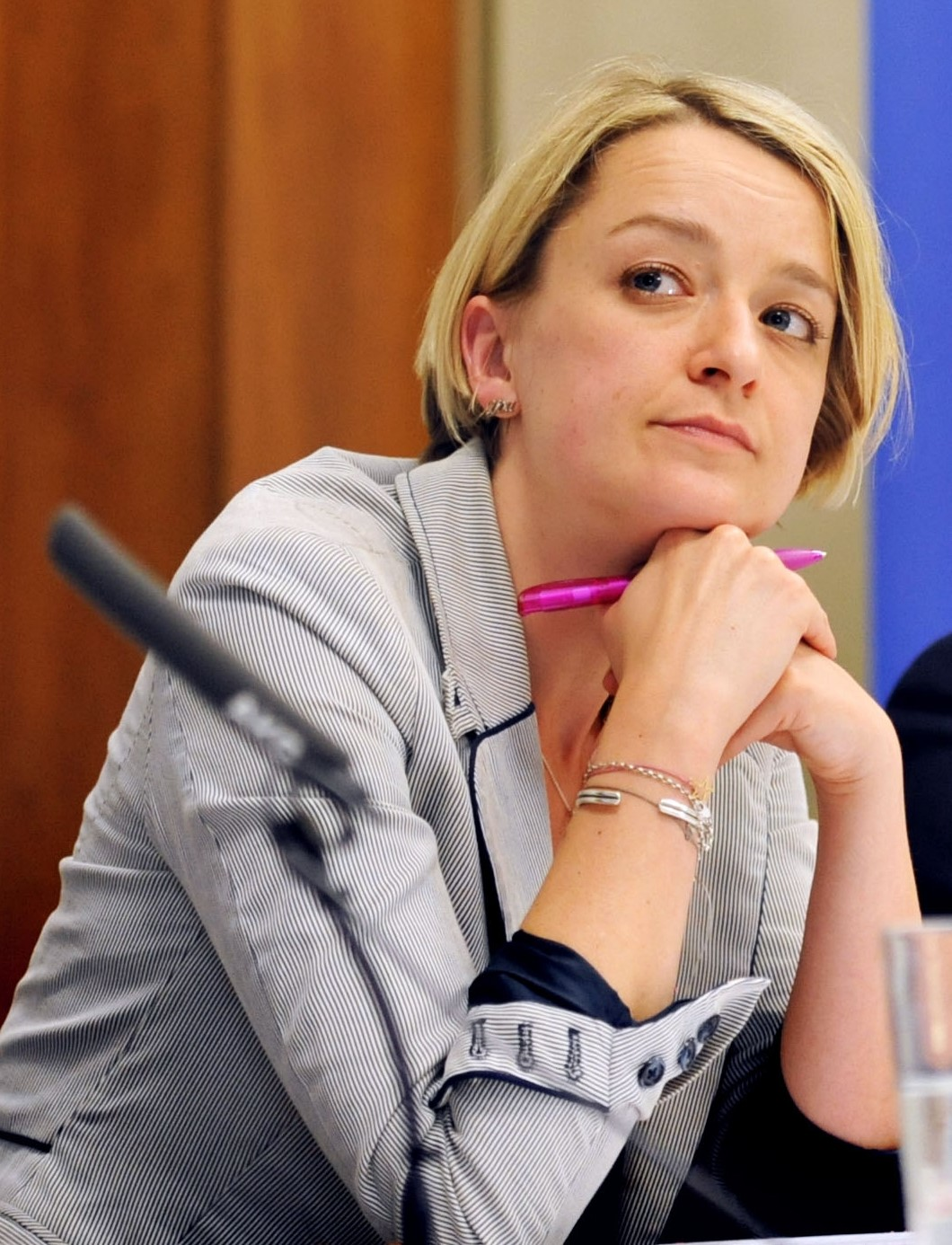
- Kuenssberg in 2012
- Born: Laura Juliet Kuenssberg; 8 August 1976 (age 50); Rome, Italy
- Education: University of Edinburgh (MA)
- Occupation: Journalist
- Notable work: BBC News, Newsnight, Brexitcast, Sunday with Laura Kuenssberg
- Title: Political editor of BBC News (2015–2022)
- Spouse: James Kelly (m. 2017)
- Relatives: Joanna Kuenssberg (sister); Ekkehard von Kuenssberg (paternal grandfather); Lord Robertson (maternal grandfather); Sir James Wilson Robertson (great-uncle)

Laura Juliet Kuenssberg (born 8 August 1976) is a Scottish journalist and television presenter. She was the political editor of BBC News from 2015 to 2022, and was the first woman to hold the position. She has since presented the BBC's weekend political discussion programme Sunday with Laura Kuenssberg.

Kuenssberg previously served as the BBC's chief political correspondent and was the first business editor of ITV News. She was also the chief correspondent for Newsnight between February 2014 and July 2015.

== Early life and education ==
Laura Juliet Kuenssberg was born in Rome, Italy, on 8 August 1976 to Scottish parents Nick and Sally Kuenssberg. She grew up in Kelvinside, Glasgow, with her brother and sister, and attended Laurel Bank School before going on to study history at the University of Edinburgh, where she graduated with a first-class honours degree and an MA. During her degree she spent a year studying at Georgetown University in Washington, D.C., U.S., where she interned at NBC.

Her Edinburgh-born father, Nick Kuenssberg, was a businessman, investor and academic; and her mother, Sally Kuenssberg, worked in children's services and received an OBE for this in the 2000 New Year Honours. Her paternal grandfather was German-born Ekkehard von Kuenssberg (CBE), a co-founder and president of the Royal College of General Practitioners. Her maternal grandfather was Lord Robertson, a judge of the Scots High Court of Justiciary, whose brother James Wilson Robertson was the last British Governor-General of Nigeria. Her elder sister, Joanna Kuenssberg, is an oil executive for Shell and a former diplomat who has served as high commissioner to Mozambique.

== Career ==
Kuenssberg won the regional Royal Television Society "Most Promising Newcomer" award in 2001 while working as home affairs correspondent for BBC North East and Cumbria.

In 2009, she was appointed chief political correspondent for the BBC. Kuenssberg reported for BBC One bulletins, Daily Politics and the BBC News channel. In May 2010, her presence on BBC Television was so ubiquitous in the period between the 2010 United Kingdom general election and the formation of the Cameron–Clegg coalition that journalist David Aaronovitch coined the term "Kuenssbergovision".

Kuenssberg took up the newly created role of business editor for ITV News. She also contributed towards business reporting on ITV's current affairs strand, Tonight.

On 12 November 2013, it was announced that she would leave ITV to return to the BBC as chief correspondent and a presenter of Newsnight, replacing Gavin Esler in the latter role. She joined the Newsnight team in February 2014.

Between the 2017 United Kingdom general election and Brexit in 2020, Kuenssberg also co-presented the BBC's Brexitcast podcast alongside Katya Adler, Adam Fleming and Chris Mason, which was then retitled as the Newscast podcast.

In September 2023, Kuenssberg presented Laura Kuenssberg: State of Chaos; a three-part political documentary series, which was broadcast on BBC2.

Kuenssberg was the host of the BBC's election-night coverage for the 2024 United Kingdom general election alongside Clive Myrie.

=== BBC political editor ===
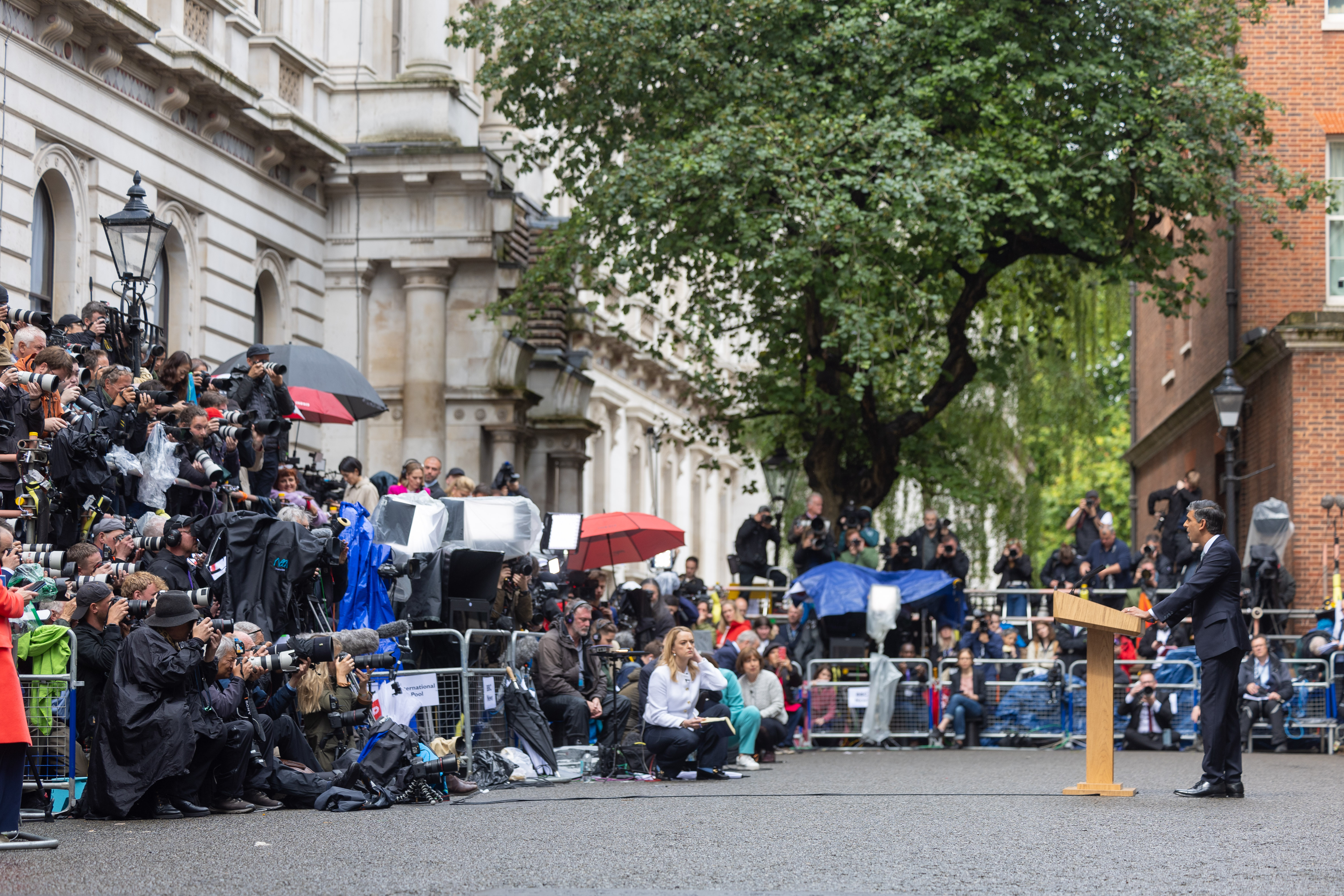
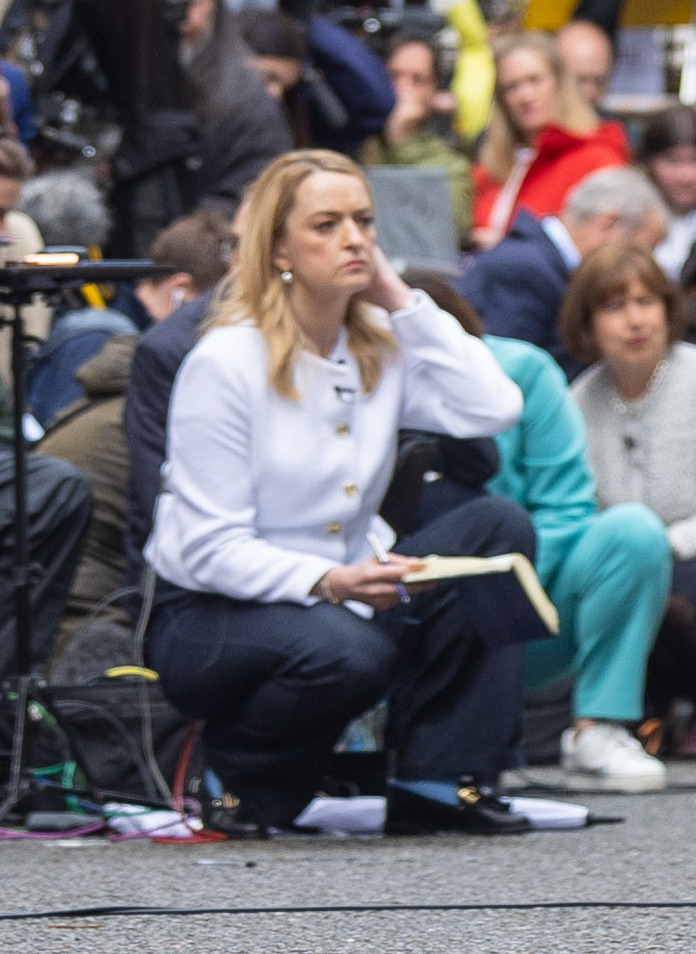
Kuenssberg listening to Rishi Sunak's final speech as prime minister, while covering the 2024 general election for the BBC (left: full photo; right: detail)

In July 2015, Kuenssberg was appointed the BBC's political editor, becoming the first woman to hold the position. In January 2016, she was involved in arranging for the Labour MP Stephen Doughty to publicly announce his resignation as a shadow foreign office minister on Daily Politics. The incident was the subject of an official complaint from Seumas Milne, the Labour Party's director of communications, which was rejected by Robbie Gibb, then the BBC's head of live political programmes.

In December 2016, Kuenssberg said a source had told her that the Queen had made comments supportive of leaving the European Union during a private lunch at Windsor Castle. She initially decided not to report the comments because the BBC generally requires a story to have two sources before it can run.

During a joint press conference with the prime minister Theresa May and Donald Trump, when the latter was in his first term as president of the United States, Kuenssberg recalled a number of controversial statements Trump had made about his proposed travel ban during the 2016 United States presidential election, asking Trump if he had anything to say to British viewers "worried about you becoming the leader of the free world?" Trump responded, "That's your choice of a question?" He then remarked to May: "There goes that relationship."

In March 2019, Kuenssberg presented a documentary, The Brexit Storm: Laura Kuenssberg's Inside Story, for BBC Two. Her role in the reporting of Brexit negotiations was the subject of an article in The Times Magazine of 30 March 2019.

On Wednesday, 11 December 2019, while reporting on the 2019 United Kingdom general election, Kuenssberg was accused of breaking electoral law by stating that postal ballots painted a "grim" picture for Labour. The reporter told viewers that day that while parties were not supposed to look at voting papers when they were verified – but not counted – at opening sessions, they did "get a hint" of how they were doing and it was not looking good for Labour. The accusation made was that the Representation of the People Act 1983 had been broken, as it lays out that "no person shall, in the case of an election to which this section applies, publish before the poll is closed [...] any statement relating to the way in which voters have voted at the election where that statement is (or might reasonably be taken to be) based on information given by voters after they have voted, or b) any forecast as to the result of the election which is (or might reasonably be taken to be) based on information so given." The BBC, though, denied that Kuenssberg had violated the law. Ultimately Kuenssberg was in fact cleared of all wrongdoing.

On 17 December 2019, she presented a second documentary film, The Brexit Storm Continues: Laura Kuenssberg's Inside Story, which covered Boris Johnson's arrival at 10 Downing Street through to the 2019 general election.

On 20 December 2021, Kuenssberg announced that she would be stepping down as political editor, effective in the spring of 2022, to take "a senior presenting and reporting role" at the BBC. The Guardian reported that she was in talks to become a presenter on the Today programme on BBC Radio 4. It was suggested that Jon Sopel could take over the role of political editor in her place, leaving his role as the BBC's North America editor, but in February 2022 he left the BBC to join LBC. In the event Chris Mason was announced to be the next BBC political editor.

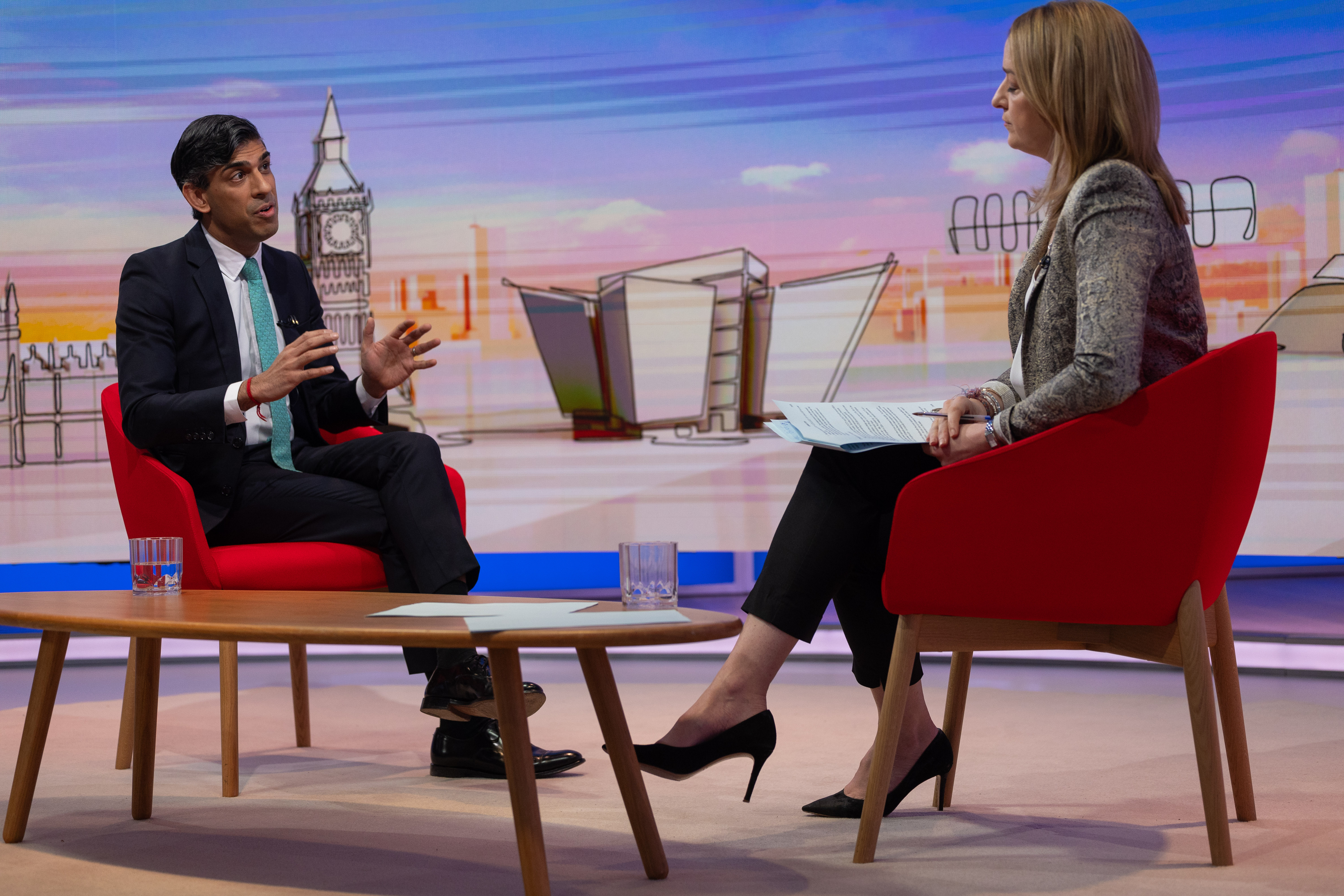
Kuenssberg interviewing Rishi Sunak on Sunday with Laura Kuenssberg

In March 2022, it was announced that Kuenssberg would be replacing Andrew Marr, in a full-time role, as the host of BBC One's flagship Sunday morning politics show, Sunday with Laura Kuenssberg, starting in September 2022.

== Criticism ==
=== Accusations of bias ===
Following the 2016 local elections, a petition was started on 38 Degrees accusing Kuenssberg of being biased against the Labour Party and its leader Jeremy Corbyn. The group called for her dismissal. The petition was later withdrawn by David Babbs, executive director of 38 Degrees, who said it had become a "focal point for sexist and hateful abuse made towards Laura Kuenssberg" on other social media websites such as Twitter, although he said that this represented "the actions of a small minority".

In January 2017, the BBC Trust ruled that a report in November 2015 by Kuenssberg broke the broadcaster's impartiality and accuracy guidelines. A viewer had complained about her item, which featured an interview with Corbyn on the BBC News at Six which gave the incorrect impression that Corbyn disagreed with the use of firearms by police in incidents such as that month's terrorist attacks in Paris. His purported answer to a question as broadcast in the report was in fact his reply to a more general question (not broadcast), and not specifically about that terrorist attack. The BBC Trust said that the inaccuracy was "compounded" when Kuenssberg went on to state that Corbyn's message "couldn't be more different" from that of May, who was about to publish anti-terrorism proposals. The trust said that accuracy was particularly important when dealing "with a critical question at a time of extreme national concern". The BBC Trust found no evidence that there had been any intention to mislead, and their ruling was that the footage "had been compiled in good faith". The Daily Telegraph published a story about Kuenssberg in 2017 with the headline "the most divisive woman on TV today?" printed on the front-page.

In September 2019, Kuenssberg was criticised for her portrayal of Omar Salem, a father who confronted the prime minister, Boris Johnson, about the government's treatment of the NHS, as "a Labour activist". Salem defended Kuenssberg, saying that she was doing her job "without fear or favour which is a vital part of democracy. I don't think 'Labour activist cares about NHS' is a huge scoop though..."

On 11 December 2019, the day before the general election, Kuenssberg drew controversy by claiming on air that submitted postal votes, apparently viewed by both the Labour Party and the Conservative Party, were "looking pretty grim for Labour in a lot of parts of the country". Viewing postal votes prior to polling day is in breach of guidelines set by the Electoral Commission and predicting electoral outcomes based on votes cast prior to polls closing may be a criminal offence. The footage was subsequently withdrawn from BBC iPlayer, while the episode of Politics Live in which the incident happened was withdrawn and removed from the BBC Parliament schedule. The BBC News press office tweeted: "Regarding today's Politics Live programme, the BBC does not believe it, or its political editor, has breached electoral law." The Metropolitan Police later said that there was "no evidence of any criminal offences having been committed".

Kuenssberg was one of several journalists who reported, without verification, that a Labour activist had punched a Conservative Party advisor. Footage released later showed that the story was untrue. Kuenssberg then apologised and retracted her original tweet. On 3 March 2020, the BBC's Executive Complaints Unit stated that "It found no evidence of political bias nor that Laura Kuenssberg had failed to check the story before publication." In her apology, Kuenssberg said that it was only after two sources had told her the story was true that she had initially published it.

In May 2020, as the Dominic Cummings scandal broke, Kuenssberg tweeted several statements from an anonymous source close to Cummings about the nature of his trip. In one tweet, she contradicted Pippa Crerar, one of the journalists who broke the story, with information from a "source" which argued that the trip was not illegal. Many suspected that the anonymous source was Cummings himself, which led to allegations that Kuenssberg was defending, or at least uncritically repeating, his side of the story. This led to a significant volume of complaints to the BBC, which defended Kuenssberg's actions. In May 2021, Dominic Cummings confirmed to a Parliamentary committee that he "set the record straight" with briefings to Kuenssberg. In 2022, Patrick Howse, a former BBC reporter and producer, described this as part of a pattern where "Access was crucial" which allowed "lies" to be "amplified and given credibility by Britain's state broadcaster".

In November 2020, some economists criticised Kuenssberg's assessment of Rishi Sunak's economic statement, suggesting she lacked understanding of economics. The BBC defended Kuenssberg, stating that she was summarising the position of the Chancellor and that its economics editor, Faisal Islam, had then given the opposite position.

=== Bodyguard ===
In a July 2017 Spectator article, Charles Moore wrote of being told "informally" that Kuenssberg had received protection by a bodyguard during the 2017 general election. The BBC had believed her safety was under threat because of online abuse considered to be mainly from supporters of Jeremy Corbyn. The BBC refused to comment about the story. The Labour politician Yvette Cooper defended the BBC's political editor: "It's her job to ask difficult questions. It's her job to be sceptical about everything we say". By the end of the campaign, Kuenssberg also received online abuse by some Conservative and UKIP supporters.

At both the Conservative and Labour Party conferences in 2017, Kuenssberg was accompanied by a security guard. Journalist Jenni Russell, a former BBC editor herself, was quoted in The New York Times about the issue affecting Kuenssberg: "The graphic level of threats to women is quite extraordinary and it's one of the worst things to have happened in recent British public life."

At a November 2017 gathering in London, Kuenssberg said that internet trolls were attempting to silence her.

== Awards ==
In November 2016, Kuenssberg was awarded Broadcaster of the Year by the Political Studies Association. The prize was in recognition of her contribution to the public understanding of politics, especially surrounding the June 2016 EU Referendum and subsequent developments.

At the British Journalism Awards organised by Press Gazette in December 2016, Kuenssberg received the Journalist of the Year award. "Kuenssberg deserves this prize for the sheer volume and scope of reporting on some of the biggest changes ever in British politics" said the judges, pointing especially to her coverage of the EU membership referendum and its aftermath.

Kuenssberg was named in the Evening Standard's 2019 list of the top 20 'most influential Londoners'.

== Personal life ==
Kuenssberg is married to James Kelly, a management consultant.

Media offices
Preceded by None	Business Editor: ITV News; 2011–2013	Succeeded by Joel Hills
Preceded by James Landale	Chief Political Correspondent: BBC News; 2009–2011	Succeeded by Norman Smith
Preceded by Nick Robinson	Political Editor: BBC News; 2015–2022	Succeeded by Chris Mason
Preceded by Huw Edwards as host until 2019	Host of BBC Election Night Coverage; 2024–present	Incumbent
