= Ekkehard von Kuenssberg =

German-British physician (1913–2000)

- Born: 17 December 1913; Heidelberg, Germany
- Died: 27 December 2000 (aged 87); Haddington, East Lothian, Scotland
- Occupation: Physician

Ekkehard von Kuenssberg CBE (German: [ˈɛkəhaʁt fɔn ˈkʏnsbɛʁk]; 17 December 1913 – 27 December 2000) was a German-born physician who made his career in Scotland. He was chairman and later president of the Royal College of General Practitioners and was appointed as its Wolfson Travelling Professor.

== Early life ==
Kuenssberg was the son of Eberhard von Kuenssberg, a professor who taught law at the University of Heidelberg, and Katharina von Kuenssberg, a biologist. Kuenssberg's German ancestry could be traced to the reign of Charlemagne. His mother was the daughter of Gustav Samson, owner of a large cloth mill in Cottbus, and Anna Goldschmidt, whose family was of Jewish origin.

He was educated at Schloss Salem, Baden, under the headship of Kurt Hahn, and then at the University of Innsbruck in Austria. At Salem, he heard an organ recital by Albert Schweitzer, which he later said inspired him to take up the career of medicine. As a student, he was an enthusiast for skiing, field hockey, and mountaineering in the Alps.

In 1933, Kuenssberg turned down an invitation to join the SS and migrated to Britain, in the guise of a sports student, carrying a hockey stick and a tennis racquet. For a time he worked as a laboratory assistant at the University of Cambridge, from where he applied to several medical schools. He was accepted by the University of Edinburgh Medical School, from which he graduated in 1939, having also played hockey for the university and founded the Edinburgh University Ski Club.

== Career ==
At the time of his graduation, being a German in Britain limited the medical work Kuenssberg could take on, and in May 1940, with the ending of the Phoney War, he was interned and held until October. After his release, he became a locum in Granton, Edinburgh for the patients of Dr Charles Munro, who was away on military service. His work there included midwifery.

In February 1944, Kuenssberg was commissioned into the Royal Army Medical Corps, but for his wartime military service he changed his name to Edgar Valentine Kingsley. He remained in uniform for two years, becoming assistant to the Director of Hygiene in British East Africa and rising to the rank of lieutenant colonel. In 1946, he went back to Granton, entering into a partnership with Munro. The work of a general practitioner was significantly changed by the establishment of the National Health Service in 1948.

Kuenssberg sought to influence the development of primary care. Active in the British Medical Association, he was elected as chairman of its Scottish General Medical Services Committee, and in that role was one of four physicians who in the mid-1960s spent two years negotiating a new "GP Charter" with Kenneth Robinson, the minister of health in the Labour government of Harold Wilson. This made revolutionary changes in general practice. During the two years, Kuenssberg made many trips to London by British Rail sleeper and on occasions flew back to Edinburgh for an evening surgery. For this work he was appointed a Commander of the Order of the British Empire (CBE) in the 1969 Birthday Honours.

He was also active in the work of the Royal College of General Practitioners, which he joined when it was first established in 1952, becoming its chairman and later its president. In these roles he visited Australia, New Zealand, Canada, the United States, South Africa, parts of the Middle East, and some other European countries. One of his achievements was to persuade colleagues to trial oral contraceptives.

Before the disastrous side-effects of thalidomide on the unborn child became clear, Kuenssberg, with Doctors Simpson and Stanton of the Northern General Hospital, pointed out some disorders in patients who were taking the drug. He was later appointed to the Dunlop committee, which was the first such formal investigation of the safety of drugs, sitting as its only GP member. Kuenssberg also conceived the "Care Committee", a local body including councillors, social workers, and a general practitioner, to consider how to address the social problems of an area of deprivation. He also served as an advisor to the Queen's Nursing Institute, which later created a scholarship in his name.

An obituary said of Kuenssberg:

He... had the gift of the quick and pithy remark that would put a problem into perspective. He had an almost intuitive diagnostic ability. He showed immense kindness, concern, and gave practical help at all hours. He epitomised the caritas of the college motto. (Note: The motto of the Royal College of General Practitioners is Cum Scientia Caritas "Compassion with Knowledge".)

== Private life ==
In 1941, Kuenssberg married Constance Hardy, with whom he had been a medical student at Edinburgh. They lived at Canonmills and had two sons and two daughters. They later moved out of the city to Haddington, East Lothian. In retirement, Kuenssberg suffered from Parkinson's disease and cancer. He died in 2000, aged 87.

In 1940, Kuenssberg’s mother was living in Heidelberg and was registered as Jewish. His father died in Germany in 1941, and his mother then lived at Finstergrün Castle until the end of the war. She survived her husband until 1977, reaching the age of 94.

One of Kuenssberg's sons is Professor Nick Kuenssberg OBE, whose children include the diplomat Joanna Kuenssberg, a former High Commissioner to Mozambique, and Laura Kuenssberg, former political editor of BBC News.

== Honours ==
- Commander of the Order of the British Empire, 1969 Birthday Honours
- Fellow of the Royal College of Physicians of Edinburgh
- Fellow of the Royal College of Obstetricians and Gynaecologists
- Fellow of the Royal College of General Practitioners
- Wolfson Travelling Professor of the Royal College of General Practitioners
- Hippocrates Medallist, International Society for General Practice, October 1974
- President, Royal College of General Practitioners, 1976–1979
