= Katya Adler =

British journalist

- Born: Michal Katya Adler; 3 May 1972 (age 54); London, England
- Education: University of Bristol
- Employer: BBC
- Notable work: Brexitcast
- Title: Europe editor of BBC News (2014–present)
- Children: 3

Michal Katya Adler (born 3 May 1972) is a British journalist. She has been the BBC's Europe editor since 2014.

== Early life ==
Adler was born on 3 May 1972 in Hampstead, north London, to German-Jewish émigrés parents. She and her brother both spoke English at home, while their parents would converse privately in German. She was educated at the independent, fee-paying South Hampstead High School.

She attended the University of Bristol where she studied German and Italian, and was the president of a political society where she started its magazine.

Adler graduated in June 1995. One of her dissertation topics was denazification for which she interviewed Nazi hunter Simon Wiesenthal.

In August 1995, Adler began working for FUNtastic Show on Blue Danube Radio, in Vienna. In her earlier German and Italian language studies year abroad, she had had work placements with Reuters, NBC in Turkey, and at the Rome offices of The Times.

== Career ==
After graduating, Adler initially briefly worked for The Times before moving to Vienna in August 1995 to work for Mondial Congress & Events, a destination management company and professional conference organiser.

In late 1995, she began working as a correspondent for Austrian national public broadcaster ORF reporting locally and then internationally from Kosovo, Eastern Europe and across Southwest Asia and North Africa.

Adler joined the BBC in Vienna in 1998, reporting on Austrian and Central European affairs. After becoming the BBC's Berlin correspondent for a short period, from 2000 she was based in London for the BBC World Service; she presented on European current affairs, and commuted weekly to Berlin to work as a news anchor for Deutsche Welle Television.

From August 2003, she was the BBC Madrid correspondent, travelling around Europe, Southwest Asia and North Africa to cover stories including the death of Pope John Paul II and Palestinian leader Yasser Arafat's death in a Paris hospital. Adler also reported on the 2004 Madrid train bombings. She admitted in an interview in 2019 that she had lied about being able to speak Spanish to get the Madrid correspondent job. Adler later learned the language by listening to Spanish political radio and Mexican soap operas.

From December 2006 Adler was the BBC's Middle East correspondent, based in Jerusalem but reporting around the region from Gaza, the West Bank, Lebanon, Syria, Jordan and Libya. During this period she was also an occasional presenter or interviewer on HARDtalk.

Adler has also presented a number of one-hour documentaries, such as Mexico's Drug Wars for BBC Two. Her film Spain's Stolen Babies was runner-up for an Royal Television Society (RTS) award in 2012.

At the end of April 2014 she was appointed the BBC's Europe editor, replacing Gavin Hewitt. Her appointment was controversial because her LinkedIn profile stated that for 15 years she had regularly facilitated conferences for a number of clients including one for the European Union. This brought about criticism from Conservative Party MPs, including Andrew Bridgen and Philip Davies. Davies stated: "this cosy relationship between the BBC and the European Commission severely undermines your editorial integrity and ability to report matters in a strictly objective manner." The BBC in written response clarified that Adler had at the time been working freelance for the BBC and a number of other broadcast organisations, and in 19 years had only been paid to chair one EU event in 2005, invited by the UK presidency, not the European Commission.

In early February 2017, the BBC broadcast a documentary by Adler titled After Brexit: the Battle for Europe in which she examined the mounting challenges facing the European Union over the next few years. In June 2017 Adler became one of the four presenters of Brexitcast, a BBC podcast covering Brexit. In September 2019, Brexit Newscast became a regular television broadcast fixture on BBC One, usually following Question Time, as of December 2020.

In January 2021, Katya Adler revealed the 21st-century meanings of Dante's Divine Comedy in a three-part radio series on the occasion of the 700th anniversary of the poet's death with three expert guides through Inferno (Margaret Kean, English Teacher at St Hilda's College, Oxford), Purgatorio (Matthew Treherne, Professor of Italian Literature at the University of Leeds), and Paradiso (Vittorio Montemaggi, St Edmund's College, Cambridge), and Michael Sheen as Dante.

As of 2019, Adler was paid between £205,000-£209,999, placing her on the list of the highest-paid BBC news and current affairs staff.

Although Adler is predominantly a news journalist, in July 2023, she started presenting the BBC Proms on television. Adler joined newsreaders Clive Myrie and Huw Edwards, plus former newsreader Katie Derham, in the presenting line-up.

In September 2023, Adler presented Living Next Door to Putin, a two-part documentary series that was aired on BBC One.

In November 2023, an interview by Adler with French President Emmanuel Macron aired on the BBC News channel.

In March 2026, Adler presented Europe on the Edge with Katya Adler; a three-part documentary series that was aired on BBC Two.

== Criticism of Michael Gove ==
In September 2020 the BBC partially upheld a complaint against Adler after she sent a series of tweets on 28 April 2020 stating that an "observation" put forward by Cabinet Office Minister Michael Gove was "delusional". Gove had stated "the COVID crisis, in some respects, should concentrate the minds of EU negotiators". In addition, Adler's analysis also altered Gove's words, changing the term "should" to "will" in her tweets. The BBC Editorial Complaint Unit ruled that although Adler backed up her opinion with detailed evidence and was entitled to state it, her use of the word "delusional" broke the guidelines' licence for "professional judgements, rooted in evidence".

== Awards ==
In July 2017, Adler was awarded an honorary LL.D from Bristol University and an honorary D.Lit from the University of London Institute in Paris. She was awarded the Charles Wheeler Award for Outstanding Contribution to Broadcast Journalism in 2019. She has also been awarded Broadcast Journalist of the Year 2018 at the PSA, Political Studies Association; Broadcast Journalist of the Year 2019 jointly with Laura Kuenssberg by the London Press Club; Listeners Choice Award at British Podcast awards 2019 for the Brexitcast podcast. In 2019 she was listed in the Evening Standard as one of London's most influential people, and by Politico magazine as one of Brussels top 20 most influential women in 2017.

== Personal life ==
Adler is married and has three children. She admits to having suffered from PTSD in the past, as a result of her war zone reporting. In addition to her native English, she is fluent in Spanish, German, Italian, and French, and speaks basic Arabic and Hebrew.

Media offices
Preceded by Gavin Hewitt	Europe Editor: BBC News; 2014–present	Incumbent
