= Ridley Plan =

Report on nationalised industries in the UK

The Ridley Plan (also known as the Ridley Report) was a 1977 report on the nationalised industries in the United Kingdom produced in the aftermath of Edward Heath government's being brought down by the 1973–74 coal strike. The Ridley Plan was drawn up by the right-wing Conservative MP Nicholas Ridley, a founding member of the Selsdon Group. In the report he proposed how the next Conservative government could fight, and defeat, a major strike in a nationalised industry. In Ridley's view, trade union power in the UK was negatively interfering with market forces, causing inflation, and therefore had to be checked to restore the "profitability" of the UK. He and others also saw it necessary to check union power in the aftermath of the fall of the Heath government.

Ridley suggested contingency planning to defeat any challenge from trade unions:

- The government should, if possible, choose the field of battle.
- Industries were grouped by the likelihood of winning a strike; the coal industry was in the 'middle' of three groups of industries mentioned.
- Coal stocks should be built up at power stations.
- Plans should be made to import coal from non-union foreign ports.
- Non-union lorry drivers to be recruited by haulage companies.
- Dual coal-oil firing generators to be installed, at extra cost.
- Cut off the money supply to the strikers and make the union finance them.
- Train and equip a large, mobile squad of police, ready to employ riot tactics in order to uphold the law against violent picketing.

These tactics were successfully employed by the Conservative government of Margaret Thatcher against the National Union of Mineworkers (NUM) during the miners' strike of 1984–85. Thatcher was strongly influenced by other Selsdon Group members besides Ridley, such as Norman Tebbit and Alan Walters. The report had been leaked six years earlier by The Economist and published on 27 May 1978, but the unions, especially the NUM, showed no interest in adapting or altering their own tactics in response.

== See also ==
- Battle of Orgreave
