= 1984 Islington nursery strike =

Labour dispute in London, England

The Islington nursery strike began on 16 April 1984, when 154 nursery workers employed by the London Borough of Islington began a period of indefinite strike action, in response to the council's refusal to accept their demands for a 20% increase in pay, improved staffing ratios, and 70 more staff. At the time, the nursery workers had a take-home pay of £85 per week. The strike lasted 15 weeks and closed all 12 of the social service run nurseries and day centres. It was led by the National and Local Government Officers' Association (NALGO) and the National Union of Public Employees (NUPE) against the local authority of Islington. Demonstrations were often held at Islington's Town Hall. The strike ended on 30 July and resulted in improved working conditions and staff-to-child ratios of 1:4. The 1984 Islington nursery strike was later the subject of a three-part audio documentary series, Nursery Workers Bite Back, produced by On the Record.

== Background ==
=== Unworkable conditions ===
In the early 1980s, Islington Council's Children's Day Centres were chronically understaffed. While the official staffing ratio was one worker to every four and a half children, the absence of cover for staff leave frequently resulted in individual workers being solely responsible for groups of twelve or more young children.

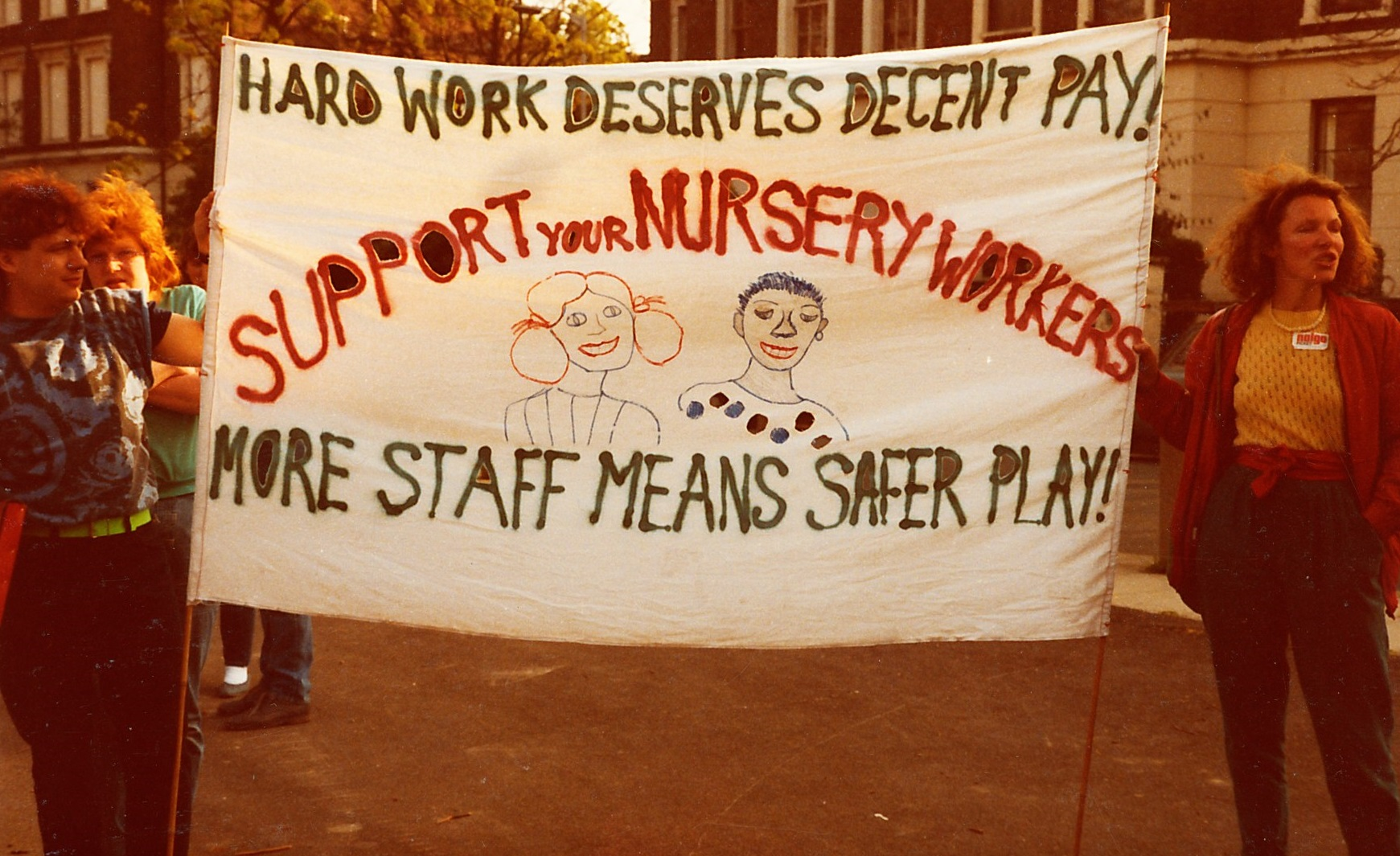
The Nursery Strikers setting off to march from Highbury House to Islington's Town Hall with a banner that reads "Hard Work Deserves Decent Pay, More Staff Means Safer Play"

=== NALGO claim ===
In October 1983, the National and Local Government Officers' Association (NALGO) submitted a claim calling for improved staff-to-child ratios, higher pay, a regrading of the pay structure, and the removal of the qualifications bar. Nursery workers stated these changes would be "an investment in our children's future".

== The Strike ==
=== Strike action begins ===
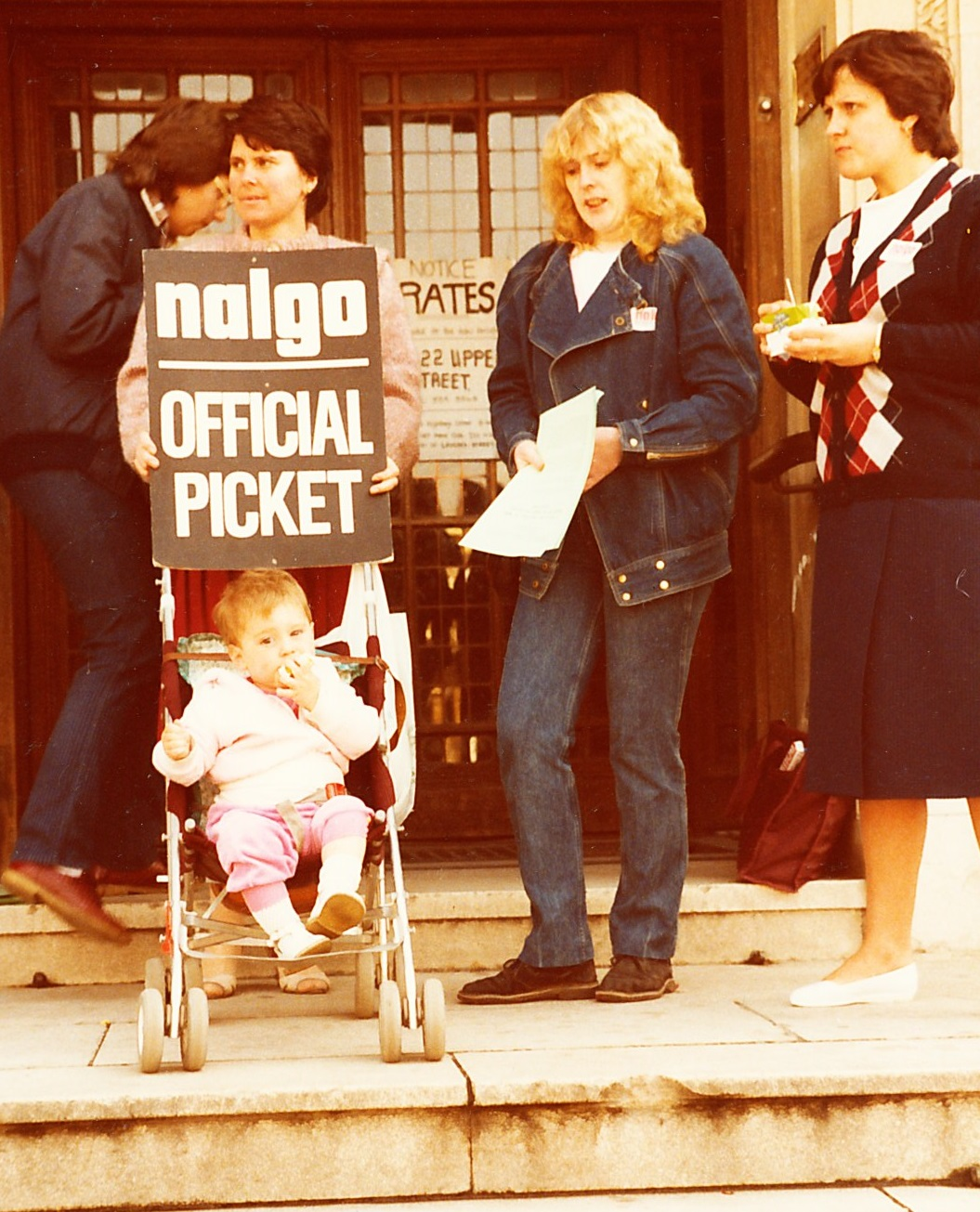
An official NALGO picket

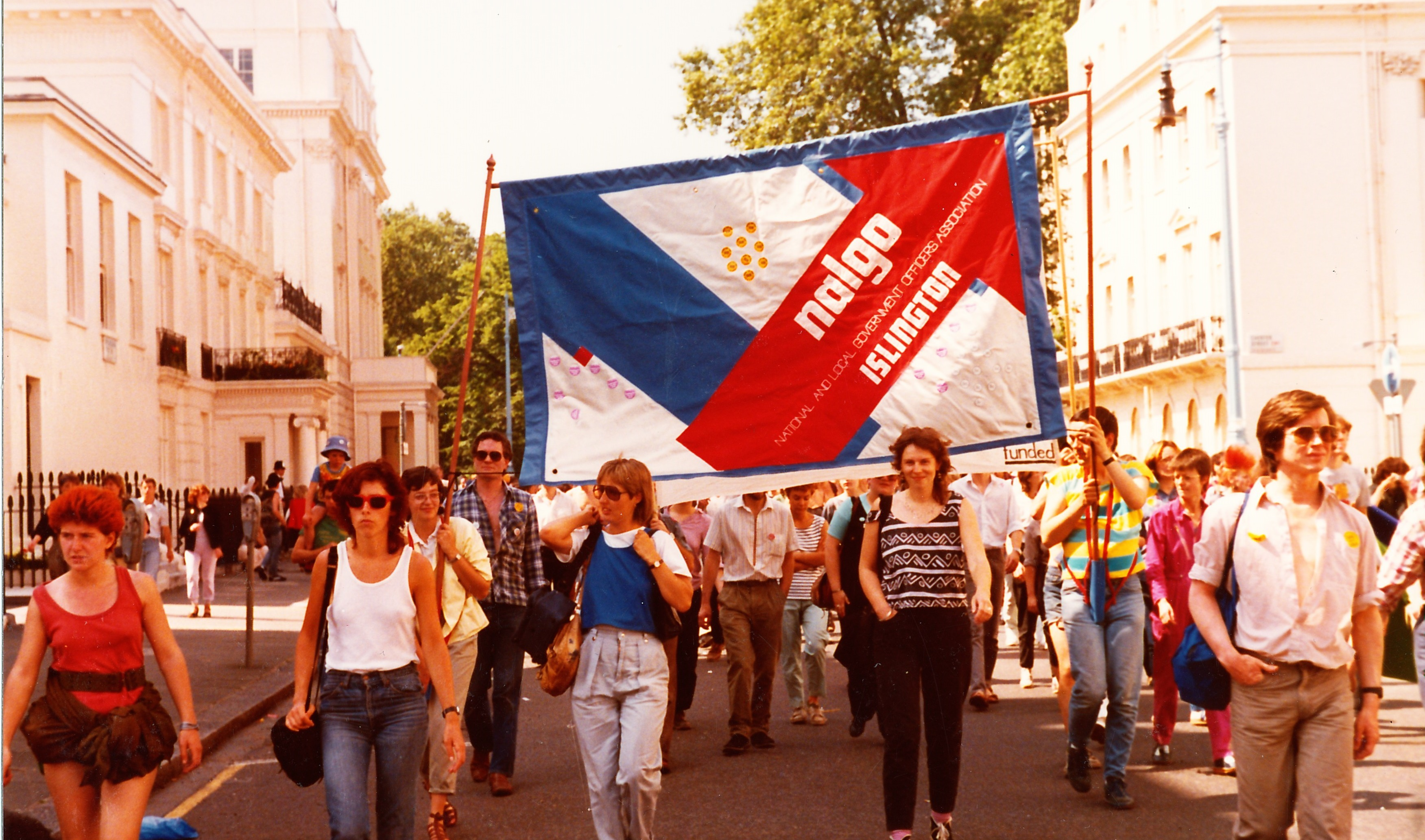
The Islington Nursery Strikers on a march in 1984

On 10 April 1984, a mass meeting was held and the nursery workers voted almost unanimously to strike on Monday 16 April 1984. In the Spare Rib, strikers described the difficult decision to strike, "those worst hit are not the council, who have consistently refused to take our demands seriously, but the women and children we service".

=== The Strike News ===
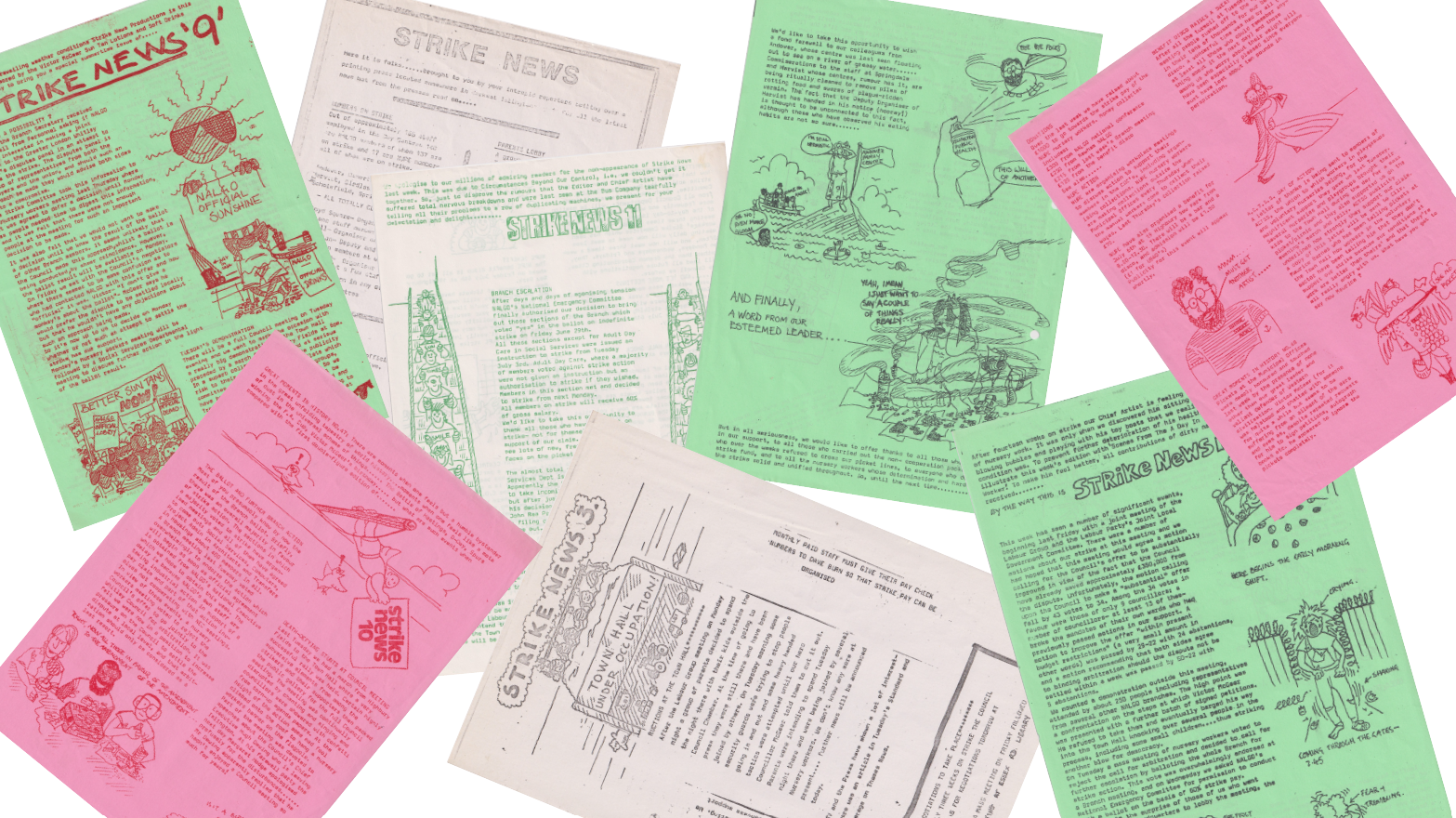
Examples of The Strike News

During the 1984 Islington Nursery Strike, strikers produced and distributed The Strike News once a week using a printing machine supplied by a community-run printmakers on Holloway Road.

=== Occupation of Islington Town Hall ===
At the end of April, a group of parents occupied Islington's Town Hall with their children by camping in the lobby, as reported in Strike News 3 and The Guardian newspaper.

=== Tea with the Miners' Wives ===
In early June, a delegation of miners' wives from Kent were invited to Islington Town Hall to meet the Mayor, Rosie Dale, as a gesture of support for the ongoing miners' strike. They refused to cross the nursery workers' picket line and so had tea with the Mayor, and the striking nursery workers, on the front steps of the hall instead.

=== Islington NALGO branch one-day strike ===
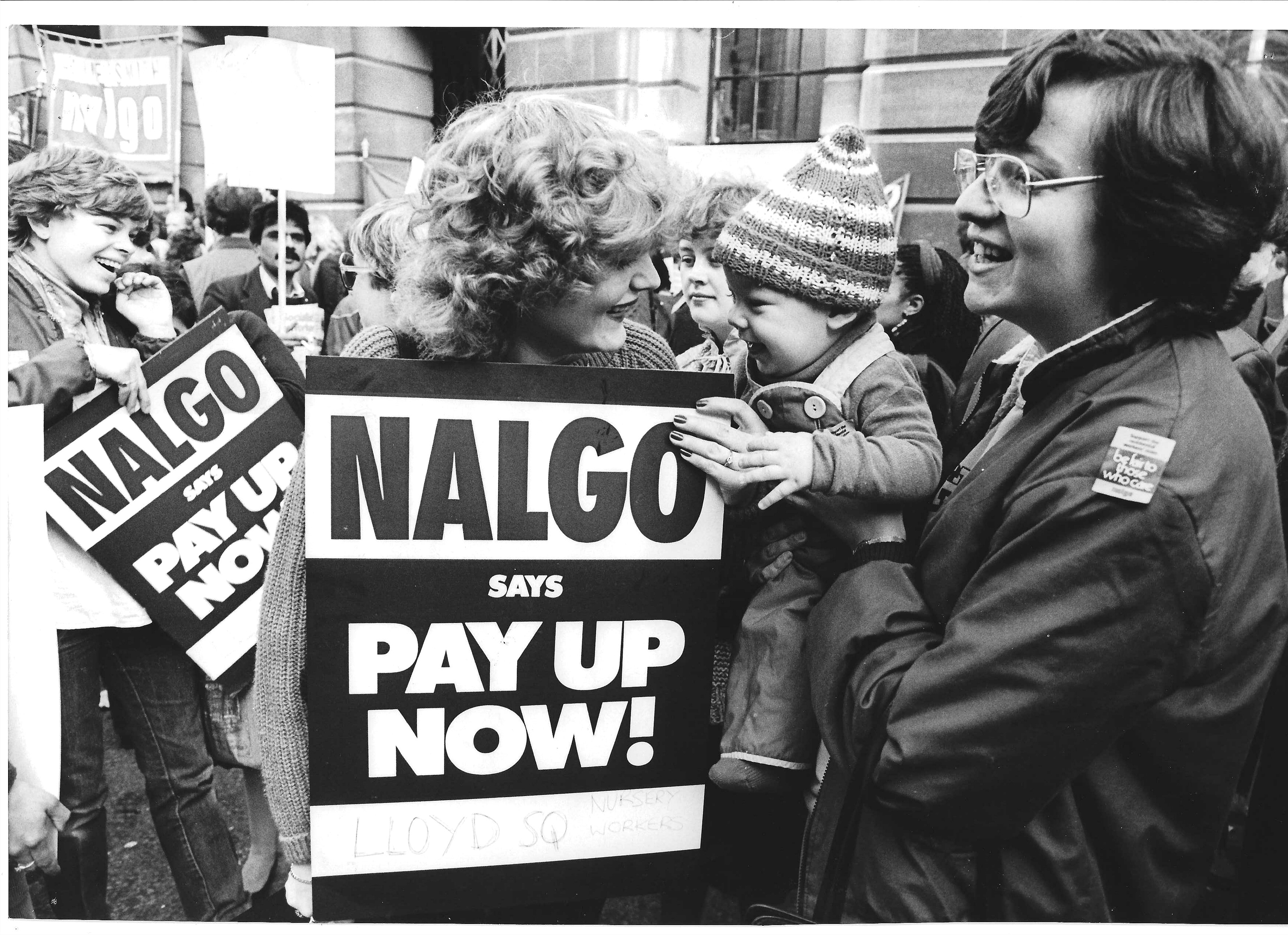
A NALGO picket with the Nursery Strikers and other Lloyd Square staff

On Monday 21 May, the Islington branch of the National and Local Government Officers' Association (NALGO), which had approximately 2,000 members, held a one-day strike.

=== Support from miners and Arthur Scargill ===
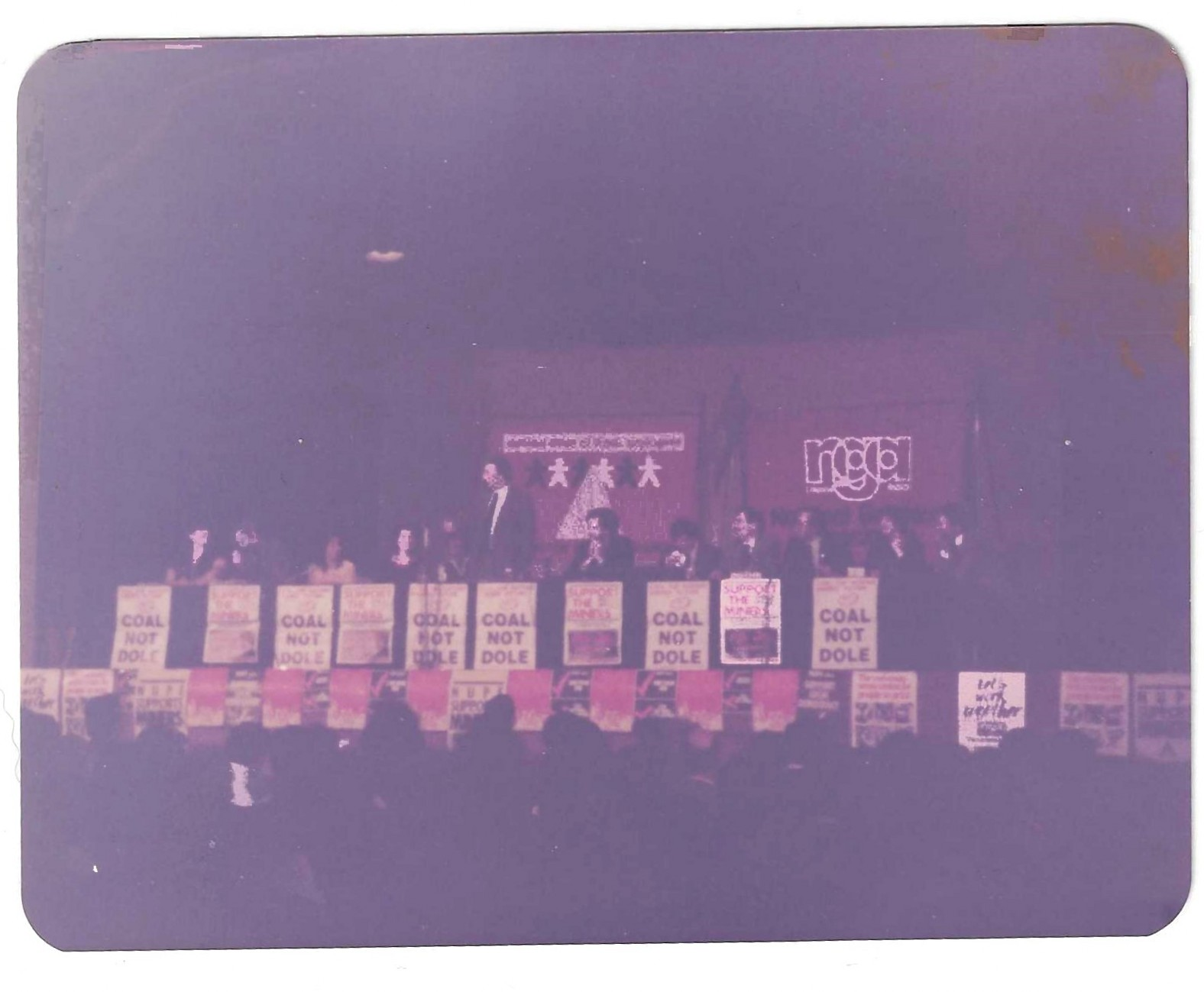
Arthur Scargill speaking at Islington's Town Hall alongside Nursery Striker Terry Conway

With support from the miners of the 1984–1985 United Kingdom miners' strike, in early June, the National Union of Public Employees (NUPE) and the National Graphical Association (NGA) invited Arthur Scargill, leader of the National Union of Mineworkers (NUM), to speak at Islington Town Hall in support of the strikers. During the event, one of the striking nursery workers, Terry Conway, addressed the audience about the ongoing dispute and Scargill signed a petition in support of the nursery workers.

=== Council meeting action ===
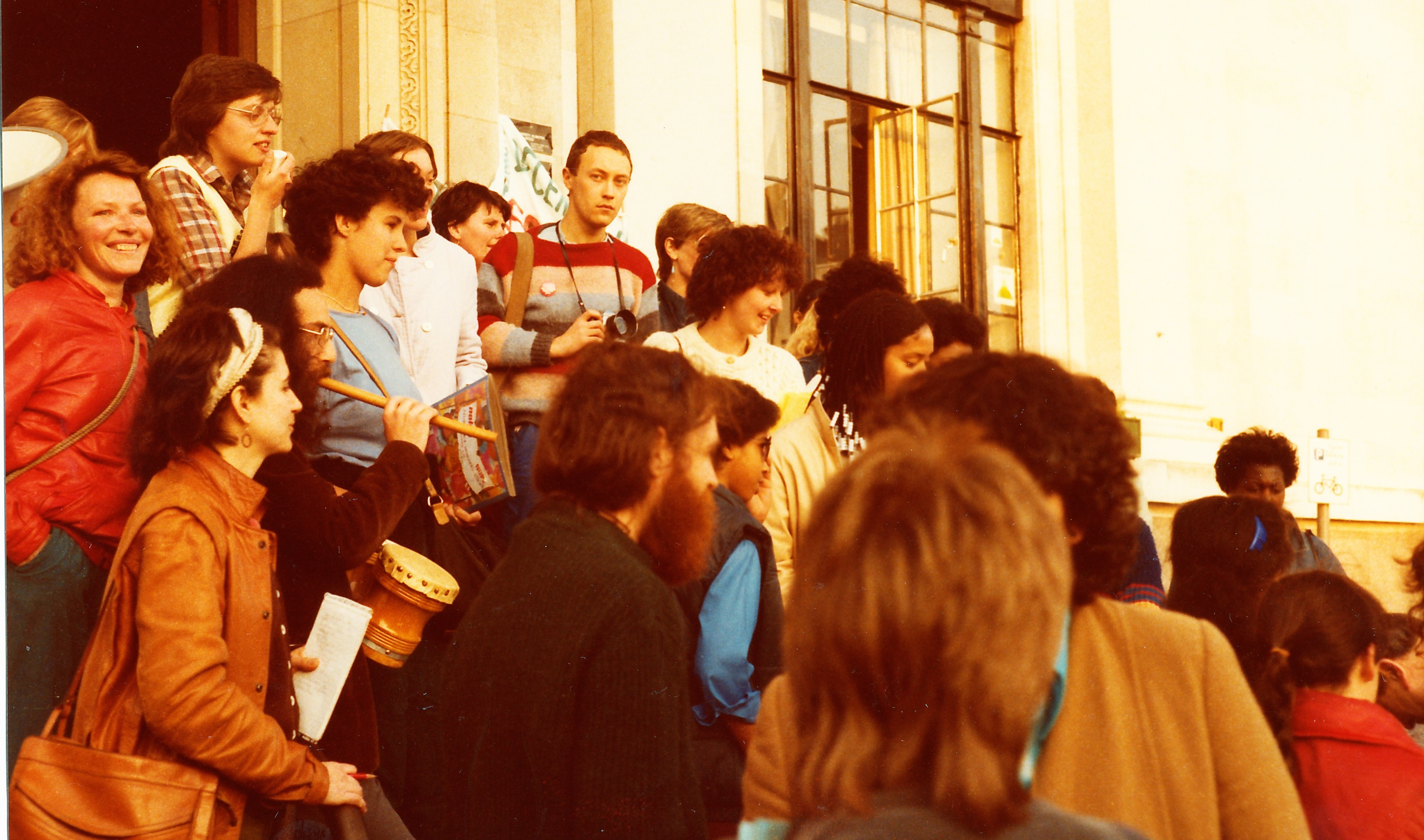
The Islington Nursery Strikers rallying outside of Islington's Town Hall at the end of a march from Highbury

On the evening of the 19 June, a large march of around 400 people was held from Highbury Fields to the Islington Town Hall, where a council meeting was taking place. Parents and nursery workers packed the public gallery and disrupted the meeting, while nursery workers climbed onto the roof and flew their banner from the town hall's flagpole.

=== NALGO escalation ===
400 council workers were called out on indefinite strike in support of the nursery workers from Tuesday 3 July.

The nursery workers called for a ballot of the entire NALGO branch which was successfully agreed upon by the NALGO national executive.

=== Resolution ===
By the end of July the strike was resolved and was the longest in Islington Council's history. The nursery workers had voted to accept the council's offer of 26 additional staff posts, deputy managers being made supernumery (meaning they were no longer counted in the ratios) removal of the qualification bar and recognition of a wider range of qualifications and a pay increase of £3 a week.

== Outcome ==
The strike ended without full demands being met but successes included:

- Qualification bar was abolished meaning workers without a qualification could proceed;
- Recognised qualifications broadened to include CQSW (Certificate of Qualification in Social Work), Advanced playgroup and nursery teachers certificate;
- Pay increase of £3 a week;
- 26 extra staff appointed, one extra per centre to replace Deputies who will become supernumerary.

=== Margaret Hodge controversy ===
Margaret Hodge, leader of Islington Council, came under criticism for advertising for a "Mothers' help" in The Lady magazine during the industrial action. In response to this, one of the strikers in The Daily Telegraph said "by refusing to meet our demands she is prolonging the strike and stopping Islington mothers having the use of nurseries for their children".

=== Events after the strike ===
A further industrial dispute involving nursery workers in Islington took place in 1989. This indefinite strike was prompted by the suspension of Children's Day Centre managers who had refused to apply an increased child-to-staff ratio of 8:1. As a result of the strike action the number of children in the nurseries increased by 11% rather than 27%
