= Miners' Strike: A Frontline Story =

TV documentary film about the UK miners strike

- Genre: Documentary
- Directed by: Ben Anthony
- Composer: Dominic de Grande
- Country of origin: United Kingdom

Production
- Running time: 88 minutes
- Production company: The Garden Productions

Original release
- Network: BBC Two
- Release: 2024

Miners' Strike: A Frontline Story is an 88-minute BBC Two documentary film about the 1984 UK miners' strike including the Battle of Orgreave. The film splices archive footage of the strikes, with stories from 15 individuals who were directly involved on the both sides of the events, including the miners and the police force. Several of the participants in the documentary were reciting their experiences for the first time in 40 years.

== Reception ==
Professional ratings
Review scores
Source	Rating
The Guardian	5/5 stars
The Times	5/5 stars
The Daily Telegraph	4/5 stars
Gazettely	9/10 stars

The documentary has received positive critical feedback. The Guardian awarded it 5 stars, and highlighted the impact of the film in particular how the voices of the miners had finally "been heard". The Times newspaper also gave 5 stars. Writing for the Daily Telegraph, Anita Singh gave the documentary 4 stars out of 5, and stated that "the raw, heartbreaking stories of families rendered helpless by the strike – and government – will stop you in your tracks".
