= Dan Johnson (journalist) =

English journalist and presenter

- Born: 1984 (age 41–42); Nottingham, Nottinghamshire, England
- Education: The Kingstone School; Barnsley College; University of Leeds; City, University of London
- Occupations: Journalist and presenter
- Known for: West & South West of England correspondent for BBC News

Dan Johnson (born c. 1984) is an English journalist and presenter, working as the West & South West of England correspondent for BBC News.

== Early life ==
Johnson, son of Graeme Johnson, was born in Nottingham, Nottinghamshire, and spent his formative years in Worsbrough.

== Career in journalism ==
Johnson began his career with the BBC in 2008 as a journalist for BBC Radio Sheffield, moving to television in 2011 when he joined the newsroom as a reporter for BBC Look North. His recent time at the BBC has been controversial. Johnson has been criticised for pursuing headline grabbing stories which are based on dubious sources. Media commentators have claimed that his research methods are impact driven, rather than evidence based. Mr. Justice Mann, in his judgement against the BBC, described Johnson as "capable of letting his enthusiasm for his story get the better of his complete regard for truth on occasions".

In 2022, it was announced Johnson would join BBC West as West & South West England Correspondent based in Bristol. In the same year he also travelled across Ukraine making a documentary called Locked Away: Ukraine’s Stolen Lives looking at the broken care system for disabled people and how it has got worse since Russia invaded.

=== Battle of Orgreave ===
In October 2012, Johnson investigated the events at the 1984 Battle of Orgreave, and the trials which arose from it, for BBC One regional news and current affairs programme, Inside Out: Yorkshire and Lincolnshire. The programme examined the evidence that senior officers with South Yorkshire Police (SYP) had conspired to co-ordinate statements to wrongly charge arrested miners with riot, an offence which at the time carried a punishment of life imprisonment. Following the broadcast, shadow home secretary Yvette Cooper told the House of Commons that the issue needed to be investigated, and SYP referred itself to the Independent Police Complaints Commission (IPCC). The subsequent IPCC investigation concluded that there was "evidence of excessive violence by police officers, a false narrative from police exaggerating violence by miners, perjury by officers giving evidence to prosecute the arrested men, and an apparent coverup of that perjury by senior officers."

Previously, Johnson had been the principal researcher for David Hencke and Francis Beckett's Marching to the Fault Line: The Miners' Strike and the Battle for Industrial Britain (2009).

=== Cliff Richard property search ===
In July 2014, Johnson was alerted by a source that Cliff Richard was being covertly investigated by South Yorkshire Police (SYP) over an alleged historical offence of sexual assault. On 14 July, he contacted Carrie Goodwin, SYP's communications director, and detailed the information he had received. Chief Constable David Crompton said: "We were placed in a very difficult position because of the original leak and the BBC came to us knowing everything that we knew, as far as the investigation was concerned."

Contrary to established procedures, under which Johnson's disclosure of the leak "should have been treated as a critical incident and should have triggered a Gold Group [a meeting led by the Association of Chief Police Officers] under a Chief Officer to determine the next steps", the police controversially struck a deal with Johnson and the BBC giving them exclusive access to, and insider knowledge of, the investigation. This led to the BBC having a news crew and helicopter in position above Richard's home in Berkshire to provide live news coverage as the police commenced a raid on the property on 14 August 2014, and extraordinary contact between Johnson and SYP's press officer. Johnson received a text alerting him that the police were "Going in now, Dan", to which he replied: "Give me a shout before they take anything out, so we can get the chopper in place for a shot." The BBC later apologised for the "distress" caused to Richard by its live coverage, and in 2018 Richard was awarded £210,000 in damages against the BBC.

== Awards ==
- The Guardian Student Media Awards – Runner up, Student Feature Writer of the Year 2006; Runner up, Diversity Writer of the Year 2006.
- Royal Television Society Awards (Yorkshire) – Most Promising Newcomer 2012.
- Royal Television Society Awards (Yorkshire) – Regional Factual Programme 2013; News Coverage 2013; Runner up, Journalist of the Year 2013.
- O2 Media Awards (Yorkshire and Humber) – Scoop of the Year 2013 Inside Out: Yorkshire and Lincolnshire – "The Battle of Orgreave"; Runner up, Best News Reporter 2013; Runner up, Best TV Journalist 2013.
