= Peter Woon =

British journalist

- Woon in 1970
- Born: 1931; Bristol, England
- Died: May 2014 (aged 82–83)
- Occupation: News editor

Peter Woon (1931 – May 2014) was a news and current affairs editor at the BBC. In roles managing radio and then television news over two decades, he made key changes in significant areas of how news was broadcast.

== Career ==
Woon began his career as a newspaper reporter, including working at the Bristol Evening Post, and later at the Daily Express, where is duties included reporting on defence and aviation. He was hired by the BBC in 1961 at a time when the corporation was seeking new talent from different backgrounds so that BBC News could better respond to the growing success of competitor ITN. His first job was as a television news reporter at Alexandra Palace, working for Tom Maltby. Due to a lack of assignments as a reporter, he moved into a position as a news editor, and in 1966 ran the half-hour programme Newsroom on BBC Two, hiring young reporting staff with newspaper experience, such as Tom Mangold and John Sergeant, and making Ken Goudie an assistant editor.

In 1969 he assumed control of the BBC's radio news service. He soon introduced the use of live "on the spot" reporting and interviews during radio news bulletins. These live inserts were called in by telephone, which led to some complaints about quality, but the practice caught on and became a key aspect of the format of news reports. Woon also supported the introduction of female newsreaders. In 1979 Woon and Aubrey Singer took the decision to add a permanent female presenter to BBC Radio Four's influential Today current affairs programme. This was a significant step forward, since only six years earlier Radio Four's presentation editor had said, "A news announcer needs to have authority, consistency and reliability. Women may have one or two of these qualities, but not all three".

In 1980 Woon became editor of television news, where he began the use of journalists as BBC Television newsreaders, starting with John Humphrys and John Simpson on the Nine O'Clock News; newsreading had previously been an entirely separate role. He also oversaw the launch of The Six O'Clock News.

Woon received criticism over the BBC coverage of the miners' strike. In an internal BBC meeting on 20 June 1984 he said there had been "a general feeling in the newsroom" the previous evening that coverage had "a marginal imbalance". Woon later said that the editing had been difficult due to the quantity of material, but the accusations of BBC bias were wrong. He also faced criticism over the BBC's coverage of the Falklands War and the Northern Ireland conflict.

Woon moved from being television news editor to holding publicity and ambassadorial roles for the BBC; in 1985 he became the BBC's representative in the United States. He retired in 1988.

== Personal life ==
Woon was born in Bristol in 1931. He married Betty in 1956, but divorced in 1974. He was divorced by his second wife, Diana, a former colleague, in 1992. His interests included cricket, and travelling, including cruises. He served as a Governor for his former school, Christ's Hospital, and acted as a pastoral mentor for one of its students.

== Death ==
In his final years, Woon was diagnosed with cancer. In May 2014, while on an Elbe River cruise, he was taken to hospital in Dresden, Germany, after suffering injuries from a fall, which led to his death at age eighty-two. He was cremated in Dresden with a funeral ceremony attended by his son, Peter and partner Frances. He left a significant bequest both to his former school, Christ's Hospital, and a dozen charities. He set up a fund for the further education and wellbeing of a former Christ's Hospital student.
