= BBC controversies =

This article outlines controversies involving the British Broadcasting Corporation (BBC) in chronological order. It includes allegations of political bias, editorial mistakes, disputed broadcasts, presenter misconduct, and wider institutional failings. The article also covers the BBC's responses to these controversies, including internal investigations, public apologies, leadership changes, and external scrutiny.

== Early years ==
=== 1926 general strike ===
In 1926, the General Council of the Trades Union Congress (TUC) called a general strike to protest poor working conditions and impending pay cuts affecting roughly 1.2 million coal miners. Labour Party leaders, including Ramsay MacDonald and Philip Snowden, criticised the BBC for a biased and misleading portrayal of the strike.

Prime Minister Stanley Baldwin was coached by John Reith during a national address concerning the strike, which was transmitted from Reith's residence. When MacDonald requested airtime to reply, Reith initially supported the idea. However, because Baldwin was strongly opposed to MacDonald broadcasting, Reith ultimately refused the request.

Baldwin's government blocked the BBC from airing statements from Labour and TUC leaders about the strike. When Philip Snowden, the former Labour Chancellor of the Exchequer, wrote to the Radio Times to protest the BBC's treatment of the unions, Reith conceded that the organisation was not fully independent of the government. Randall Davidson, the Archbishop of Canterbury, wished to broadcast a "peace appeal" urging an immediate end to the strike, the renewal of coal industry subsidies, and the preservation of miners' wages. Reith denied the request, concern that Winston Churchill—who wanted to use the BBC as a government tool—would exploit the speech to seize control of the corporation. Reith later noted in his diary that the government "know[s] they can trust us not to be really impartial".

A post-strike analysis conducted by the BBC's Programme Correspondence Department revealed that among those polled, 3,696 praised the coverage while 176 criticised it.

=== Between the wars ===
In 1927, under a Royal Charter, the BBC became a public entity for the first time, with requirements including impartiality and a ban on staff expressing opinions on controversial subjects.

Prior to World War II, John Reith excluded Winston Churchill from the BBC airwaves. At the time of the Munich Agreement of 1938, Churchill "complained that he had been very badly treated...and that he was always muzzled by the BBC".

=== 1930s to Cold War: MI5 vetting ===
From the late 1930s until the end of the Cold War, MI5 had an officer at the BBC vetting editorial applicants. During World War II, 'subversives', particularly suspected communists, such as the folk singer Ewan MacColl, were banned from the BBC. The personnel records of anyone suspicious were stamped with an arrow-shaped green tag, or "Christmas tree." Only a handful of BBC staff knew what the tags meant.

=== 1930s: Commercial radio controversy ===
Because the BBC had become both a monopoly and a non-commercial entity, it soon faced competition from British subjects who were operating leased transmitters in Europe before World War II. John Reith, who had been given powers to dictate the BBC's cultural output, retaliated by leading the opposition to these commercial stations. Controversy split over into the press when the British government attempted to censor the printing of their programme information.

=== 1930s onwards: Broadcasting jazz ===
In My Father: Reith of the BBC, John Reith's daughter Marista Leishman said that he banned the playing of jazz music on the BBC and that he wrote in his diary that "Germany has banned hot jazz and I'm sorry that we should be behind in dealing with this filthy product of modernity."

== Post-war ==
=== 1950s: Claimed involvement in Iranian coup d'état ===
A BBC Radio 4 documentary in 2005 claimed it had evidence that a radio newsreader inserted the word "exactly" into a midnight time check one summer night in 1953, as "It is now exactly midnight". This was said to be a code word to Mohammad Reza Pahlavi, the Shah of Iran, that Britain supported his plans for a coup. The Shah selected the word, the documentary said, and the BBC broadcast it at the government's request. The BBC spokesman declined to comment on a possible connection.

=== 1950s: Independent television controversy ===
Winston Churchill's government passed the Television Act 1954, which allowed the creation of Britain's first commercial television network, ITV. Reith, among others, criticised this in the House of Lords. Churchill explained to his doctor, Lord Moran: "I am against the monopoly enjoyed by the BBC. For eleven years they kept me off the air. They prevented me from expressing views which have proved to be right. Their behaviour has been tyrannical. They are honeycombed with Socialists—probably with Communists".

=== 1964: "Clean Up TV campaign" ===
Mary Whitehouse launched her 'Clean Up TV campaign' in April 1964. In her view, Hugh Greene, as BBC Director General, was "more than anybody else ... responsible for the moral collapse in this country." The campaign of Whitehouse and her supporters soon became the National Viewers' and Listeners' Association. Whitehouse opposed the liberalisation policies pursued by Greene and sustained by his successors at the Corporation. Whitehouse's campaign focused more on the BBC than on ITV.

=== 1965: The War Game ===
The War Game, directed by Peter Watkins, is a pseudo-documentary recounting the aftermath of a fictional attack on London with a one-megaton nuclear bomb. Intended for the twentieth anniversary on 6 August 1965 of the dropping of the bomb on Hiroshima, The War Game was banned by the BBC, which said it was "too horrifying for the medium of broadcasting". The chairman of the BBC board of governors, Lord Normanbrook, wrote in a secret letter to the cabinet secretary, Burke Trend, that "The showing of the film on television might have a significant effect on public attitudes towards the policy of the nuclear deterrent". Although the British Film Institute (BFI) approved it for a limited cinema release and it won an Oscar for Best Documentary, the BBC did not screen the film until 1985.

In 2012, John Pilger wrote that, in banning Watkins' film, the BBC was performing "the function of the state broadcaster as a cornerstone of Britain's ruling elite".

=== 1969: Enhanced subscriptions ===
In 1969, Reuters agreed to open a reporting service in the Middle East as part of a British Foreign Office plan to influence the international media. To protect Reuters' reputation, which may have been damaged if British government funding became known, the BBC paid Reuters "enhanced subscriptions" for access to its news service, and was in turn compensated by the British government for the extra expense. Under the plan, the BBC paid Reuters £350,000 over four years.

=== 1971: Yesterday's Men ===
Yesterday's Men is a BBC documentary first broadcast in June 1971 about former ministers in Harold Wilson's Labour government who were facing opposition. The programme makers, including reporter David Dimbleby, angered Wilson and the Labour Party, which saw their approach as displaying explicit Conservative bias. According to the official History of the BBC web page on the incident, the Labour politicians were "effectively tricked into taking part in a programme that would ridicule them". In an untransmitted section of their interview, Dimbleby asked Wilson about the money he had made from his memoirs, leading to a furious exchange between the two. Wilson wanted the programme shelved, but it was broadcast with minor changes.

== 1979–2000 ==
=== 1979: Panorama ===
During The Troubles, Panorama showed masked IRA men manning a roadblock in Carrickmore. The Army and the Royal Ulster Constabulary immediately withdrew their cooperation with the BBC, and the Unionist leader James Molyneaux claimed the filming was "at least a treasonable activity". The BBC governors issued a statement admitting that filming the IRA roadblock "would appear to be a clear breach of standing instructions in relation to filming in Ireland". In the House of Commons, the Conservative MP Tim Eggar requested that the Prime Minister, Margaret Thatcher, "contact the governors of the BBC to express extreme concern about the way in which the Panorama team seems to have encouraged the IRA to break the law in Northern Ireland". Thatcher replied that the government contacted the BBC about the programme: "My honourable Friend will know that this is not the first time that we have had occasion to raise similar matters with the BBC. My right honourable Friend, the Home Secretary, and I think that it is time that the BBC put its house in order".

=== 1982: Falklands War ===
During the Falklands War, the Prime Minister Margaret Thatcher and some Conservative MPs believed that the BBC was excessively even-handed between Britain and Argentina, referring to "the British" and "the Argentines" instead of "our forces" and "the enemy".

On 2 May, during a report for Newsnight, Peter Snow remarked: "Until the British are demonstrated either to be deceiving us or to be concealing losses, we can only tend to give a lot more credence to the British version of events". The Conservative MP John Page complained that the programme was "totally offensive and almost treasonable". Answering a question from Page on 6 May, Thatcher said:

"Many people are very concerned indeed that the case for our British forces is not being put over fully and effectively. I understand that there are times when it seems that we and the Argentines are being treated almost as equals and almost on a neutral basis. I understand that there are occasions when some commentators will say that the Argentines did something and then "the British" did something. I can only say that if this is so it gives offence and causes great emotion among many people".

The Sun newspaper published an editorial on 7 May titled "Dare Call it Treason: There are Traitors in Our Midst" which criticised Snow. The Daily Mirror came to Snow's defence in an editorial titled 'The Harlot of Fleet Street', calling The Sun "coarse and demented" and that it had "fallen from the gutter to the sewer...The Sun today is to journalism what Dr Joseph Goebbels was to truth".

The 10 May edition of Panorama (titled "Can We Avoid War?") also provoked outrage. The day after it was broadcast, the Conservative MP Sally Oppenheim asked Thatcher in the Commons: "Is she aware that for the most part, but not all, it was an odious, subversive, travesty in which Michael Cockerell and other BBC reporters dishonoured the right to freedom of speech in this country?" Thatcher responded: "I share the deep concern that has been expressed on many sides, particularly about the content of yesterday evening's 'Panorama' programme. I know how strongly many people feel that the case for our country is not being put with sufficient vigour on certain—I do not say all—BBC programmes. The chairman of the BBC has assured us, and has said in vigorous terms, that the BBC is not neutral on this point, and I hope that his words will be heeded by the many who have responsibilities for standing up for our task force, our boys, our people and the cause of democracy".

According to the commander of the British Naval Task Force, Sandy Woodward, while the British were preparing to land on San Carlos, the BBC World Service broadcast that the Battle Group and Amphibious Group of the Task Force had joined up. Woodward later wrote: "I had hoped that this particular rendezvous at least could have remained a military secret until after the actual landing, but as ever the British media were more interested in the truth than in the consequences for our own people. We were infuriated". Some on the Task Force said that "if we got hit on the way and lost a lot of men, the Director General of the BBC should be charged with treason". Shortly before the attack on Goose Green, the BBC broadcast that an attack was imminent and that the 2 Para regiment were within five miles of Darwin. According to Woodward, there "are still some who believe that BBC report was directly responsible for the Argentinian 'ambush' in which Colonel Jones and many others died. Standing in the Ops Room of Hermes on the day the BBC effectively informed the Argentinians of our position and bearing, I am sure we all felt the same". Thatcher later wrote: "Many of the public (including us) did not like the attitude [of the media] particularly the BBC...My concern was always the safety of our forces. Theirs was news".

=== 1984: "Maggie's Militant Tendency" controversy ===
In January 1984, the BBC programme Panorama broadcast "Maggie's Militant Tendency" which claimed that a number of Conservative MPs, including Neil Hamilton, Harvey Proctor and Gerald Howarth, had links to far-right organisations both in Britain and on the Continent.

The programme was based on an internal Conservative Party report compiled by Phil Pedley, Chairman of the Young Conservatives. Panorama confirmed its status with a senior Conservative Party vice chairman. The report was formally presented to the party in the week before the programme was aired. During production, attempts to contact some of the named MPs for comment were unsuccessful. Hamilton's wife Christine later described how "Neil and I had devised a method for making sure that Panorama personnel would not be in a position to say that Neil had refused to speak." The programme was vetted prior to transmission by the BBC's lawyers, by the Head of Current Affairs Television, and by the Chief Assistant to the Director General, Margaret Douglas.

Two of the MPs named in the programme (Hamilton and Howarth) sued the BBC and the programme-makers. The Director-General, Alasdair Milne, reviewed the BBC's own legal advice and that of his Chief Assistant, and declared the programme "rock solid". The Board of Governors (Chairman Stuart Young) also backed programme to be defended in court. Stuart Young died in August 1986, two months before the libel case against Panorama came to trial. A new chairman, Marmaduke Hussey, had been appointed, but had not formally arrived at the BBC when the trial opened on 13 October 1986. Hussey nevertheless spoke with the BBC's barrister, Charles Grey. Hussey says in his memoirs that 'Grey thought it unlikely the BBC would win.' Sir Charles Grey disputes this statement, saying that 'my junior and I both thought the case was winnable'.

The first four days of the trial were given over to opening statements from Hamilton, Howarth, and their lawyers, which received wide press coverage. On the evening of the fourth day, the BBC's Assistant DG Alan Protheroe informed the BBC's legal team and the named defendants that the Governors now wished to settle the case immediately. This prevented the BBC's defence from being put to the court, or from becoming public.

Hamilton and Howarth were each awarded £42,042 in damages. Costs amounted to £506,053. They dropped their case against Phil Pedley.

=== 1984: Falsified coverage of miners' strike ===
A BBC crew filmed the footage of the "Battle of Orgreave" clash on 18 June 1984. When this appeared on that evening's BBC news bulletins, it was edited and broadcast out of chronological sequence, falsely showing pickets throwing stones at the police and the police subsequently carrying out a mounted charge.

=== 1985: The Troubles / Ban on McGuinness interview ===
In 1985, the government made an 'unprecedented' public request to stop the broadcast of a programme on extremism in Northern Ireland. In particular, it included an interview with Martin McGuinness, then reputedly an IRA official, but also an elected member of the Ulster National Assembly, the provincial legislature approved by London.

The Home Secretary at the time, Leon Brittan, wrote in a letter to the Board of Governors that the program was "against the national interest", elaborating: "even if the program and any surrounding material were as a whole to present terrorist organisations in a wholly unfavourable light, I would still ask you not to permit it to be broadcast." [sic]

BBC journalists protested the board's subsequent decision to cancel the program, launching a 24-hour strike, joined by independent commercial broadcast workers nationwide, that resulted in a virtual blackout of national news. Television news bulletins on the home services were reduced to short headline segments read by management employees, while regular programming on the BBC World Service suspended regular broadcasting across its 36 foreign-language services for the first time in its 53-year history; instead, the foreign services continuously looped music and a recorded statement explaining that the strike was "in protest against the decision by the BBC board of Governors to withdraw a television documentary about extremism in Northern Ireland following a request by the British government." The ongoing editorial crisis also sparked widespread reports of potential mass resignations among senior management staff over board interference in their editorial prerogatives.

=== 1986: Libyan raid controversy ===
The BBC News at Six reported on the American bombing raid on Libya. Thatcher and Conservative Party Chairman Norman Tebbit believed it accepted the Libyan government's propaganda about civilian casualties. They were also upset it gave no airtime to American or British spokesmen to explain their governments' stances. Tebbit ordered the Conservative Central Office to compile a dossier on the BBC's reporting and then to hand it to the lawyer Lord Goodman for a critique. Goodman's critique largely agreed with the dossier's findings, and on 30 October, Tebbit submitted it to Lord Barnett, saying that the BBC's coverage was "a mixture of news, views, speculations, error and uncritical carriage of Libyan propaganda which does serious damage to the reputation of the BBC". The BBC rejected its findings.

=== 1986: Secret Society controversy ===
In 1986, BBC journalists went on strike to protest police raids searching for evidence that a BBC television series in production, Secret Society, had endangered national security. Police searched the BBC studios in Glasgow, Scotland; the London home of investigative journalist Duncan Campbell; and the New Statesman offices.

On 12 June 1985, the controller of BBC2, Graeme MacDonald, was offered a series of documentaries by the BBC studios in Scotland, in conjunction with an offer from Duncan Campbell, whose work had previously appeared in the New Statesman magazine. The programmes were six half-hour films by Duncan Campbell (researched and presented by Campbell and produced according to BBC standards) that illuminated "hidden truths of major public concern".

Work began on the series. In April 1986, Alan Protheroe, acting on behalf of BBC Director General Alasdair Milne, was asked for permission to bug a private detective who said he could access a Criminal Records Office computer. Permission was granted, and filming took place. The police were informed, and the man was subsequently charged under Section 2 of the Official Secrets Act 1911.

The sixth programme would have revealed details of a top-secret spy satellite. Alisdair Milne had already decided to cut it from the line-up when The Observer newspaper broke the story on 18 January 1987 with the headline: "BBC gag on £500M defence secret". Alongside this story was a report that the Home Office intended to restrict the broadcast receiver licence fee, implying that the government had decided to censor BBC investigative journalism.

Soon afterwards, the government banned a series of programmes on BBC Radio Four called My Country Right or Wrong because it might have revealed sensitive secrets. The series was censored only a few hours before it was due to start because it dealt with similar issues to the television series concerning the British "secret state". However, it was eventually broadcast uncut, after the government decided that it did not breach any laws or interfere with national security.

=== 1987: Sacked director general controversy ===
On 29 January 1987, the newly appointed chairman of the BBC Board of Governors, Marmaduke Hussey, sacked Alasdair Milne. He was replaced by a senior BBC accountant, Michael Checkland. Milne later wrote his account of this affair in The Memoirs of a British Broadcaster.

=== 1988–1994: The Troubles / voice restrictions ===
On 19 October 1988, Conservative Home Secretary Douglas Hurd, under Prime Minister Margaret Thatcher, issued a notice under clause 13(4) of the BBC Licence and Agreement to the BBC and under section 29(3) of the Broadcasting Act 1981 to the Independent Broadcasting Authority prohibiting the broadcast of direct statements by representatives or supporters of eleven Irish political and military organisations. The ban lasted until 1994, and denied the UK news media the right to broadcast the voices, though not the words, of all Irish republican and loyalist paramilitaries, while the ban was targeted primarily at Sinn Féin.

Government intimidation and laws before the ban had already led to self-censorship. An INLA interview in July 1979 on BBC's Tonight caused a controversy involving Prime Minister Thatcher and was the last time such an interview was heard on British television. The 1979 Panorama film of the IRA on patrol in Carrickmore was seized by police under the Prevention of Terrorism Acts in 1980 following an outcry in parliament and the press. In 1985, an edition of BBC's Real Lives series ("At the Edge of the Union") was temporarily withdrawn under government pressure. BBC governors found themselves in conflict with management, and the corporation's journalists went on strike for a day. The programme was later transmitted with minor changes.

BBC's coverage of Sinn Féin before the ban was minimal. In 1988, Sinn Féin was heard or seen on television only 93 times, had only 17 of the 633 formal BBC interviews, compared to 121 interviews with the Conservative Party and 172 with the Royal Ulster Constabulary and the civil service, and was never interviewed in the studio like many other participants. However, after the ban, coverage of Sinn Féin and Republican viewpoints declined sharply: television appearances fell to 34 times the following year, and the delays and uncertainties caused by ambiguities, voice-overs, and subtitles often led to coverage and films being dropped entirely.

The BBC's Head of Editorial Policy, Richard Ayre, looked for ways to allow the continuation of news reporting on the subject, during a time when 'The Troubles' in Northern Ireland were a matter of great importance and interest. He established that the ban could not prevent BBC from using actors to speak Adams' and other Republicans' words. The ban ultimately increased publicity.

The restrictions were lifted on 16 September 1994, two weeks after the first Provisional Irish Republican Army ceasefire (declared on 31 August 1994).

=== 1998: Richard Bacon cocaine controversy ===
On 18 October 1998, a presenter of the children's television programme Blue Peter, Richard Bacon, was in the headlines when it emerged that he had taken cocaine. The BBC released him from his contract immediately.

== 2001–2010 ==
=== 2003–2004: Intelligence on Iraq and the death of David Kelly ===
In 2003, the BBC aired allegations of the government ordering the falsification of an intelligence report on weapons of mass destruction in Iraq. (Note: For historical context: The United States justified their 2003 invasion of Iraq by falsely claiming the Iraqis to be in possession of WMDs. The British government at the time had little reason to believe that information to be erroneous; and especially not for it to be falsified by the Americans.) The government strongly denied the accusation. The following battle between government and broadcaster saw the BBC's source of information, David Kelly, commit suicide, and, in the subsequent Hutton Inquiry, the resignation of the prime minister's director of communications; then, upon publication of its findings, the resignation of both the Chair of the BBC as well as its Director-General and, eventually, the resignation of the accuser himself. The BBC's online history of itself describes it as "one of the most damaging episodes in the BBC's history".

On 29 May 2003, BBC Radio 4's defence correspondent Andrew Gilligan quoted a government official, later revealed to be Dr David Kelly, on the Today programme to have said that the British government had "sexed up" a dossier concerning weapons of mass destruction in Iraq, against the wishes of the intelligence services. In a follow-up article for The Mail on Sunday, Gilligan claimed that Alastair Campbell (the Prime Minister's Director of Communications and Strategy), was responsible.

Later, Dr David Kelly, a Ministry of Defence scientist, was named as the source of the news item, prompting official sources to suggest that Dr Kelly was not a credible source. The subsequent suicide of Dr Kelly resulted in an escalation of the conflict between the government and the BBC, during which both sides received severe criticism for their roles in the matter.

The row saw the BBC publish pieces such as Campbell wanted source revealed, detailing forcefully written diary entries made available in the Hutton Inquiry, leading to Campbell's resignation. In concert with their coverage of the resignation, the BBC put its foot in the door, publishing a poorly written profile on Campbell that suggested his success stemmed from having given up alcohol, included other less-than-relevant details, and most unflattering photographs. None of the following inquiries found wrongdoing beyond 'mistakes' on Campbell's behalf.

The January 2004 findings of the Hutton Inquiry into Dr Kelly's death were extremely critical of Andrew Gilligan, as well as of the corporation's management processes and standards of journalism. In the aftermath, the BBC chairman, Gavyn Davies, and the Director-General, Greg Dyke, resigned, followed by Gilligan himself. After the release, Lord Hutton was accused of failing account for the imperfections inherent in journalism, while giving the government the benefit of the doubt. Large parts of the media at the time branded the report a whitewash.

After Lord Butler published a second review several months later, The Independent, in an article that carefully held on to a healthy amount of scepticism, gave voice to Gilligan and Dyke, who maintained they had done the right thing in publishing and defending the initial story. The Butler Review, among other findings on the intelligence on weapons of mass destruction as presented in the September Dossier, had given a rather vague statement regarding the production of the Iraq Dossier:

"... the fact that the reference [to the 45 minute claim] in the classified assessment was repeated in the dossier later led to suspicions that it had been included because of its eye-catching character."

Scott, in 2004, suggested that an accessible explanation for the incident lies in examining the parties' differing professional cultures. Kelly sought to communicate scientific truth, Gilligan sought to communicate the government's lacking argument, and Campbell sought to communicate the case for war in the most convincing way available.

=== 2004–2012: Balen Report ===
In 2012, the BBC won a year-long legal battle over releasing the Balen Report under the Freedom of Information Act of 2000 (FOI). It began in 2007, when the BBC decided to challenge the Information Tribunal's initial decision to release the report.

It is a report on the BBC's Middle East coverage written in 2004, and was commissioned by former BBC Director of News Richard Sambrook following persistent complaints from the public and the Israeli government alleging anti-Israel bias.

In August 2012, the politics website The Commentator reported a Freedom of Information request they had made, which indicated that the BBC had spent £330,000 in legal costs. This figure does not include BBC in-house legal staff time or Value Added Tax.

=== 2004–2011: Siemens outsourcing ===
In 2004, the BBC Governors approved a deal to outsource the BBC's IT, telephony, and broadcast technology (previously run by the corporation's internal BBC technology division) to the German engineering and electronics company Siemens IT Solutions and Services (SIS). The sale of BBC Technology was claimed to deliver over £30 million in savings to the BBC. In June 2007, a report published by the House of Commons Public Accounts Committee criticised the deal, claiming that BBC management had omitted £60 million in hidden costs in its application to the Board of Governors and had not accounted for Siemens' profits. Recorded savings to the BBC had amounted to £22m, 38% lower than the BBC's original forecast.

The BBC's partnership with Siemens underwent some high-profile difficulties, including issues with the corporation-wide switchover to an IP telephony system in 2009; a major outage of the BBC website in 2011; and Siemens was the original technology partner in the Digital Media Initiative until its contract was terminated in 2009 (see below). In December 2010, the French company Atos acquired SIS from Siemens, and now manages BBC IT, broadcast, and website systems.

=== March 2007: Blue Peter phone-in ===
A phone-in competition supporting Unicef, held by the children's programme Blue Peter in November 2006, was revealed to have been rigged. The winning caller was a visitor to the set who pretended to be call from an outside line to win a prize. The competition was rigged because of a technical problem with receiving the calls. The controversy sparked a wider controversy in which other broadcasters were fined for faking telephone competitions.

=== March 2007: BBC Jam ===
In 2006, the BBC launched a free educational website for children, BBC Jam, which cost £150 million. After several commercial education software suppliers complained that the BBC was engaging in anti-competitive practices by offering this service for free, the BBC Trust announced it would suspend the website pending a review. The following year, the corporation discontinued the service.

=== July 2007: A Year with the Queen ===
In early 2007, the BBC commissioned RDF Media to make a behind-the-scenes film about the monarchy, titled Monarchy: The Royal Family at Work, for BBC One. The BBC showed a 60-second trailer on BBC1 autumn launch in London on 11 July. The trailer showed two clips of Queen Elizabeth II; one in which she tells photographer Annie Leibovitz that she will not remove her crown to make the scene look "less dressy", and another in which the Queen says "I'm not changing anything. I've done enough dressing like this".

The shots in the trailer were edited out of sequence, making it appear as if the Queen had abruptly left the photo shoot, when in fact, the second shot showed her entering the shoot. BBC 1 Controller Peter Fincham told journalists at the launch that it showed the monarch "losing it a bit and walking out in a huff".

The next day, newspapers and other media sources ran headlines stating that the Queen had stormed out during the session. On 12 July, the BBC released a formal apology to both the Queen and Leibovitz. On 16 July, RDF Media admitted it was "guilty of a serious error of judgement"; Fincham and RDF Media chief creative officer Stephen Lambert both resigned.

In October 2007, the BBC released the report of its investigation into the incident. The investigation concluded that nobody at the BBC "consciously set out to defame or misrepresent the Queen" and that there was never a possibility "that the misleading sequence could have been included in the finished documentary to be broadcast by the BBC" but that nonetheless "the incident reveal[ed] misjudgements, poor practice and ineffective systems as well, of course, as the usual helping of bad luck that often accompanies such sorry affairs."

=== September 2007: The Blue Peter cat ===
When the children's programme Blue Peter acquired a pet cat in January 2007, it held an internet vote to choose a name for the animal. In September that year, it was revealed that viewers had selected the name Cookie, but producers changed the result to Socks, leading to accusations of breaching audience trust. An apology to viewers was subsequently made on the programme.

=== 2008: The Russell Brand Show prank telephone calls row ===
In a show recorded on 16 October 2008 and broadcast two days later, Russell Brand made several phone calls – along with guest Jonathan Ross – to the home of actor Andrew Sachs, claiming that Brand had sexual relations with his granddaughter Georgina Baillie, along with further apparently lewd suggestions. Later coverage in The Mail on Sunday newspaper led to a number of complaints, and ultimately Ross left the corporation.

=== 2009: Refusal to broadcast Gaza DEC Appeal ===
On 22 January 2009, the BBC declined a request from the Disasters Emergency Committee (DEC) to screen an aid appeal intended to raise money to aid the relief effort following hostilities in the Gaza Strip. Explanations from Mark Thompson, the BBC's then Director General, raised doubts about the possibility of delivering aid in a volatile situation and highlighted the need to avoid any risk of compromising public confidence in the BBC's impartiality in the context of an ongoing news story.

Because UK broadcasters lacked consensus, with British Sky Broadcasting announcing it would follow the BBC's view, TV channels in the UK initially decided not to broadcast the appeal. A public demonstration occurred outside Broadcasting House on 24 January, with former cabinet minister Tony Benn attacking the decision in an interview on BBC News 24, during which he read out the appeal address, and alleging that the Israeli government was preventing the appeal from being broadcast.

The Guardian reported that the BBC faced a revolt from its journalists over the issue, and that they had been threatened with dismissal if they spoke out. In an editorial, the paper described the refusal to broadcast the appeal as 'taking a partisan stance' and an error of judgement.

Four days after the BBC's refusal, ITV, Channel 4 and Five broadcast the appeal intact on 26 January. The BBC also broadcast substantial extracts from the appeal in its TV news programmes.

The BBC's decision drew criticism across the political spectrum, including from senior politicians such as Nick Clegg, Douglas Alexander, and Hazel Blears, and public figures like the Archbishops of York and Canterbury, although it was supported by other commentators, such as Dominic Lawson.

On 25 January 2009, then Secretary of State for International Development Douglas Alexander supported the appeal, telling Sky News: "My appeal is a much more straightforward one. People are suffering right now, many hundreds of thousands of people are without the basic necessities of life. That for me is a very straight forward case, and I sincerely hope that the British people respond with characteristic generosity."

MP Richard Burden put forward an early day motion calling on the BBC to screen the appeal which received the support of 112 MPs. Meanwhile, another Labour MP, Gerald Kaufman, complained about "nasty pressure" on the BBC from Israeli lobbyists. However, Mark Thompson, BBC's Director-General, denied that the decision was due to Israeli pressure. Complaints to the BBC about the decision were directed to Mark Thompson's blog. BBC's Newsnight programme reported that the BBC had received over 15,000 complaints and 200 letters of support.

After the appeal was broadcast on Channel 4 on 26 January 2009, Niaz Alam resigned as an external member of the BBC's Appeals Advisory Committee in protest at the BBC's explanation of its refusal to broadcast the appeal, after news coverage gave the impression the whole of this committee had been party to the decision.

A version of his resignation letter was published in Private Eye, defending the impartiality of the Disasters Emergency Committee's recommendation and criticised the BBC's refusal to broadcast the appeal. The letter also disputed the logic of blocking the appeal on impartiality grounds, by pointing out that 'the ultimate logic of a policy of avoiding appeals arising out of politically controversial conflicts would be for the BBC to ignore major humanitarian crises.'

Journalist and broadcaster Peter Oborne wrote and presented an edition of Channel 4's Dispatches titled "Inside Britain's Israel Lobby, " in which this controversy was featured as one small part towards the end, when he discussed the BBC's refusal to broadcast the 2009 DEC Gaza appeal with Niaz Alam.

The BBC Trust reported in its 'Decision of the BBC Trust' document on the appeal that 'the BBC Executive had received about 40,000 complaints about the Director General's decision'. The BBC's chief operating officer, Caroline Thomson, affirmed the need to broadcast "without affecting and impinging on the audience's perception of our impartiality" and that in this case, it was a "real issue."

The 2009 Gaza appeal is the only occasion on which the BBC is known to have refused an appeal broadcast request from the DEC.

The 2009 DEC Gaza appeal, screened only by Channel 4 and ITV, raised £8.3m. In August 2014, the BBC broadcast a new DEC aid appeal for people in Gaza, without similar controversy, which raised £16m over two years.

=== 2009: BNP Question Time appearance ===
Following the British National Party's improved performance in the 2009 European elections, the BBC controversially changed its stance on BNP's appearance on the flagship current affairs talk show, Question Time, and invited party leader Nick Griffin to appear on its edition of 22 October 2009. The BBC was also obliged to transmit BNP political broadcasts.

=== 2008–2013: Digital Media Initiative ===
In 2008, the BBC launched the Digital Media Initiative (DMI), a technology programme intended to streamline broadcast operations by moving to a fully digital, tapeless production workflow at a cost of £81.7 million. It was forecast to deliver cost savings of around £18 million for the corporation. The broadcaster contracted the work to technology services provider Siemens, with consulting by Deloitte.

Costs rose after technical problems and delays, and in 2009, the BBC terminated the contract with Siemens. BBC losses were estimated to be £38.2m, partially offset by a £27.5m settlement paid by Siemens, leaving a loss of £10.7m to the BBC. The UK National Audit Office criticised the broadcaster in 2011 for its handling of the project.

In 2009, the BBC brought the DMI project in-house and began work on a digital system known as Fabric. Lord Hall, the BBC's Director General, announced in late May 2013 that the project was to be abandoned after costs reached £98 million.

=== 2009–2012: Denis Avey Claims ===
On 29 November 2009, BBC News Channel broadcast claims by Denis Avey that he smuggled himself into Monowitz concentration camp in 1944. These claims were presented as fact on the BBC website and became the subject of the best-selling book The Man Who Broke into Auschwitz, co-authored by Avey and BBC journalist Rob Broomby. Avey's claims generated considerable controversy and were questioned in several newspapers. The BBC came under criticism for having broadcast these and for promoting the book. The BBC acknowledged the controversy in a subsequent programme.

=== 2009–2014: Women in panel shows ===
In 2009, actress and comedian Victoria Wood said BBC panel shows were too male-dominated and involved "a lot of men topping each other".

In February 2014, television executive Danny Cohen said that there would no longer be any all-male comedy panel shows on the BBC and that all shows must include a woman. Journalist Caitlin Moran referred to tokenism already existing on such shows. Dara Ó Briain, host of BBC Two panel show Mock the Week, also referred to tokenism and "token woman", speaking against this idea. Comedian Milton Jones called it "counterproductive".

Journalist Deborah Orr, although she also considered it "tokenistic", wrote in favour of the plan: "The issue of gender representation on panel games is comparatively trivial. But the fact is this: if comparatively trivial contemporary manifestations of long-standing disadvantage cannot be seen for what they are, and dealt with, but instead become mired in trenchant opposition, what hope is there in tackling the vast, brutal and comprehensive ones."

== 2010–2019 ==
=== 2010: Weapons claims offend Bob Geldof, Ethiopia and Africa ===
In March 2010, Bob Geldof confronted Andrew Marr on a BBC report claiming the Ethiopian government used money raised for the famine to pay for weapons. Geldof and the Band Aid Trust reported the BBC to Ofcom over the incident. Development agency Christian Aid also said it would complain to the BBC Trust. The Ethiopian ambassador to the UK Berhanu Kebede called it a "disgrace" and a "ridiculous report" and said the BBC had "destroyed its credibility in Africa" by making such claims. Geldof said it would be a "tragedy" if British people refused to donate money because of the claims.

The BBC initially said it stood by its report and claimed to have evidence to back it up. The BBC was forced to broadcast a series of apologies in November 2010, after realising that it did not have enough evidence that any money was spent on weapons, basing much of the claims on a CIA report it had failed to question. It also apologised to Geldof for claiming he had refused to respond to its fabricated story, with Geldof saying that the corporation had caused much damage to charity campaigns. He also said "appalling damage" had been caused to the Band Aid Trust by the BBC.

=== 2007–2011: Accusations of ageism and sexism ===
The BBC was accused of ageism and sexism when news presenter Moira Stuart (55) – the first black female television newsreader – was sacked in April 2007 after more than two decades of presenting, despite many male presenters in similar situations being allowed to continue in their jobs. In November 2008, four female Countryfile presenters (Michaela Strachan, Charlotte Smith, Miriam O'Reilly, and Juliet Morris), all in their 40s and 50s, were dismissed from the show.

The issue returned in July 2009, when former theatre choreographer Arlene Phillips (66) was replaced on the Strictly Come Dancing panel by Alesha Dixon, a pop star half her age. The male presenters were Len Goodman (65), Bruno Tonioli (53), Craig Revel Horwood (44), and Bruce Forsyth (81).

Former Countryfile presenter Miriam O'Reilly claimed she was "warned about wrinkles", and won an employment tribunal against the corporation on the grounds of ageism and victimisation – but not sexism. With other older women also dropped by the BBC, Joan Bakewell claimed the BBC's policy was "damaging the position of older women in society", whilst former Liberal Democrat leader Menzies Campbell said that the BBC was obsessed with youth culture and was shallow thinking.

=== 2010–2011: QI and Tsutomu Yamaguchi ===
In December 2010, the BBC broadcast an episode of its TV quiz show QI in which panellists made jokes during a discussion about Tsutomu Yamaguchi, who survived both atomic bombings of Hiroshima and Nagasaki in August 1945. Yamaguchi had died earlier that year. The Japanese embassy in London wrote a letter of complaint to the BBC about the quiz show's content after viewers in Japan contacted diplomatic staff about the offensive material. Yamaguchi's daughter also said how upset she was by the broadcast comments. She said that Britain, as a nuclear power, had no right to "look down" on her father.

In January 2011, the BBC issued an apology for "any offence caused" to Japan by the incident, recognising "the sensitivity of the subject matter for Japanese viewers". In February 2011, the BBC blamed a "strength of feeling" in Japan following its atomic bomb joke broadcast for the cancellation of the filming of part of its Planet Word documentary in Japan. Stephen Fry, the host of QI, was due to present the documentary.

=== 2011: Top Gear comments on Mexico ===
On 30 January 2011, the BBC broadcast an episode of its motoring TV show Top Gear during which presenters referred to Mexicans as both "lazy" and "feckless" and Mexican food as "refried sick". The broadcast caused many complaints in Mexico, including in newspapers and websites, while a motion of censure was considered in the Mexican Senate and the BBC Spanish-language website BBC Mundo received protests. Jeremy Clarkson, one of the presenters, expressed doubt that there would be any complaints against them as, he joked, the Mexican ambassador would be asleep.

British MPs described the comments as "ignorant, derogatory and racist" and called on the BBC to say it was sorry. Mexico's ambassador in London also requested that the BBC say it was sorry for the "offensive, xenophobic and humiliating" comments.

The BBC then offered an apology, though it claimed there was no "vindictiveness" in the remarks and that they were just part of the stereotype-based comedy the organisation espoused, such as when it "make[s] jokes about the Italians being disorganised and over dramatic, the French being arrogant and the Germans being over-organised". Trevor Phillips, head of the Equality and Human Rights Commission, told The Sunday Times that he was "not going to get hot under the collar about schoolboy provocation which frankly is organised so that we can get into a ruck and sell more DVDs for Jeremy Clarkson – Jeremy is rich enough".

=== Fake child labour footage in Bangalore ===
The BBC's then-nearly 60-year-old flagship weekly current affairs programme, Panorama, aired a documentary claiming that Bangalore-based suppliers of Primark, a successful retailer with 220 stores across Europe, were using child labour in 2008. The claim has been found to be untrue, and the BBC apologised to Primark, admitting its mistake. Responding to Primark's protest, the BBC conceded in a 49-page report that footage of three boys engaged in completing garments for Primark was "more likely than not" to have been "not genuine" after a three-year internal inquiry.

=== UEFA Euro 2012 in Poland and Ukraine ===
During the UEFA Euro 2012 football tournament in Poland and Ukraine, the BBC current affairs programme Panorama aired Euro 2012: Stadiums of Hate, which discussed racism in the sport. It included recent footage of supporters chanting various xenophobic slogans and displays of white power symbols and banners in Poland, as well as Nazi salutes and the beating of a few South Asians in Ukraine. The documentary received wide coverage in the British press, but later criticised as one-sided, sensationalist, and unethical. The critics included other British media outlets, Polish anti-racism campaigners, and black and Jewish community leaders in Poland. Polish and Ukrainian politicians and journalists, British fans visiting Poland and Ukraine, and Gary Lineker also voiced similar concerns about the broadcast.

The executive director of the Jewish Community Centre of Kraków, Jonathan Ornstein, a Jewish source used in the film, said: "I am furious at the way the BBC has exploited me as a source. The organisation used me and others to manipulate the serious subject of anti-Semitism for its own sensationalist agenda... the BBC knowingly cheated its own audience – the British people – by concocting a false horror story about Poland. In doing so, the BBC has spread fear, ignorance, prejudice and hatred. I am profoundly disturbed by this unethical form of journalism."

The Guardian reported: "Other sources have come forward to say that an interview with a Jewish Israeli player was also cut from the programme because he failed to confirm Panorama's "anti-semitism" thesis." The BBC interviewed midfielder Aviram Baruchian, who plays for Poland's Polonia Warsaw. One source present said the Panorama journalists complained afterwards that the interview was "useless". Panorama strongly denies this.

Despite the BBC warning, Poland and Ukraine fans were not exhibiting racist attitudes. By the end of the tournament, however, four other nations were fined by UEFA for the racist activities of their fans: Germany, Spain, Croatia, and Russia.

=== June 2012: Diamond Jubilee coverage ===
The BBC's live television coverage of the Queen's Diamond Jubilee River Thames Pageant on 3 June 2012 attracted media criticism, and the corporation reportedly received over 4500 complaints from the public about it. Criticism centred on the "informal" style of presentation, which some commentators perceived as too lowbrow for a royal occasion. Some reviewers thought presenters had focused too much on interviewing celebrities and were insufficiently prepared to add depth to the TV commentary.

Actor and writer Stephen Fry said the coverage was "mind-numbingly tedious", and BBC radio presenter Sue MacGregor said the coverage had failed to provide sufficient historical context to viewers. Poet Laureate Carol Ann Duffy and composer Gavin Greenaway publicly criticised the lack of television coverage given to the music which had been specially commissioned for the event. BBC creative director Alan Yentob defended the BBC's coverage, citing high audience approval ratings, and Mark Thompson congratulated the staff for their work on it.

=== October 2012: Jimmy Savile abuse scandal ===
In early October 2012, it was found that a Newsnight investigation into allegations of sexual abuse by the late Jimmy Savile had been shelved shortly before it was due to be broadcast. On 11 October, George Entwistle, the BBC's Director-General, directed the head of BBC Scotland, Ken MacQuarrie, to investigate why the program was cancelled, He also announced an investigation into the BBC's child protection policy and another into the department's culture, particularly during Savile's employment.

On 23 October 2012, Entwistle appeared before the Culture, Media and Sport Committee to answer questions following revelations that Savile had abused children on BBC property while working for the BBC. When asked by committee chairman John Whittingdale if the BBC's reputation for trust and integrity was in jeopardy, Entwistle stated that allegations of child abuse at the BBC were a "very, very grave matter". A Panorama investigation reported on what they considered to have been a paedophile ring that might have operated for at least 20 years, and possibly as long as 40 years, and BBC World Affairs editor John Simpson described it as the BBC's "biggest crisis for over 50 years".

On 12 November, the BBC announced that its director of news, Helen Boaden, was "stepping aside", together with her deputy Steve Mitchell, prior to the outcome of an investigation into the Savile child abuse claims. Nick Pollard's report into the shelving of a Newsnight report on Savile in 2011 was published on 19 December 2012. It concluded that the decision to drop the original report was "flawed", but that it was not made to protect programmes prepared as tributes to Savile. Pollard's report criticised George Entwistle for apparently failing to read emails warning him of Savile's "dark side", and stated that, after the allegations against Savile eventually became public, the BBC fell into a "level of chaos and confusion [that] was even greater than was apparent at the time". The BBC announced that Newsnight editor Peter Rippon and deputy editor Liz Gibbons would be replaced, and that deputy director of news Steve Mitchell had resigned, but that Helen Boaden would return to her role.

On 21 January 2013, the BBC News website ran a story revealing that the BBC had received 216 complaints for its children's channel CBeebies having shown a repeat of a cancelled children's programme called Tweenies the previous day, which showed a character impersonating Jimmy Savile by wearing a blonde wig, mimicking Savile's accent, and using Savile's catchphrase "Now then, guys and gals". The government communications industry regulatory Ofcom said it had also received "tens" of complaints. The episode was produced in 2001, over a decade before the scandal came to light, and the programme ended production entirely in 2003. The BBC responded with the following:

"This morning CBeebies broadcast a repeat of an episode of the Tweenies, originally made in 2001, featuring a character dressed as a DJ impersonating Jimmy Savile. This programme will not be repeated, and we are very sorry for any offence caused."

=== November 2012: Lord McAlpine falsely implicated in child abuse scandal ===
In the aftermath of the Jimmy Savile scandal, Newsnight investigated the North Wales child abuse scandal. On 2 November 2012, a former resident of the Bryn Estyn children's home was reported on Newsnight, claiming that a prominent but unnamed former Conservative politician had sexually abused him during the 1970s. The rumour spread on Twitter and other social media, where users identified the politician. After The Guardian reported a possible case of mistaken identity, Lord McAlpine issued a strong denial that he was in any way involved, asserting that the allegations were wholly false and seriously defamatory. The accuser unreservedly apologised, admitting that, as soon as he saw a photograph of the individual, he realised he had been mistaken. The BBC also apologised.

McAlpine began legal proceedings against the broadcasters who had made allegations, eventually settling for £185,000 from the BBC and £125,000 from ITV. In a subsequent libel case, Sally Bercow, wife of John Bercow, Speaker of the House of Commons, was prosecuted for libel over a Twitter post naming McAlpine. Following a High Court verdict in favour of the plaintiff, where Bercow's comment was found to have been defamatory, she paid undisclosed damages to McAlpine.

The decision to broadcast the Newsnight report without contacting its subject led to further criticism of the BBC, and the resignation of its Director-General, George Entwistle, on 10 November. It was later announced that Entwistle's severance package exceeded £1.3 million. Harriet Harman, Labour's Shadow Secretary of State for Culture, Media and Sport, declared that Entwistle had been rewarded for 'failure'.

=== July 2013: Executive payoffs ===
The large severance payments to departing BBC executives came to widespread media attention in 2013, when the National Audit Office conducted an investigation into BBC senior management pay. The practice had continued for several years. Senior executives whose payments were criticised included: chief operating officer Caroline Thomson, who received a total of £680,400 on her departure in 2011; Deputy Director-General Mark Byford, who also left the BBC in 2011, taking £949,000; CEO of BBC Worldwide John Smith, who was paid a total of £1,031,000 in 2011 (he later returned £205,000); George Entwistle, who left the Director-General job after only 54 days following the Savile crisis, and received a payment of £511,500; and Roly Keating, the head of BBC Archives, who received a £375,000 severance payment in 2012 (which he later repaid in full).

Margaret Hodge, chair of the Public Accounts Committee, criticised the practice, calling it an "outrageous waste of licence fee payers' money." Following his appointment as Director General, Lord Hall introduced a £150,000 cap on severance payments. Mark Thompson told the PAC that the BBC Trust had fully approved the payments.

=== November 2013: Generation War ===
BBC's plans to broadcast the German ZDF film Generation War upset certain British residents of Polish origin, as the film had already been accused of slandering the Polish anti-Nazi underground Armia Krajowa as anti-Semites, and of portraying false stereotypes of Poles and Germans during the period of occupation. In Germany, after ambassador Jerzy Marganski sent a letter of complaint to ZDF, the broadcaster took corrective action by producing and broadcasting the film 'Kampf ums Überleben'.

=== August 2014: Coverage of Cliff Richard's property search ===
On 14 August 2014, Sir Cliff Richard's apartment in Berkshire was searched by South Yorkshire Police in relation to an alleged historical sexual assault on a boy aged under 16. After police tipped off BBC journalist Dan Johnson, BBC reporters were on the scene as police arrived, and a BBC helicopter covered the raid as it happened. Richard, who was in Portugal at the time, released a statement saying the allegation was "completely false" and complained that the press appeared to have been given advance notice of the search, whereas he had not. The BBC's home affairs correspondent, Danny Shaw, stated that the media presence at Richard's home "was highly unusual – it appears to be a deliberate attempt by police to ensure maximum coverage", but added: "That's not illegal – but there are strict guidelines." South Yorkshire Police initially denied leaking details of the property search, but later confirmed that they had been "working with a media outlet" about the investigation.

By 19 August, the BBC was reported to have received up to 594 complaints regarding the coverage. Barrister and broadcaster Geoffrey Robertson questioned the legality of the search and called for an independent inquiry into the police operation and the earlier leak to the media about the property search. Former Attorney General Dominic Grieve accused the police of a "collusive relationship" with the BBC, saying the decision to tip off the BBC "seems quite extraordinary." Officials from the BBC and South Yorkshire Police were called before the Home Affairs Select Committee on 2 September. There, the chief constable of South Yorkshire Police accused the BBC of "extortion"; however, MPs dismissed this, with chairman Keith Vaz stating that the BBC had "acted perfectly properly" in its coverage of the raid.

After being told he would not be charged in June 2016, Richard said that he was considering suing the BBC. The BBC apologised for "distress" caused by its coverage but stood by the story, as it believed it was in the public interest. Richard sued the BBC and was awarded £210,000 in damages in July 2018, after London's High Court ruled that the broadcaster had infringed his right to privacy.

=== September 2014: Coverage of Scottish independence campaign ===
Throughout the campaign leading up to the Scottish independence referendum held on 18 September 2014, there were accusations claiming that the BBC was neither neutral nor impartial.

On 14 September 2014, thousands of protesters demonstrated outside BBC Scotland's headquarters in Glasgow, accusing the corporation and its political editor, Nick Robinson, of broadcasting "lies" and being "biased" against the Yes Scotland campaign. The demonstrators demanded that Robinson be dismissed. The 'Yes' campaign was not itself involved in the demonstration. The protestors later complained that the BBC did not broadcast coverage of the demonstration.

Alex Salmond, Scotland's First Minister and leader of the Scottish National Party, agreed with the view that the BBC was biased in favour of retaining the union. However, in an interview after his clash with Robinson, he said he believed the fault lay with the BBC's London-based staff rather than BBC Scotland itself.

Professor John Robertson and a team at the University of the West of Scotland monitored BBC and ITV news broadcasts until September 2013 for their study Fairness in the First Year. The report found that the BBC was biased against the 'Yes' campaign in airtime, sequencing of news items, prevalence of "bad news" items, and the misleading presentation of sources as impartial. John Boothman, BBC Scotland's head of news and current affairs, rejected Robertson's accusation that the BBC had suppressed coverage of the report, while Ken MacQuarrie, director of BBC Scotland, rejected the report's allegations.

=== January 2015: The Secret World of Lewis Carroll and contributors ===
The BBC commissioned a documentary by Swan Films, "The Secret World of Lewis Carroll", aired on BBC Two at 9 pm on 31 January 2015. marking the 150th Anniversary of the publication of Alice's Adventures in Wonderland by Lewis Carroll, which the documentary was commissioned to celebrate. A press release, issued a week prior to broadcast, stated: "To mark the 150th anniversary of its publication, this documentary explores the life and the imagination of the man who wrote it, the Reverend Charles Dodgson, better known as Lewis Carroll. Broadcaster and journalist Martha Kearney delves into the biographies of both Carroll and the young girl Alice Liddell, who inspired his most famous creation."

Upon broadcast, an amount of airtime was given to speculation over a nude photo of a young girl, which the documentary pushed as being by Carroll. The views came from a forensic consultancy for image analysis and a photo conservationist. On 4 February, one of the programme's contributors, biographer Jenny Woolf, claimed she hadn't been told the documentary would feature this photo and that she did not have time to provide counterclaims. "They had people with no relevant expertise in photographic history or knowledge of Carroll's life, whose entirely personal hunches were offered airtime…. on the other hand they didn't tell their own relevant experts anything about the image, so their opposing views were not given airtime or discussion." Another contributor, Edward Wakeling, claimed in June 2015 that "[The BBC] broke their code of conduct. When they had a controversial subject like this they should have checked it out."

Later that year, the BBC Trust reprimanded the documentary for failing to give contributors notice of the programme's changed content. "The image of the naked girl was a prominent feature of the programme, and its discovery had meant that the nature of the programme had changed significantly from the original commission. … The Trustees recognised that the BBC had made some effort at a late stage to inform the contributors of the programme's changes … The programme should have gone back to the contributors at an earlier stage to inform them about the new image and to give them adequate time to consider whether they were content with their contributions."

=== January 2015: Tim Willcox antisemitism allegation ===
While covering a unity rally after the antisemitic massacre at a Hypercacher kosher supermarket in Paris and the Charlie Hebdo terror attack, on 11 January 2015, the BBC's Tim Willcox interrupted the daughter of a Holocaust survivor discussing antisemitism in France by saying: "Many critics, though, of Israel's policy would suggest that the Palestinians suffer hugely at Jewish hands as well". After widespread criticism from the Jewish community for appearing to impute responsibility for Israel's actions to all Jews as a whole (in his use of the phrase "Jewish hands") and to justify the antisemitic massacre, Willcox apologised; Willcox had also received criticism months before for appearing to claim that many Jews disliked Ed Miliband because of the "mansion tax" he had proposed. The BBC Trust ruled that Willcox's behaviour did not violate its editorial guidelines.

=== March 2015: Jeremy Clarkson's contract ===
On 11 March 2015, the BBC suspended Jeremy Clarkson after a reported physical altercation with a producer. It was later established that Clarkson, in a "fracas", had punched producer Oisín Tymon during an argument over catering arrangements at the Top Gear production crew's hotel. A petition on change.org to reinstate Clarkson gained over one million signatures before it was delivered to the BBC.

On 25 March 2015, the BBC announced that Jeremy Clarkson's Top Gear contract would not be renewed and that he would be dropped from the programme. After an internal investigation, Director General Tony Hall, made the decision. This development led the other Top Gear presenters, Richard Hammond and James May, to support Clarkson by quitting Top Gear themselves (by allowing their BBC contracts to expire at the end of March without renewal).

=== January 2016: coordinated on-air resignation of Stephen Doughty ===
In January 2016, the team behind the BBC's Daily Politics show coordinated Labour politician Stephen Doughty's on-air resignation shortly before the start of Prime Minister's Questions. The show's output editor, Andrew Alexander, wrote a (later deleted) blog post for the BBC website explaining how it happened. He wrote: "We knew his resignation just before PMQs would be a dramatic moment with big political impact". The timing of the announcement caught Labour leader Jeremy Corbyn off guard. BBC News political editor Laura Kuenssberg "sealed the deal" with Doughty before filming, even though it appeared to viewers that the resignation had been unplanned. A camera crew even filmed Doughty and Kuenssberg arriving at the studio together before the announcement, which was to be televised later on news bulletins.

=== 2017 and 2018: Gender pay gap controversy ===
In July 2017, in response to a demand from the UK government as a condition of its new royal charter, the BBC published a list of all employees who earned more than £150,000. (Note: The list included only compensation paid directly from BBC's license fees; payments from BBC Worldwide and payments made through independent production firms were not included.) Of the 96 BBC employees making over this threshold, 62 were men, and 34 were women, and of the seven highest earners, all were men. The disclosure prompted criticism of the BBC over the gender pay gap; other critics also criticised a lack of ethnic diversity among the highest-earning BBC personalities.

In early January 2018, it was announced that Carrie Gracie, the BBC's China editor, had resigned from the role because of the salary gender disparity. A pre-broadcast conversation between Today presenter John Humphrys and Jon Sopel, the BBC's North America editor, was leaked a few days later. Humphrys was recorded joking about the disparity. BBC management itself was said to be "deeply unimpressed" with Humphrys' comments.

On 26 January, it became known that some of the BBC's leading male presenters would take a pay cut. According to the BBC's media editor Amol Rajan, Huw Edwards, Jeremy Vine, and John Humphrys were among those who agreed to a salary reduction.

=== 2019: Naga Munchetty accused of breaching BBC rules ===
In September 2019, the BBC upheld a complaint against Naga Munchetty for having breached BBC rules by giving an opinion on comments made by Donald Trump. The BBC reprimanded Munchetty for breaching its charter. After representations in her favour from many sources, Munchetty was cleared by Lord Hall, who commented: "racism is racism and the BBC is not impartial on the topic".

=== 2019: Removal of audience laughter from Question Time footage in a news report ===
In a special Question Time leaders' debate held on 22 November 2019 ahead of that year's UK general election, the leader of the Conservative Party and Prime Minister of the UK, Boris Johnson, was met with a question from an audience member about being honest in Johnson's position. The question was subsequently followed by laughter and applause from the rest of the audience, while Johnson struggled to answer.

The footage from the moment was largely untouched (complete with sound) in a report broadcast during that night's BBC News at Ten, but in another report about the same debate aired during the shorter Saturday lunchtime bulletin the next day, the laughter had been removed. A user on Twitter raised attention to the difference. Journalist Peter Oborne compared the incident to censorship on Soviet television, while BBC News presenter Huw Edwards defended it as an error rather than a conspiracy.

The BBC had initially defended the decision, claiming it was for timing reasons. However, the corporation later admitted that it was a "mistake".

== 2020–present ==
=== 2020: Emily Maitlis remarks on the Dominic Cummings coronavirus controversy ===
During the COVID-19 lockdown, it was revealed that Dominic Cummings, chief adviser to Prime Minister Boris Johnson, had travelled from London to his parents' house in County Durham. Cummings defended his actions and received Johnson's backing, sparking accusations of double standards in the enforcement of the lockdown. On 26 May, Emily Maitlis, host of BBC's Newsnight, delivered a highly critical direct-to-camera piece about the affair, stating that "Dominic Cummings broke the rules, the country can see that, and it's shocked the government cannot... He made those who struggled to keep to the rules feel like fools, and has allowed many more to assume they can now flout them. The prime minister knows all this, but despite the resignation of one minister, growing unease from his backbenchers, a dramatic early warning from the polls, and a deep national disquiet, Boris Johnson has chosen to ignore it. Tonight, we consider what this blind loyalty tells us about the workings of Number 10." The piece was criticised as being unduly biased and unsuitable for an impartial broadcaster. The BBC later stated that the piece "did not meet our standards of due impartiality".

=== 2020: Churchill Bengal famine comments ===
In 2020, a BBC News at Ten report featured Indian historian Rudrangshu Mukherjee saying that the former British prime minister Winston Churchill was "seen as the precipitator of mass killing" due to allegations of his failure in the Bengal famine of 1943. Claims of anti-South Asian racism were also made against Churchill by Oxford University professor Yasmin Khan.

Historians Tirthankar Roy and James Holland criticised the report's accuracy. The historian Max Hastings also criticised the report for failing to contextualise Churchill's actions, and former Panorama journalist Tom Mangold for uncritically endorsing a "woke" view of Churchill as a racist.

=== 2020: Usage of the word 'Nigger' in a news report ===
In 2020, a BBC News report included usage of the racial slur nigger. 18,600 complaints were made, leading the BBC to apologise on 9 August of that year. The word was part of a content warning for a following clip.

=== 2021: Coverage of the death of Prince Philip ===
In the days following Prince Philip's death, the BBC received over 100,000 complaints, a record number for British television, accusing it of excessive coverage and its perceived attempt to manufacture a largely absent national grief.

=== 2021: Martin Bashir accused of lying to gain his 1995 interview with Diana, Princess of Wales ===
In 2021, accusations emerged that Martin Bashir, a former interviewer for the BBC programme Panorama, had lied to secure his 1995 interview with Diana, Princess of Wales. Both of Diana's sons, Prince William and Prince Harry, released statements condemning Bashir and calling his practices unethical. Scotland Yard said it would assess what had happened to see whether a criminal investigation was needed. As a result of the controversy, the former BBC director general Lord Hall resigned as the chairman of the National Gallery.

=== 2021: Tala Halawa controversy ===
In May 2021, the media reported that Tala Halawa, who joined the BBC in 2017 and was reporting on the Israeli–Palestinian conflict, had posted anti-Israel and anti-Semitic tweets in 2014. Among her postings, Halawa had tweeted "#Hitler was right" and "Zionists can't get enough of our blood". As Halawa was reporting on the 2021 Israeli–Palestinian Crisis, doubts about her credibility as a neutral and objective reporter were raised.

In June 2021, the BBC announced that Halawa no longer worked for the BBC without providing further details. Halawa later issued a written statement, in which she blamed her dismissal on "external pro-Israel interest groups" and "pro-Israel censorship campaigns", and said that she had been dismissed due to the desire to "eliminate Palestinians from public life." She also said in the statement that she had been targeted by "pro-Israel groups" because she had "recently published a video report for the corporation about celebrities being criticised, trolled and cancelled for supporting Palestinian self-determination".

=== 2021: "We're being pressured into sex by some trans women" controversy ===
External link
- BBC logo "The lesbians who feel pressured to have sex and relationships with trans women"

"'We're being pressured into sex by some trans women'" is the original title of a BBC News article written by Caroline Lowbridge and published on 26 October 2021. Produced by the BBC's regional service in Nottingham, the article says that lesbians are being pressured into sex by a number of transgender women and cisgender activists. The article received widespread criticism among media watchdogs and the LGBTQ community for being transphobic. It drew particular attention for the inclusion of comments from Lily Cade, an American pornographic actress, who has been the subject of sexual misconduct allegations. Cade wrote a blog post after the article's publication calling for the "lynching" of high-profile trans women. Cade's comments were subsequently removed from the article.

Trans Activism UK, Trans Media Watch and at least one senior employee of Mermaids were critical of the article. An open letter with 20,000 signatories asked for the BBC to apologise. The Guardian and The Times reported that the article met backlash from BBC staff, including prior to its publication, while protests took place outside BBC offices. Criticisms centred on the inclusion of a social media poll from the anti-transgender group Get the L Out that was accused of having a low sample size and self-selection bias; it reported that 56% of the eighty lesbians polled had felt pressured or coerced into accepting transgender women as sexual partners. Critics also believed that Lowbridge's chosen interviewees had a narrow range of viewpoints. A Stonewall executive is quoted on the subject, as is the co-founder of the LGB Alliance, which was created in opposition to Stonewall after they began to campaign for transgender equality.

Chelsea Poe, a transgender pornographic actress, reported that Lowbridge interviewed her for the article but did not include her comments. She also reported telling Lowbridge that Cade had been subject to sexual assault allegations. The BBC initially assessed that the article met its editorial standards but that allegations against Cade should have been mentioned. However, on 31 May 2022, the Executive Complaints Unit of the BBC ruled that although the article was a "legitimate piece of journalism overall", it had breached the corporation's editorial rules on accuracy for not making clear the statistical invalidity of the Get the L Out poll and for the title misleadingly suggesting that the article focused on pressure from trans women. As a result, the article was subsequently renamed "The lesbians who feel pressured to have sex and relationships with trans women".

=== 2021: Coverage of antisemitic incident in Oxford Street ===
BBC online coverage of an incident in Oxford Street, in which a group of men were filmed spitting, shouting verbal abuse, and in one case making a Nazi salute at a privately hired bus carrying Jewish youths celebrating Hanukkah, claimed that racial slurs about Muslims could be heard inside the bus. This was later amended to state that a single "slur about Muslims" could be heard on the video. The revised claim of even a single slur was dismissed by the Metropolitan Police and vehemently rejected by the party on the bus, who stated that the alleged slur in English was in fact a call for help in Hebrew (Hebrew: תקרא למישהו, זה דחוף! – Tikra lemishehu, ze dachuf! – "Call someone, it's urgent!"). Parents of the victims in the bus accused the BBC of "demonis(ing) our children". The Board of Deputies of British Jews called on the BBC to apologise for the offending content. The Campaign Against Antisemitism subsequently organised a protest outside Broadcasting House on 13 December 2021.

On 26 January 2022, the Executive Complaints Unit issued a ruling that determining that "The online article as it stands must now be regarded as no longer meeting the BBC's standards of due accuracy and, to the extent that the anti-Muslim slur claim has become controversial, it also lacks due impartiality in failing to reflect alternative views." The report also asserted that, while the reference to the slur was included "in good faith" after an "unusually high level of consultation among colleagues", the BBC had failed to acknowledge the disputed nature of the phrase in question and had stonewalled the Jewish community's inquiries into the matter. On 3 February 2022, the BBC issued a further apology and acknowledged factually incorrect elements of its ECU report, which had incorrectly asserted that a member of the Community Security Trust had "verified" the BBC's interpretation of the phrase in question.

On 26 January 2022, after the ECU announced its report, Ofcom announced conducting its own further investigation into handling of the incident and its aftermath. In November 2022, Ofcom stated in its report on the matter: "The BBC made a serious editorial misjudgment by not reporting on air, at any point, that the claim it had made about anti-Muslim slurs was disputed, once new evidence emerged. This failure to respond promptly and transparently created an impression of defensiveness by the BBC among the Jewish community."

=== 2022: "Throwing a Paddy" ===
In October 2022, in an online review of a match between Manchester United and Tottenham, Cristiano Ronaldo was accused of "throwing a Paddy" in a BBC sports blog by Phil McNulty, when Ronaldo refused to come off the bench. The outdated phrase means an over-the-top reaction. The BBC declined to apologise, but removed the phrase "throwing a Paddy" from its match review.

=== 2023: Gary Lineker suspension ===
In March 2023, Gary Lineker, a sports presenter for the BBC, made a controversial tweet in which he compared the wording in the British government's "Illegal Migration Bill" to the rhetoric of Germany in the 1930s. The broadcaster subsequently suspended him for what it said was a violation of its impartiality policy. With other sports presenters supporting Lineker by refusing to work, the BBC changed its sports output format, including shortening Match of the Day and broadcasting it with crowd noise rather than a commentary.

=== 2023: Explicit pictures sent to Huw Edwards ===
On 7 July 2023, The Sun published a story stating that a woman had alleged to the BBC on 19 May that her child had been paid £35,000 by an unidentified, well-known male BBC presenter in exchange for nude photos since her child was 17, which could have been an illegal act in the UK. The Sun alleged that her child had used the money to fund their cocaine addiction. A spokesperson said the BBC would be "actively attempting to speak to those who have contacted us in order to seek further detail and understanding of the situation".

By 9 July, the BBC said that the presenter had been suspended. On 10 July, alleged victim's lawyer told the BBC that nothing inappropriate or illegal had taken place and dismissed the allegations. On 11 July, a second person came forward, accusing the presenter of sending "abusive and menacing" messages on a dating app.

On 12 July, the Metropolitan Police said that there was no evidence of a criminal offence. Shortly afterwards, the presenter was named as Huw Edwards in a statement by his wife, Vicky Flind. She said Edwards had been hospitalised for mental health problems. The Sun later reported that the contact began when the teenager was 17, without specifying when explicit photos were first exchanged.

Some considered the BBC's coverage excessive. Claire Enders, a media analyst, told The New York Times: "What we had was a kangaroo court, which destroyed someone who did not commit a crime", saying that the BBC "got drawn into a trap set by The Sun". Alan Rusbridger, the former editor of The Guardian, also told the NYT that "The BBC lost its sense of proportion" in its coverage of the story, adding: "It gets into this mind-set where it feels it must make up for sluggishness in handling issues by showing a clean pair of hands in covering them."

On 29 July, the Metropolitan Police announced that Edwards had been charged with three counts of creating indecent images of children. The charges involved images allegedly shared in a WhatsApp chat between December 2020 and April 2022. Edwards was arrested on 8 November 2023 and charged on 26 June 2024, following authorisation from the Crown Prosecution Service. He has been bailed to appear at Westminster Magistrates' Court on 31 July 2024.

On 16 September 2024, at Westminster Magistrates' Court, Edwards received a six-month suspended jail sentence after pleading guilty to three counts of making indecent images of children. He was also placed on the sex offenders' register for seven years and ordered to attend a sex offenders' treatment programme.

=== 2023: Report about Nigel Farage's bank account ===
After accepting that its report about the closure of the Coutts bank account held by former UKIP leader, Nigel Farage, was inaccurate, the BBC amended its article and came under pressure to apologise to Farage. After Farage complained that his account had been closed for political reasons, the BBC challenged his version by reporting that it had information saying it had been closed because he was not wealthy enough to hold the account. Using a request under the data protection laws, Farage obtained a 40-page document from the bank stating that the reason for the closure was 'because of the "reputational risk" he was seen to represent'. Farage said he would make a formal complaint about the BBC's reporting.

On 24 July 2023, The Telegraph reported that both the BBC and Simon Jack, the journalist who wrote the article, had apologised to Farage for their mistake.

=== 2023: BBC Arabic antisemitism ===
In September 2023, BBC Arabic published an article on suicide attacks, claiming a link between modern-day jihadists and the Sicarii (who did commit mass suicide, but not as part of an attack). CAMERA, Campaign Against Antisemitism, and Lord Carlile, the government's former independent reviewer of terrorism legislation, strongly criticised the article.

On 5 October 2023, BBC Arabic published a video claiming that observant Jews spit on Christians to celebrate the holiday Sukkot. The BBC did not issue an apology until June 2025.

=== 2023: Reporting of the Gaza war ===
In October 2023, the BBC denied accusations that it was acting as a "propagandist" for terrorist groups following criticism of its coverage of the al-Ahli Arab Hospital explosion in Gaza, where a correspondent had broadcast unverified speculation that Israel was responsible. While a spokesman rejected the claims and stated the network had presented both sides' competing accounts, the broadcaster simultaneously faced government criticism for its standing editorial policy of refusing to describe Hamas as a "terrorist" organisation, a terminology rule the BBC defended as necessary to maintain impartiality.

In late 2023, the BBC drew backlash for allegedly using softer wording with Palestinians killed in the Gaza war compared to Israelis who were killed. The primary example of this was the use of the word "killed" for Israelis and "dead" for Palestinians in their updates on the war, even though the Palestinian death toll had been considerably higher.

=== 2024: Portrayal of Milton Keynes on EastEnders ===
In an episode of EastEnders aired on 4 March 2024, the BBC drew backlash for its portrayal of Milton Keynes, when the character Bianca Jackson, played by Patsy Palmer, returned to screens in scenes set in her home in the city. One viewer, who has lived in the city since the 1970s, said: "They've chosen my city, my home, as a place to depict as being a slum." Ben Everitt, the Conservative MP for Milton Keynes North, said he was unhappy with the portrayal, and would contact the producers to suggest writing another storyline about "some of the brilliant parts of Milton Keynes".

=== 2024: Mrs Brown's Boys racist joke controversy ===
On 14 October 2024, the Daily Mirror published a story stating that Brendan O'Carroll, who stars as Agnes Brown in Mrs Brown's Boys, made a racist remark during a rehearsal of a Christmas special.

=== 2025: Gaza: How to Survive a Warzone ===
In February 2025, BBC Two aired a documentary titled Gaza: How to Survive a Warzone as part of its This World series. The film is narrated by a 13-year-old boy, the son of Hamas's deputy minister of agriculture. The BBC said the film's production company had not informed the broadcaster of the boy's family ties. BBC added an informational notice to the film description on its iPlayer before pulling the film the next day. Culture Secretary Lisa Nandy said she would raise concerns with BBC bosses over the documentary. Hamas is a proscribed terrorist group in the UK, Israel, and other countries. The broadcaster subsequently removed the film from BBC iPlayer.

In October 2025, an investigation by the UK's media regulator, Ofcom, found that the BBC committed a "serious breach" of broadcasting rules regarding the documentary. The regulator concluded that the program's failure to disclose that its 13-year-old narrator was the son of a deputy minister in the Hamas government was "materially misleading," as it deprived the audience of critical context. While the BBC had already removed the documentary from its BBC iPlayer in February, Ofcom sanctioned the corporation by directing it to broadcast a prime-time statement of the regulator's findings on BBC2. This marked the first time since 2009 that Ofcom sanctioned the broadcaster an ordered it to issue an on-air apology. A BBC spokesman confirmed that the corporation fully accepted Ofcom's ruling and would comply with the sanction.

=== 2025: Pahalgam attack reporting ===
Following the Pahalgam terror attack in India, the BBC reported the incident where it mislabeling "terrorists" as "militants". The Indian government strongly objected to the use of the word "militants". The Centre wrote to Jackie Martin, the chief of the BBC India operation, expressing India's strong sentiments regarding the deadly attack that killed 26 Indians, the majority of who were Hindus. The formal letter was issued following the BBC's coverage where it branded India as the perpetrator in the headline.

=== 2025: MasterChef controversy ===
In November 2024, it was reported that Gregg Wallace was to step away from MasterChef while allegations of historical misconduct were investigated. This came after the BBC reported to Wallace's representatives that there were allegations of inappropriate sexual comments from 13 individuals. In July 2025, production company Banijay reported that an inquiry into the allegations (conducted by law firm Lewis Silkin) found that 45 of 83 claims against Wallace, as well as an allegation of co-host John Torode using "an extremely offensive racist term", were upheld. Neither presenter will have their contracts renewed.

=== 2025: The King & Conqueror reception and historical accuracy ===
The BBC historical drama King & Conqueror received criticism from viewers and historians regarding its historical accuracy and production choices. Viewers described the series as an "expensive flop" and "complete, utter nonsense," highlighting modern language and dialogue deemed inappropriate for the 11th-century setting. Critics were similarly unimpressed, with The Telegraph branding it "more Monty Python than Game of Thrones" and The Guardian noting that it "hangs a little too heavy to achieve its goal of being a 'ripping yarn'".

Historians, including Zareer Masani and David Abulafia, challenged the production's casting choices, which deviated from historical evidence. Critics, including Craig Simpson of The Daily Telegraph, noted that the production employed a colour-blind casting approach, featuring black actors in roles such as the Mercian nobleman Morcar and the fictional Thane Thomas in a period noted for being ethnically homogeneous.

=== 2025: Glastonbury Festival ===
At the Glastonbury Festival 2025, punk-rap duo Bob Vylan sparked controversy when they led the crowd in chants of "Free, free Palestine" and "death, death to the IDF", referring to the Israeli Defence Forces, during a live performance broadcast by the BBC. Despite internal warnings labelling the act as "high risk", the BBC aired the set without delay or intervention, later admitting to "errors … both in the lead-up to and during Bob Vylan's appearance". Political leaders widely condemned the broadcast, including UK Culture Secretary Lisa Nandy, who accused the BBC of airing anti-semitic and inflammatory content. The BBC's Executive Complaints Unit later upheld complaints, concluding that the segment breached the corporation's harm and offence guidelines by containing anti-semitic language.

In response, the BBC announced that it would no longer livestream or broadcast "high-risk" performances without added safeguards, marking a major policy shift for its music coverage. BBC Director-General Tim Davie publicly called the decision to air the set "a very significant mistake", while the corporation's Director of Music, Lorna Clarke, stepped down from her daily responsibilities following internal criticism. Glastonbury organisers condemned the "death to the IDF" chants, stating that hate speech had no place at the festival, while UK police launched a criminal investigation into the performance. The controversy ignited wider debate about artistic freedom, editorial responsibility, and the risks of unfiltered live broadcasting at large public events.

=== 2025: Unsolicited nude images incident ===
In August 2025, there were reports that a female presenter ranked among the BBC's highest-paid employees had shown an image of a man's genitals to a junior female member of staff who was left "horrified and tearful". The incident occurred during a discussion between female employees about unsolicited nude images, and the presenter in question was ordered to apologise for her conduct, though her identity was not officially disclosed.

=== 2025: Coverage of Trump's 6 January Capitol speech ===
In November 2025, The Telegraph reported that an internal BBC memo alleged that the broadcaster's Panorama documentary Trump: A Second Chance? had misled viewers by editing together two separate portions of a speech by US President Donald Trump to make it appear he was explicitly encouraging the storming of the US Capitol on 6 January 2021. According to the memo, the programme spliced together remarks made more than 50 minutes apart. In the original video, Trump said, "We're going to walk down to the Capitol,"...and "cheer on our brave senators and congressmen and women." This was replaced with, "We're going to walk down to the Capitol,"...and "we fight like hell." This created the false impression of a single continuous exhortation to violence.

The Telegraph further said the documentary then showed footage of supporters marching on the Capitol as if it were a consequence of Trump's words, when in fact the footage had been filmed before his speech began. Conservative Party leader Kemi Badenoch condemned the edits as "absolutely shocking", saying that "heads should roll" at the BBC and calling for Director-General Tim Davie to "sack whoever put out misinformation". Former Prime Minister Boris Johnson also demanded accountability, asking on X whether anyone at the BBC would "take responsibility—and resign". The memo, reportedly written by former BBC Editorial Guidelines and Standards Committee adviser Michael Prescott, accused Panorama of creating a "distortion of the day's events" that undermined public trust, though BBC News stated it had not seen the document. A BBC spokesperson said that while the corporation did not comment on leaked materials, it took all feedback seriously and considered it carefully. The issue drew attention from MPs and the Department for Culture, Media and Sport, with Culture Secretary Lisa Nandy reportedly reviewing the memo and the BBC assuring officials it was examining the matter internally.

In the wake of mounting criticism, Tim Davie announced his resignation as BBC Director-General on 9 November 2025, stating the decision was his own but acknowledging mounting scrutiny over the broadcaster's editorial practices. His departure came alongside the resignation of Deborah Turness, the CEO of BBC News. BBC chairman Samir Shah apologised to the UK Parliament's Culture, Media and Sport Committee, acknowledging in his letter to them that the Panorama edit of Trump's speech was an "error of judgement" that wrongly gave the impression of a direct call for violence.

Defenders of the BBC, while acknowledging the inappropriate editing of a Trump speech in a 2024 Panorama programme, spoke of a political "coup". They highlighted the alleged role of BBC board member Robbie Gibb, who had worked as an editorial advisor to the GB News channel before being appointed to the BBC board by Boris Johnson. During the controversy, Lib Dem leader Ed Davey and Scotland's First Minister John Swinney called for Gibb's removal from the BBC board.

On 13 November, The Telegraph reported that the BBC's current-affairs programme Newsnight had, in June 2022, also aired a version of Trump's 6 January 2021 speech in which separate remarks were presented as a single continuous exhortation. On the same day, the BBC apologised to Trump over the editing of his speech in Panorama but rejected his demands for compensation.

Trump filed a lawsuit against the BBC for $10 billion over the doctored Panorama video.

In July 2026, during the ongoing lawsuit, a U.S. federal magistrate judge ordered Trump to provide the financial records the BBC requested as part of the discovery process. The BBC sought the records to examine Trump's claim that the Panorama documentary had caused "massive economic damage" to his brand, properties, and businesses. Trump's legal team opposed the disclosure and indicated that it would amend the complaint to focus on reputational damage rather than financial losses to his businesses. The judge also allowed the BBC to seek testimony and documents from Trump's inner circle, including family members and advisers.

=== 2025: Georgian Dream sues BBC over false allegations ===
On 1 December 2025, the ruling Georgian Dream party announced it would sue the BBC in international courts, accusing the broadcaster of publishing "serious and baseless accusations" against the Georgian government. The lawsuit follows an investigative report alleging that Georgian authorities used a World War I-era chemical agent, camite, to disperse protesters opposing the suspension of the country's EU accession process. According to the report, protesters suffered prolonged symptoms, including burning eyes, coughing, shortness of breath, and vomiting, which persisted for weeks. The BBC investigation relied on testimonies from medical personnel, affected protesters, and former police officials, as well as documentation of chemical inventories, suggesting that substances traditionally used in riot control may have been replaced with more harmful agents. The report raised international concern over potential human rights violations and the use of chemical agents in civilian crowd control.

Georgian Dream rejected the allegations, claiming the BBC relied solely on "interested parties" with political agendas and ignored the government's detailed responses. The party labelled the reporting as propaganda intended to smear the government, the police, and Georgian statehood, framing it as a misrepresentation of facts that justified legal action.

=== 2026: Holocaust Memorial Day coverage ===
On 27 January 2026, during Holocaust Memorial Day coverage on BBC Breakfast and BBC Radio 4, several news bulletins and introductions failed to explicitly identify Jewish victims among the "six million people murdered by the Nazi regime." After criticism from advocacy groups and commentators, the BBC issued an apology, acknowledging that those segments were incorrectly worded. A spokesman noted that other items and features within those same programs had correctly referenced the Jewish identity of the victims, and announced the BBC would publish an online correction.

=== 2026: Lucie Kon antisemitism settlement ===
In the wake of antisemitism that she claimed she experienced from fellow employees at the BBC after the Hamas-led October 7 attacks and being forced out of her job, producer Lucie Kon received a settlement of £400,000 in October 2026 in what was described by The Times as the first time that the BBC had made financial restitution to an employee regarding claims of antisemitism. The BBC, which recognized its internal problems in handling her claims, did not acknowledge that it was liable for the incidents.

== See also ==
- Criticism of the BBC

Other channels:

- Al Jazeera controversies and criticism
- CBS News controversies and criticism
- CNN controversies
- Fox News controversies
- MSNBC controversies
- The New York Times controversies
- NPR controversies
- Radio Televisyen Malaysia controversies
- Criticisms of Sky UK
