= Niaz Alam =

Bangladeshi journalist

Niaz Alam is a responsible investment consultant and journalist. He served as a director on the board of the London Pensions Fund Authority from 2001 to 2010, having been appointed as an adviser on Responsible Investment and human rights issues.

Since 2013, he has been a member of the editorial board of Dhaka Tribune for which he is an op-ed columnist, London bureau chief and former Chief Editorial Writer.

He was an elected vice chair and trustee of the international development charity War on Want from 2000 to 2007.

In 2009, he resigned as an external member of the BBC's Appeals Advisory Committee to protest the BBC's refusal to broadcast a Disasters Emergency Committee (DEC) appeal for humanitarian relief efforts in Gaza.

== Career ==
Since 1992, after training as a solicitor, Alam has worked and written widely on responsible investment, ethical business and corporate responsibility issues. Since 2013, he has been a member of the editorial board of Dhaka Tribune for which he is an op-ed columnist, London bureau chief and former chief editorial writer.

== Community campaigns ==
Alam is a British Bangladeshi who has campaigned with like minded colleagues on development issues. In 2003 and 2004, he edited submissions by the British Bangladeshi International Development Group when it presented evidence to highlight the importance and value of global flows of remittances before the House of Commons International Development Committee He has also spoken at events organised by the Brick Lane Circle,

== Public appointments ==
Niaz Alam sat as a director on the board of the London Pensions Fund Authority (LPFA) from 1 July 2001 – 31 August 2010. He served on the LPFA Audit committee, was chair of its remuneration committee and had a specific remit to oversee Responsible Investment and Human Rights issues,

He was first appointed to the board of the London Pensions Fund Authority (LPFA) in July 2001 by then Mayor of London Ken Livingstone. He was reappointed twice, including by subsequent mayor Boris Johnson.

Between 2000 and June 2007, he was a trustee of the campaigning charity War on Want to whose board he was elected as vice chair

He served as an external member of BBC's Appeals Advisory Committee from 2004 until 2009, when he resigned in protest at the BBC's refusal to broadcast a Disasters Emergency Committee (DEC) appeal for humanitarian relief efforts in Gaza.

=== BBC 2009 DEC Gaza Appeal resignation ===
In January 2009, Niaz Alam resigned as an external member of the BBC's Appeals Advisory Committee (on which he had sat since June 2004,) during the controversy created by the BBC's refusal to broadcast a Disasters Emergency Committee (DEC) appeal for humanitarian relief efforts in Gaza.

His resignation came amid widespread criticism of the BBC's decision from across the political spectrum including from senior politicians such as Nick Clegg, Douglas Alexander and Hazel Blears and public figures like the Archbishops of York and Canterbury.The Guardian reported that the BBC faced a revolt from its journalists over the issue, and that they had been threatened with dismissal if they spoke out.

Four days after the BBC's decision not to screen the appeal ITV, Channel 4 and Five broadcast the appeal intact on 26 January. The BBC also broadcast substantial extracts from the appeal in its TV news programmes.

In his resignation letter, a version of which was published in Private Eye, Alam, while expressing support for the BBC as an institution, criticized its decision and objected to statements that gave the impression the whole of the appeals advisory committee had been party to the BBC's decision. His letter specifically defended the impartiality of the Disasters Emergency Committee recommendation to broadcast the appeal and disputed the logic of the then Director General's justification to block the appeal on grounds of impartiality, by pointing out that 'the ultimate logic of a policy of avoiding appeals arising out of politically controversial conflicts would be for the BBC to ignore major humanitarian crises.'

Alam was interviewed on his resignation by journalist and broadcaster Peter Oborne for an edition of Channel 4's Dispatches. The BBC Trust reported in its 'Decision of the BBC Trust' document on the appeal that, 'the BBC Executive had received about 40,000 complaints about the Director General's decision'. The 2009 Gaza appeal is the only occasion on which the BBC is known to have refused an appeal broadcast request from the DEC.

The 2009 DEC Gaza appeal screened only by Channel 4 and ITV raised £8.3m. In August 2014, the BBC broadcast a new DEC aid appeal for people in Gaza, screened without similar controversy, which is reported to have raised £16m over two years.
