= Criticisms of Sky UK =

Media focus

Controversy over Sky's operation of pay TV services on Freeview began in 2006. It was claimed at various times that Sky was operating in an anti-competitive way in the British pay TV market. Similar concerns arose about Sky's procurement, distribution and charging levels of films on its Sky Movies service. Sky was exonerated by the Competition Commission in August 2012. Sky was found to have overcharged for its Sky Sports channels, and was ordered in 2010 to reduce its charges for these channels. Its terms for supplying the sports channels to other companies were also challenged in 2010–11; some of the complaints were upheld by the regulatory authorities, others were not. Another challenge, in 2009, concerned Sky's charges for listing free-to-air channels on its electronic program guide (EPG).

Gordon Brown stated in 2011 that during his term as prime minister (2007–2010), News Corporation attempted to affect government policy with regard to the BBC in pursuit of BSkyB's own commercial interests.

In June 2010, News Corporation launched a takeover bid for the remaining shares in the company. There was widespread opposition to the bid, on the grounds that it would give NewsCorp too dominant a position in the British media. The bid was withdrawn in July 2011 following the News International phone hacking scandal. The British Office of Communications (Ofcom) launched an enquiry that same month to determine whether BSkyB should continue to hold a licence to broadcast. In September 2012, Ofcom ruled that BSkyB could retain its licence.

An attempt by 21st Century Fox (the successor to News Corporation) in December 2016 to acquire the 61% share of Sky that it did not already own led to concerns again being raised as to whether it would give the Murdoch family too dominant an influence over British media. American media conglomerate Comcast entered a rival bid in April 2018, and after an auction, 21st Century Fox no longer has any stake in the company. As of October 2018, Sky UK is now wholly owned by Comcast.

== Political corruption ==
On 12 July 2011, former British Prime Minister, Gordon Brown, claimed that BSkyB's majority owner, News Corporation, attempted to affect government policy with regard to the BBC in pursuit of BSkyB's own commercial interests. He went further, in a speech in Parliament on 13 July 2011, stating:

"Mr James Murdoch, which included his cold assertion that profit not standards was what mattered in the media, underpinned an ever more aggressive News International and BSkyB agenda under his and Mrs Brooks' leadership that was brutal in its simplicity. Their aim was to cut the BBC licence fee, to force BBC online to charge for its content, for the BBC to sell off its commercial activities, to open up more national sporting events to bids from BSkyB and move them away from the BBC, to open up the cable and satellite infrastructure market, and to reduce the power of their regulator, Ofcom. I rejected those policies."

As a result of the furore over phone hacking – including all main parties in the UK Parliament agreeing on a motion to block the bid and the deal being referred to the Competition Commission – the News Corporation takeover proposal for BSkyB was dropped on 13 July 2011.

In light of the phone hacking revelations, the UK media regulator Ofcom took the decision on 8 July 2011 to be kept informed of the phone hacking investigation and to launch a "fit and proper" test, as a result of BSkyB's majority News Corp ownership (part of its obligations under the UK Broadcasting Act), in order to remain "satisfied that any person (which will include controlling directors and shareholders) holding a broadcasting licence remains fit and proper to hold those licences."

On 20 September 2012, BSkyB was found "fit and proper" to retain a licence to broadcast by the British Office of Communications (Ofcom). Ofcom stated in its report that "Ofcom’s duty to be satisfied that a licensee is fit and proper is ongoing. Should further relevant evidence become available in the future, Ofcom would need to consider that evidence in order to fulfill its duty."

== News Corporation takeover bid 2010 ==
As part of News Corporation – which has a large ownership of the UK newspaper market – BSkyB was highlighted as part of media ownership concerns in September 2010 by Claire Enders, founder of media consultancy Enders Analysis, when she wrote to Vince Cable, UK Business Secretary, in a 20-page letter stating that News Corporation's bid for the 60.9% of BSkyB they don't own would dilute media plurality and exercise "too much political influence". She also stated any such shareholder arrangement would represent a ""Berlusconi moment" for the UK", referring to Italy's concentration of media ownership.

This was followed by the same argument from the Financial Times in an editorial, who stated "a merger would give Mr Murdoch unfettered power to direct its management and cash flows" and that, consequently, this would "lock out challengers and stifle the diversity of debate." Lord Puttnam also argued the same thing, referring to the Coalition Government's desire to alter broadcast regulation and its links with News Corporation.

Pressure group 38 Degrees began a petition to Vince Cable, arguing that News Corporation (and Murdoch's) proposed shareholding would stifle a "free and diverse UK media" and affect UK broadcasting impartiality rules. Global campaigning organisation, Avaaz, also opposed the deal, with hundreds of thousands of its members signing petitions targeting the UK government.

Although the bid was "dropped after only five weeks" some media commentators presumed it had been done to "bide time" and that News Corp were "still confident" they could prove their bid was not "a serious threat to competition".

In October 2010, a group of media companies – accounting for a third of Fleet Street and the BBC – jointly wrote to Vince Cable, the Business Secretary, to lay out their reasons for the BSkyB share bid being a breach of media plurality. The BBC's contribution to the letter was subsequently attacked in a (News International owned) Times editorial.

== Competition and vertical integration ==
=== Television ===
Ofcom complained that Sky's plan to operate pay TV services on Freeview was "generating serious consumer detriment" and the National Consumer Council call Sky's plan "bad news for consumers," combined with representations from BT, Setanta, Top Up TV, and Virgin Media caused Ofcom to launch an investigation into the "features of the [UK pay TV] market, including control over content, ownership of distribution platforms, retail subscriber bases and vertical integration."

Sky repeatedly used its lawyers to lodge complaints with the soon-to-be-rival YouView service, considered by some to be a delaying tactic in order to promote its own services, especially considering its failure to complain about other services, such as Google TV.

On 13 July 2011, MP Chris Bryant stated to the House of Commons, in the Parliamentary Debate on the Rupert Murdoch and News Corporation Bid for BSkyB that the company was anti-competitive:

"The company has lots of technological innovation that only a robust entrepreneur could to bring to British society, but it has also often been profoundly anti-competitive. I believe that the bundling of channels so as to increase the profit and make it impossible for others to participate in the market is anti-competitive. I believe that the way in which the application programming interface—the operating system—has been used has been anti-competitive and that Sky has deliberately set about selling set-top boxes elsewhere, outside areas where they have proper rights. If one visits a flat in Spain where a British person lives, one finds that they mysteriously manage to have a Sky box there even though it is registered to a house in the United Kingdom."

=== Films ===
On 4 August 2010, Ofcom asked the Competition Commission to investigate concerns regarding the sale and distribution of subscription premium Pay TV films. Ofcom was concerned in particular that the way in which these films are sold and distributed created a situation in which Sky had the incentive and ability to distort competition. The result for consumers is less choice, less innovation and higher prices. Ofcom couldn't address these concerns fully using its powers and referred them to the Competition Commission. The referral related to two specific films markets. The first concerned the rights to films sold by the major Hollywood studios to broadcast films for the first time on pay TV. And the second concerned the wholesale supply of pay TV packages containing films channels, which are based on those rights. The Competition Commission had a maximum of two years to investigate and reach a decision on the concerns raised by Ofcom.

On 8 February 2011, a working paper published on the Competition Commission website, entitled "Profitability of Sky", said Sky is making "excessive profits" from its Sky Movies service. The media regulator was particularly concerned that Sky's near exclusive control over first-run films from the six major Hollywood studios has given the firm an "incentive and ability to distort competition". The Competition Commission's preliminary findings published over the summer found that Sky has a case to answer. The commission found that the prices at which Sky wholesales its film channels to other broadcasters is too high, Sky's contracts with the six major Hollywood studios mean no rival operators can afford to risk bidding for them and that Sky prevented BT and Virgin Media from developing a business selling films on demand via subscription by warehousing – or buying without using – the exclusive right to let viewers watch films on demand via subscription.

In a provisional decision published on 19 August 2011, the Competition Commission said BSkyB's contracts with the six major Hollywood studios present a significant barrier to entry to potential competitors and that prices charged by Sky are too high. The commission said the adverse effect on competition caused by Sky's film domination meant that consumers were paying £50m to £60m a year more than would otherwise be the case. Among a number of recommendations from the Competition Commission, the regulator said Sky should be restricted from signing exclusivity deals with all of the major Hollywood film studios for film rights in the so-called "first subscription pay-television window", exclusivity deals with the film giants should be weakened so rival operators can buy the rights to other distribution methods and competitors would be able to rival Sky Movies by offering their own selection of new releases.

In March 2012, the commission signalled a change of heart after deciding it needed to extend the investigation to take into account the impact of Netflix launching a UK-subscription VoD movie service in January and the move by LoveFilm to extend its rental-by-post model to offer a similar online service to customers. On 20 April 2012, Ofcom told the Competition Commission to stick to its guns and break Sky's hold on the pay-TV film market, arguing that the arrival of Netflix and LoveFilm had not altered the broadcaster's dominance.

On 23 May 2012, the Competition Commission revised its provisional findings indicating that video on demand rivals such as LoveFilm and Netflix provide a vibrant market for consumers and that BSkyB should face no action from regulators over its monopoly of UK pay-TV film rights. While the regulator dropped any proposal to act against BSkyB, it said that competition in the overall pay-TV retail market was ineffective. However, the Competition Commission said it could not act on this as the scope of the investigation was limited to the first subscription pay-TV window only. On 2 August, the Competition Commission filed its final report, upholding its revised assessment. The decision marked the first time that the Competition Commission had reversed its initial decision in a market investigation.

=== Sports ===
On 31 March 2010, Ofcom ordered BSkyB to cut the price of its premium sports channels. Sky must offer Sky Sports 1 and 2 to rival operators at 23.4% below its own monthly price per subscriber. The wholesale price for service bundles was also to be reduced by 10.5%. Sky must also offer the high definition versions of Sky Sports 1 and 2 to rivals, but Ofcom will not set the prices after accepting that HD is a relatively new innovation. Instead, Sky must make the channels available on "fair, reasonable, and non-discriminatory terms". Ofcom also asked the Competition Commission to address concerns regarding the sale and distribution of subscription video-on-demand premium movie rights. British Sky Broadcasting immediately confirmed its intention to challenge Ofcom's conclusions before the Competition Appeal Tribunal.

On 29 April 2010, BSkyB reached an interim agreement with Ofcom to offer its flagship sports channels at a lower wholesale cost to BT Vision, Top Up TV and Virgin Media. The agreement between Sky and Ofcom results in the three named Sky competitors having access to Sky Sports 1 and 2 at an Ofcom-mandated "wholesale must-offer" price for carriage on digital terrestrial and cable. However, while the interim agreement is in effect, the three named competitors will effectively continue to pay the existing rate card price, with the difference between that and the wholesale must-offer price paid into escrow. On 9 November 2010, the agreement was extended to include Real Digital, subject to Real agreeing contractual terms with BSkyB. On 1 July 2010, BT revealed plans to undercut Sky's own prices by £10 a month. Sky immediately said it would raise its own prices by £3 a month from 1 September, driving up the wholesale cost to BT and potentially forcing it to provide the channels at a loss. Sky had attempted to block Top Up TV from distributing Sky Sports 1 and 2 via a conditional-access module but was forced to allow access by Ofcom on 15 December 2010.

On 13 December 2010, Ofcom opened an investigation to consider a complaint submitted by Virgin Media in relation to the terms of wholesale supply by Sky to Virgin of Sky Sports 1 and Sky Sports 2 HD, namely that it is calculated on a per-device basis. On 24 February 2011, Ofcom issued a Draft Decision to the parties and Virgin withdrew its complaint on 16 March 2011, Ofcom therefore closed the case. On 13 December 2010, Ofcom also opened an investigation to consider a complaint submitted by BT against Sky concerning the requirement on BT to provide Sky with information on BT Visions total number of pay subscribers and total number of customers. On 29 March 2011, Ofcom concluded its assessment of BT's complaint, issuing a decision to give a direction to Sky in respect of compliance with Condition 14A of each of the Television Licensable Content Service licences for Sky Sports 1 and Sky Sports 2. The direction states that a clause in Sky's agreement for the wholesale supply of Sky Sports 1 and Sky Sports 2 to BT, requiring BT to provide Sky with BT Vision's total number of pay subscribers and total number of customers is in breach of Condition 14A(1)(d) and required that clause to be removed forthwith.

On 8 August 2012, the Competition Appeal Tribunal ruled that Ofcom's core competition concern about the way BSkyB sold its sports channels wholesale to competitors was "unfounded", namely that BSkyB had deliberately withheld wholesale supply of its premium channels from other retailers, preferring to be entirely absent and that in doing so had been acting on strategic incentives unrelated to normal commercial considerations of revenue/profit maximisation. However, BSkyB was unable to convince the tribunal that Ofcom misinterpreted its powers when it ordered a reduction in wholesale prices for Sky Sports 1 and 2.

Despite these restrictions, Sky's £1 billion budget and the collapse of Setanta Sports in 2009, left it best-placed to buy any sport not considered a free-to-air "crown jewel".

== BSkyB's EPG charges ==
According to former ITV Director of Programmes and Pearson PLC Chief Executive, Greg Dyke, an investigation by the Independent Television Commission in the early 1990s, regarding BSkyB's control of its EPG (and threats to alter the BBC's listing if it ever broadcast unencrypted) discovered "something that would have been deeply embarrassing to BSkyB if it became public". The EPG dispute was subsequently settled by BSkyB "before the ITC adjudication on our [BBC] dispute was published."

Rapture TV lodged complaints with both the Competition Commission and Ofcom concerning Sky charging free-to-air channels for the benefits of "Pay TV" listings on its EPG, despite separate carriage networks being used and free-to-air channels gaining no Pay TV benefit.

This included the criticism that Sky charges all digital broadcasters a fee to subsidise their set top boxes, which according to EU Directive 98/94 should only cover boxes which are offered to non-Sky subscribers and Pay TV subscribers on the same terms (which was disputed by Rapture TV).

This concern was highlighted by the BBC Director General, Mark Thompson, in the 2010 James MacTaggart Media Guardian Edinburgh International Television Festival, when he stated "Sky pays nothing for re-transmitting the PSB channels, despite the fact that taken together, they are by far the most watched channels they offer. On the contrary, the PSBs pay an EPG charge for the privilege of being on the satellite platform."

== Tax avoidance ==
As part of Newscorp Investments, a British holding company, BSkyB was part of a group which avoided tax over the decade up to 1999.
