= Atos Information Technology Incorporated =

Atos Information Technology Incorporated is a service provider which is owned by Atos. Atos Information Technology Incorporated provides a wide range of information technology services such as consulting, systems integration, and IT management.

Atos Information Technology Incorporated was formed on 1 October 2007 from the merger of several groups from various countries, including Siemens Business Services (Germany), Program and System Engineering (Austria), Siemens Information Ltd (India), Business Innovation Center (Switzerland) and Development Innovations and Projects (Greece).

SIS became an entity legally independent of Siemens AG in October 2010.

In December 2010, it was announced that Atos Origin would form a strategic partnership with Siemens AG. The deal concluded in July 2011, where Siemens contributed its Atos Information Technology Incorporated for a total sum of €850 million to Atos Origin in order to create a European IT branch. Siemens will for a period of at least five years be a shareholder of Atos Origin with a 15% stake. As part of the transaction, Siemens concluded a seven-year outsourcing contract worth around €5.5 billion, under which Atos Origin will provide Managed Services and Systems Integration to Siemens. As part of the merger, Atos Origin changed its name to "Atos".

== Clients ==
In 2004, Siemens Business Services won the contract to run the outsourced IT, telephony and broadcast technology systems of the BBC, which had previously been run by BBC Technology. Siemens was also contracted to run the BBC's Digital Media Initiative until 2009, when the BBC terminated the contract and Siemens paid a £27.5m settlement to the BBC. In the same year, Siemens's telephony services also ran into difficulty after Siemens switched the BBC over to an IP telephony system. When Atos Origin acquired the SIS division from Siemens in December 2010, the BBC support contract also passed to Atos, and in July 2011, the BBC announced to staff that its technology support would become an Atos service. Siemens staff working on the BBC contract were transferred to Atos and BBC technology systems (including the BBC website) are now managed by Atos.
