= Older people's associations =

Group of older people working to help the members of the group

An Older People's Association (OPA) is a group of older people working to help the members of the group, organise social activities, provide microfinance or conduct other charitable work. Organisations of this kind also enable information sharing and peer support.

OPAs were first created by HelpAge International with the first opening in 1998 in Cambodia to provide relief for seniors following the civil war. The model then spread, a 2016 study by HelpAge International found more than 1,700 OPAs in 11 countries in Asia were established since 2000. The structure and operations of OPAs differ from country to country meeting local requirements.

== Country-specific OPAs ==
=== Cambodia ===
In January 2018, Cambodia Prime Minister Hun Sen announced the creation of Older People’s Associations in each community of his nation, totaling over 1,600.

=== China ===
The government of China (PRC) provides OPAs; as of 2010 there were over 400,000 in China representing 43,890,000 people.

=== Sierra Leone ===
Age International and Restless Development created 85 OPAs in parts of Sierra Leone, giving out loans to help old people start their own businesses.
