= Age International =

UK charity

- Founded: 24 April 2012
- Type: Charity
- Headquarters: United Kingdom
- CEO: Alison Marshall
- Website: http://www.ageinternational.org.uk/

Age International is a charity in the UK, focused on supporting older people around the world. Age International is the trading name of HelpAge International UK.

Age International is a subsidiary charity of Age UK, and was founded on 24 April 2012 by Age UK and HelpAge International. Age International is a member of the HelpAge global network.

The charity works in over 20 low and middle-income countries.

== Relationship with Age UK and HelpAge International ==
Age International is a charitable subsidiary of Age UK and is a registered charity linked to Age UK. It is the UK affiliate of the HelpAge Global Network – a network of over 100 ageing organisations in more than 70 countries. As the UK affiliate of HelpAge, Age International raises awareness of HelpAge's work in the UK, raises funds in the UK, and carries out influencing and campaigning work in the UK to change global policies and practices.

== Emergency Work ==
Age International is a member of the Disasters Emergency Committee (DEC). It is the only aid organisation within the DEC to specifically target older people in emergencies. According to Age International, 26 million older people are affected by disasters every year. In 2014-15 Age International reached 155,000 older people in 23 countries with emergency response and recovery programmes.

Since 2012, Age International has responded to 7 DEC appeals: the Philippines Typhoon; the Gaza crisis; the Syria crisis; the Ebola crisis; the Nepal earthquake; the Yemen crisis; and the East Africa Crisis.

== Publications ==
In 2015, Age International published "Facing The Facts: the truth about ageing and development". This publication is a collection of essays which discuss the impact of an ageing world on international development.

In 2016, Age International and HelpAge International published "Older Citizen Monitoring: Achievements and learning". OCM involves older people monitoring the implementation of policies and services affecting their lives, and using evidence they gather to advocate for change at local, national and international levels. This report offers insight into the HelpAge network's experience of OCM since 2002.

== Age International's photo competition and exhibition ==
In 2016, Age International held a photo competition and exhibition entitled 'Strength for Life'. The organisation asked for both amateur and professional photographers to submit photos that depicted strength in older age. The winning photos were exhibited at St Martin-in-the-Fields in London.

Alongside the winning photos, the organisation also exhibited a series of photos entitled ‘The Missing Generation of Myanmar’, from awarding-winning Guardian photographer, David Levene. These photos were also published in the Guardian with an article about older people caring for their grandchildren when their parents migrate to find work and the work Age International is doing to support them.
