= Tirthankar Roy =

Indian economist

- Tirthankar Roy
- Born: Tirthankar Roy; 14 February 1960 (age 66); Santiniketan, India
- Occupations: Economist, Economic historian
- Known for: Professor of Economic History, London School of Economics

Tirthankar Roy (born 14 February 1960) is an Indian economic historian and Professor of Economic History at the London School of Economics. His work on the British Empire and modern South Asia has influenced both scholarly research and public debate. He has contributed to the development of the discipline through leadership roles in professional associations, editorships of leading journals, and the oversight of major reference works. Through his X (formerly Twitter) account, @RoyHistory1, he engages wider audiences by examining popular interpretations of history, assessing them against historical evidence, and highlighting current scholarship.

Roy's work has advanced two influential ideas in comparative development: that the economic consequences of European rule in Asia and Africa arose from the interaction of political institutions, geography, and markets rather than imperial policy alone; and that climate played a fundamental role in shaping the historical development of tropical regions.

== Biography ==
Roy received an M.A. in Economics from Visva-Bharati University in West Bengal, India and subsequently his Ph.D. from the Centre for Development Studies, Thiruvananthapuram, Kerala, India, in 1989.

== Selected publications ==
- The British Empire: An Economic History, with Leigh Gardner, London: Polity Press (forthcoming, 2026)
- Monsoon Economies: India's History in a Changing Climate, MIT Press, 2022
- Water and Development: The Troubled Economic History of the Arid Tropics, Oxford University Press, 2025
- Routledge Handbook of the Economic History of Colonialism (editor, with Ewout Frankema), 2026.
- The Cambridge Economic History of Modern South Asia (editor, with Latika Chaudhary and Anand Swamy), Cambridge University Press, 2026
- (With Anand V. Swamy) Law and the Economy in Colonial India (Chicago, United States: University of Chicago Press, 2016)
- Kerala 1956 to the Present: India’s Miracle State, with K. Ravi Raman, Cambridge University Press, 2024
- Reserve Bank of India 1997-2007, Cambridge and New Delhi: Cambridge University Press, 2023
- The Economic History of India 1857-2010, Fourth Edition, Delhi: Oxford University Press, 2020
- The Economic History of India 1707-1857, Abingdon: Routledge, 2021
- Traditional Industry in the Economy of Colonial India (Cambridge, United Kingdom: Cambridge University Press, 1999)
