= Real Digital =

Direct broadcast digital satellite television and radio service in the United Kingdom

Real Digital TV Limited
- Defunct: September 2018
- Headquarters: London, England, United Kingdom
- Area served: United Kingdom
- Key people: Dmitry Pasechnik (CEO)
- Products: Direct broadcast satellite
- Website: realdigitaltv.com

Real Digital was the brand name for a digital satellite television and radio service in the United Kingdom which was transmitted from SES S.A.'s Astra satellites located at 28.2° east (Astra 2A/2B/2D/1N) and Eutelsat's 28A satellite at 28.5°E. Real Digital had planned to launch in Ireland. The service ceased transmitting on 31 March 2012 to "undergo essential maintenance work", and promised to return in approximately seven days. On 26 April 2013, David Henry informed The Guardian that the service intended to launch in the autumn.As of January 2015, the service had not launched. The company was dissolved in September 2018.

Real Digital's main competitors were Freesat, Sky and Virgin Media.

== Channels ==
Real Digital only offered free-to-air channels which have been available on other platforms for several years. They had intended to offer pay television packages by spring 2012 which would have included Sky Sports 1 and 2 and a high definition version of Blackbelt TV. It was also planned that subscription packages were to be available on a month-by-month basis, without a contract or minimum subscription period. Additionally, it was proposed that pay-per-view services would be made available. Support for the BBC iPlayer and ITV Player video on demand services had also been announced.

== Technical information ==
The service made use of the same fleet of satellites as Freesat and Sky, Astra 28.2°E and Eutelsat 28A. This meant that any satellite dish which was positioned to receive these services was capable of receiving Real Digital, with either an additional suitable receiver or by simply swapping an old Freesat/Sky set top box with a REAL Digital STB. Providing the LNB (low-noise block downconverter) has sufficient outputs, the one dish was able to receive multiple services. For their proposed pay TV offering, Real Digital intended to use a Conax conditional access system.

Real Digital offered two kinds of set-top boxes, one with a single tuner and the other with a dual tuner PVR, which were manufactured by Fortec Star and Digital Stream.

== Criticisms ==
=== Launch ===
Before launch, the company had missed many promised launch dates. The service eventually began broadcasting on 1 October 2011.

Test boxes were received by reviewers and a small number of beta-testers in December 2011. As of April 2014 production boxes still have not reached any high street retail stores, despite an agreement being announced with Maplin Electronics, although they had been carried by select specialist online retailers.

While a number of set top boxes had been delivered to both testers and reviewers the first manufacturer Fortec Star was both late at delivering and incomplete software led to Maplin Electronics cancelling orders with Fortec Star. A number of live demonstrations to retailers showed the Real Digital EPG and TV channel lists running and the GUI was widely praised.

=== Suspension of service ===
On 31 March 2012 at midnight, the lease of the transponder on Eutelsat's Eutelsat 28A satellite ran out. The transponder was subsequently cleared, removing the EPG broadcast stream. Real Digital claim to be undergoing essential maintenance work, with the signal going offline for approximately 7 days. The move left the Real Digital beta-testers with nothing more than the DVB-S standard now and next programme information.

Oon 11 April 2012 Real Digital claimed on Facebook that work had halted due to the Easter break. Another Facebook post on 2 May 2012, denied that the service had closed but no further updates would be provided until there was definite news. On 29 May 2012, Real Digital deleted their Facebook page and removed all links to it from their website.

On 5 December 2012 Real Digital submitted a communication to the Competition Appeal Tribunal, in which Real Digital stated that it hoped to have a "soft launch" of a pay TV service in the first quarter of 2013, however this failed to occur. On 26 April 2013, David Henry informed The Guardian that the service intends to launch in the autumn, but this did not happen.

== Management ==
The company was founded by former Rapture TV boss David Henry and Information TV boss Fred Perkins. On 11 November 2011, David Henry was disqualified from acting as a company director after failing to ensure that one of his former companies paid the appropriate amount of tax. Until he resigned from the company in February 2012, Henry had been the company's managing director.

Between 2014 and 2016, General Satellite (a Russian manufacturer of set-top boxes) held a majority of the voting shares in Real Digital TV Limited. During that time, Dmitry Pasechnik was the chief executive officer of Real Digital TV Ltd.

On 4 September 2018, Real Digital TV Limited was dissolved.
