= NPR controversies =

Overview of controversies involving NPR

NPR
- Type: Public radio network
- Country: United States
- First air date: April 1971
- Availability: Global
- Founded: February 26, 1970
- Endowment: US$258 million
- Revenue: US$159 million
- Net income: US$18.9 million
- Owner: National Public Radio, Inc.
- Key people: Kevin Klose (president emeritus); Joyce Slocum (president & chief executive officer; interim); Mitch Praver (chief operating officer)
- Former names: Association of Public Radio Stations; National Educational Radio Network
- Affiliation: World Radio Network
- Official website: npr.org

NPR, full name National Public Radio, is a privately and publicly funded non-profit membership media organization that serves as a national syndicator to 797 public radio stations in the United States.

== Allegations of ideological bias ==
=== Allegations of bias for and against Israel ===
NPR has been criticized for perceived bias in its coverage of Israel and the Israeli–Palestinian conflict. The Committee for Accuracy in Middle East Reporting in America (CAMERA), an American media monitoring organization based in Boston, has been particularly critical of NPR. CAMERA director Andrea Levin has stated, "We consider NPR to be the most seriously biased mainstream media outlet," a statement that The Boston Globe describes as having "clearly gotten under her target's skin." NPR's then-ombudsman Jeffrey Dvorkin said in a 2002 interview that CAMERA used selective citations and subjective definitions of what it considers pro-Palestinian bias in formulating its findings and that he felt CAMERA's campaign was "a kind of McCarthyism, frankly, that bashes us and causes people to question our commitment to doing this story fairly. And it exacerbates the legitimate anxieties of many in the Jewish community about the survival of Israel."

CAMERA organized a boycott in 2001–2002, costing member station WBUR-FM between $1 and $2 million. The CAMERA boycott also extended to The New York Times and The Washington Post. The Anti-Defamation League and the American-Arab Anti-Discrimination Committee both criticized specific NPR reports as unbalanced, but neither accused the news organization of a consistent underlying bias. Other observers have also accused NPR of pro-Israel bias, including Fairness & Accuracy in Reporting. NPR hired a group to do outreach with both Jewish and Arab communities. An outside expert was appointed to perform quarterly self-reviews of its Israel-Palestine coverage from 2003 to 2013, finding "lack of completeness but strong factual accuracy and no systematic bias" and citing reasons why Palestinians were heard on-air less than Israelis, but overall voices from Arab countries were heard more. The 2014 Israel–Gaza conflict brought a fresh round of complaints to the ombudsman from both sides that NPR was not assigning blame to the other side, or that a particular story focused on an event or guest favorable to one side (to which the ombudsman responded that complainants ignored other balancing stories that featured the other side).

=== Allegations of elitism and the status quo ===
A 2004 FAIR study concluded that "NPR's guestlist shows the radio service relies on the same elite and influential sources that dominate mainstream commercial news, and falls short of reflecting the diversity of the American public." Further studies published in 2015 by FAIR demonstrate a lack of diversity in NPR's board members. The study found those occupying board seats of NPR and its member stations disproportionately have corporate affiliations such as investment funds, banking, consulting firms and corporate law firms with 75 percent of board members falling into such categories, with other non-corporate affiliations being current or former government officials, academia and the like. Seventy-two percent of individuals are non-Latino white males. According to NPR, it receives 35% of its funding from local member station dues and fees, 33% from corporate sponsorships, and 13% from grants from non-profits. For many member stations, funds for NPR programming dues and fees are raised from listener contributions and grants. In 2014, NPR acknowledged a lack of cultural and ethnic diversity among guests, viewpoints and topics covered as well as the composition of their newsroom and board members.

Noam Chomsky has criticized NPR as being biased toward ideological power and the status quo. He alleges that the parameters of debate on a given topic are consciously curtailed. He says that since the network maintains studios in ideological centers of opinion such as Washington, the network must carefully consider what kinds of acceptable dissenting views. Thus, political pragmatism, perhaps induced by fear of offending public officials who control some of NPR's funding (via CPB), often determines what views are suitable for broadcast, meaning that opinions critical of the structures of national-interest-based foreign policy, capitalism, and government bureaucracies (entailed by so-called "radical" or "activist" politics) usually do not make it to air.

=== Study results ===
Consumers of information from NPR contend that NPR does its job well. A study conducted in 2003 by the polling firm Knowledge Networks and the University of Maryland's Program on International Policy Attitudes (University of Maryland at College Park) showed that those who get their news and information from public broadcasting (NPR and PBS – Public Broadcasting Service) are better informed than those whose data comes from other media outlets. In one study, NPR and PBS audiences had a more accurate understanding of the events in Iraq versus all audiences for cable and broadcast TV networks and the print media.

=== Allegations by Uri Berliner ===
On April 9, 2024, The Free Press published an essay by NPR senior business editor Uri Berliner in which he criticized NPR for having "coalesced around the progressive worldview", and that the publication had sought "to damage or topple Trump’s presidency". Berliner was given a five-day suspension without pay on 12 April for failing to secure approval for outside work. He resigned from NPR on 17 April in an email to NPR CEO Katherine Maher accusing Maher of holding "divisive" views. He then started work at The Free Press in June 2024.

== Controversies ==
=== Mumia Abu-Jamal commentaries ===
In 1994, NPR arranged to air commentaries by convicted murderer Mumia Abu-Jamal on All Things Considered, but canceled them after the Fraternal Order of Police and members of the United States Congress objected to the airing.

=== Andrei Codrescu comment ===
On the December 19, 1995, broadcast of All Things Considered, NPR commentator Andrei Codrescu reported that some Christians believe in a "rapture" and 4 million will ascend to Heaven immediately. He continued, "The evaporation of 4 million who believe this crap would leave the world an instantly better place." NPR subsequently apologized for Codrescu's comment, saying, "Those remarks offended listeners and crossed a line of taste and tolerance that we should have defended with greater vigilance." Executive Producer Ellen Weiss said the incident would not sever NPR's relationship with Codrescu.

=== Juan Williams termination ===
On October 20, 2010, NPR terminated Senior News Analyst Juan Williams's independent contract after comments about Muslims which were referred to as "inconsistent with our editorial standards and practices, and undermined his credibility as a news analyst with NPR". Williams' remarks were made on the Fox News Channel's The O'Reilly Factor where he concurred with statements suggesting that the United States was facing a "Muslim dilemma". He also said, "I mean, look, Bill, I'm not a bigot. You know the kind of books I've written about the civil rights movement in this country. But when I get on the plane, I got to tell you, if I see people who are in Muslim garb and I think, you know, they are identifying themselves first and foremost as Muslims, I get worried. I get nervous." Furthermore, referring to comments made by a Pakistani immigrant who pleaded guilty to trying to plant a car bomb in Times Square, Williams said "He said the war with Muslims, America's war is just beginning, first drop of blood. I don't think there's any way to get away from these facts."

NPR CEO Vivian Schiller defended NPR's decision by asserting that Williams has a history of making controversial comments in violation of NPR's ethics policy, with commentary expressed on Fox News and in newspaper opinion pieces. He was previously admonished for comments he made about US First-Lady Michelle Obama, "she's got this Stokely Carmichael in a designer dress thing going. If she starts talking ... her instinct is to start with this blame America, you know, I'm the victim. If that stuff starts to coming out, people will go bananas and she'll go from being the new Jackie O. to being something of an albatross." This was far from an isolated incident, and Williams’ appearances on Fox News had caused repeated problems for NPR over the last few years. Williams had also "been warned several times that [Bill] O’Reilly is a professional provocateur and to be careful." Williams and others have said that in firing him, NPR exhibited a double standard by not firing other NPR people like Andrei Codrescu for his comment about Christians who believe in a rapture and Nina Totenberg for her 1995 comments about Senator Jesse Helms and AIDS.

After NPR announced his ouster, Alicia Shepard, NPR's ombudsman, said that the firing could have been handled better. She opined that Williams could have been given a chance to explain himself to NPR's management or been suspended pending review of his case. However, she agreed with NPR's decision, saying "the fact remains that NPR must uphold its journalistic standards, which, after all, provide the basis that earned public radio's reputation for quality." "Probably the better thing for NPR to have done is to have said 'Juan the situation is not working,'" Shepard said, noting that Williams could have been given a choice: "If he wanted to stay at NPR, he would have to stop doing commentary on Fox News Channel. Or, if he preferred to continue with Fox, he and NPR could part ways." Schiller told an audience at the Atlanta Press Club that Williams should have kept his feelings about Muslims between himself and "his psychiatrist or his publicist". Later, Schiller placed a post on the NPR website "I spoke hastily and I apologize to Juan and others for my thoughtless remark”. Although a number of prominent conservatives, including Jim DeMint, Sarah Palin, and Newt Gingrich have renewed long-standing calls that NPR lose federal funding that it currently receives, donations from NPR listener-members during NPR's October fundraising drive remained unaffected in the first 3 days. FOX News granted Williams a new $2 million, three-year contract with an expanded role at their network. FOX has been heavily promoting the incident "with hourly reports about the controversy on both its news and opinion programs." Bill O'Reilly has accused NPR of bias in firing Williams.

It was determined after an external review by legal counsel that Williams was properly terminated according to the terms of his contract, which gave both parties the right to terminate on 30 days' notice for any reason, and the termination was not the result of special-interest group or donor pressure. The board of directors also adopted recommendations and remedial measures designed to address issues that surfaced with the review, including new internal procedures concerning personnel and on-air talent decisions, and disciplinary action with respect to certain management employees involved in the termination. These measures included Ellen Weiss, the Senior Vice President who fired Juan Williams, stepping down on January 6, 2011, under what is believed to be substantial pressure from more senior management, and CEO Vivian Schiller not being awarded her 2010 bonus.

=== Ronald Schiller ===
In March 2011, James O'Keefe sent partners Simon Templar (a pen name not to be confused with the fictional character) and Shaughn Adeleye to secretly record their discussion with Ronald Schiller, NPR's then-senior vice president for fundraising, and his associate, the senior director of institutional giving at NPR, Betsy Liley. The NPR executives were misled that they would be meeting with representatives of a self-described Muslim group, Muslim Education Action Center (MEAC), that wished to donate money to NPR, "partly out of concern for the defunding process the Republicans are trying to engage in." On the recording, Schiller indicates that he is sharing his personal point of view, not NPR's, saying he'll "talk personally, as opposed to wearing my NPR hat"; then he contrasted the fiscally conservative Republican party of old that didn't get involved in people's personal and family lives with "the current Republican Party, particularly the Tea Party, that is fanatically involved in people's personal lives and very fundamental Christian—I wouldn't even call it Christian. It's this weird evangelical kind of move." Subsequent analysis of the raw videos showed that the clips were heavily edited to present only one point of view, and that much of the context of the conversation was changed.

According to NPR, Schiller's comments are in direct conflict with NPR's official position and they called his comments appalling. They also stated that, "The fraudulent organization represented in this video repeatedly pressed us to accept a $5 million check with no strings attached, which we repeatedly refused to accept." A second recording released a couple of days later by O'Keefe showed that after phone and e-mail communications, Betsy Liley checked with senior management and said that although MEAC had been cleared to legally make donations anonymously, additional background information was required before a donation could be accepted, including an IRS Form 990. Schiller had submitted his resignation on January 24, before the recorded meeting, and announced a week before the video was released that he was leaving NPR for a position at the Aspen Institute, but he was immediately put on "administrative leave" by NPR. The next day NPR's CEO Vivian Schiller (who is not related) announced she was resigning her position, effective immediately. Ronald Schiller made his resignation from NPR effective immediately on the evening of the video's release and the next day decided also to cede his new position at the Aspen Institute.

=== Vivian Schiller ===
NPR announced that CEO Vivian Schiller had resigned after controversial comments made by NPR's former top fundraising executive, Ron Schiller (no relation to Vivian), came to light in a secret video. A statement released in March 2011 by NPR's board of directors said the resignation by Vivian Schiller, who also faced criticism for the dismissal of commentator Juan Williams, was accepted. However, NPR media correspondent David Folkenflik told Morning Edition host Renee Montagne that his sources were telling him that the CEO was forced out.

Dave Edwards, chairman of NPR's board, said directors came to the conclusion that the controversies under Schiller's watch had become such a distraction that she could no longer effectively lead the organization. She had told the directors that they should take the action they felt was appropriate, and Edwards said the board decided it would be best for her to depart.

According to a CEO succession plan adopted by the board in 2009, Joyce Slocum, SVP of legal affairs and general counsel, was appointed to the position of interim CEO. The board established an executive transition committee to develop a time frame and process for the recruitment and selection of new leadership.

=== Michael Oreskes sexual harassment allegations ===
In October 2017, two journalists accused Michael Oreskes of sexual harassment while working as the Washington, DC bureau chief for The New York Times during the 1990s. Oreskes became NPR's senior vice president of news and editorial director in 2015. After a report on the accusations was published in The Washington Post, NPR put Oreskes on administrative leave. Rebecca Hersher, an NPR journalist, went on the record about attending a career counseling session in October 2015, in which she says Oreskes discussed having sex with his girlfriend. At the time, Hersher filed a complaint against Oreskes, and NPR reprimanded him for his behavior. His resignation was requested by NPR's chief executive Jarl Mohn, and Oreskes left NPR on November 1, 2017. Oreskes issued a statement saying he was "deeply sorry to the people I hurt. My behavior was wrong and inexcusable, and I accept full responsibility." He reimbursed NPR $1,800 in improper expense account charges.

The Washington Post later reported that multiple sexual abuse allegations against Oreskes were ignored by NPR management during his two years there, and that NPR's handling of Oreskes had prompted a "virtual rebellion" among staffers. Staffers told CNN's Brian Stelter that Oreskes created an oppressive atmosphere by abusing his position to meet young women. A law firm was retained to probe NPR's handling of Oreskes, and Mohn conceded he did not act fast enough.

The law firm's report, issued in February 2018, found that questions were raised about Oreskes' treatment of women even before he was hired, and that reports of misconduct were relayed to management right up to his firing. It found that repeated warnings to top management about his behavior toward women and expense account, which he used to pay for meetings with women, were ineffective, and that there was a high level of mistrust toward management.

=== Anti-Hindu statement from producer ===
In 2019, an NPR producer based in Delhi, Furkan Khan, was forced to resign from her job following a backlash over a tweet in which she described Hindus as "piss drinking and dung worshipping" and stated that they should "give up Hinduism".

=== Mike Pompeo and Mary Louise Kelly ===
During the middle of the first impeachment trial of Donald Trump, on January 24, 2020, Mary Louise Kelly, a host of NPR's All Things Considered, interviewed Secretary of State Mike Pompeo. After asking several questions about Iran–United States relations, Kelly asked why Pompeo had not supported Ambassador Marie Yovanovitch during the Trump–Ukraine scandal. Pompeo replied that he had always supported every State Department employee although he was unable or unwilling to cite a single example of support for Yovanovitch.

Kelly says that Pompeo ended the interview and took her to a private room where he yelled at her, using several expletives. He asked her if she could find Ukraine on a map; she says she pointed to Ukraine, while he claims she pointed to Bangladesh. In a move the State Department Correspondents' Association described as "retaliation," the State Department then denied NPR correspondent Michele Kelemen a seat on Pompeo's flight to Europe and Central Asia. President Donald Trump praised Pompeo for the interview while suggesting he would cut funding for NPR.

After the incident, NPR spokeswoman Isabel Lara emailed Washington Post columnist Eric Wemple "Donations are up!"

=== Supreme Court COVID face mask reporting ===
In January 2021, NPR legal affairs correspondent Nina Totenberg reported that some U.S. Supreme Court justices were not willing to wear a face mask to protect Justice Sonia Sotomayor, who was at increased COVID-19 risk due to her health history. The court released a statement challenging Totenberg's reporting, claiming all justices were wearing personal protective equipment in the courtroom. In response, the network's public editor wrote, "Totenberg's story merits a clarification, but not a correction. After talking to Totenberg and reading all justices' statements, I believe her reporting was solid, but her word choice was misleading."

=== Labeling by Twitter as government-funded media ===
In April 2023, Twitter made the decision to label NPR, as well as the PBS, BBC, and Voice of America as government-funded media outlets, following backlash from critics who accused the platform of bias. Twitter initially labeled accounts linked to countries like Russia and China but faced criticism for not applying the same labels to media organizations from Western countries. In response, the company expanded its policy to include these outlets as well.

Twitter claimed it aimed to provide transparency and context to users about the sources of information they encountered on the platform. The company stated that the labels were not meant to undermine the credibility of these media organizations but rather to offer users a better understanding of the potential affiliations and biases of the information they consume.

NPR deactivated its Twitter account as of April 12, 2023, in a direct response to Twitter's labeling of the outlet.
