= Tapeless production =

Recording to a medium other than audio or videotape

In the field of professional broadcasting, an end-to-end workflow (from ingest to playout) is called tapeless when part, or all of it, is made without any use of audio tape recorders or videotape machines; video and audio sources being ingested, recorded, edited and played out entirely on digital video systems.

Digital tapeless recording refers to any recording method using digital data recorded to a medium other than audio/videotape (usually hard disk, CD-style or flash memory). It is widely used in sound recording on computers or specialized workstations, and is also used in video, both by low-end camcorder users who want light, silent equipment, and by high-end video and film producers working in high-definition video at such a high bitrate that tape cannot keep up. It is also common on mid-to-high end portable voice recorders, which record to formats such as MP3 or ATRAC.

In the 30 years from the mid-1980s to 2015, tapeless production has moved from being an expensive high-end niche application to being the default workflow for professional production. The availability of low cost disk and high-powered CPUs and GPUs in modern computers has also made it affordable for even amateur productions, and often cheaper than solutions using professional tape formats.

In the audio world, however, some producers have returned to all-analog, even vintage, recording equipment for what they describe as a softer, "warmer" sound, at the cost of precise sound replication. This is less common in video production, where vintage equipment often no longer works or cannot connect to current systems.

== See also ==
- Non-linear editing system
- Tapeless camcorder
