= Disasters Emergency Committee =

Group of UK charities

The Disasters Emergency Committee (DEC) is an umbrella group of UK charities which coordinates and launches collective appeals to raise funds to provide emergency aid and rapid relief to people caught up in disasters and humanitarian crises around the world. Since being formed in 1963, the DEC has had strong relationships with major UK broadcasters in particular the BBC and ITV, who provide airtime to broadcast emergency appeals upon its recommendation. It is a member of the global Emergency Appeals Alliance, which reports that since its first television appeal in 1966, the DEC has raised over £1.4 billion.

The DEC is a registered charity (charity no: 1062638) with 15 charity members all with associated disaster relief capabilities such as providing clean water, humanitarian aid and medical care.

The charity came to increased prominence during the 2022 Russian invasion of Ukraine when people donated to the Ukraine Humanitarian Appeal.

== Notable DEC appeals ==
The first DEC appeal was run for victims of an earthquake in Turkey in 1966.

In 2004, the Disasters Emergency Committee (DEC) ran UK television appeals and telephone lines for donations following the 2004 Indian Ocean earthquake and tsunami, which raised a record £392m in public donations,

Between January and July 2010, the DEC appealed for donations following the 2010 Haiti earthquake, raising a total of £107 million.

On 22 January 2009, the BBC declined a request from the DEC to screen an appeal to raise money to aid relief efforts for victims of conflict in the Gaza Strip, as they felt supporting the appeal would effectively mean the BBC taking a political stance on the Gaza conflict. This decision was the object of considerable controversy within the BBC as it is the only time the BBC is known to have refused such a request from the DEC; the 2009 Gaza appeal in question was screened by Channel 4 and ITV and raised £8.3m. Since then, the BBC has broadcast other DEC aid appeals for people in Gaza, without similar controversy. The DEC August 2014 Gaza appeal shown by the BBC helped to raise £19m over two years.

On the launch of its appeal in October 2017 for Rohingya refugees fleeing Myanmar to Bangladesh, the UK Government pledged to double public donations up to £3 million. Similarly, a pledge to match public donations up to £20 million was made by the UK Government in 2022 in response to the Russian invasion of Ukraine.

In 2024, an attempted DEC appeal for humanitarian aid to address the Gaza humanitarian crisis during the Israeli invasion of the Gaza Strip was delayed by the BBC, with some reporting this was due to fears a backlash from supporters of Israel in its war with Hamas.

== Notable fundraising events for the Ukraine Humanitarian Appeal ==
In March 2022, Royal Ballet star Ivan Putrov directed Dance For Ukraine alongside Romanian ballet dancer Alina Cojocaru. The event took place at the London Coliseum on 19 March and raised £140,000 for DEC's Ukraine Humanitarian Appeal.

On 29 March 2022, Concert for Ukraine took place at Resorts World Arena in Birmingham and it aired on ITV. It was presented by Capital FM presenter Roman Kemp, Marvin Humes and Emma Bunton. ITV pledged people to donate to DEC's Ukraine Humanitarian Appeal. Artists included Snow Patrol, Tom Odell, Ed Sheeran and Camila Cabello and the show ran for two hours. More than £13.4 million was donated by midday the day after the concert.

== Member charities of the Disasters Emergency Committee ==
As of April 2026, the committee's member organisations are:

- Action Against Hunger
- ActionAid
- Age International
- British Red Cross
- CAFOD
- CARE International
- Christian Aid
- Concern Worldwide
- International Rescue Committee
- Islamic Relief
- Oxfam
- Plan International
- Save the Children
- Tearfund
- World Vision

== List of DEC appeals ==
Recent DEC appeals.

Date	Location	Appeal reason	Amount raised
August 1966	Turkey	Earthquake	£560,000
June 1967	Middle East	War	£160,000
February 1968	Vietnam	War	£360,000
September 1968	Iran	Earthquake	£210,000
November 1968	Nigeria	War	£240,000
October 1969	Algeria and Tunisia	Floods	£90,000
November 1969	Yugoslavia	Earthquake	£60,000
March 1970	Turkey	Earthquake	£370,000
June 1970	Peru	Earthquake	£230,000
June 1970	Romania	Floods	£110,000
November 1970	East Pakistan (Bangladesh)	Cyclone	£1,490,000
June 1971	India and Pakistan	War	£1,420,000
December 1972	Nicaragua	Earthquake	£340,000
October 1973	Ethiopia and the Sahel	Drought	£1,540,000
September 1974	Honduras	Hurricane	£350,000
February 1976	Guatemala	Earthquake	£1,300,000
September 1979	Indo-China	War	£560,000
November 1979	India	Cyclone	£870,000
June 1980	East Africa	Drought	£6,100,000
March 1982	Central America	War	£430,000
July 1982	Lebanon	War	£1,030,000
March 1983	Ethiopia	Famine	£1,970,000
June 1984	Africa	Famine	£9,520,000
October 1984	Ethiopia	Famine	£5,250,000
May 1985	Bangladesh	Cyclone	£1,400,000
June 1987	Mozambique	War/Drought	£2,480,000
December 1987	Ethiopia	Famine	£2,690,000
August 1988	Sudan	Floods	£8,890,000
September 1988	Bangladesh	Floods	£5,810,000
September 1988	Caribbean	Hurricane	£1,000,000
December 1989	Ethiopia	Famine	£10,240,000
September 1990	Gulf	War	£3,490,000
January 1991	Africa		£7,930,000
May 1991	Bangladesh	Cyclone	£3,520,000
June 1991	Africa		£2,600,000
September 1992	Africa		£17,300,000
October 1993	Africa		£2,530,000
February 1994	Yugoslavia	War	£2,600,000
May 1994	Rwanda	War/Genocide	£37,000,000
May 1998	Sudan	Famine	£10,500,000
September 1998	Bangladesh	Floods	£5,500,000
November 1998	Central America	Hurricane	£18,500,000
April 1999	Kosovo	War	£53,000,000
November 1999	India	Cyclone	£7,000,000
March 2000	Mozambique	Floods	£30,000,000
February 2001	India	Earthquake	£24,000,000
January 2002	DR Congo	Volcano	£4,650,000
July 2002	Southern Africa	Famine	£16,000,000
August 2003	Liberia	War	£2,500,000
July 2004	Sudan	War	£35,000,000
December 2004	Asia	Tsunami/Earthquake	£392,000,000
August 2005	Niger	Famine	£32,000,000
October 2005	India and Pakistan	Earthquake	£59,000,000
May 2007	Darfur and Chad	War	£13,600,000
November 2007	Bangladesh	Cyclone	£9,000,000
May 2008	Myanmar (Burma)	Cyclone	£19,500,000
November 2008	DR Congo	War	£10,500,000
January 2009	Gaza	War	£8,300,000
October 2009	Indonesia, Philippines, Vietnam	Typhoon/Earthquake/Typhoon	£9,300,000
January 2010	Haiti	Earthquake	£107,000,000
August 2010	Pakistan	Floods	£71,000,000
July 2011	East Africa	Drought/Famine	£79,000,000
March 2013	Syria	War	£27,000,000
November 2013	Philippines	Typhoon	£96,000,000
August 2014	Gaza	War	£19,000,000
October 2014	West Africa	Epidemic (Ebola)	£37,000,000
April 2015	Nepal	Earthquake	£87,000,000
December 2016	Yemen	War/Famine	£30,000,000
March 2017	East Africa	Drought/Famine	£66,000,000
October 2017	Bangladesh (Rohingya from Myanmar)	Refugees/Genocide	£30,000,000
October 2018	Indonesia	Tsunami/Earthquake/Landslide	£29,000,000
March 2019	Mozambique, Malawi, Zimbabwe	Cyclone	£43,000,000
July 2020	Afghanistan, Bangladesh, DR Congo, India, Somalia, South Sudan, Syria, Yemen	Pandemic (COVID-19)	£62,000,000
December 2021	Afghanistan	COVID-19/Famine	£51,800,000
March 2022	Ukraine	War	£445,000,000
September 2022	Pakistan	Floods	£50,000,000
February 2023	Turkey, Syria	Earthquake	£160,000,000
October 2024	Gaza, Lebanon, West Bank, Syria	War/Famine	£65,000,000 at 18 March 2026 – ongoing
April 2025	Myanmar	Earthquake	£28,000,000
July 2026	Venezuela	Earthquake	£15,000,000 at 14 July 2026 – ongoing
