= Brick Lane Circle =

Organisation in London, England

The Brick Lane Circle is a voluntary organisation based in Brick Lane, in the Tower Hamlets, London, which organises talks, seminars and conferences on subjects relating to Bangladesh and Bangladeshis abroad. Its events are free and open to all members of the public.

Since 2010, it has organised an annual Bengal History Week based at the Whitechapel Idea Store (library) each October.

Its East India company project has been one of its more popular topics. This hosted talks by notable historians of the East India Company such as Nick Robins. At the same time it also worked with such experts to help local young people and other novice authors in London to write and publish their own research and work on the company's history. It won an award from Channel S in 2011 for supporting academic excellence.

Over the years, its projects have been provided with assistance and support by the Heritage Lottery Fund, British Library, Victoria & Albert Museum, Museum of London, National Maritime Museum and London Metropolitan Archives.

Dr Muhammad Ahmedullah is the Secretary of the organisation and main point of contact. Its website lists a number of organisations based in Tower Hamlets as supporters for providing venues free of charge, notably the Brady Community Arts Centre, Rich Mix Centre, Jagonari Centre, and Kobi Nazrul Centre.
