= King's speech =

King's speech may refer to:

- Speech from the throne when the monarch is male, delivered by a king (or representative) outlining his government's agenda
  - State Opening of Parliament, beginning of a session of the Parliament of the United Kingdom
- Royal Christmas Message, broadcast made by the sovereign of the Commonwealth realms to the Commonwealth of Nations each Christmas
- Special address by the British monarch, made by the sovereign of the Commonwealth realms at times of significant national or royal events
- A King's Speech, a 2009 radio play about King George VI
- The King's Speech, a 2010 film about King George VI
  - The King's Speech (play), a 2012 stage play based on the film
- The King's Speech: How One Man Saved the British Monarchy, a biography by Peter Conradi and Mark Logue
