= List of accolades received by The King's Speech =

The King's Speech awards and nominations
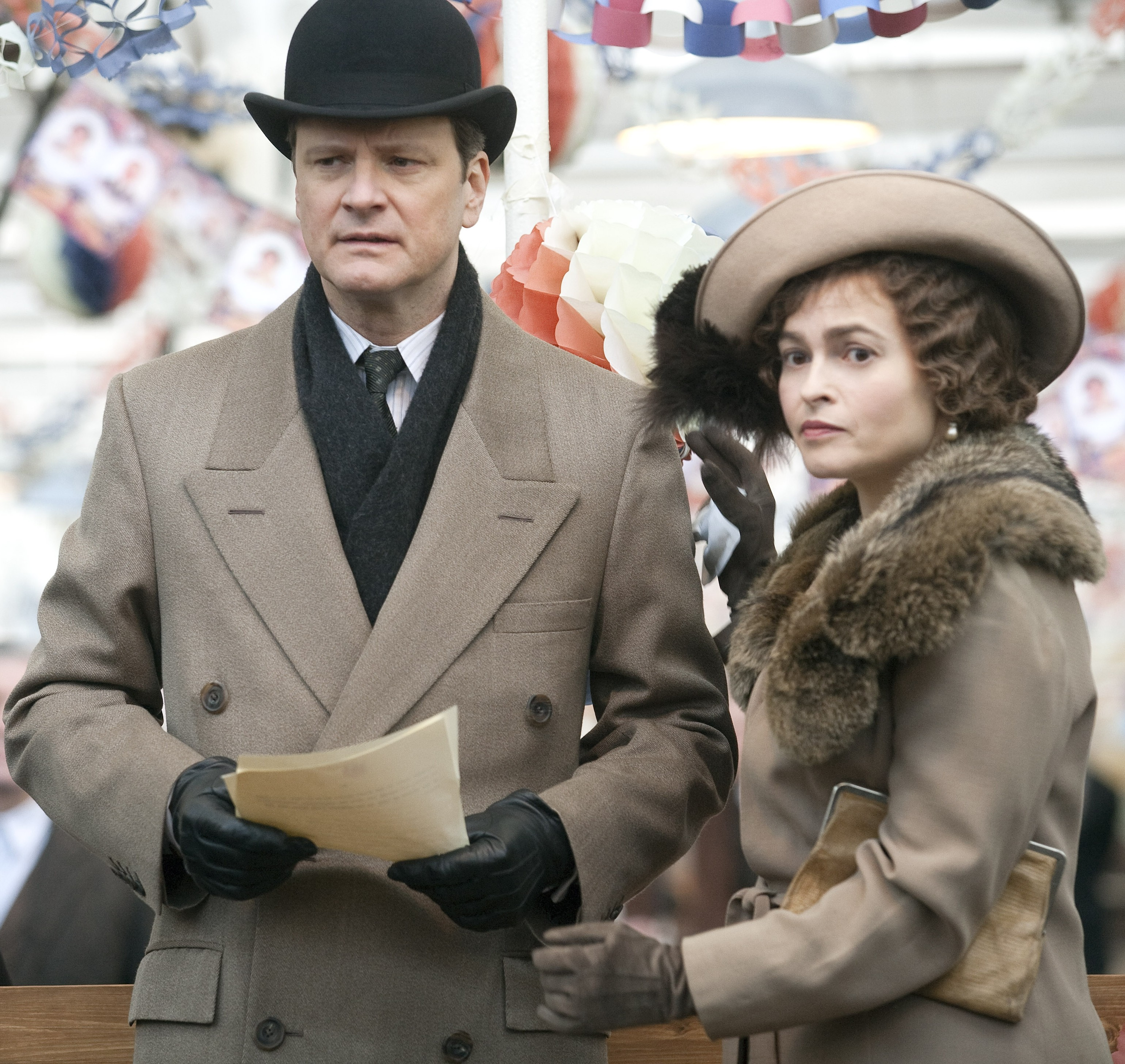
- Colin Firth (left) and Helena Bonham Carter in a scene from The King's Speech
Awards and nominations
Award	Wins	Nominations
Academy of Motion Picture Arts and Sciences	4	12
Alliance of Women Film Journalists	1	7
American Cinema Editors	0	1
American Film Institute	1	1
American Society of Cinematographers	0	1
Art Directors Guild	1	1
Austin Film Critics Association	1	1
British Academy of Film and Television Arts	7	14
British Independent Film Awards	6	9
Chicago Film Critics Association	1	6
Costume Designers Guild	1	1
Critics' Choice Awards	2	11
Dallas–Fort Worth Film Critics Association Awards	0	5
Detroit Film Society	1	6
Directors Guild of America	1	1
Empire Awards	1	5
European Film Awards	3	4
Evening Standard British Film Awards	0	3
Film Independent Spirit Awards	1	1
Florida Film Critics Circle	1	1
Golden Globe Awards	1	7
Goya Awards	1	1
Hamptons International Film Festival	1	1
Hollywood Film Festival	1	1
Houston Film Critics Society	0	4
International Film Music Critics Association Awards	1	2
Leeds International Film Festival	1	0
London Film Critics Circle	3	7
Los Angeles Film Critics Association	1	1
Motion Picture Sound Editors	0	1
National Board of Review	1	1
National Movie Awards	3	5
National Society of Film Critics Awards	1	3
New York Film Critics Circle Awards	1	1
Online Film Critics Society	1	3
Producers Guild of America	1	1
San Diego Film Critics Society	0	4
San Francisco Film Critics Circle Awards	2	2
Santa Barbara International Film Festival	1	1
Satellite Awards	2	6
Screen Actors Guild	2	4
St. Louis Film Critics Association	2	7
Toronto Film Critics Association	0	3
Toronto International Film Festival	1	1
Vancouver Film Critics Circle Award	1	2
Washington D.C. Area Film Critics Association	1	4
Women Film Critics Circle	2	2

Totals (Note: Certain award groups do not simply award one winner. They acknowledge several different recipients, have runners-up, and have third place. Since this is a specific recognition and is different from losing an award, runner-up mentions are considered wins in this award tally. For simplification and to avoid errors, each award in this list has been presumed to have had a prior nomination.)
- Wins: 70
- Nominations: 185

The King's Speech is a 2010 British historical drama film directed by Tom Hooper, from a script by David Seidler. The film stars Colin Firth as George (both Duke of York and later king), Helena Bonham Carter as his wife Queen Elizabeth, and Geoffrey Rush as the speech therapist Lionel Logue. The film focuses on the attempts by George to overcome his stutter, a process in which Logue was instrumental.

The King's Speech premiered on 6 September 2010 at the Telluride Film Festival in the United States, and was screened at the 2010 Toronto International Film Festival on 10 September 2010, where it received a standing ovation and won the People's Choice Award. It was eventually released in the UK on 7 January 2011. The film grossed a worldwide total at the box office of over $414 million on a production budget of £8 million ($15 million). After five weeks on UK release, it was identified as the most successful independent British film ever. It appeared in the Top Ten lists of more than twenty reviewers for the best films of 2010.

At the 83rd Academy Awards, the film received a total of twelve award nominations, more than any other film, and won four: Best Picture, Best Director (Hooper), Best Original Screenplay (Seidler), and Best Actor (Firth). At the 68th Golden Globe Awards, the film received seven nominations, more than any other nominee, but only Firth won an award, for Best Actor. Hooper also won for Best Director at the 63rd Directors Guild of America Awards. At the 17th Screen Actors Guild Awards, Firth won the Best Actor award and the cast won Best Ensemble. At the 64th British Academy Film Awards, it won seven awards out of fourteen nominations, more than any other film, consisting of Best Film, Outstanding British Film, Best Actor (Firth), Best Supporting Actor (Rush), Best Supporting Actress (Bonham Carter), Best Original Screenplay (Seidler), and Best Music (Alexandre Desplat).

== Accolades ==
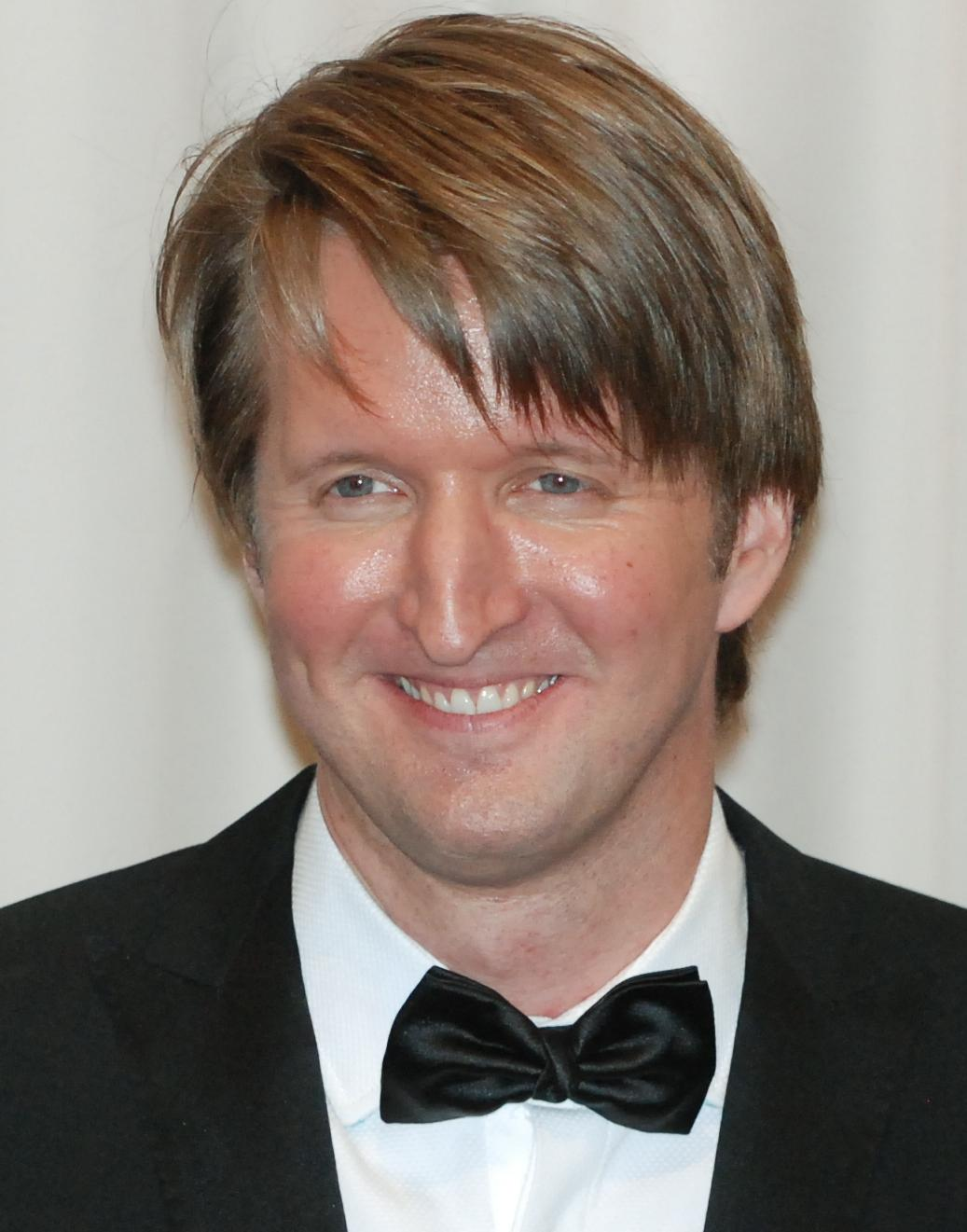
The director Tom Hooper in 2011

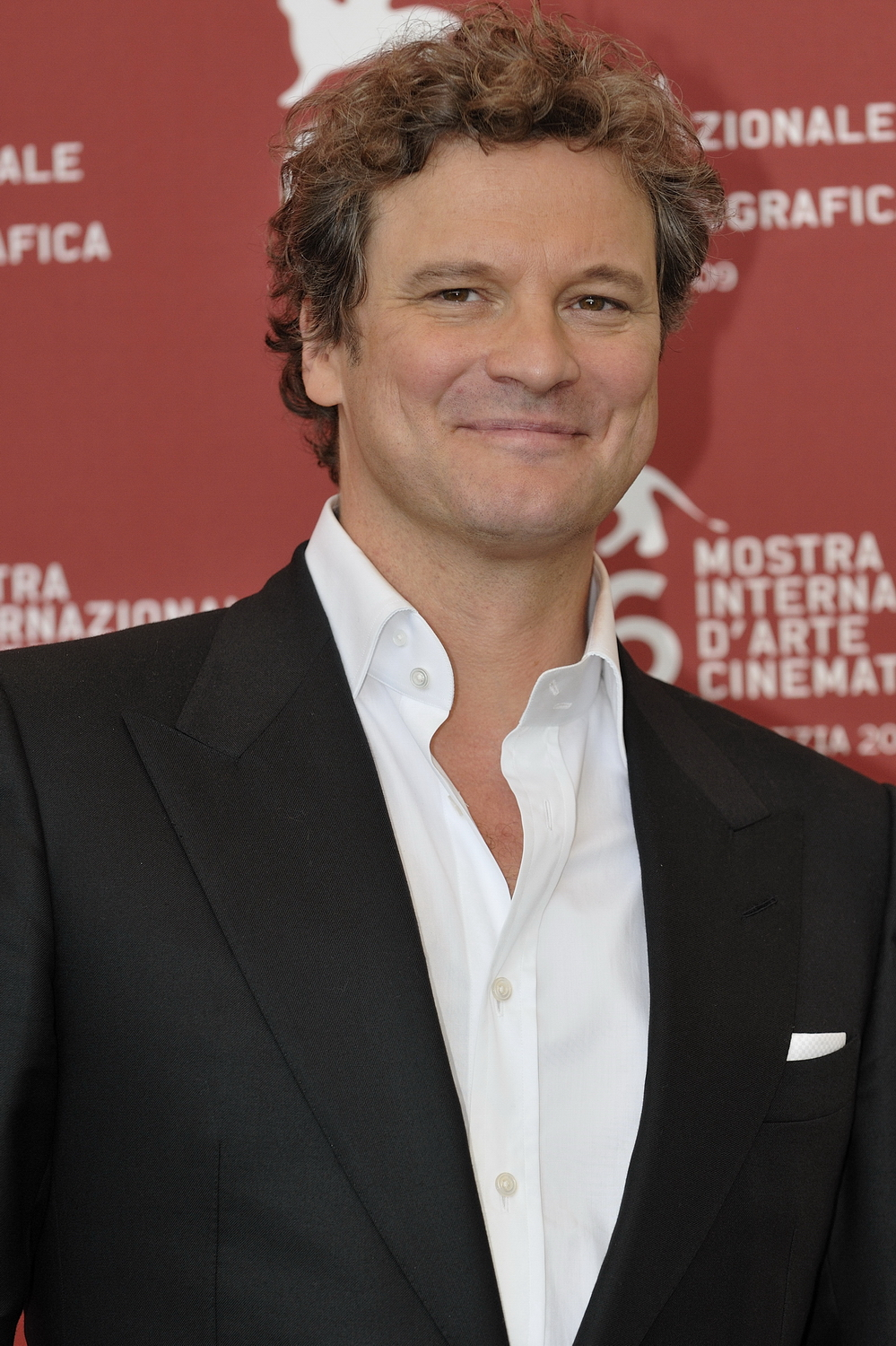
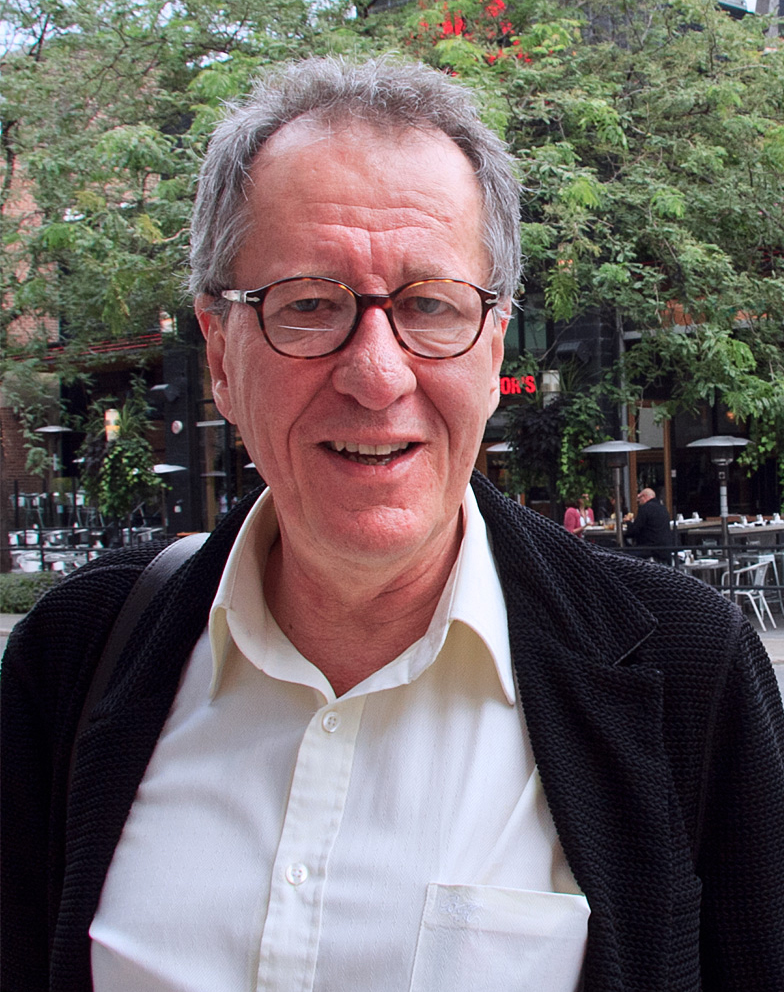
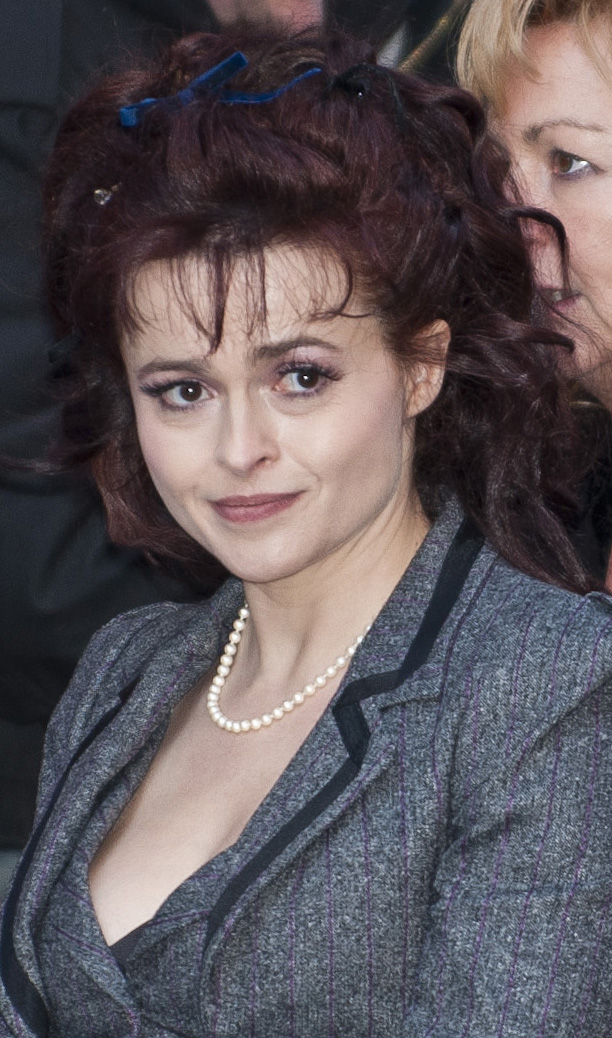
Top: Colin Firth in 2009; Middle: Geoffrey Rush in 2011; Bottom: Helena Bonham Carter in 2011

Award	Date of ceremony	Category	Recipient(s)	Result	Ref.
Academy Awards	27 February 2011	Best Picture	Iain Canning, Emile Sherman, Gareth Unwin	Won	
Academy Awards	27 February 2011	Best Director	Tom Hooper	Won	
Academy Awards	27 February 2011	Best Actor	Colin Firth	Won	
Academy Awards	27 February 2011	Best Supporting Actor	Geoffrey Rush	Nominated	
Academy Awards	27 February 2011	Best Supporting Actress	Helena Bonham Carter	Nominated	
Academy Awards	27 February 2011	Best Original Screenplay	David Seidler	Won	
Academy Awards	27 February 2011	Best Art Direction	Eve Stewart, Judy Farr	Nominated	
Academy Awards	27 February 2011	Best Cinematography	Danny Cohen	Nominated	
Academy Awards	27 February 2011	Best Costume Design	Jenny Beavan	Nominated	
Academy Awards	27 February 2011	Best Film Editing	Tariq Anwar	Nominated	
Academy Awards	27 February 2011	Best Original Score	Alexandre Desplat	Nominated	
Academy Awards	27 February 2011	Best Sound Mixing	Paul Hamblin, Martin Jensen, John Midgley	Nominated	
Alliance of Women Film Journalists Awards	10 January 2011	Best Film		Nominated	
Alliance of Women Film Journalists Awards	10 January 2011	Best Original Screenplay	David Seidler	Nominated	
Alliance of Women Film Journalists Awards	10 January 2011	Best Ensemble Cast		Nominated	
Alliance of Women Film Journalists Awards	10 January 2011	Best Director	Tom Hooper	Nominated	
Alliance of Women Film Journalists Awards	10 January 2011	Best Actor	Colin Firth	Won	
Alliance of Women Film Journalists Awards	10 January 2011	Best Supporting Actress	Helena Bonham Carter	Nominated	
Alliance of Women Film Journalists Awards	10 January 2011	Best Supporting Actor	Geoffrey Rush	Nominated	
American Cinema Editors	19 February 2011	Best Edited Feature Film – Dramatic	Tariq Anwar	Nominated	
American Film Institute Awards	14 January 2011	AFI Special Award		Won	
American Society of Cinematographers	13 February 2011	Outstanding Achievement in Cinematography in Theatrical Releases	Danny Cohen	Nominated	
Art Directors Guild	5 February 2011	Excellence in Production Design for a Period Film	Eve Stewart	Won	
Austin Film Critics Association	22 December 2010	Best Actor	Colin Firth	Won	
British Academy of Film and Television Arts	13 February 2011	Best Film		Won	
British Academy of Film and Television Arts	13 February 2011	Outstanding British Film		Won	
British Academy of Film and Television Arts	13 February 2011	Best Direction	Tom Hooper	Nominated	
British Academy of Film and Television Arts	13 February 2011	Best Actor in a Leading Role	Colin Firth	Won	
British Academy of Film and Television Arts	13 February 2011	Best Supporting Actor	Geoffrey Rush	Won	
British Academy of Film and Television Arts	13 February 2011	Best Supporting Actress	Helena Bonham Carter	Won	
British Academy of Film and Television Arts	13 February 2011	Best Original Screenplay	David Seidler	Won	
British Academy of Film and Television Arts	13 February 2011	Best Cinematography	Danny Cohen	Nominated	
British Academy of Film and Television Arts	13 February 2011	Best Production Design	Eve Stewart, Judy Farr	Nominated	
British Academy of Film and Television Arts	13 February 2011	Best Costume Design	Jenny Beavan	Nominated	
British Academy of Film and Television Arts	13 February 2011	Best Makeup and Hair	Frances Hannon	Nominated	
British Academy of Film and Television Arts	13 February 2011	Best Film Music	Alexandre Desplat	Won	
British Academy of Film and Television Arts	13 February 2011	Best Editing	Tariq Anwar	Nominated	
British Academy of Film and Television Arts	13 February 2011	Best Sound	John Midgley, Lee Walpole, Paul Hamblin, Martin Jensen	Nominated	
British Independent Film Awards	5 December 2010	Best British Independent Film		Won	
British Independent Film Awards	5 December 2010	Best Actor	Colin Firth	Won	
British Independent Film Awards	5 December 2010	Best Director	Tom Hooper	Nominated	
British Independent Film Awards	5 December 2010	Best Screenplay	David Seidler	Won	
British Independent Film Awards	5 December 2010	Best Supporting Actor	Geoffrey Rush	Won	
British Independent Film Awards	5 December 2010	Best Supporting Actor	Guy Pearce	Nominated	
British Independent Film Awards	5 December 2010	Best Supporting Actress	Helena Bonham Carter	Won	
British Independent Film Awards	5 December 2010	The Richard Harris Award	Helena Bonham Carter	Won	
British Independent Film Awards	5 December 2010	Best Technical Achievement – Production Design	Eve Stewart	Nominated	
Chicago Film Critics Association Awards	19 December 2010	Best Film		Nominated	
Chicago Film Critics Association Awards	19 December 2010	Best Original Screenplay	David Seidler	Nominated	
Chicago Film Critics Association Awards	19 December 2010	Best Actor	Colin Firth	Won	
Chicago Film Critics Association Awards	19 December 2010	Best Supporting Actress	Helena Bonham Carter	Nominated	
Chicago Film Critics Association Awards	19 December 2010	Best Supporting Actor	Geoffrey Rush	Nominated	
Chicago Film Critics Association Awards	19 December 2010	Best Director	Tom Hooper	Nominated	
Costume Designers Guild	22 February 2011	Excellence in Period Film	Jenny Beavan	Won	
Critics' Choice Movie Award	14 January 2011	Best Film		Nominated	
Critics' Choice Movie Award	14 January 2011	Best Acting Ensemble		Nominated	
Critics' Choice Movie Award	14 January 2011	Best Supporting Actress	Helena Bonham Carter	Nominated	
Critics' Choice Movie Award	14 January 2011	Best Actor	Colin Firth	Won	
Critics' Choice Movie Award	14 January 2011	Best Supporting Actor	Geoffrey Rush	Nominated	
Critics' Choice Movie Award	14 January 2011	Best Director	Tom Hooper	Nominated	
Critics' Choice Movie Award	14 January 2011	Best Original Screenplay	David Seidler	Won	
Critics' Choice Movie Award	14 January 2011	Best Cinematography	Danny Cohen	Nominated	
Critics' Choice Movie Award	14 January 2011	Best Art Direction	Eve Stewart, Judy Farr	Nominated	
Critics' Choice Movie Award	14 January 2011	Best Costume Design	Jenny Beavan	Nominated	
Critics' Choice Movie Award	14 January 2011	Best Score	Alexandre Desplat	Nominated	
Dallas–Fort Worth Film Critics Association	17 December 2010	Best Film		Nominated	
Dallas–Fort Worth Film Critics Association	17 December 2010	Best Director	Tom Hooper	Nominated	
Dallas–Fort Worth Film Critics Association	17 December 2010	Best Supporting Actress	Helena Bonham Carter	Nominated	
Dallas–Fort Worth Film Critics Association	17 December 2010	Best Actor	Colin Firth	Nominated	
Dallas–Fort Worth Film Critics Association	17 December 2010	Best Supporting Actor	Geoffrey Rush	Nominated	
David di Donatello	6 May 2011	Best European Film		Won	
Denver Film Critics Society	28 January 2011	Best Film		Nominated	
Denver Film Critics Society	28 January 2011	Best Original Screenplay	David Seidler	Nominated	
Denver Film Critics Society	28 January 2011	Best Actor	Colin Firth	Won	
Denver Film Critics Society	28 January 2011	Best Supporting Actress	Helena Bonham Carter	Nominated	
Denver Film Critics Society	28 January 2011	Best Supporting Actor	Geoffrey Rush	Nominated	
Detroit Film Critics Society	16 December 2010	Best Film		Nominated	
Detroit Film Critics Society	16 December 2010	Best Ensemble		Nominated	
Detroit Film Critics Society	16 December 2010	Best Director	Tom Hooper	Nominated	
Detroit Film Critics Society	16 December 2010	Best Supporting Actress	Helena Bonham Carter	Nominated	
Detroit Film Critics Society	16 December 2010	Best Actor	Colin Firth	Won	
Detroit Film Critics Society	16 December 2010	Best Supporting Actor	Geoffrey Rush	Nominated	
Directors Guild of America	29 January 2011	Outstanding Directing – Feature Film	Tom Hooper	Won	
Empire Awards	27 March 2011	Best British Film		Nominated	
Empire Awards	27 March 2011	Best Film		Nominated	
Empire Awards	27 March 2011	Best Actor	Colin Firth	Won	
Empire Awards	27 March 2011	Best Actress	Helena Bonham Carter	Nominated	
Empire Awards	27 March 2011	Best Director	Tom Hooper	Nominated	
European Film Awards	3 December 2011	Best Actor	Colin Firth	Won	
European Film Awards	3 December 2011	Best Composer	Alexandre Desplat	Nominated	
European Film Awards	3 December 2011	Best Editor	Tariq Anwar	Won	
European Film Awards	3 December 2011	People's Choice Award for Best European Film		Won	
Evening Standard British Film Awards	7 February 2011	Best Film		Nominated	
Evening Standard British Film Awards	7 February 2011	Best Actor	Colin Firth	Nominated	
Evening Standard British Film Awards	7 February 2011	Technical Achievement Award – Costume Design	Jenny Beavan	Nominated	
Film Independent Spirit Awards	26 February 2011	Best Foreign Film		Won	
Florida Film Critics Circle Awards	20 December 2010	Best Actor	Colin Firth	Won	
Golden Eagle Award	27 January 2012	Best Foreign Language Film	The King's Speech	Won	
Golden Globe Awards	16 January 2011	Best Motion Picture – Drama		Nominated	
Golden Globe Awards	16 January 2011	Best Actor – Motion Picture Drama	Colin Firth	Won	
Golden Globe Awards	16 January 2011	Best Supporting Actress – Motion Picture Drama	Helena Bonham Carter	Nominated	
Golden Globe Awards	16 January 2011	Best Supporting Actor – Motion Picture Drama	Geoffrey Rush	Nominated	
Golden Globe Awards	16 January 2011	Best Director	Tom Hooper	Nominated	
Golden Globe Awards	16 January 2011	Best Screenplay	David Seidler	Nominated	
Golden Globe Awards	16 January 2011	Best Original Score	Alexandre Desplat	Nominated	
Goya Awards	13 February 2011	Best European Film	Tom Hooper	Won	
Hamptons International Film Festival	10 October 2010	Audience Award (Narrative)	Tom Hooper	Won	
Hollywood Film Festival	25 October 2010	Best Supporting Actress	Helena Bonham Carter	Won	
Houston Film Critics Society	18 December 2010	Best Picture		Nominated	
Houston Film Critics Society	18 December 2010	Best Supporting Actress	Helena Bonham Carter	Nominated	
Houston Film Critics Society	18 December 2010	Best Actor	Colin Firth	Nominated	
Houston Film Critics Society	18 December 2010	Best Supporting Actor	Geoffrey Rush	Nominated	
International Film Music Critics Association	24 February 2011	Film Score of the Year	Alexandre Desplat	Nominated	
International Film Music Critics Association	24 February 2011	Best Score for a Drama Film	Alexandre Desplat	Won	
Italian Online Movie Awards	8 May 2011	Best Picture		Nominated	
Italian Online Movie Awards	8 May 2011	Best Original Screenplay	David Seidler	Nominated	
Italian Online Movie Awards	8 May 2011	Best Film Editing	Tariq Anwar	Nominated	
Italian Online Movie Awards	8 May 2011	Best Score	Alexandre Desplat	Nominated	
Italian Online Movie Awards	8 May 2011	Best Director	Tom Hooper	Nominated	
Italian Online Movie Awards	8 May 2011	Best Actor	Colin Firth	Won	
Italian Online Movie Awards	8 May 2011	Best Supporting Actor	Geoffrey Rush	Nominated	
Italian Online Movie Awards	8 May 2011	Best Supporting Actress	Helena Bonham Carter	Won	
Leeds International Film Festival	22 November 2010	Audience Award for Feature Film		Won	
London Film Critics' Circle Awards	10 February 2011	Film of the Year		Nominated	
London Film Critics' Circle Awards	10 February 2011	British Film of the Year		Won	
London Film Critics' Circle Awards	10 February 2011	Actor of the Year	Colin Firth	Won	
London Film Critics' Circle Awards	10 February 2011	British Actor of the Year	Colin Firth	Nominated	
London Film Critics' Circle Awards	10 February 2011	British Actress of the Year	Helena Bonham Carter	Nominated	
London Film Critics' Circle Awards	10 February 2011	British Director of the Year	Tom Hooper	Won	
London Film Critics' Circle Awards	10 February 2011	Screenwriter of the Year	David Seidler	Nominated	
Los Angeles Film Critics Association	12 December 2010	Best Actor	Colin Firth	Won	
Motion Picture Sound Editors	20 February 2011	Best Sound Editing: Dialogue and ADR in a Feature Film	Tariq Anwar	Nominated	
National Board of Review	2 December 2010	Top Ten Films		Nominated	
National Movie Awards	11 May 2011	Best Drama		Won	
National Movie Awards	11 May 2011	Special Recognition		Won	
National Movie Awards	11 May 2011	Performance of the Year	Colin Firth	Won	
National Movie Awards	11 May 2011	Performance of the Year	Helena Bonham Carter	Nominated	
National Movie Awards	11 May 2011	Performance of the Year	Geoffrey Rush	Nominated	
National Society of Film Critics Awards	8 January 2011	Best Supporting Actor	Geoffrey Rush	Won	
National Society of Film Critics Awards	8 January 2011	Best Actor	Colin Firth	Nominated	
National Society of Film Critics Awards	8 January 2011	Best Screenplay	David Seidler	Nominated	
New York Film Critics Circle Awards	13 December 2010	Best Actor	Colin Firth	Won	
Online Film Critics Society Award	3 January 2011	Best Actor	Colin Firth	Won	
Online Film Critics Society Award	3 January 2011	Best Supporting Actor	Geoffrey Rush	Nominated	
Online Film Critics Society Award	3 January 2011	Best Original Screenplay	David Seidler	Nominated	
Producers Guild of America	22 January 2011	Best Theatrical Motion Picture	Iain Canning, Emile Sherman, Gareth Unwin	Won	
San Diego Film Critics Society Awards	14 December 2010	Best Film		Nominated	
San Diego Film Critics Society Awards	14 December 2010	Best Actor	Colin Firth	Nominated	
San Diego Film Critics Society Awards	14 December 2010	Best Original Screenplay	David Seidler	Nominated	
San Diego Film Critics Society Awards	14 December 2010	Best Supporting Actor	Geoffrey Rush	Nominated	
San Francisco Film Critics Circle Awards	13 December 2010	Best Original Screenplay	David Seidler	Won	
San Francisco Film Critics Circle Awards	13 December 2010	Best Actor	Colin Firth	Won	
Santa Barbara International Film Festival	24 January 2011	Best Ensemble Award		Won	
Satellite Awards	19 December 2010	Best Film – Drama		Nominated	
Satellite Awards	19 December 2010	Best Original Screenplay	David Seidler	Won	
Satellite Awards	19 December 2010	Best Director	Tom Hooper	Nominated	
Satellite Awards	19 December 2010	Best Actor – Motion Picture Drama	Colin Firth	Won	
Satellite Awards	19 December 2010	Best Supporting Actor – Motion Picture	Geoffrey Rush	Nominated	
Screen Actors Guild Awards	30 January 2011	Outstanding Performance by a Male Actor in a Leading Role	Colin Firth	Won	
Screen Actors Guild Awards	30 January 2011	Outstanding Performance by a Female Actor in a Supporting Role	Helena Bonham Carter	Nominated	
Screen Actors Guild Awards	30 January 2011	Outstanding Performance by a Male Actor in a Supporting Role	Geoffrey Rush	Nominated	
Screen Actors Guild Awards	30 January 2011	Outstanding Performance by a Cast in a Motion Picture	Anthony Andrews, Helena Bonham Carter, Jennifer Ehle, Colin Firth, Michael Gambon, Derek Jacobi, Guy Pearce, Geoffrey Rush, Timothy Spall	Won	
St. Louis Film Critics Association	20 December 2010	Best Actor	Colin Firth	Won	
St. Louis Film Critics Association	20 December 2010	Best Supporting Actor	Geoffrey Rush	Nominated	
St. Louis Film Critics Association	20 December 2010	Best Supporting Actress	Helena Bonham Carter	Nominated	
St. Louis Film Critics Association	20 December 2010	Best Director	Tom Hooper	Nominated	
St. Louis Film Critics Association	20 December 2010	Best Original Screenplay	David Seidler	Won	
St. Louis Film Critics Association	20 December 2010	Best Film		Nominated	
St. Louis Film Critics Association	20 December 2010	Best Artistic/Creative Film		Nominated	
Toronto Film Critics Association Awards	14 December 2010	Best Actor	Colin Firth	Nominated	
Toronto Film Critics Association Awards	14 December 2010	Best Supporting Actor	Geoffrey Rush	Nominated	
Toronto Film Critics Association Awards	14 December 2010	Best Screenplay	David Seidler	Nominated	
Toronto International Film Festival	19 September 2010	People's Choice Award	Tom Hooper	Won	
Vancouver Film Critics Circle	10 January 2011	Best Actor	Colin Firth	Won	
Vancouver Film Critics Circle	10 January 2011	Best Supporting Actor	Geoffrey Rush	Nominated	
Washington D.C. Area Film Critics Association	6 December 2010	Best Supporting Actress	Helena Bonham Carter	Nominated	
Washington D.C. Area Film Critics Association	6 December 2010	Best Supporting Actor	Geoffrey Rush	Nominated	
Washington D.C. Area Film Critics Association	6 December 2010	Best Actor	Colin Firth	Won	
Washington D.C. Area Film Critics Association	6 December 2010	Best Original Screenplay	David Seidler	Nominated	
Women Film Critics Circle Awards	20 December 2010	Best Actor	Colin Firth	Won	
Women Film Critics Circle Awards	20 December 2010	Best Male Images in a Movie		Won	

== See also ==
- 2010 in film
