= Royal address =

A royal address is a public speech by a monarch or member of a royal family. This may refer to:

- A speech from the throne as is customary in many nations, including during
  - the State Opening of Parliament in the United Kingdom
  - the Opening of the Canadian parliament
  - the Imperial Investiture in Japan
  - Prinsjesdag in the Netherlands
- A Christmas message by the reigning monarch, including
  - the Royal Christmas message in the UK
  - the Christmas Eve National Speech in Spain
  - similar messages elsewhere
- A royal address to the nation, an address to the United Kingdom and the Commonwealth, an extraordinary broadcast during times of national importance by the British monarch
- Commonwealth Day, formerly Empire Day, where the Head of the Commonwealth makes an address to the Commonwealth of Nations.

== See also ==
- State of the Nation (disambiguation)
- King's speech (disambiguation)
