= The King's Speech (play) =

2012 play written by David Seidler

- Original language: English
- Written by: David Seidler
- Subject: Biographical
- Genre: Drama

Premiere
- Date: 2012
- Place: Yvonne Arnaud Theatre
- http://thekingsspeechonbroadway.com/site/

The King's Speech is a 2012 play written by David Seidler and based on the 2010 Academy Award-winning film of the same name. The play was staged at the Wyndham's Theatre on London's West End and opened on 27 March 2012 and closed on 12 May 2012.

== Production history ==
The story of how King George VI overcame his fear of public speaking through the help of Australian speech therapist Lionel Logue was first researched by David Seidler in the 1970s. He had originally conceived the piece as a stage play, and contacted Valentine Logue, Lionel's son, and was able to gather information about the story. Valentine Logue asked Seidler to contact the Queen Mother and ask her for approval of the story being publicized. She responded she did not want the story told until after she died. The Queen Mother died in 2002, and it wasn't until 2005 that Seidler began working on the story again. It was instead conceived as film. The film version of The King's Speech, that starred Colin Firth as King George and Geoffrey Rush as Lionel Logue, was a critical success and won several Oscars including Best Original Screenplay for Seidler. The success of the film encouraged producers to bring the story to the stage as originally intended.

The play made its World Premiere in February 2012 at the Yvonne Arnaud Theatre. It then went on a short tour in the UK and then premiered at the Wyndham's Theatre on the West End.

In 2015, the play was staged at the Birmingham Repertory Theatre. In 2016, the play was staged in Germany at the Neuss RLT Theatre.

The play was revived in 2026 at the Barn Theatre, Cirencester, with a subsequent UK tour.

== Principal roles and original cast ==
Character	Original West End performer
King George VI	Charles Edwards
Lionel Logue	Jonathan Hyde
Queen Elizabeth	Emma Fielding
Myrtle Logue	Charlotte Randle
Winston Churchill	Ian McNeice
Wallis Simpson	Lisa Baird
