= Bertie and Elizabeth =

2002 British TV drama biopic

- US DVD cover
- Written by: Nigel Williams
- Directed by: Giles Foster
- Starring: James Wilby; Juliet Aubrey; Alan Bates; Eileen Atkins; David Ryall; Charles Edwards; Paul Brooke; Oliver Ford Davies
- Country of origin: United Kingdom
- Original language: English

Production
- Executive producers: Rebecca Eaton; Jonathan Powell; Michael Whitehall
- Producer: Jo Willett
- Cinematography: Rex Maidment
- Editor: Catherine Creed
- Running time: 98 minutes
- Production companies: Carlton Television; WGBH; Whitehall Films

Original release
- Network: ITV
- Release: 4 June 2002

Bertie and Elizabeth is a 2002 television film directed by Giles Foster and produced by Carlton Television. The film explores the relationship between King George VI and his wife Queen Elizabeth from their first meeting to the King's death in the winter of 1952. Bertie and Elizabeth was commissioned especially for the Golden Jubilee of Elizabeth II and was first broadcast on ITV1 on 4 June 2002, only two months after the death and funeral of Queen Elizabeth the Queen Mother. The role of Queen Mary was portrayed by Dame Eileen Atkins, a role she again played in season one of The Crown in 2016.

== Plot ==
The film begins with the initial meeting between the then Duke of York and Lady Elizabeth Bowes-Lyon. The television drama then moves on through their courtship, marriage, and succession to the throne after the abdication of Edward VIII. We also see the two royals dealing with the events of the Second World War, as Buckingham Palace is hit and partially destroyed by a Luftwaffe bomb.

The film portrays Bertie's struggle to overcome his stammer, the fear he felt towards his father and the punishing stress the Duke was placed under during the abdication crisis of 1936.

== Cast ==
- James Wilby as Bertie, later King George VI
- Juliet Aubrey as Elizabeth, later Queen Elizabeth
- Alan Bates as King George V
- Eileen Atkins as Queen Mary
- David Ryall as Winston Churchill
- Charles Edwards as David, later King Edward VIII, then Duke of Windsor
- Paul Brooke as Tommy Lascelles
- Oliver Ford Davies as Archbishop Lang
- Corin Redgrave as General Montgomery
- Robert Hardy as President Roosevelt
- Michael Elwyn as Lionel Logue
- Amber Rose Sealey as Wallis Simpson
- Barbara Leigh-Hunt as Lady Mabell Airlie
- David Burke as Lord John Reith
- Helen Ryan as Queen Wilhelmina
- Elisabeth Dermot Walsh as Princess Elizabeth known as "Lillibet", the future Queen Elizabeth II
- Denis Lill as Clement Attlee
- Deborah Cornelius as Thelma Furness
- Dolly Wells as Princess Mary
- Terence Harvey as Sir Clement Price Thomas
- Jeremy Child as Sir Samuel Hoare
- Anthony Smee as Ernest Simpson
- Geoffrey Beevers as Claude Bowes-Lyon, 14th Earl of Strathmore and Kinghorne
- Osmund Bullock as Radio Newscaster

== See also ==
- The King's Speech, a film about George VI's stammer and his efforts to reduce its effect.
- The Crown (TV series), Eileen Atkins reprised her role as Queen Mary in season 1, while Charles Edwards took a role of Queen Elizabeth II's private secretary Sir Martin Charteris in seasons 3 and 4.
