= The King's Speech: How One Man Saved the British Monarchy =

Book by Peter Conradi and Mark Logue

- Author: Peter Conradi, Mark Logue
- Language: English
- Publication date: 2010

The King's Speech: How One Man Saved the British Monarchy (2010) is a non-fiction, biographical book written by Peter Conradi and Mark Logue. Logue's grandfather, Lionel Logue, was a speech and language therapist who helped Prince Albert, Duke of York, (later George VI) manage his difficulties in public speaking with a severe stutter.

== Adaptations ==
- The 2010 historical drama film The King's Speech is based on Lionel Logue's experience with Prince Albert.
  - The 2012 play The King's Speech, written by David Seidler, is based on the film.
