= Charles Edwards (actor) =

English actor (born 1969)

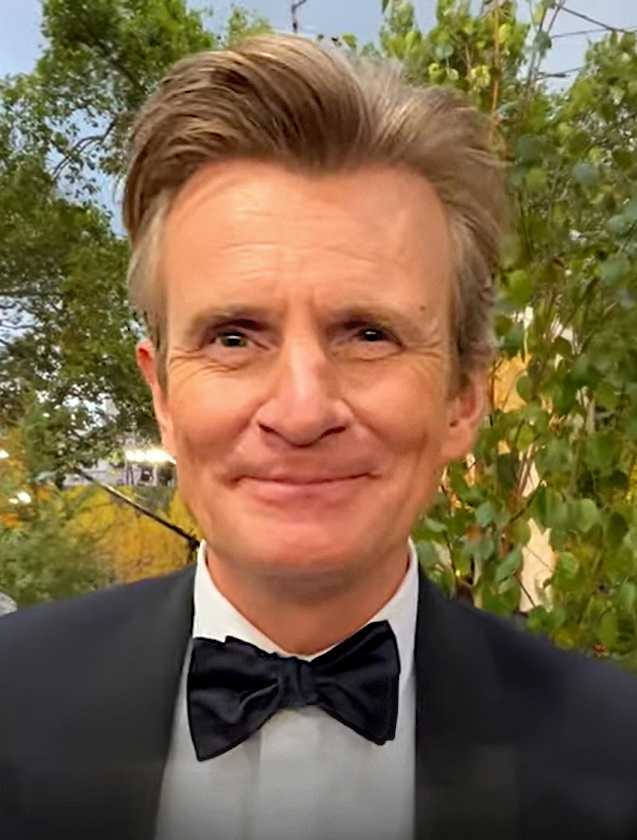
- Edwards in 2022
- Born: Charles Peter Keep Edwards; 1 October 1969 (age 57); Haslemere, Surrey, England, UK
- Education: Winchester College; Guildhall School of Music and Drama
- Occupation: Actor
- Years active: 1993–present
- Known for: The Rings of Power; The Crown; Downton Abbey; Holy Flying Circus; The Halcyon; Henry IX

Charles Peter Keep Edwards (born 1 October 1969) is an English actor with a career in theatre, TV, and film. His roles include Michael Gregson in Downton Abbey (2012–2013), Alexander McDonald in The Terror (2018), Sir Martin Charteris in The Crown (2019–2020), and Celebrimbor in The Lord of the Rings: The Rings of Power (2022–2024).

== Early life ==
Edwards was born 1 October 1969, in the town of Haslemere in Surrey, England, and grew up in Grayshott, Hampshire.

He is the youngest of four sons of stockbroker Ronald Derek Keep Edwards (1934–2024), and his first wife, Sally Anne Lake, daughter of rubber company executive Patrick Boyle Lake Coghlan, sometime chairman of Anglo-Asian Rubber Plantations Ltd.

== Education ==
From an early age, Edwards attended Amesbury School in Hindhead, Surrey. Edwards was further educated at Winchester College, Hampshire, from 1983 to 1987, where he boarded in Moberly's house. His father also attended the College from 1948 to 1953, as did his older brother, Simon, who attended from 1974 to 1978. Both father and sons boarded at the same House.

Edwards went on to pursue acting at the Guildhall School of Music and Drama, from which he graduated in 1992.

== Career ==
=== Theatre ===
Edwards' debut in acting was on stage as a gingerbread man in a play of Hansel and Gretel. Edwards' first professional theatre engagement was in Blithe Spirit at age 24. Since then he has appeared in many shows such as The Duchess of Malfi, Hay Fever, Private Lives and The Apple Cart.

Edwards received acclaim for his Broadway debut performance as Richard Hannay in the 2005 play of The 39 Steps, in the first London production in 2006, and in the first US productions in 2007 (Boston) and in New York City in 2008. He is the only actor from the London production to transfer to the US productions. Edwards concluded his run in the play on 6 July 2008.

He has made appearances in a number of Shakespeare plays, including Peter Hall's production of Twelfth Night at the Royal National Theatre (Cottesloe auditorium) as Sir Andrew Aguecheek; as Benedick in Much Ado About Nothing at Shakespeare's Globe; The Merchant of Venice; and A Midsummer Night's Dream, playing Oberon to Judi Dench's Titania. For his performance in Much Ado About Nothing, Edwards was shortlisted for Best Actor at the 2011 Evening Standard Theatre Awards. He also received a WhatsOnStage Award nomination, in 2012, for his performance in Twelfth Night.

In 2012, Edwards played the lead role of George VI in the original stage play of The King's Speech on a nationwide tour and also the West End, gaining positive feedback from critics across the board. Drama critic Michael Billington wrote of his performance, "Edwards, who has been edging towards stardom for several seasons, has now unequivocally arrived." Later in 2012, he took on the role of Conservative Whip Jack Weatherill in James Graham's This House at the National Theatre. Towards the end of the year, he was shortlisted again for Best Actor at the Evening Standard Theatre Awards for his performance in both plays.

In 2013, Edwards starred as Charles Marsden in a Simon Godwin adaptation of Eugene O'Neill's Pulitzer prize winning play Strange Interlude at the National's Lyttleton Theatre. In 2014, Edwards co-starred in Michael Blakemore's adaptation of Blithe Spirit, opposite Dame Angela Lansbury. He played the title role in Simon Godwin's production of Richard II at Shakespeare's Globe, and Henry Trebell in Harley Granville Barker's play Waste at the National Theatre, both in 2015.

In March 2017, he starred as Henry Higgins in the Brisbane and Melbourne seasons of Lerner and Loewe's My Fair Lady, presented by Opera Australia and John Frost and directed by Dame Julie Andrews.

Edwards worked with playwright James Graham again in 2021, playing Gore Vidal in Best of Enemies at the Young Vic. He received a Laurence Olivier Award nomination for Best Actor the following year.

=== TV and film ===
In 2002, he played David, also known as King Edward VIII, in the feature-length TV drama Bertie and Elizabeth for ITV.

In 2011, he played Michael Palin in Holy Flying Circus, a dramatisation of the controversy surrounding Monty Python's Life of Brian. In October 2012, Edwards appeared in the third season of the television series Downton Abbey as Michael Gregson. Edwards appeared in the 2013 film Diana, charting the final few years of Diana, Princess of Wales, where he played Diana's private secretary Patrick Jephson. He made an appearance in BBC series Sherlock as David Welsborough, on the first episode of the fourth series which aired 1 January 2017 titled "The Six Thatchers". Also in 2017, he took on the lead role of the fictional King Henry IX in the TV series Henry IX for Sky channel GOLD.

Edwards' other film and television credits include Batman Begins, An Ideal Husband, Monarch of the Glen, The Halcyon, Mansfield Park, Murder Rooms: The Dark Beginnings of Sherlock Holmes, The Shell Seekers, Colditz and Midsomer Murders.

In 2019 and 2020, he appeared in the third and fourth seasons of the widely acclaimed Netflix series The Crown as Martin Charteris, Queen Elizabeth II's private secretary, taking over the role from Harry Hadden-Paton, who played a younger Charteris in the first two seasons. In 2021, Edwards worked on a New Zealand TV mini series Under the Vines, released on 19 January 2022.

In 2022, Edwards played the key role of Celebrimbor, the elven smith responsible for forging the Rings of Power in The Lord of the Rings: The Rings of Power. Edwards was named an honorable mention for TVLine's "Performer of the Week" for the week of 23 September 2024 for his performance.

== Filmography ==
Year	Title	Role	Notes
1999	An Ideal Husband	Jack	
1999	Mansfield Park	Yates	
2000	Relative Values	Phillip Bateman-Tobias	
2001	Murder Rooms	Sir Arthur Conan Doyle	
2002	Bertie and Elizabeth	David	
2002	Monarch of the Glen	David Fraser	
2005	Colditz	Ellways, MI9 Officer	
2005	Batman Begins	Wayne Enterprises Executive	
2007	The All Together	Marcus Craigie-Halkett	
2008	Midsomer Murders	Edward “Ned” Fitzroy	
2011	Holy Flying Circus	Michael Palin	
2012–2013	Downton Abbey	Michael Gregson	
2013	National Theatre Live: This House	Jack Weatherill	
2013	Philomena	David	
2013	Diana	Patrick Jephson	
2015	Arthur & George	Alfred Wood	
2017	Sherlock	David Welsborough	
2017	The Halcyon	Lucian D'Abberville	
2017	Henry IX	King Henry IX	
2018	The Terror	Dr. Alexander McDonald	
2019–2020	The Crown	Sir Martin Charteris	
2020	The Witches	Mr. Jenkins	
2020	The Duke	Joseph Simpson	
2021	The Girlfriend Experience	Elliott Stanton	
2021–2024	Under the Vines	Louis Oakley	
2022–2024	The Lord of the Rings: The Rings of Power	Lord Celebrimbor	
2026	The Gentlemen	Simon McDougall	

== Awards and nominations ==
Year	Award	Category	Work	Result	Ref
2011	2011 Evening Standard Theatre Awards	Best Actor	Much Ado About Nothing (Shakespeare's Globe)	Nominated	
2012	2012 Evening Standard Theatre Awards	Best Actor	The King's Speech (Shakespeare's Globe) and This House (Royal National Theatre, Cottesloe)	Nominated	
2012	WhatsOnStage Awards	Best Supporting Actor in a Play	Twelfth Night (Royal National Theatre, Cottesloe)	Nominated	
2014	Clarence Derwent Awards	Best Supporting Male (UK)	Strange Interlude (Royal National Theatre, Lyttelton)	Won	
2018	Green Room Awards	Best Male Actor in a Leading Role (Musical Theatre)	My Fair Lady (Opera Australia)	Won	
2020	27th Screen Actors Guild Awards	SAG Award for Outstanding Performance by an Ensemble in a Drama Series (shared)	The Crown	Won	
2021	28th Screen Actors Guild Awards	SAG Award for Outstanding Performance by an Ensemble in a Drama Series (shared)	The Crown	Won	
2022	2022 Laurence Olivier Awards	Best Actor	Best of Enemies (Young Vic)	Nominated	
