= Henry IX (TV series) =

Television series

- Genre: Comedy
- Created by: Dick Clement; Ian La Frenais
- Directed by: Vadim Jean
- Starring: Charles Edwards
- Country of origin: United Kingdom
- Original language: English
- No. of seasons: 1
- No. of episodes: 3

Production
- Producer: Pete Thornton

Original release
- Network: Gold
- Release: 5 April – 19 April 2017

Henry IX is a 2017 British comedy series created by Dick Clement and Ian La Frenais, that aired on the television channel Gold.

== Synopsis ==
Henry IX (Charles Edwards), King of the United Kingdom and Head of the Commonwealth, is having a mid-life crisis, unhappy with his life and wanting to do more.

== Cast ==
- Charles Edwards as Henry IX, King of the United Kingdom and Commonwealth.
- Sally Phillips as Queen Katerina, Henry's wife.
- Annette Crosbie as Queen Mother Charlotte
- Pippa Haywood as Prime Minister Gwen Oxlade.
- Kara Tointon as Serena, the Palace florist.
- Gina Bellman as Lady Leonora, Queen Katarina's lady-in-waiting.

Other cast members include Colin Salmon, Don Warrington and Robert Portal.
