= Peter Conradi =

British author and journalist

Peter Conradi is a British author and journalist who is the Europe Editor of The Sunday Times of London.

== Biography ==
Conradi is the author of The Red Ripper: Inside the Mind of Russia's Most Brutal Serial Killer (about Andrei Chikatilo); Mad Vlad: Vladimir Zhirinovsky and the New Russian Nationalism (about Vladimir Zhirinovsky) and Hitler's Piano Player (about Ernst Hanfstaengl a.k.a. Putzi). The Independent called Hitler's Piano Player "an exemplary piece of biographical writing".

He is co-author with Mark Logue of the best-selling book The King's Speech: How One Man Saved the British Monarchy, which tells the story of the friendship between King George VI and his Australian speech therapist, Lionel Logue, that inspired the highly acclaimed film of the same name. He is also author of Royale Europe, a book about Europe's reigning royal families, which was published initially in French in May 2011.

A graduate of the University of Oxford (Brasenose College), Conradi also studied at LMU Munich. He was a foreign correspondent based in Brussels, Zurich, and Moscow, and became deputy foreign editor of The Sunday Times of London in 1998. He was appointed editor of Home, the newspaper's property supplement, in April 2006 and subsequently Focus editor. He was appointed as the newspaper's foreign editor, succeeding Sean Ryan, in July 2013. In September 2018 he was named European editor for The Sunday Times and Times.

His book about politics between Russia and the United States, Who Lost Russia?, was described by Owen Matthews in the Literary Review as 'fast-paced, comprehensive, solidly researched and, most importantly, essential reading for anyone who wants to understand one of the great crises of our times.'

He has three children and lives in Paris.
