= Bedlam Productions =

- Formerly: GSPB Ltd
- Industry: Film and television production
- Founded: 2006; 20 years ago
- Founder: Simon Egan; Gareth Ellis-Unwin
- Headquarters: London, England
- Website: bedlamfilmproductions.com

Bedlam Productions Limited (formerly GSPB Ltd from 2012 to 2013) is a British film and television production company based in London. The company was founded in 2006 by Simon Egan and Gareth Ellis-Unwin, who both studied at Ravensbourne University.

== Company organisation ==
Bedlam Productions Limited is registered in London, with its registered office at Windsor House on Great Castle Street. Simon Breen joined the production company as creative director in January 2011. In February 2018, Bedlam co-founder Gareth Ellis-Unwin was appointed head of film at ScreenSkills, while remaining involved with Bedlam productions as a non-executive director. In 2023, Ellis-Unwin announced his departure from ScreenSkills to return to full-time film producing through Bedlam Productions.

In August 2026, co-founder Simon Egan stepped down as a director of Bedlam Productions Limited, with Olwyn Silvester appointed to the board alongside Gareth Ellis-Unwin.

== Film and television productions ==
Bedlam co-produced the BAFTA-nominated thriller Exam (2009), written and directed by Stuart Hazeldine, with company co-founder Gareth Ellis-Unwin serving as a producer. Hazeldine received a BAFTA nomination for Outstanding Debut by a British Writer, Director or Producer.

Bedlam's first major feature production was the award-winning The King's Speech (2010), starring Colin Firth, Geoffrey Rush and Helena Bonham Carter. The critically acclaimed film grossed over $400m at the global box office. It also won four Oscars, including Best Picture and Best Actor for Colin Firth at the 83rd Academy Awards, as well as seven BAFTA Awards, including Best Film and Outstanding British Film. Ellis-Unwin's work on The King's Speech made him a co-recipient of the Producers Guild of America's Darryl F. Zanuck Award for Outstanding Producer of Theatrical Motion Pictures in 2011. In total, The King's Speech won at least 70 awards worldwide. The King's Speech was followed by the Bedlam-produced documentary The King's Speech: Revealed, which aired on Channel 5 on 3 May 2011.

Bedlam Productions presented a masterclass at Sheffield DocFest in June 2011, discussing the success of The King's Speech and its documentary projects. The company also co-produced Zaytoun (2012), directed by Eran Riklis.

Its subsequent productions included How We Used to Live (2013), a documentary directed by Paul Kelly and narrated by Ian McShane, with company co-founder Simon Egan serving as executive producer. The following year, Bedlam co-founder Gareth Ellis-Unwin served as executive producer on Kajaki, a British war film directed by Paul Katis. Bedlam later co-produced Steel Country (2018), a crime thriller directed by Simon Fellows and starring Andrew Scott, with Gareth Ellis-Unwin serving as one of its producers. The company also worked on Hamble, a proof-of-concept film produced using virtual production technology at Warner Bros. Studios, Leavesden, with Ellis-Unwin serving as one of its producers.
