= Valentine Logue =

British neurosurgeon (1913–2000)

Valentine Logue FRCS FRCP
- Born: Valentine Darte Logue; 1 November 1913; Perth, Australia
- Died: 28 December 2000 (aged 87)
- Education: King's College London
- Occupation: Neurosurgeon
- Spouse: Anne Bolton (m. 1944)
- Children: 2
- Father: Lionel Logue

Valentine Darte Logue (1 November 1913 – 28 December 2000) was an Australian-born British neurosurgeon.

== Early life ==
Logue was born on 1 November 1913 in Perth, Western Australia. He was the second of three sons born to Myrtle (née Gruenert) and Lionel Logue. The family moved to London in 1924, where his father was a pioneering speech therapist known for his work with King George VI.

== Career ==
Logue graduated MBBS at King's College London in 1936. He commenced his surgical training at St George's Hospital, qualifying MRCP and FRCS in 1938. He initially trained as a general surgeon and in 1940 was appointed as a consultant at St George's, treating victims of The Blitz.

Logue developed an interest in neurosurgery in 1941 after meeting Wylie McKissock, who encouraged him to specialise. He trained under McKissock for two and a half years.

In 1965, Logue established a department of neurosurgical studies at the National Hospital for Nervous Diseases, within University College London (UCL). He was appointed professor in 1968 and in 1974 was appointed chair of neurosurgery following an endowment through the Institute of Neurology, the first professional chair for neurosurgery in England.

Logue is described in Plarr's Lives of the Fellows as "one of the most distinguished neurosurgeons of his generation". He was president of the Society of British Neurological Surgeons in 1974 and assisted in the creation of the European Association of Neurosurgical Societies. In 1993 he was awarded a medal of honour by the World Federation of Neurosurgical Societies.

== Personal life ==
In 1944, Logue married Anne Bolton, who became a consultant in child psychiatry at the Middlesex Hospital. The couple had two daughters.

In the 1980s, Logue was approached by screenwriter David Seidler for access to his father's papers, which later formed the basis for Seidler's screenplay that was adapted into The King's Speech.
