= Gareth Unwin =

British film producer (born 1972)

Gareth Ellis-Unwin
- Born: Gareth Unwin; February 20, 1972 (age 54); Germany
- Occupation: Film producer

Gareth Ellis-Unwin (né Unwin, 20 February 1972) is a British film producer best known for producing the 2010 film The King's Speech, for which he won an Academy Award for Best Picture. He is also the co-founder and CEO of Bedlam Productions.

== Life and career ==
Growing up in Slough, Berkshire, Unwin attended Herschel Grammar School. He worked part-time at Pinewood Studios. After graduating from Ravensbourne College, Gareth rose quickly through the ranks to be assistant director and production manager for a number of drama and documentary projects. His first feature film as producer, Exam (2009), earned a nomination at the 63rd British Academy Film Awards. Following that, Gareth produced The King's Speech alongside Iain Canning and Emile Sherman, picking up the Audience Award at Toronto International Film Festival, a Producers Guild of America award, seven BAFTAs, including both Outstanding British Film and Best Film, and four Academy Awards, including Best Film.

Unwin also produced Zaytoun with Far Films, directed by Eran Riklis, which was a runner-up for the Audience Award at the 2012 Toronto International Film Festival, and will next be producing The Lady Who Went Too Far, which sees him re-unite with King's Speech writer David Seidler for a tale of female heroism in the early 19th century.
