= Lionel Logue =

Australian speech and language therapist (1880–1953)

Lionel Logue CVO
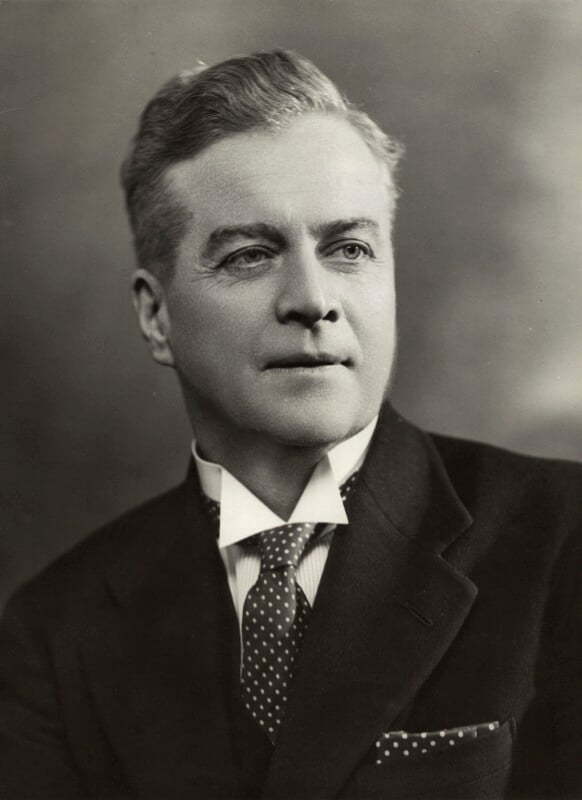
- Logue in 1937
- Born: 26 February 1880; College Town, Adelaide, South Australia
- Died: 12 April 1953 (aged 73); London, England
- Known for: Speech therapist to King George VI
- Spouse: Myrtle Gruenert (m. 1907; died 1945)
- Children: 3, incl. Valentine Logue
- Scientific career
- Fields: Speech and elocution
- Workplaces: British Society of Speech Therapists; Royal College of Speech Therapists

Lionel George Logue CVO (26 February 1880 – 12 April 1953) was an Australian speech and language therapist and amateur stage actor who helped King George VI manage his stammer.

== Early life and family ==
Logue was born on 26 February 1880 in College Town, South Australia. He was the oldest of four children born to Lavinia (née Rankin) and George Edward Logue. His father was an accountant at his grandfather's brewery who later managed the Burnside Hotel and the Elephant and Castle Hotel. His grandfather Edward Logue, originally from Dublin, was the founder of Logue's Brewery, a predecessor of the South Australian Brewing Company. His uncle by marriage was barrister and social activist Paris Nesbit.

Logue attended Prince Alfred College between 1889 and 1896. Unable to decide what to study, Logue came across Henry Wadsworth Longfellow's The Song of Hiawatha:

Then Iagoo, the great boaster,
He the marvellous story-teller,
He the traveller and the talker,
He the friend of old Nokomis,
Made a bow for Hiawatha;

The poem's rhythm inspired Logue to put his interest in voices to good use. After leaving school at sixteen, he received elocution training from Edward Reeves. Reeves had moved to Adelaide in 1878 and taught elocution to his pupils by day and gave popular recitals to audiences in Victoria Hall by night. Logue worked for Reeves as a secretary and assistant teacher from 1902, while studying music at the University of Adelaide's Elder Conservatorium. While working for Reeves, Logue began to give recitals of his own for which he was praised for his "clear, powerful voice."

After his father died on 17 November 1902, Logue set up his own practice as a teacher of elocution. By 1904, he had gained a good reputation and was receiving praise from the local newspapers. However, he decided to take a contract with an engineering firm some 2,000 kilometres (1,200 mi) westward in Kalgoorlie, Western Australia, installing an electricity supply at a gold mine.

== Professional career ==
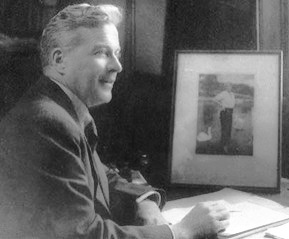
Logue c. 1930

His professional career began in Perth, where, in addition to teaching elocution, acting, and public speaking, he put on plays and recitations, and also founded a club for public speakers. He was also involved with YMCA Perth and schools such as Methodist Ladies' College, Loreto Convent, Scotch College, Perth Technical School, and Claremont Teachers College.

In 1911, Logue and his wife set out on a tour of the world to study methods of public speaking. Later he developed treatments for Australian First World War war veterans who had shell shock-induced impaired speech. In addition to physical exercises, which helped with patients' breathing, Logue's distinctive therapy emphasised humour, patience, and "superhuman sympathy".

In 1924, Logue took his wife and three sons to England, ostensibly for a holiday. Once there, he took jobs teaching elocution at schools around London, and in 1926 he opened a speech-defect practice at 146 Harley Street. Logue used fees paid by wealthy clients to subsidise patients unable to pay. It was here that the Duke of York – the future King George VI – sought Logue's help. Logue became a founding fellow of the Royal College of Speech and Language Therapists in 1944.

=== Treatment of George VI ===
As a speech therapist, Logue was self-taught and was initially dismissed by the medical establishment as a quack, but he worked with the Duke from the late 1920s into the mid-1940s.

Before ascending the throne as George VI, the Duke of York dreaded public speaking because of a severe stammer; his closing speech at the British Empire Exhibition at Wembley on 31 October 1925 proved an ordeal for speaker and listeners alike. The Duke resolved to find some way to manage his stammer, and engaged Logue in 1926 after being introduced to him by Lord Stamfordham.

Diagnosing poor co-ordination between the Duke's larynx and thoracic diaphragm, Logue prescribed a daily hour of vocal exercises. Logue's treatment gave the Duke the confidence to relax and avoid tension-induced muscle spasms. As a result, he only occasionally stammered. By 1927, he was speaking confidently and managed his address at the opening of Parliament House in Canberra without stammering.

Logue was often called over the years when the King was expected to make a speech, and he was regularly invited to the royal family's Christmas dinner party to assist with the Christmas message. Their relationship was featured in a film, a play and a book.

== Honours ==
In May 1937, Logue was appointed a Member of the Royal Victorian Order, 4th class, (MVO) on the occasion of George VI's coronation. In June 1944, he was promoted to Commander in the Royal Victorian Order (CVO).

King George VI died on 6 February 1952. On 26 February 1952, Logue wrote to the late king's wife, Queen Elizabeth The Queen Mother:

No man ever worked as hard as he did, and achieved such a grand result. During all those years you were a tower of strength to him and he has often told me how much he has owed to you, and the excellent result could never have been achieved if it had not been for your help. I have never forgotten your gracious help to me after my own beloved girl passed on.

The Queen Mother replied: "I think that I know perhaps better than anyone just how much you helped the King, not only with his speech, but through that his whole life and outlook on life. I shall always be deeply grateful to you for all you did for him."

== Personal life ==
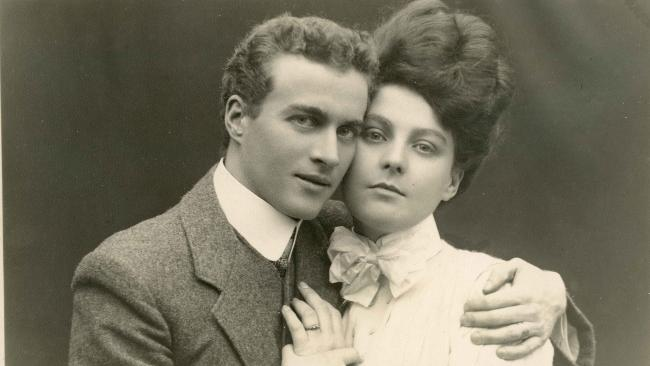
Logue with Myrtle Gruenert at the time of their engagement in Perth in 1906

Logue married Myrtle Gruenert, a 21-year-old clerk, at St George's Anglican Cathedral, Perth, on 20 March 1907. They had three sons, Valentine, Laurie, and Anthony. Valentine trained at King's College London and St George's Hospital and became a neurosurgeon.

Lionel Logue was a Freemason, initiated, passed, and raised in 1908, and became Worshipful Master in 1919; he was a member of St. George's Lodge (now J.D. Stevenson St. George's Lodge No.6, Western Australian Constitution).

He lived in a 25-room Victorian villa called Beechgrove in Sydenham from 1932 until 1947, now demolished and part of Sydenham Hill Wood.

Myrtle died suddenly from a heart attack in June 1945, and Logue died in London, on 12 April 1953. His funeral was held on 17 April in Holy Trinity Brompton before his body was cremated. Representatives of Queen Elizabeth II and Queen Elizabeth The Queen Mother attended the funeral, not personally attending due to the mourning for Queen Mary, who had died two weeks prior.

== In popular culture ==
With Peter Conradi, Logue's grandson Mark wrote a book, The King's Speech: How One Man Saved the British Monarchy, about his grandfather's relationship with the King. In the 2010 British film The King's Speech, written by David Seidler, Logue was played by Geoffrey Rush, his wife by Jennifer Ehle, and his patient by Colin Firth. In the West End stage adaptation of The King's Speech at Wyndham's Theatre, Australian actor Jonathan Hyde played Lionel Logue, and in the US stage premiere, Logue was played by James Frain.

Welsh actor Michael Elwyn played Logue in the 2002 television film Bertie and Elizabeth. Derek Lawson portrayed Logue in the 2015 comedy A Royal Night Out.

== See also ==
- Speech and language pathology
- British Stammering Association
