= The King's Speech =

2010 film by Tom Hooper

- British theatrical release poster
- Directed by: Tom Hooper
- Written by: David Seidler
- Produced by: Iain Canning; Emile Sherman; Gareth Unwin
- Starring: Colin Firth; Geoffrey Rush; Helena Bonham Carter; Guy Pearce; Timothy Spall; Derek Jacobi; Jennifer Ehle; Michael Gambon
- Cinematography: Danny Cohen
- Edited by: Tariq Anwar
- Music by: Alexandre Desplat
- Production companies: UK Film Council; Momentum Pictures; Aegis Film Fund; Molinare; FilmNation Entertainment; See-Saw Films; Bedlam Productions
- Distributed by: Momentum Pictures (United Kingdom); Paramount Pictures Transmission Films (Australia)
- Release dates: 6 September 2010 (Telluride Film Festival); 23 December 2010 (Australia); 7 January 2011 (United Kingdom)
- Running time: 119 minutes
- Countries: United Kingdom; Australia
- Language: English
- Budget: $15 million
- Box office: $414.2 million

The King's Speech is a 2010 historical drama film directed by Tom Hooper and written by David Seidler. Colin Firth plays the future King George VI who, to cope with a stammer, sees Lionel Logue, an Australian speech and language therapist played by Geoffrey Rush. The men become friends as they work together, and after his brother abdicates the throne, the new king relies on Logue to help him make his first wartime radio broadcast upon Britain's declaration of war on Germany in 1939.

Seidler read about George VI's life after learning to manage a stuttering condition he developed during his youth. He started writing about the relationship between the therapist and his royal patient as early as the 1980s, but at the request of the King's widow, Queen Elizabeth the Queen Mother, postponed work until she died in 2002. He later rewrote his screenplay for the stage to focus on the essential relationship between the two protagonists. Nine weeks before filming began, the filmmakers learned of the existence of notes written by Logue that were being used by his grandson Mark and Peter Conradi as the basis of a book, and were granted permission to incorporate material from the notes and book into the script.

Principal photography took place in London and around Britain from November 2009 to January 2010. Hard light was used to give the story a greater resonance and wider-than-normal lenses were employed to recreate the Duke of York's feelings of constriction. A third technique Hooper employed was the off-centre framing of characters.

The King's Speech was a major box office and critical success. It was widely praised by film critics for its visual style, screenplay, directing, score, and acting. Other commentators discussed the film's representation of historical detail, especially the reversal of Winston Churchill's opposition to abdication. The film received many awards and nominations, particularly for Colin Firth's performance. At the 83rd Academy Awards, The King's Speech received 12 Oscar nominations, more than any other film in that year, and subsequently won four, including Best Picture and Best Actor for Firth. Censors initially gave it adult ratings due to profanity, though these were later revised downward after criticism by the makers and distributors in the UK and some instances of swearing were muted in the US. On a budget of £8 million, it earned over £250 million internationally.

== Plot ==
At the official closing of the British Empire Exhibition at Wembley Stadium, Prince Albert "Bertie", Duke of York, the second son of King George V, addresses the crowd with a strong stammer. His search for treatment has been discouraging, but his wife, Elizabeth, persuades him to see Australian-born Lionel Logue, a speech defects therapist. During their first session, Lionel has Bertie recite Hamlet's "To be, or not to be" soliloquy while listening to classical music over a pair of headphones. Bertie is frustrated, but Lionel gives him the acetate recording of the reading to take home with him.

After George V broadcasts his 1934 Royal Christmas Message, he explains to Bertie that the wireless will play a significant part in the role of the royal family, allowing them to enter the homes of the people. As Bertie's elder brother, the Prince of Wales (known to his family as David), has been neglecting his responsibilities, Bertie's training in using the wireless has become necessary. An attempt at reading the message himself is a failure. However, Bertie plays the recording Lionel gave him that night and is astonished at the lack of stutter. He returns for daily treatments to overcome the physical and psychological roots of his stutter.

George V dies in 1936. David ascends the throne as King Edward VIII. A constitutional crisis arises with Edward over a prospective marriage with twice-divorced American socialite Wallis Simpson. Edward, as the supreme governor of the Church of England, cannot marry her, even if her second divorce goes through, as both of her former husbands are still alive.

At an unscheduled session, Bertie expresses frustration that, while his speech has mostly improved, he still stammers when talking to David, simultaneously revealing the extent of Edward VIII's folly with Simpson. When Lionel insists that Bertie himself could make a good king, Bertie accuses him of treason and angrily quits Lionel.

Lionel and Bertie reconvene after King Edward decides to abdicate to marry. Bertie, urged by Prime Minister Stanley Baldwin, ascends the throne as King George VI and visits Lionel's home with his wife before their coronation. This is a surprise for Mrs. Logue when she learns who Lionel's client has been.

Bertie and Lionel's relationship is questioned by the King's advisors during preparations for his coronation in Westminster Abbey. The archbishop of Canterbury, Cosmo Gordon Lang, points out that George never sought advice from his advisors about his treatment and that Lionel lacks formal training. Lionel explains to an outraged Bertie that at the time he started with speech defects there were no formal qualifications; he started by giving help to returning Great War Australian soldiers who suffered from shell-shock. Bertie remains unconvinced until provoked to protest at Lionel's disrespect for King Edward the Confessor's Chair and the Stone of Scone. After realising he has just expressed himself in anger without impairment, Bertie is able to rehearse with Lionel and complete the ceremony.

As king, Bertie has a crisis when he must broadcast to Britain and the Empire following the declaration of war on Nazi Germany in 1939. Lionel is summoned to Buckingham Palace to prepare the king for his speech. Knowing the challenge that lies before him, Lang, Winston Churchill and Neville Chamberlain accompany for support.

Bertie and Logue are left in the broadcasting room. He delivers his speech with Logue conducting him, but eventually begins speaking freely. Logue mentions that Bertie still struggles enunciating w, to which Bertie replies, "I had to throw in a few so they'd know it was me."

As the Royal Family step onto the palace balcony and are applauded by the crowd, a title card explains that Logue was made Commander of the Royal Victorian Order for services to the Crown. He was always present at King George VI's speeches during the war and that they remained friends until the King's death from lung cancer in 1952.

== Cast ==
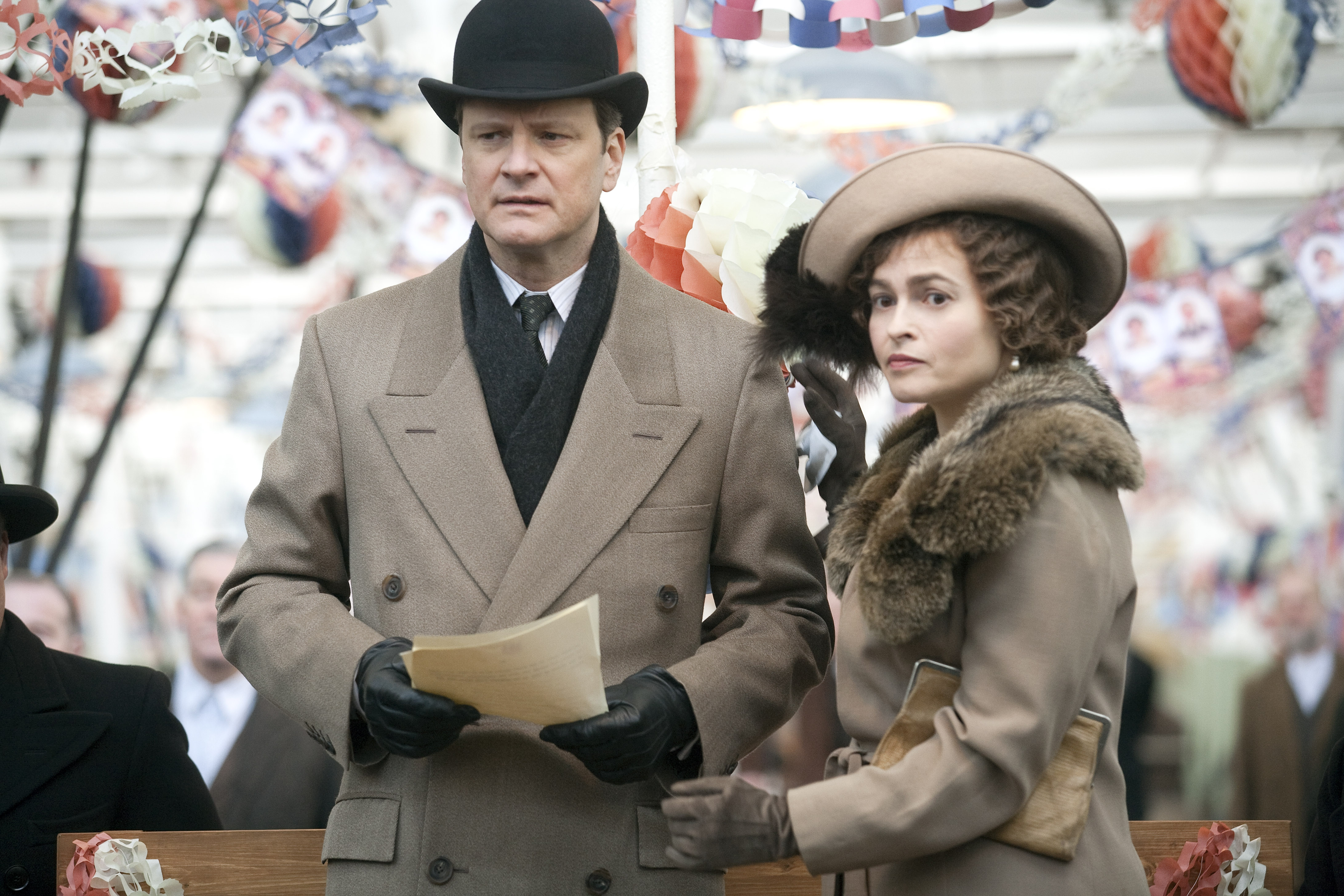
Colin Firth and Helena Bonham Carter as the Duke and Duchess of York

- Colin Firth as King George VI
- Geoffrey Rush as Lionel Logue
- Helena Bonham Carter as Queen Elizabeth
- Guy Pearce as King Edward VIII
- Timothy Spall as Winston Churchill
- Derek Jacobi as Cosmo Gordon Lang
- Jennifer Ehle as Myrtle Logue
- Michael Gambon as King George V
- Freya Wilson as Princess Elizabeth
- Ramona Marquez as Princess Margaret
- Patrick Ryecart as Lord Wigram
- Simon Chandler as Lord Dawson of Penn
- Claire Bloom as Queen Mary
- Orlando Wells as Prince George, Duke of Kent
- Tim Downie as Prince Henry, Duke of Gloucester
- Eve Best as Wallis Simpson
- Anthony Andrews as Stanley Baldwin
- Andrew Havill as Robert Wood
- Dominic Applewhite as Valentine Logue

== Production ==
=== Development ===
As a child, David Seidler developed a stammer, which he believes was caused by the emotional trauma of World War II and the murder of his grandparents during the Holocaust. King George VI's success in overcoming his stammer inspired the young Seidler, "Here was a stutterer who was a king and had to give radio speeches where everyone was listening to every syllable he uttered, and yet did so with passion and intensity." When Seidler became an adult, he resolved to write about King George VI. During the late 1970s and 1980s he voraciously researched the King, but found little information on Logue. Eventually Seidler contacted Valentine Logue, who agreed to discuss his father and make his notebooks available if the Queen Mother gave her permission. She asked him not to do so in her lifetime (as her memories of that era were "still too painful"), and Seidler respectfully halted the project.

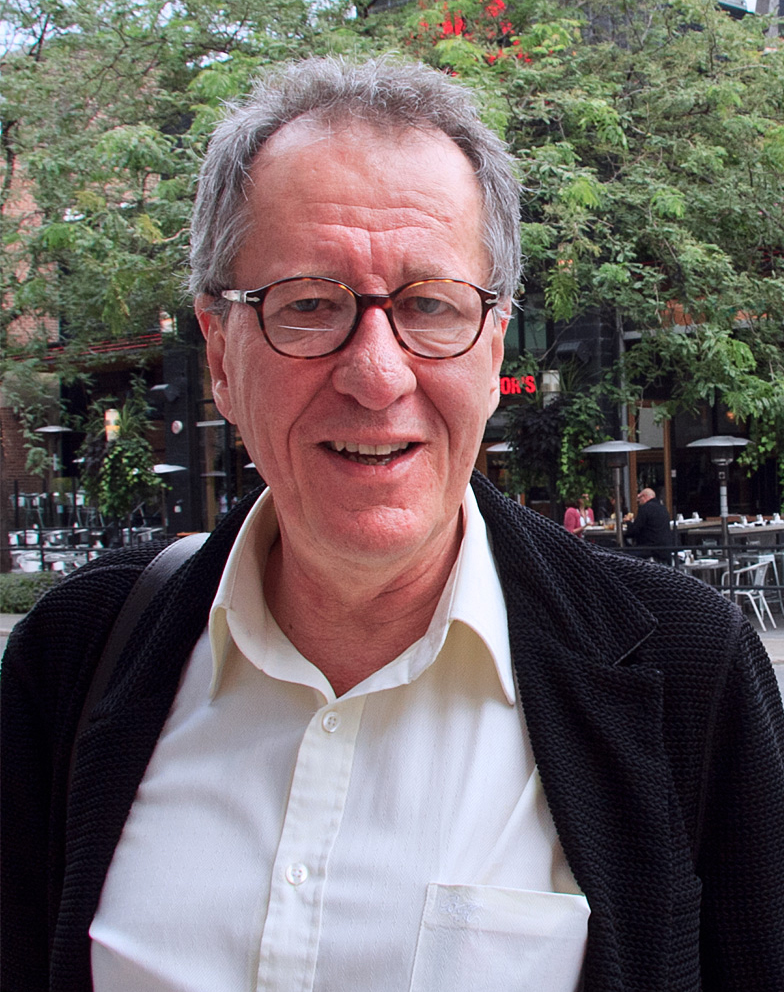
The film's producers broke etiquette by hand-delivering Geoffrey Rush the script. Rush eventually produced the film as well as performing in it.

The Queen Mother died in 2002. Three years later, Seidler returned to the story during a bout of creative work inspired by a recovery from cancer. His research, including a chance encounter with an uncle whom Logue had treated, indicated he used mechanical breathing exercises combined with psychological counselling to probe the underlying causes of the condition. Thus prepared, Seidler imagined the sessions. He showed the finished screenplay to his wife, who liked it, but pronounced it too "seduced by cinematic technique". She suggested he rewrite it as a stage play to focus on the essential relationship between the King and Logue. After he had completed it, he sent it to a few friends who worked in theatre in London and New York for feedback.

In 2005 a small production company in London, received the script. The owner Joan Lane started talking with Simon Egan and Gareth Unwin of Bedlam Productions, and they invited Seidler to London to rewrite the play again, this time for the screen. Together, they and Bedlam Productions organised a reading of the play in Pleasance Theatre, a small house in north London, to a group of Australian expatriates, among whom was Tom Hooper's mother, Meredith Hooper. She called her son and said, "I've found your next project".

Instead of trying to contact Geoffrey Rush's agent, Lane asked an Australian staff member to hand-deliver the script to Rush's house, not far away from hers in Melbourne. Unwin reports that he received a four-page e-mail from Rush's manager admonishing them for the breach of etiquette, but ending with an invitation to discuss the project further. Iain Canning from See-Saw Films became involved and, in Gareth Unwin's words: "We worked with ex-chair of BAFTA Richard Price, and started turning this story about two grumpy men sitting in a room into something bigger." Hooper liked the story, but thought that the original ending needed to be changed to reflect events more closely: "Originally, it had a Hollywood ending ... If you hear the real speech, he's clearly coping with his stammer. But it's not a perfect performance. He's managing it."

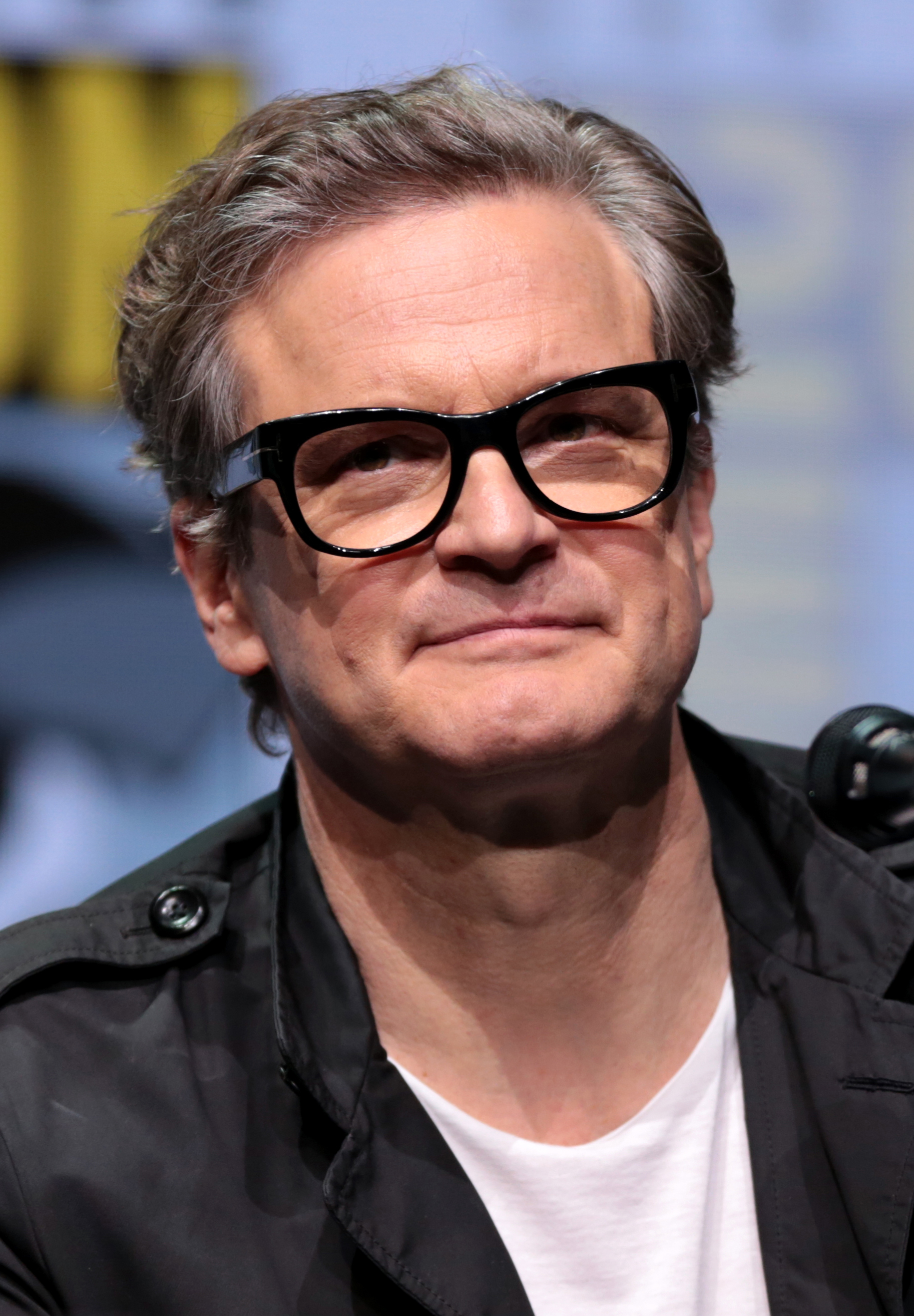
Colin Firth's performance earned him a BAFTA and an Academy Award, among other accolades

The production team learned – some nine weeks prior to the start of filming – of a diary containing Logue's original notes on his treatment of the Duke, which was in the process of being turned into a non-fiction book by Logue's grandson Mark and journalist Peter Conradi, titled The King's Speech: How One Man Saved the British Monarchy. Striking an agreement with the authors, they then went back and re-worked the script to reflect what was in the notes and the book. Some lines, such as at the climax, when Logue smiles and says, "You still stammered on the W" to the King, who replies, "I had to throw in a few so they would know it was me" were direct quotations from Logue's notes. Changes from the script to reflect the historical record included Michael Gambon improvising the ramblings of George V as he signed away authority, and the decision in the opening scene to dress the Duke in an overcoat rather than regal finery.

Seidler thought Paul Bettany would be a good choice to play King George VI, while Hooper preferred Hugh Grant, though both actors declined the offer. Once they met with Firth and heard him read for the part, Seidler and Hooper were convinced of his suitability for the role.

The UK Film Council awarded the production £1 million in June 2009. Filming began in December 2009, and lasted 39 days. Most was shot in the three weeks before Christmas because Rush would be performing in a play in January. The schedule was further complicated by Bonham Carter's availability: she worked on Harry Potter during the week, so her scenes had to be filmed during the weekend.

=== Location and design ===
The film depicted both regal opulence and scruffy, depression-era London. On 25 November 2009 the crew took over the Pullens buildings in Southwark and gave it the appearance of a street from 1930s London. Large advertisements for (among other things) Bovril and fascism were added to walls, and grit and grime to streets and buildings. To reproduce London smog of the time – thick enough that cars might need guidance from someone walking ahead – so much artificial smoke was used that fire alarms were triggered.

On 26 November, a week's filming with Firth, Rush, and Jacobi began at Ely Cathedral, the location used for Westminster Abbey. The production had asked for permission to film in the Abbey but were denied due to the demands of tourism. Though Lincoln Cathedral is architecturally a closer match to the Abbey, they preferred Ely, a favoured filming location. Its size allowed them to build sets showing not just the coronation, but the preparations before it.

Lancaster House, an opulent government-owned period house in London, was rented (at £20,000 per day) for interior scenes of Buckingham Palace. The 1936 Accession Council at St. James's Palace, where George VI swore an oath, was filmed in the Livery Hall of Drapers' Hall. The room, ornate and vast, met the occasion: the daunting nature of the new King's responsibilities was shown by surrounding him with rich detail, flags and royal portraiture.

The crew investigated Logue's former consultation rooms, but they were too small to film in. Instead, they found a high, vaulted room not far away in 33 Portland Place. Eve Stewart, the production designer, liked the mottled, peeling wallpaper there so much that she recreated the effect throughout the entire room. In his DVD commentary, Hooper said he liked Portland Place as a set because it felt "lived in", unlike other period houses in London. The scenes of the Duke of York at home with his family were also filmed here; showing the Prince living in a townhouse "subverted" expectations of a royal drama.

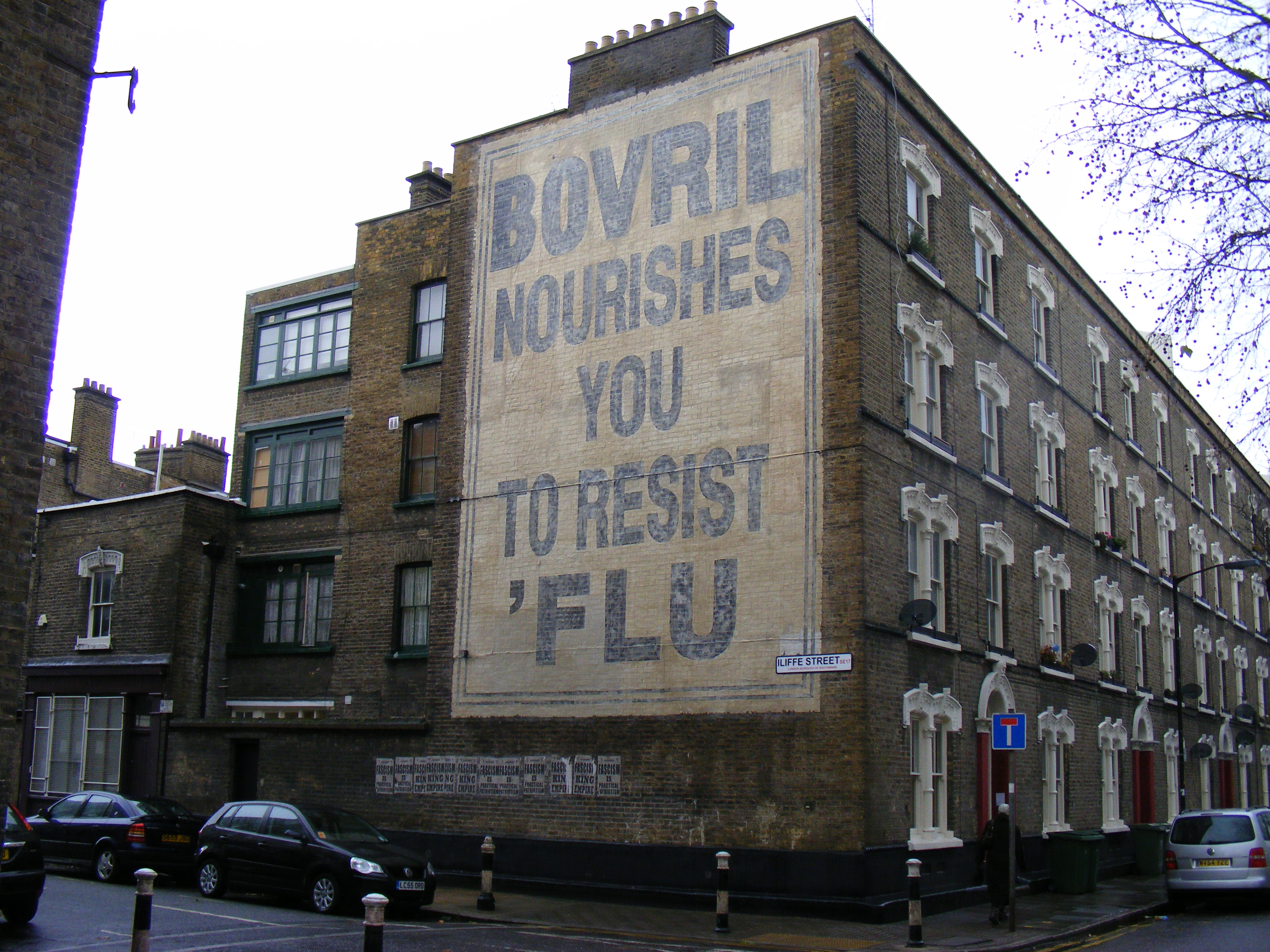
The Pullens buildings with a 1930s advertisement

The opening scene, set at the closing ceremony of the 1925 British Empire Exhibition at Wembley Stadium, was filmed on location at Elland Road, home of Leeds United, and Odsal Stadium, home of Bradford RLFC. Elland Road was used for the speech elements of the prince stammering his way through his first public address, and Odsal Stadium was selected because of the resemblance of its curved ends to Wembley Stadium in 1925. The crew had access to the stadium only at 10 pm, after a football game. They filled the terraces with inflatable dummies and over 250 extras dressed in period costumes. Live actors were interspersed to give the impression of a crowd. Additional people, as well as more ranks of soldiers on the pitch, were added in post-production with visual effects.

Other locations include Cumberland Lodge, Harley Street, Knebworth, Hatfield House, the Old Royal Naval College in Greenwich, Queen Street Mill Textile Museum in Burnley, and Battersea Power Station, which doubled as a BBC wireless control room. The final cut of the film was completed on 31 August 2010.

=== Dialogue ===
In developing his portrayal of George VI's stammer, Firth worked with Neil Swain, the voice coach for the film. His sister, Kate Firth, also a professional voice coach to actors, proposed exercises the King might have done with Logue, and made suggestions on how to imagine Logue's mix of physical and psychological coaching for the film.

In addition, Firth watched archive footage of the King speaking. In an interview with Allan Tyrer published by the British Stammering Association, Swain said: "[It] was very interesting while we were working on the film just to think tonally how far we could go and should go with the strength of George's stammer. I think a less courageous director than Tom [Hooper] – and indeed a less courageous actor than Colin [Firth] – might have felt the need to slightly sanitise the degree and authenticity of that stammer, and I'm really really pleased that neither of them did." In May 2011 Firth said he was finding traces of the stammer difficult to eliminate: "You can probably hear even from this interview, there are moments when it's quite infectious. You find yourself doing it and if I start thinking about it the worse it gets. If nothing else it's an insight into what it feels like."

=== Music ===
The film's original music is composed by Alexandre Desplat, which consisted of a sparse arrangement of strings and piano. The London Symphony Orchestra, conducted by Terry Davies, limited orchestral score by only adding oboe and harp in one cut, to convey the character of the king, while also using single note to represent the stickiness of the King's speech. Old microphones extracted from the EMI archives, specially made for the royal family, had been used to record the score, to create a dated sound.

The use of the 2nd movement (Allegretto) of Beethoven's 7th Symphony, played during the broadcast of the 1939 radio speech from the film's climax, was played as a temp track added by editor Tariq Anwar. Desplat did not want to change the track and defended Anwar's suggestion, as the theme has a universal quality. Hooper further remarked that the stature of the piece helps elevate the status of the speech to a public event. The score album also featured the second movement of Beethoven's Piano Concerto No. 5 "Emperor" and Wolfgang Amadeus Mozart's Marriage of Figaro overture. The score was nominated for several awards, including Best Original Score at the Oscars, Golden Globes, and BAFTAs, winning the latter award. The score also won a Grammy at the 54th Grammy Awards.

== Visual style ==
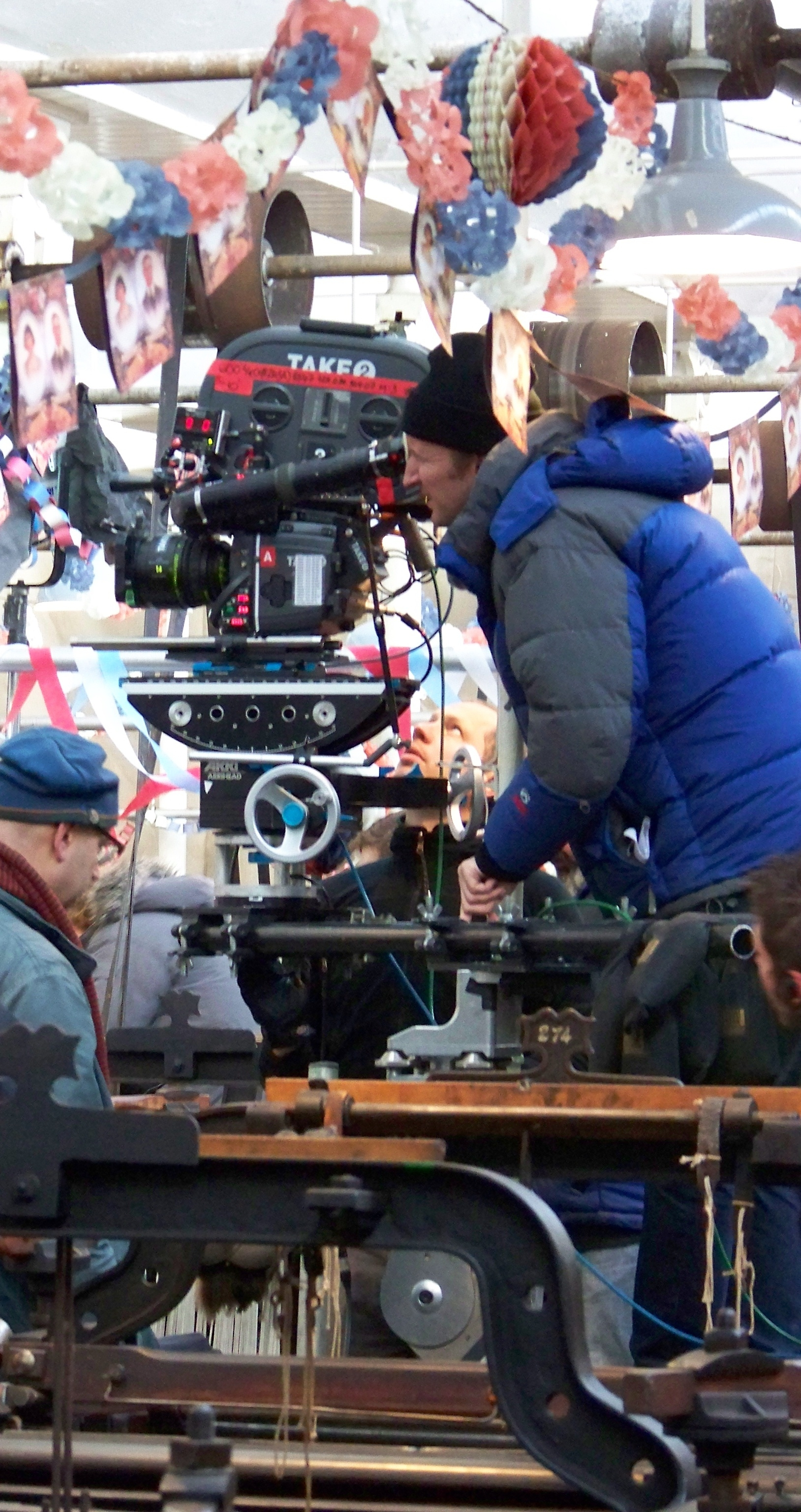
Tom Hooper operating a camera on location at Queen Street Mill Textile Museum, Lancashire

Hooper employed a number of cinematic techniques to evoke the King's feelings of constriction. He and cinematographer Danny Cohen used wider than normal lenses to photograph the film, typically 14mm, 18mm, 21mm, 25mm and 27mm, where the subtle distortion of the picture helps to convey the King's discomfort. For instance, the subjective point of view shot during the Empire exhibition speech used a close up of the microphone with a wider lens, similar to the filming technique used for one of the Duke's early consultations with a physician. In The New York Times, Manohla Dargis wrote that the feeling of entrapment inside the King's head was rendered overly literal with what she believed to be a fisheye lens, though in these scenes the wider lenses were used. Hooper also discussed using the 18mm lens, one he likes "because it puts human beings in their context".

Roger Ebert noted that the majority of the film was shot indoors, where oblong sets, corridors, and small spaces manifest constriction and tightness, in contrast to the usual emphasis on sweep and majesty in historical dramas. Hooper used wide shots to capture the actors' body language, particularly that of Geoffrey Rush, who trained at L'École Internationale de Théâtre Jacques Lecoq in Paris and "is consequently brilliant in the way he carries his body". Hooper widened his scope first to capture Rush's gestures, then full body movements and silhouettes. The approach carried over to Firth as well. In the first consultation scene, the Duke is squeezed against the end of a long couch framed against a large wall, "as if to use the arm of the sofa as a kind of friend, as a security blanket?" Martin Filler praised the "low-wattage" cinematography of Danny Cohen's, as making everything look like it has been "steeped in strong tea".

At other times, the camera was positioned very close to the actors to catch the emotion in their faces: "If you put a lens 6 inches from somebody's face, you get more emotion than if you're on a long lens 20 feet away," Cohen said in an interview. Hooper sought a second subtlety while filming the first consultation room scene between the two men, having placed the camera 18 inches from Colin Firth's face: "I wanted the nervousness of the first day to percolate into his performances," he said.

Historical dramas traditionally tend to use "soft light", but Hooper wanted to use a harsher glare, which gives a more contemporary feel, and thus a greater emotional resonance. To achieve the effect, the lighting team erected huge blackout tents over the Georgian buildings and used large lights filtered through Egyptian cotton.

== Historical accuracy ==
Several events in the film did not happen, or were exaggerated. The visual blog Information is Beautiful deduced that, while taking creative licence into account, the film was 74.4% accurate when compared to real-life events, summarising: "Some nips and tucks of the historical record, but mostly an accurate retelling of a unique friendship".

=== Relationship with Lionel Logue ===
The filmmakers not only tightened the chronology of the events to just a few years but even shifted the timeline of treatment. The Duke of York actually began working with Logue in October 1926, ten years before the abdication crisis, and the improvement in his speech was apparent in months rather than years as suggested by the film. When he was dispatched to Australia to open their new Parliament House in Canberra in 1927, the Duke gave numerous speeches during the journey and performed well despite Logue not accompanying him on the trip. He wrote to Logue from the Caribbean, "You remember my fear of 'The King'. I give it every evening at dinner on board. This does not worry me any more." Of his speech opening Parliament it was observed that he spoke "resonantly and without stuttering".

Robert Logue, a grandson of Lionel, doubted the film's depiction of the speech therapist, stating: "I don't think he ever swore in front of the King and he certainly never called him 'Bertie'." Andrew Roberts, an English historian, states that the severity of the King's stammer was exaggerated and the characters of Edward VIII, Wallis Simpson, and George V made more antagonistic than they really were, to increase the dramatic effect.

=== Politics ===
Christopher Hitchens and Isaac Chotiner criticised the film for failing to indict the appeasement of the era or to portray Edward VIII's sympathetic attitude to Nazi Germany. The Guardian also corrected the portrayal of Stanley Baldwin as having resigned due to his refusal to order Britain's re-armament, when he in fact stepped down as "a national hero, exhausted by more than a decade at the top". Stanley's grandson, Earl Baldwin, was particularly unhappy with this film due to its factual distortions and portrayal of his grandfather as a dithering fool who misunderstood Hitler's intentions.

Hugo Vickers, an adviser on the film, agreed that the alteration of historical details to preserve the essence of the dramatic story was sometimes necessary. The high-ranking officials, for instance, would not have been present when the King made his speech, nor would Churchill have been involved at any level, "but the average viewer knows who Churchill is; he doesn't know who Lord Halifax and Sir Samuel Hoare are."

Hitchens and Chotiner also challenged the film's portrayal of Winston Churchill's role in the abdication crisis. It is well established that Churchill encouraged Edward VIII to resist pressure to abdicate, whereas he is portrayed in the film as supportive of the Duke of York and not opposed to the abdication. Hitchens attributes this treatment to the "cult" surrounding Churchill's legacy. In a smart, well-made film "would the true story not have been fractionally more interesting for the audience?", he wondered.

=== Realism ===
Martin Filler acknowledged that the film legitimately used artistic licence to make valid dramatic points, such as in the probably imagined scene when George V lectures his son on the importance of broadcasting. Filler cautions that George VI would never have tolerated Logue addressing him casually, nor swearing, and the King almost certainly would have understood a newsreel of Hitler speaking in German. Filler makes the larger point that both the King and his wife were, in reality, lukewarm towards Churchill because of the latter's support for his brother during the abdication crisis.

Commenting on the film's final scene on the balcony of Buckingham Palace, Andrew Roberts has written: "The scene is fairly absurd from a historical point of view – Neville Chamberlain and Winston Churchill were not present and there were no cheering crowds outside Buckingham Palace." However, Roberts praises the film overall as a sympathetic portrayal of the King's "quiet, unassuming heroism [...] The portrayals by Firth and Bonham Carter are sympathetic and acute, and the movie's occasional factual bêtises should not detract from that."

== Release ==
=== Cinema release ===
The film had its world première on 6 September 2010 at the Telluride Film Festival in the United States. It was screened at the 2010 Toronto International Film Festival, on 10 September 2010, where it received a standing ovation and won the People's Choice Award. The cinema release poster was re-designed to show an extreme close-up of Firth's jaw and a microphone after Hooper criticised the first design as a "train smash". Tim Appelo called the original, air-brushed effort, which showed the three leads, "shockingly awful" though the new one "really is worthwhile".

The film was distributed by Transmission Films in Australia and by Momentum Pictures in the United Kingdom. The Weinstein Company distributed it in North America, Germany, the Benelux countries, Scandinavia, China, Hong Kong, and Latin America. The film was released in France on 2 February 2011 by Wild Bunch under the title Le discours d'un roi.

=== Ratings controversy ===
The film was originally given a 15 classification by the British Board of Film Classification (BBFC) due to the use of strong language. At the time, BBFC guidelines at 12A / 12 stated that: "The use of strong language (for example, ‘fuck’) must be infrequent."

The film contains two scenes in which the character of King George VI uses strong language several times at the instigation of his speech therapist, resulting in the term being used around 17 times in total.

At the London Film Festival, Hooper criticised the decision, questioning how the board could certify the film "15" for bad language but allow films such as Salt (2010) and Casino Royale (2006) to have "12A" ratings, despite their graphic torture scenes. Following Hooper's criticism, the board lowered the rating to "12A", allowing children under 12 years of age to see the film if they are accompanied by an adult. Hooper levelled the same criticism at the Motion Picture Association of America, which gave the film an "R" rating, preventing anyone under the age of 17 from seeing the film without an adult. In his review, Roger Ebert criticised the "R" rating, calling it "utterly inexplicable", and wrote, "This is an excellent film for teenagers."

In January 2011 Harvey Weinstein, the executive producer and distributor, said he was considering having the film re-edited to remove some profanity, so that it would receive a lower classification and reach a larger audience. Hooper refused to cut the film, though he considered covering the swear words with bleeps. Helena Bonham Carter also defended the film, saying, "[The film] is not violent. It's full of humanity and wit. [It's] for people not with just a speech impairment, but who have got confidence [doubts]." After receiving his Academy Award, Colin Firth noted that he does not support re-editing the film; while he does not condone the use of profanity, he maintains that its use was not offensive in this context. "The scene serves a purpose", Firth states. An alternative version, with some of the profanities muted out, was classified as "PG-13" in the United States; this version was released to cinemas on 1 April 2011, replacing the R-rated one. The PG-13 version of this film is not available on DVD and Blu-ray.

== Reception ==
=== Box office ===
In Great Britain and Ireland, the film was the highest earning film on its opening weekend. It took in £3,510,000 from 395 cinemas. The Guardian said that it was one of the biggest takes in recent memory, and compared it to Slumdog Millionaire (2008), which, two years earlier, earned £1.5 million less. The King's Speech continued a "stunning three weeks" atop the UK Box office, and earned over £3 million for four consecutive weekends, the first film to do so since Toy Story 3 (2010). After five weeks on UK release, it was hailed as the most successful independent British film ever.

In the United States The King's Speech opened with $355,450 (£220,000) in four cinemas. It holds the record for the highest per-cinema gross of 2010. It was widened to 700 screens on Christmas Day and 1,543 screens on 14 January 2011. It eventually made $139 million in the U.S. and Canada overall.

In Australia The King's Speech made more than A$6,281,686 (£4 million) in the first two weeks, according to figures collected by the Motion Picture Distributors Association of Australia. The executive director of Palace Cinemas, Benjamin Zeccola, said customer feedback on the film was spectacular. "It's our No.1 for all the period, all throughout the country. ... I think this is more successful than Slumdog Millionaire and a more uplifting film. It's a good example of a film that started out in the independent cinemas and then spread to the mainstream cinemas."

Of the film's net profit of some $30–40 million (£20–25 million) from the cinema release alone, about a fifth was shared between Geoffrey Rush (as executive producer), Tom Hooper and Colin Firth, with the remainder being divided equally between the film's producers and its equity investors. The UK Film Council invested £1 million of public funds from the United Kingdom lottery into the film. In March 2011 Variety estimated that the return could be between fifteen and twenty times that. The council's merger into the British Film Institute means that the profits were to be returned to that body.

=== Critical response ===
As the actor of the year in the film of the year, I can't think of enough adjectives to praise Firth properly. The King's Speech has left me speechless.

— Rex Reed, New York Observer

The King's Speech has received widespread critical acclaim, with Firth's performance receiving universal praise. Bonham Carter and Rush were also widely praised with both going on to win BAFTAs and receiving Academy Award nominations. Review aggregator Rotten Tomatoes gives the film a score of 94% based on reviews from 297 critics; the film's average rating was calculated as 8.60/10. The website's critical consensus reads: "Colin Firth gives a masterful performance in The King's Speech, a predictable but stylishly produced and rousing period drama." Metacritic gave the film a weighted score of 88/100, based on 41 critical reviews, which indicates "universal acclaim". CinemaScore reported that audiences gave the film a rare "A+" grade.

Empire gave the film five stars out of five, commenting, "You'll be lost for words." Lisa Kennedy of The Denver Post gave the film full marks for its humane qualities and craftsmanship: "It is an intelligent, winning drama fit for a king – and the rest of us", she said. Roger Ebert of the Chicago Sun-Times awarded the film a full four stars, commenting that "what we have here is a superior historical drama and a powerful personal one." Peter Bradshaw of The Guardian gave four stars out of five, stating, "Tom Hooper's richly enjoyable and handsomely produced movie ... is a massively confident crowd-pleaser."

Manohla Dargis, while generally ambivalent towards the film, called the lead performances one of its principal attractions. "With their volume turned up, the appealing, impeccably professional Mr. Firth and Mr. Rush rise to the acting occasion by twinkling and growling as their characters warily circle each other before settling into the therapeutic swing of things and unknowingly preparing for the big speech that partly gives the film its title," she wrote. The Daily Telegraph called Guy Pearce's performance as Edward VIII "formidable ... with glamour, charisma and utter self-absorption". Empire said he played the role well as "a flash harry flinty enough to shed a nation for a wife." The New York Times thought he was able to create "a thorny tangle of complications in only a few abbreviated scenes". Hooper praised the actor in the DVD commentary, saying he "nailed" the 1930s royal accent. Richard Corliss of Time magazine named Colin Firth's performance one of the Top 10 Movie Performances of 2010.

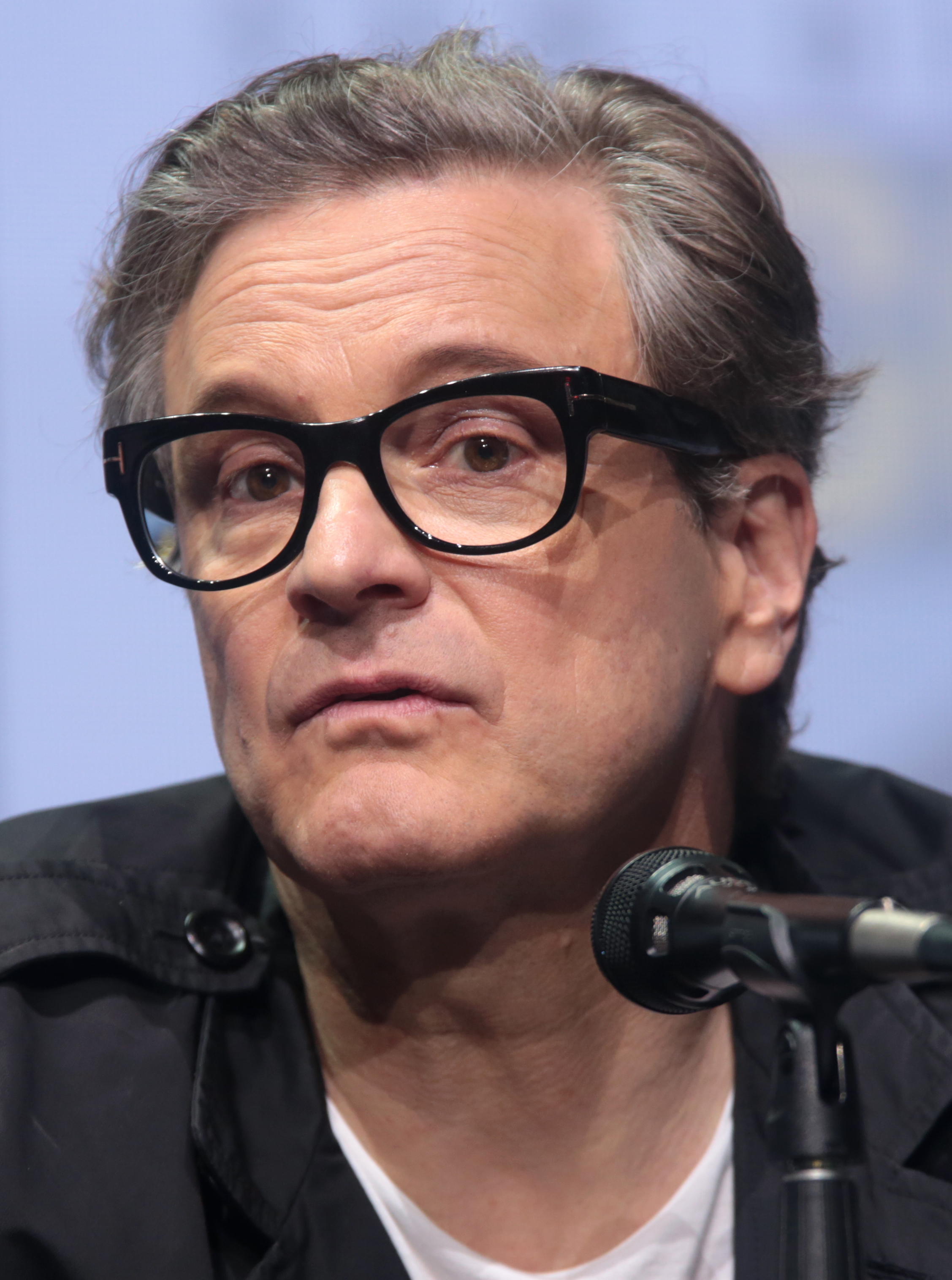
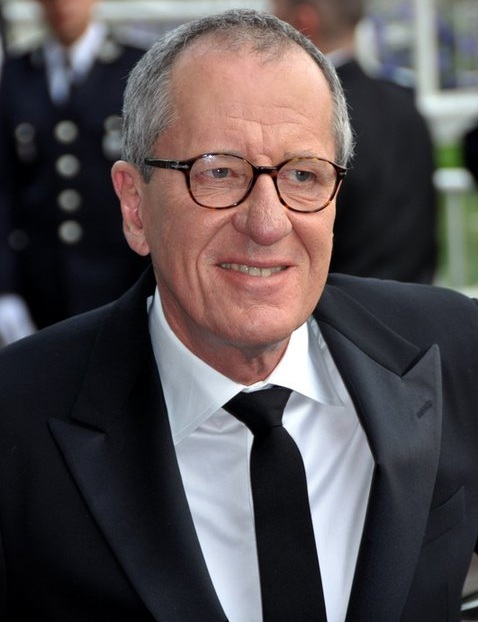
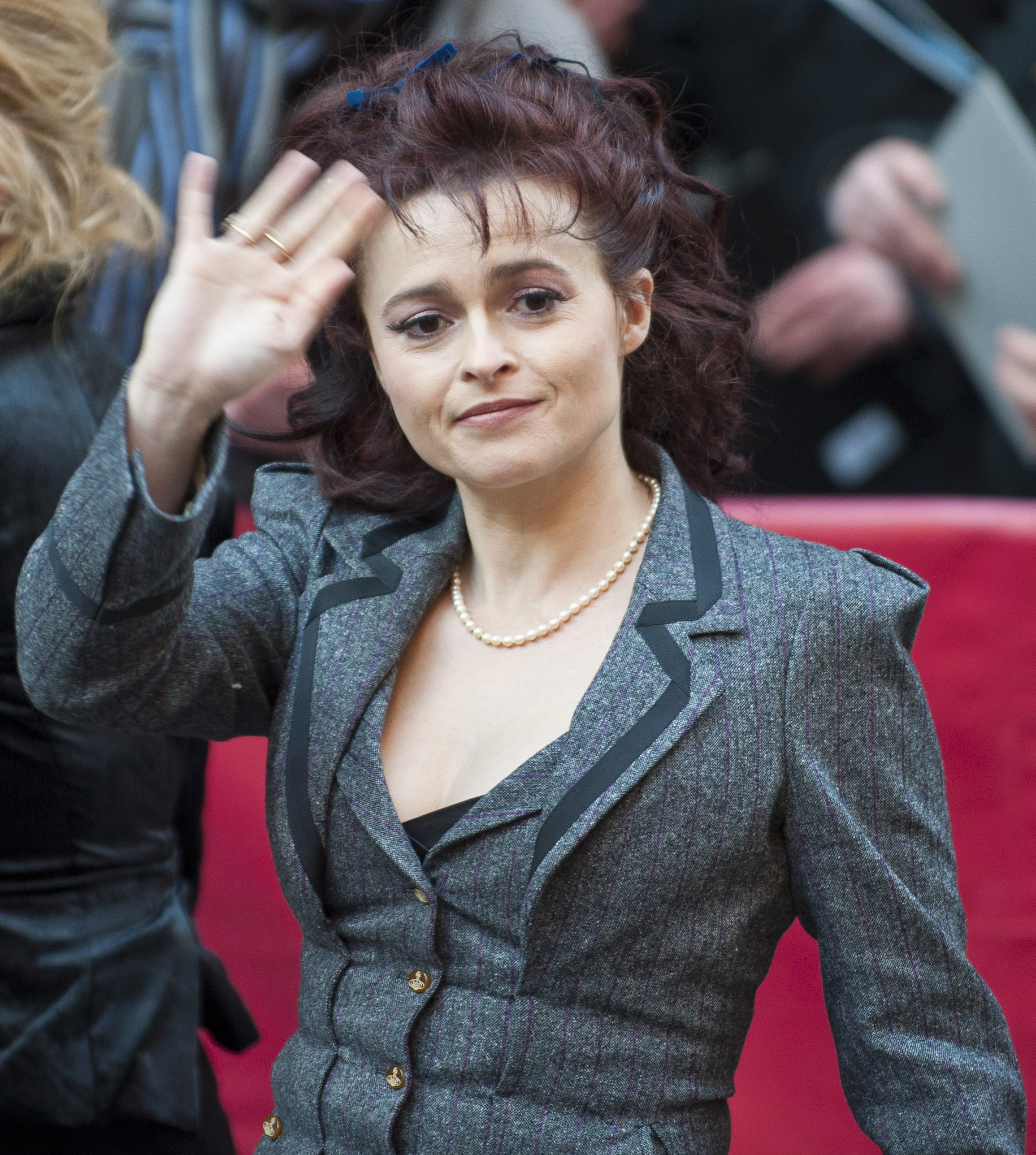
The performances of Colin Firth, Geoffrey Rush and Helena Bonham Carter received critical acclaim, earning them Academy Award nominations for Best Actor, Best Supporting Actor and Best Supporting Actress respectively, with Firth winning his category.

AlloCiné, a French cinema website, gave the film an average of four out of five stars, based on a survey of 21 reviews. Le Monde, which characterised the film as the "latest manifestation of British narcissism" and summarised it as "We are ugly and boring, but, By Jove!, we are right!", nevertheless admired the performances of Firth, Rush, and Bonham Carter. It said that, though the film swept British appeasement under the carpet, it was still enjoyable.

Queen Elizabeth II, the daughter and successor of King George VI, was sent two copies of the film before Christmas 2010. The Sun newspaper reported she had watched the film in a private screening at Sandringham House. A palace source described her reaction as being "touched by a moving portrayal of her father". Seidler called the reports "the highest honour" the film could receive.

In June 2025, filmmaker and entertainer Mel Brooks cited the film as among his favorites of the 21st century. In July 2025, it was one of the films voted for the "Readers' Choice" edition of The New York Times' list of "The 100 Best Movies of the 21st Century," finishing at number 238.

=== Depiction of stuttering ===
The British Stammering Association welcomed the release of The King's Speech, congratulating the film makers on their "realistic depiction of the frustration and the fear of speaking faced by people who stammer on a daily basis." It said that "Colin Firth's portrayal of the King's stammer in particular strikes us as very authentic and accurate." The Royal College of Speech and Language Therapists welcomed the film, and launched their "Giving Voice" campaign around the time of its commercial release.

Disfluency advocate Jonah Lehrer called the film "an inspiring tale" and praised its portrayal of the troubles suffered by Firth's character. However, Lehrer and other advocates criticized the film's depiction of stuttering as a result of emotional repression and childhood trauma. The treatment performed by Rush's character also drew criticism. Lehrer did admit it was a necessary artistic license: "[the film] would have been a rather tedious piece of entertainment if the climactic scene involved Logue telling the monarch that his primary motor cortex was to blame."

Science journalist Jeremy Hsu wrote that the film "mainly succeeds by tackling the social stigma that surrounds stuttering." However, similar to Lehrer, he disapproved that it perpetuated myths about the condition, namely its relationship with childhood trauma and overly strict parenting.

Columnist Jane Ahlin praised the film as it "brings out of the shadows a common problem figuring into the lives of children and adults from every culture around the world." At the same time, she stated, "heartwarming though the movie The King's Speech is, as someone who married a stutterer and is the mother of a stutterer, I'm not sure it does anything to put myths about stuttering to rest." She criticized the depiction of family and social dynamics as causes of the condition, as well as the portrayal of stutterering as connected to emotional or psychological problems.

=== Awards and nominations ===
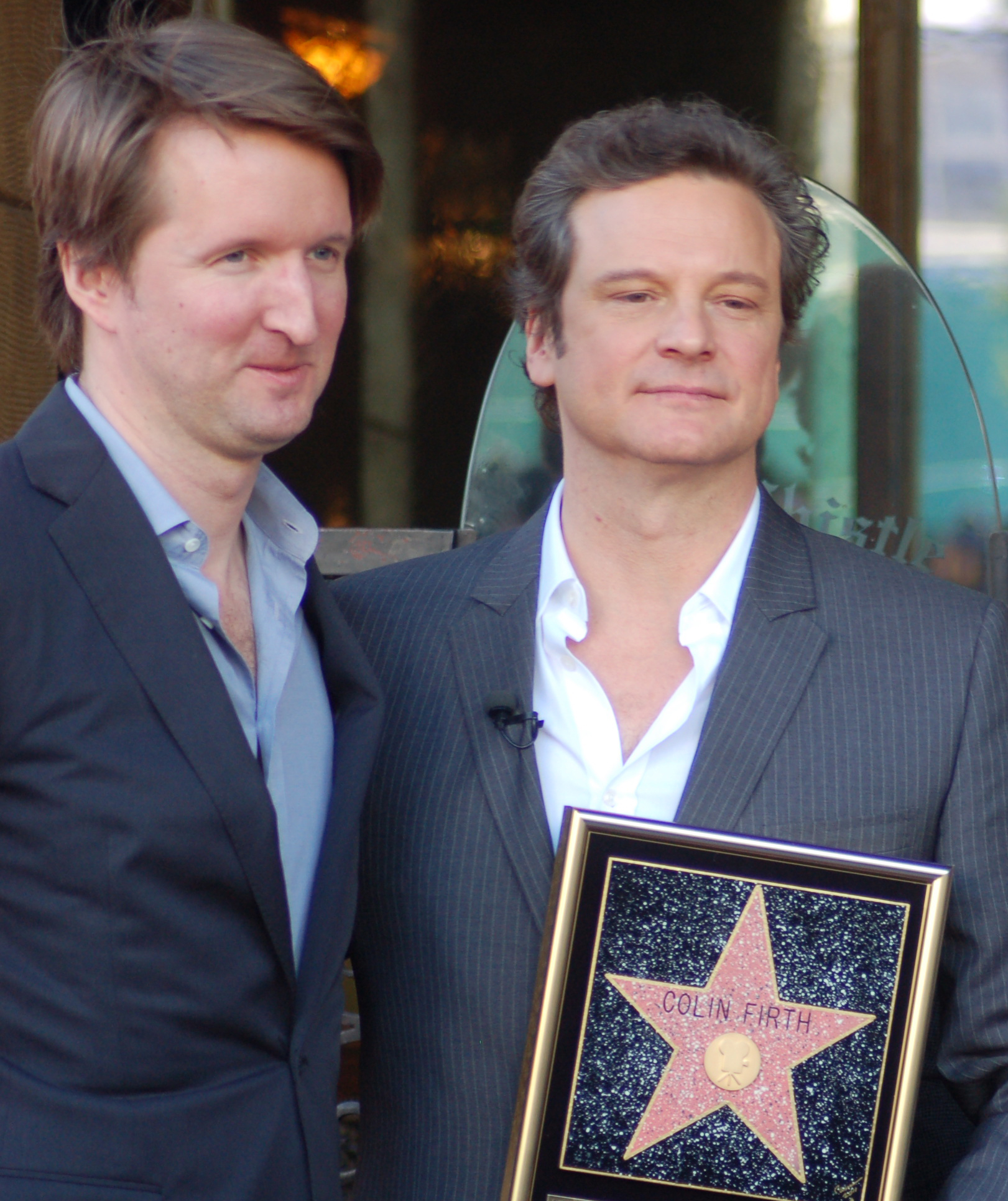
Hooper and Firth in January 2011; each received multiple award nominations for their work

At the 83rd Academy Awards, The King's Speech won the Academy Award for Best Picture, Best Director (Hooper), Best Actor (Firth), and Best Original Screenplay (Seidler). The film had received 12 Oscar nominations, more than any other film in that year. Besides the four categories it won, the film received nominations for Best Cinematography (Danny Cohen) and two for the supporting actors (Bonham Carter and Rush), as well as two for its mise-en-scène: Art Direction and Costumes.

At the 64th British Academy Film Awards, it won seven awards, including Best Film, Outstanding British Film, Best Actor for Firth, Best Supporting Actor for Rush, Best Supporting Actress for Bonham Carter, Best Original Screenplay for Seidler, and Best Music for Alexandre Desplat. The film had been nominated for 14 BAFTAs, more than any other film. At the 68th Golden Globe Awards, Firth won for Best Actor. The film won no other Golden Globes, despite earning seven nominations, more than any other film.

At the 17th Screen Actors Guild Awards, Firth won the Best Actor award and the entire cast won Best Ensemble, meaning Firth went home with two acting awards in one evening. Hooper won the Directors Guild of America Awards 2010 for Best Director. The film won the Darryl F. Zanuck Award for Best Theatrical Motion Picture at the Producers Guild of America Awards 2010.

The King's Speech won the People's Choice Award at the 2010 Toronto International Film Festival, Best British Independent Film at the 2010 British Independent Film Awards, and the 2011 Goya Award for Best European Film from the Academia de las Artes y las Ciencias Cinematográficas de España (Spanish Academy of Cinematic Art and Science). In 2021, members of Writers Guild of America West (WGAW) and Writers Guild of America, East (WGAE) voted its screenplay 73rd in WGA’s 101 Greatest Screenplays of the 21st Century (so far).

== See also ==
- Bertie & Elizabeth (2002), a television film which also addresses the stammering of the king (played by James Wilby). It was a co-production of PBS (Masterpiece Theatre) and Carlton Television.
- List of 2010 films based on actual events
