= Tom Hooper =

British-Australian film director

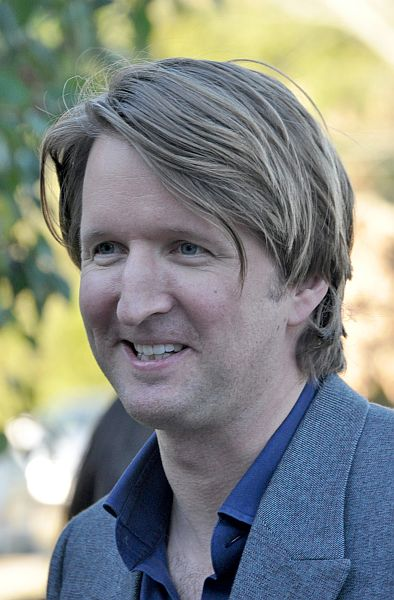
- Hooper in 2010
- Born: Thomas George Hooper; 5 October 1972 (age 53); London, England
- Citizenship: British; Australian
- Education: University College, Oxford
- Occupations: Director; producer; screenwriter
- Years active: 1992–present
- Parents: Richard Hooper (father); Meredith Hooper (mother)
- Awards: Full list

Thomas George Hooper (born 5 October 1972) is a British-Australian (Note: Hooper was born and raised in England and is the son of an English father and an Australian mother. He holds dual citizenship of the United Kingdom and Australia. Hooper self-identified in 2010 as "half-Australian and half-English and living in London".) filmmaker. Known for his work in film and television he has received numerous accolades including an Academy Award, a BAFTA Award, and Primetime Emmy Award as well as a nomination for Golden Globe Award.

Hooper began making short films as a teenager and had his first professional short, Painted Faces, broadcast on Channel 4 in 1992. At Oxford University, he directed plays and television commercials. After graduating, he directed episodes of Quayside, Byker Grove, EastEnders, and Cold Feet on British television. In the 2000s, Hooper directed the major BBC costume dramas Love in a Cold Climate (2001) and Daniel Deronda (2002), as well as the 2003 revival of ITV's Prime Suspect series. He gained acclaim for directing the HBO projects Elizabeth I (2005), Longford (2006), and John Adams (2008), the former of which earned him the Primetime Emmy Award for Outstanding Directing for a Limited Series or Movie.

Hooper made his feature film debut with the British drama Red Dust (2004) followed by the sports drama The Damned United (2009). He directed the historical drama The King's Speech (2010) which earned him the Academy Award for Best Director. He followed up with the musical epic Les Misérables (2012), and the romantic drama The Danish Girl (2015), the latter of which was nominated for the BAFTA Award for Outstanding British Film. He directed the 2019 live-action adaptation of the musical Cats, for which he won three Golden Raspberry Awards for Worst Director, Worst Picture, and Worst Screenplay. That same year he directed two episodes of the HBO fantasy series His Dark Materials (2019).

== Early life and education ==
Tom Hooper was born on 5 October 1972 in London, England, the son of Meredith Jean (Rooney) and Richard Hooper. Meredith was an Australian author and academic and Richard is an English media businessman. Hooper was educated at Highgate School and Westminster School. His initial interest in drama was triggered by his English and drama teacher at Highgate, former Royal Shakespeare Company actor Roger Mortimer, who produced an annual school play.

At the age of 12, Hooper read a book titled How to Make Film and Television and decided he wanted to become a director. For the next year Hooper researched filmmaking from publications such as On Camera by Harris Watts. Aged 13, he made his first film, entitled Runaway Dog, using a clockwork 16mm Bolex camera his uncle had given to him. Hooper said: "The clockwork would run out after thirty seconds, so the maximum shot length was thirty seconds. I could only afford a hundred feet of Kodachrome reversal film, which cost about twenty-five [pounds], and you had to send off for two weeks to be processed. I could only make silent movies, because sound was too expensive and complicated." He slowed down the frame rate of the camera so he could maximise what little film stock he had. Hooper classified the short, about a dog which kept running away from its owner, as a comedy, and filmed it on location in Oxfordshire.

When Hooper was 14, his film Bomber Jacket came runner-up in a BBC younger filmmakers' competition. The short starred Hooper's brother as a boy who discovers a bomber jacket and a photograph hidden in a cupboard and learns his grandfather died in World War II. Another of Hooper's short films, entitled Countryside, depicts a nuclear holocaust. (Note: The order of Hooper's early short films differs according to various sources; Fendelman (2011) states that Bomber Jacket was his second short, and Simmons (2011) states it was his third. Hooper is himself confused about the order in his audio commentary for The King's Speech DVD.)

Hooper finished school aged 16, then wrote the script for his first professional short film, entitled Painted Faces. He spent the next two years raising capital for the short by courting advertisement directors, whose financial dominance during the late 1980s was noticed by Hooper. Director Paul Weiland invested in the short, which provided Hooper with the equipment he needed. After two years of financing and production, Painted Faces was completed. Hooper wrote, produced, directed and edited it. It was sold to Channel 4 and broadcast on the channel's First Frame strand in 1992, had a screening at the 35th London Film Festival and had a limited theatrical release.

After taking a gap year to finance Painted Faces, Hooper read English at University College, Oxford. He joined the Oxford University Dramatic Society, where he directed Kate Beckinsale in A View from the Bridge and Emily Mortimer in The Trial. Hooper also had his first paid directing work, earning £200 for a corporate Christmas video, and he directed his first television advertisements, including one for Sonic the Hedgehog 3 featuring Right Said Fred. He continues to direct advertisements alongside television and film projects. In 1996 he joined the commercial production company John S. Clarke Productions and in 2001 he signed with Infinity Productions. (Note: Notable advertising campaigns directed by Hooper include 2006's Rooftop Tennis for Sony Ericsson's mobile phone range, and Dive, a spot for the 2011 Captain Morgan rum campaign To Life, Love and Loot.) Hooper has also directed commercials including an ad for Jaguar with Tom Hiddleston, Ben Kingsley, and Mark Strong, which aired during Super Bowl XLV. His commercial work is produced through international production company SMUGGLER.

== Career ==
=== 1997–2003: BBC and ITV productions ===
After graduating from Oxford, Hooper directed further television commercials, intending to break into the film industry the same way Ridley Scott, Tony Scott and Hugh Hudson did. He was introduced by his father to the television producer Matthew Robinson, who mentored Hooper and gave him his first television directing work. For Robinson, Hooper directed episodes of the short-lived Tyne Tees Television soap opera Quayside in 1997, four episodes of the Children's BBC television series Byker Grove in the same year, and his first episodes of the BBC One soap opera EastEnders in 1998.

Hooper directed several EastEnders episodes between 1998 and 2000, two of which were hour-long specials that represented the soap when it won the British Academy Television Award for Best Soap Opera in 2000 and 2001; the first was the episode in which Carol Jackson (Lindsey Coulson) learns her daughter Bianca (Patsy Palmer) had an affair with her fiancé Dan Sullivan (Craig Fairbrass). The Jackson episode marked the beginning of a week of episodes that led to Palmer's departure from the soap, and Robinson had hired Hooper to direct the key episodes of that storyline. Hooper worked 10-hour days on EastEnders, and learned to direct with speed. He was influenced in his early career by the cinematic style of American TV series such as ER, NYPD Blue and Homicide: Life on the Street and tried to work that style into his EastEnders episodes; one scene featuring Grant Mitchell (Ross Kemp) involved a crane shot, which Hooper believes made him infamous among the EastEnders production crew.

In 1999, Hooper directed two episodes of Granada Television's comedy-drama television series Cold Feet, which marked his move to bigger-budget productions. There was initially concern at Granada that Hooper might be an unsuitable director for the series given his background in drama.

In 2001, Hooper directed his first of two costume dramas for the BBC; Love in a Cold Climate was based on Nancy Mitford's novels The Pursuit of Love and Love in a Cold Climate. Hooper, the writer Deborah Moggach, and the producer Kate Harwood researched the period details of the production by interviewing Nancy's sister Deborah. In 2002, Hooper directed Daniel Deronda, adapted from George Eliot's novel. The Guardian's Mark Lawson said of Hooper's two costume dramas, "he brought verve and intelligence to television's most conservative form".

Hooper returned to Granada the next year to direct the revival of Prime Suspect, entitled The Last Witness. The two-part serial was the first Prime Suspect instalment to be made since 1995, when star Helen Mirren quit. Hooper initially declined to direct the production because he believed the series was tired. Granada's head of drama Andy Harries introduced Hooper to Mirren, who persuaded him to take the job by promising that he could make the serial his own way. The two-part serial was broadcast on the ITV network in November 2003. Hooper's direction received praise from Andrew Billen in the New Statesman: "Tom Hooper proved an outstanding director, imposing a bleak, overlit hyper-realism on the search for a killer in a hospital, isolating Mirren in rows of empty chairs and playing on the eyewitness/optical visual metaphors." The serial was also broadcast on PBS in the United States. Hooper received nominations for the British Academy Television Award for Best Drama Serial and the Primetime Emmy Award for Outstanding Directing for a Miniseries, Movie or Dramatic Special for his work on Prime Suspect.

=== 2004–2008: Film debut and HBO works ===
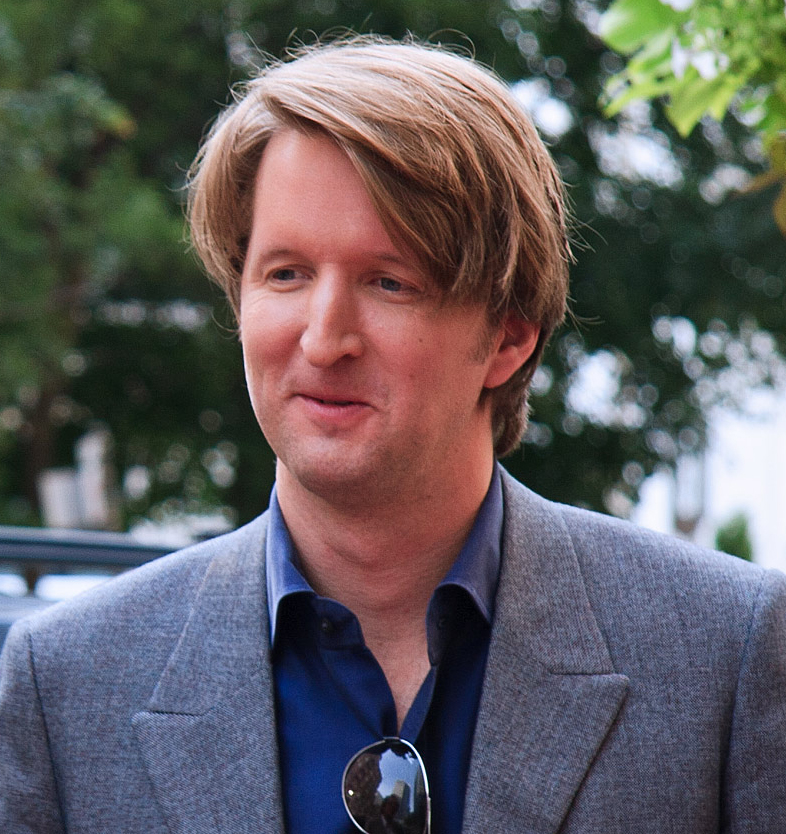
Hooper at the 2010 Toronto International Film Festival

Hooper made his debut as a feature film director with the South African Truth and Reconciliation Commission drama Red Dust (2004), which stars Hilary Swank, Chiwetel Ejiofor and Jamie Bartlett. The film was not widely seen, which Hooper attributed to media coverage of torture during the Iraq War: "When I started making it you could watch the movie with a wonderful sense of 'we'd never do it in our own country…they're the horrible people but it's not us.' By the time the film came out (there were) these revelations that the Americans were torturing, the British were torturing. The film became a lot more uncomfortable for the very audiences it was designed to target. I have learned that sadly the theatrical audience does not run to see films that are openly issue-led." The premiere of the film in the United Kingdom came on BBC Two in 2005, making it eligible for the BAFTA Television Awards; it was nominated in the Best Single Drama category at the 2006 ceremony.

In 2005, Hooper was asked by Helen Mirren to direct the Company Pictures/HBO Films two-part serial Elizabeth I, in which she was starring. The serial won Hooper his first Emmy Award, for Outstanding Directing for a Miniseries, Movie or Dramatic Special. In January 2006, Hooper commenced filming the Granada/HBO television film Longford. The film dramatises the failed efforts of Lord Longford (played by Jim Broadbent) to secure the release from prison of Moors murderer Myra Hindley (played by Samantha Morton). The film was broadcast on Channel 4 in October 2006. Seb Morton-Clark for the Financial Times called Longford one of the most accomplished television dramas of 2006, and praised the writer and director: "Morgan and director Tom Hooper wove a seamless narrative about obsession – and not just that of the misguided philanthropist for the incarcerated Hindley or even that that existed between the sadistic lovers themselves. More significantly, by using chunks of original television footage, they painted a stark picture of the zealotry of a vengeful nation and its press over the supposed embodiment of evil." Hooper's continued successes led him to be ranked at number four in the Directors category of Broadcast magazine's annual Hot 100. The following year he was nominated for the British Academy Television Craft Award for Best Director for Longford.

Elizabeth I and Longford led directly to Hooper being selected by Tom Hanks to direct the epic miniseries John Adams for Playtone and HBO. Hooper had been working on a biographical film with Joan Didion about Katharine Graham, publisher of The Washington Post, since 2006 when he was asked by Hanks to helm the programme. (Note: Hooper was subsequently replaced by Robert Benton on the Graham project.) The miniseries, starring Paul Giamatti as John Adams, was based on David McCullough's Adams biography and was Hooper's first wholly American production. He worked on the miniseries for a total of 16 months; principal photography lasted 110 days on locations in the United States, France, England and Hungary and he controlled a $100 million budget. The Boston Globe's Matthew Gilbert complimented Hooper's style of direction in the first two episodes "Join or Die" and "Independence":

Director Tom Hooper lets his actors shine, as he did so marvelously in Helen Mirren's Elizabeth I and the child-killer drama Longford, but he complements them, too, with this kind of immediate point of view. And when he does give us panoramic shots from afar – of the Adams farm in Braintree, for example – they're askew, to keep us out of the classroom mode. At the end of episode 2 [...] Hooper showcases all his directorial strength with one bold choice. When the long-fretting Congress finally decides to break with Britain, he refrains from using any visual or aural tweaks. Upon the announcement, "The resolution carries," the scene remains perfectly silent for one long moment. The terror of responsibility hangs heavily in the room, while a victorious soundtrack surely would have chased it away.

John Adams received 23 Emmy Award nominations, including another Outstanding Direction nomination for Hooper, and won 13, the highest number for any nominee in a single year. He was also nominated for the Directors Guild of America Award for Outstanding Directorial Achievement. At the beginning of 2009, he was profiled for The Observer's film Hotlist.

=== 2009–2010: Independent feature films ===
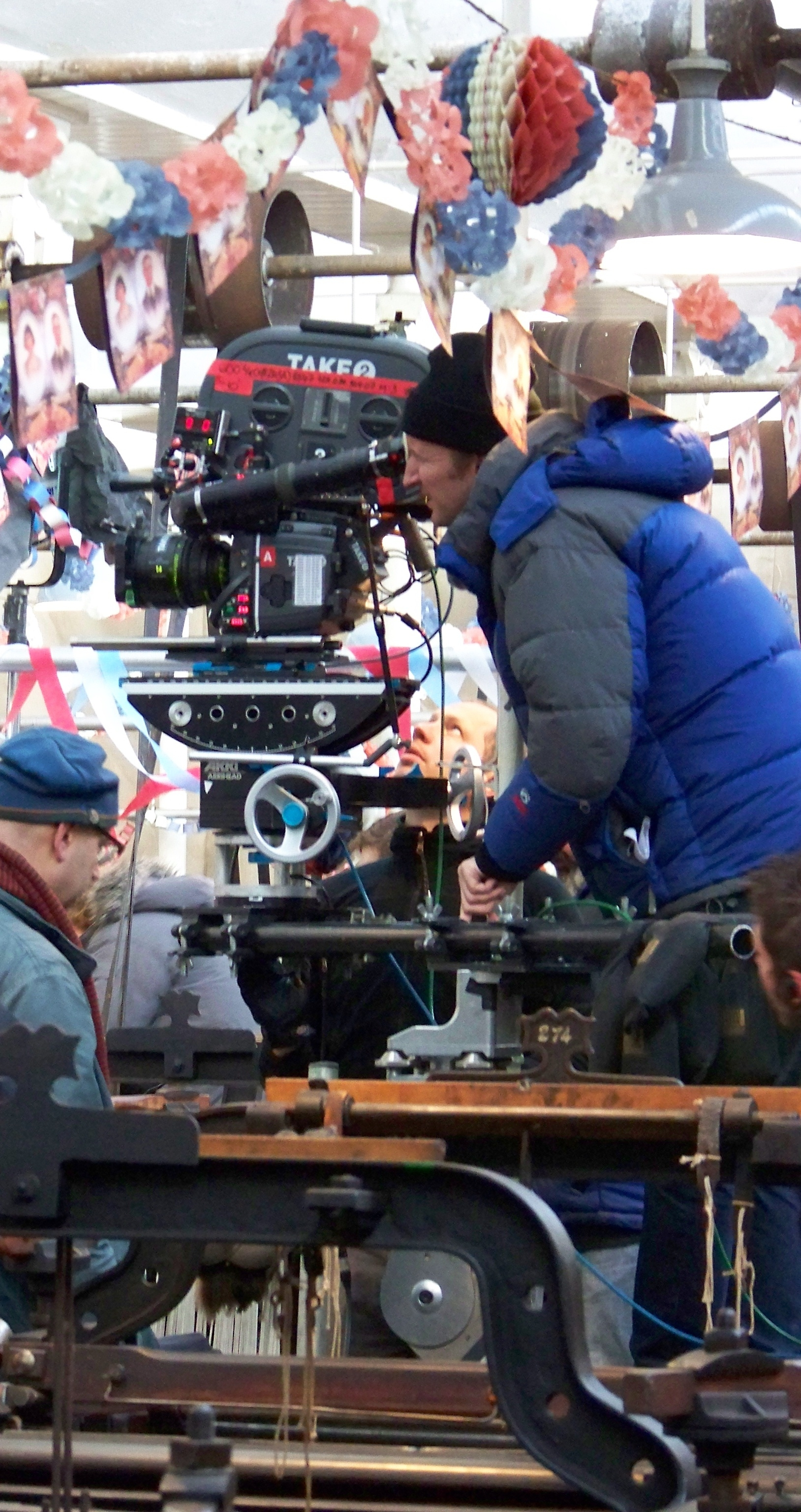
Hooper directing The King's Speech on location in 2010

The wake of John Adams' Emmy wins brought offers to Hooper from studios to direct spy and comic book films, which he declined. In November 2007, he signed on to direct The Damned United, reuniting him with Peter Morgan and Andy Harries. The film was an adaptation of David Peace's novel The Damned Utd, a fictional version of the 44 turbulent days English football manager Brian Clough spent as manager of Leeds United. It was originally developed by Stephen Frears for Michael Sheen to play Clough. Frears quit the project after he was unable to translate the book to film. Hooper received a copy of the script while shooting John Adams in Hungary and noticed a similarity between the "egotistical, flawed, brilliant" Adams and the "egotistical, flawed, brilliant" Clough. He was not put off by joining the project later, as Morgan's script was in only its first draft. During pre-production, Hooper engaged in meticulous research, particularly on the locations and the football grounds of the era. He cast Timothy Spall as Clough's assistant Peter Taylor, Colm Meaney as Don Revie and Jim Broadbent as Derby County chairman Sam Longson. During editing, it was decided to make the tone of the film lighter to attract audiences and to appease the real people depicted in the film. The Damned United was released in 2009.

Work on Hooper's next film, The King's Speech, began in the same year. Hooper explained: "It was a stage play, and my mother who's Australian was invited to a fringe [theatre] reading in London because she's part of the Australian community. The play's about the relationship between King George the Sixth and his Australian speech therapist. She came back and said 'you've got to read this play,' and I read it and it was brilliant ...". Hooper cast Colin Firth as George VI and Geoffrey Rush as Lionel Logue and spent three weeks with the actors reading the script and rehearsing. Principal photography took place on location around the UK from November 2009 to January 2010. During editing, Hooper continued to consult with Firth and Rush by sending them cuts of the film and listening to their feedback.

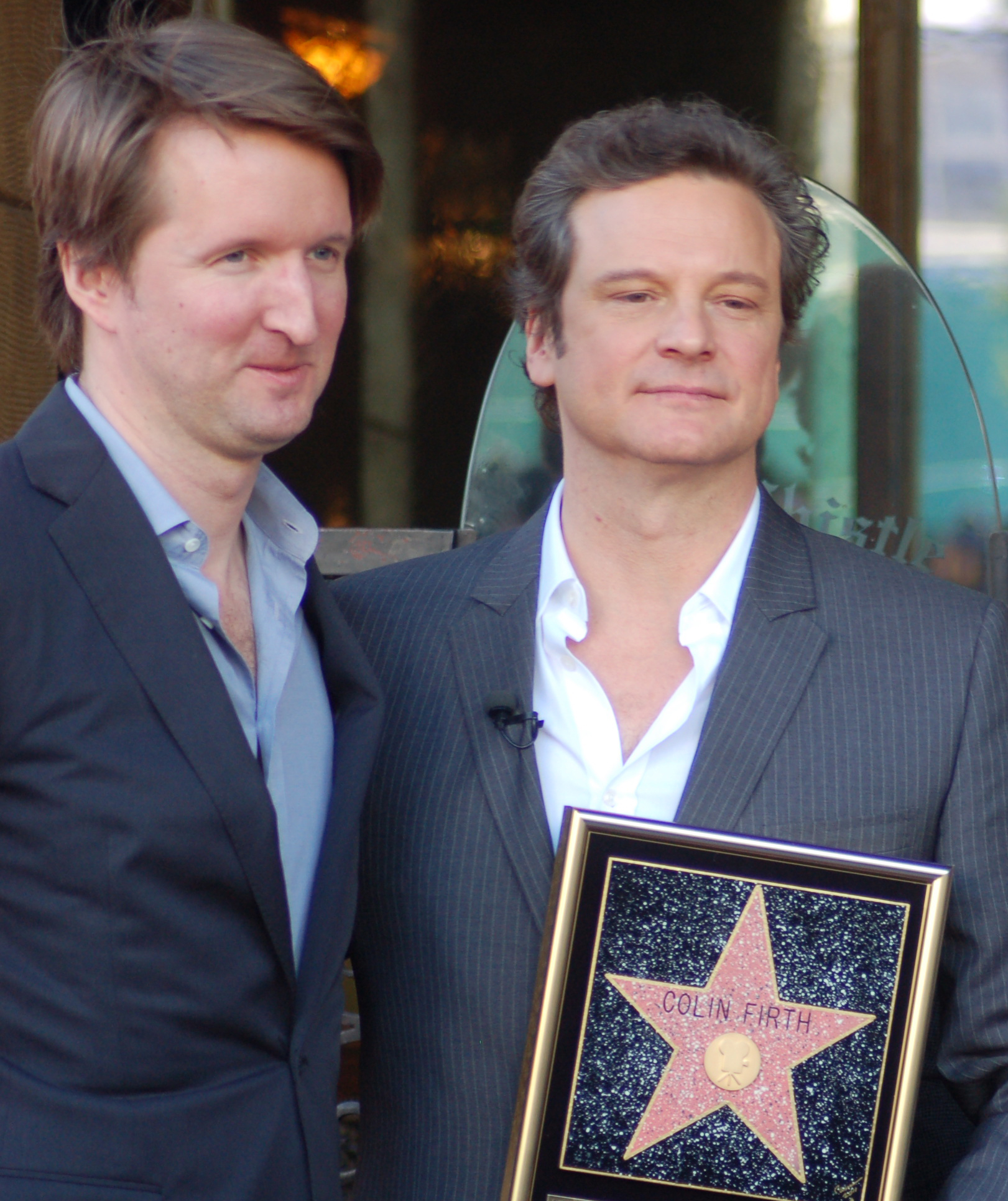
Hooper with Colin Firth in January 2011

Hooper completed the final cut of the film at the end of August 2010 and presented it a few days later at the Telluride Film Festival. The film won the People's Choice Award at the Toronto International Film Festival and Hooper won the Directors Guild of America Award for Outstanding Directorial Achievement in Motion Pictures. In February 2011, he was presented with the Academy Award for Best Director, though lost the BAFTA Award for Best Direction to David Fincher. In comparing the two films, Variety's Adam Dawtrey wrote, "Hooper's 2009 film The Damned United did not register among awards selectors, but King's Speech is a much more personal project. His Anglo-Australian parentage reflects the culture clash at the heart of the movie, and it pays off with beautifully crafted, crowd-pleasing drama."

=== 2011–present: Studio films ===
Following the success of The King's Speech during the awards season, Hooper joined the 15-person board of governors at the British Film Institute, was invited to join the directors branch of the Academy of Motion Picture Arts and Sciences, and was ranked at number 19 in The Times' British Film Power 100. In March 2009, Hooper met with Nelson Mandela in preparation for directing a film adaptation of Mandela's autobiography Long Walk to Freedom. By 2012, however, he had left the project.

He was offered the chance to direct Iron Man 3 for Marvel Studios but declined and instead signed on to direct Les Misérables for Working Title Films, which he had first heard about while discussing a different project with screenwriter William Nicholson in 2010. Hooper had not seen the musical, so watched a performance of it in London's West End. Adapted from the musical, the film starred Hugh Jackman, Russell Crowe, Anne Hathaway, Amanda Seyfried, Helena Bonham Carter, Sacha Baron Cohen, and Eddie Redmayne. As the film required the actors to sing and dance, they were auditioned in front of Hooper, producers and composers. The role of Fantine was hugely contested; Hooper said, "It was like half a dozen of the biggest female movie stars on the planet wanted to play the role".

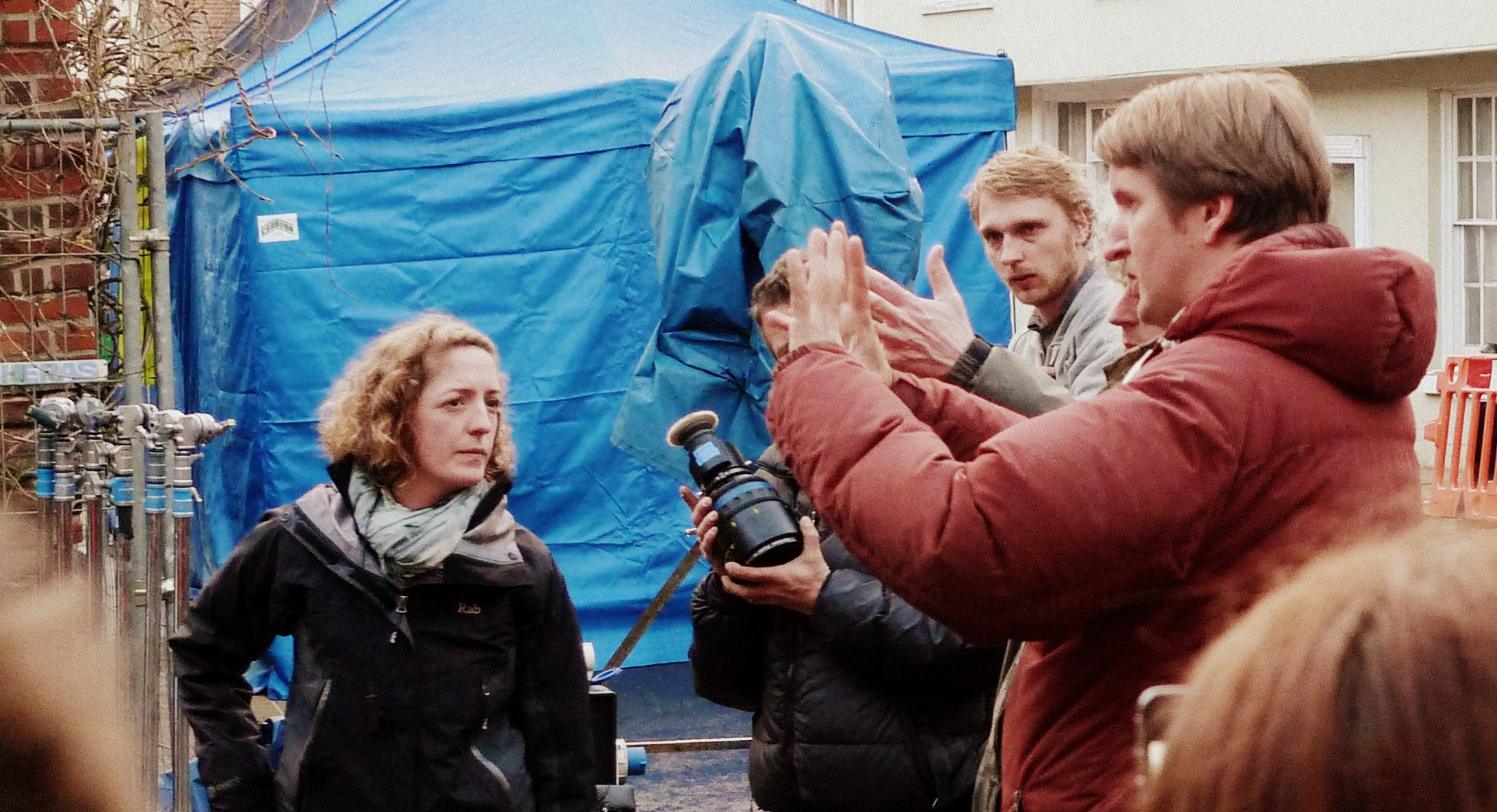
Hooper directing the second unit of Les Misérables on location in Winchester, April 2012

Hooper investigated filming the feature in 3D, and performed some camera tests before deciding to film it with traditional 2D methods. He stated "[...] I slightly worry with 3D that some people will physically struggle with it. If you have a certain type of eyesight, it can be more demanding than watching a normal movie." Unlike other musical films, Les Misérables features the actors singing live on camera, rather than miming to backing vocals. Hooper told Los Angeles Times that he thought there was a "slightly strange falseness" when he saw musical films where the actors sang to recordings. The actors wore wireless earpieces on set so they could sing to accompanying piano music. Hooper believed this method allowed the actors to have emotional control over their songs: "When Annie [Hathaway, who plays Fantine] is singing 'I Dreamed a Dream', if she needs to take a tenth of a second to have a thought before she sings it, or to have an emotion before she sings a line, she can take it."Les Miserables was released in North America on 25 December 2012, and received eight Academy Award nominations including Best Picture.

Hooper's fifth feature film, The Danish Girl, was released in late 2015. It loosely tells the story of Lili Elbe, one of the first people to undergo sex reassignment surgery, and wife Gerda Wegener. It stars Eddie Redmayne and Alicia Vikander, both of whom received Academy Award nominations, with the latter winning. Critics were generally positive about the film.

In May 2016, it was announced that he would direct an adaptation of Andrew Lloyd Webber's stage musical, Cats, which is in turn, based on T. S. Eliot's Old Possum's Book of Practical Cats. Filming commenced in November 2018 and the film, which stars Jennifer Hudson, Ian McKellen, Judi Dench, James Corden, Idris Elba and Taylor Swift, was released on 20 December 2019 but was a critical and commercial failure. Hooper co-produced the original song "Beautiful Ghosts" with Lloyd Webber and Greg Wells, written by Swift and Lloyd Webber.

In 2023, he co-supervised a new digital remix and remaster of Les Misérables in Dolby Vision and Dolby Atmos, in collaboration with producer Cameron Mackintosh, music producer Lee McCutcheon, music director Stephen Metcalfe and sound mixer Andy Nelson. This version of the film was released theatrically in Dolby Cinema on 14 February 2024 in the United Kingdom and 23 February 2024 in North America to celebrate the stage musical's upcoming 40th anniversary in 2025.

In February 2024, Hooper revealed that some upcoming projects with him set to direct are in the works, following a five-year hiatus from the medium caused by the critical and financial failure of Cats and spending time directing commercials for clients such as Vodafone, McDonald's, Santander and Vanish, saying, "I'm certainly quite close on a couple of things ... I've been busy. I'm very happy to get back behind the camera."

== Directorial style ==
Hooper adopted a style of framing actors at the extreme edge of a scene in both The Damned United (top) and The King's Speech (bottom)

Hooper uses camera styles "that encode the DNA of the storytelling in some way" and will reuse and develop filming styles in successive productions. Hooper identifies research as being key to his process of directing period dramas such as John Adams to make the scenes authentic. For The Damned United, Hooper and director of photography Ben Smithard researched the look of the late 1960s and early 1970s through football photography books. Hooper has also been influenced by cinematographer Larry Smith, who worked with Stanley Kubrick and advised Hooper of techniques used by Kubrick. Hooper and Smith have worked together on Cold Feet, Love in a Cold Climate, Prime Suspect, Red Dust and Elizabeth I.

Hooper also uses uncommon framing techniques to emphasise story; in John Adams, he wanted to imply American independence seemed unlikely during the Revolutionary War, so he used "a very rough camera style—almost all hand held, wide lenses close to the actors, lots of movement, many cameras shooting at once so there was often not a settled master "point of view", and lots of unmatching Dutch tilts so the horizon lines of the frame were often being thrown off." The America-set scenes were contrasted by the scenes set in France, in which more traditional filming techniques were employed to evoke a feel of entrenched values. Similarly, in The Damned United, Hooper began to experiment with using wide-angle lenses and putting actors in the extreme edges of the frame. He was influenced by the unusual framing from social photography of the 1970s, and he and Ben Smithard decided to adopt the framing style while scouting locations. Hooper used the same style in The King's Speech, particularly in the scene where Bertie and Logue meet in Logue's consulting room; Colin Firth is framed to the extreme left of the picture, leaving most of the shot dominated by the rough wall behind Firth.

Hooper frequently uses Dutch tilts in his work, notably in John Adams (top) and Les Misérables (bottom)

Another frequently used technique is Hooper's tendency to use a variety of focal length camera lenses to distort the resulting picture. In The Damned United he used a 10mm lens, notably in the scene where Clough stays inside during the Derby–Leeds match. Hooper operated the camera in this scene himself. In The King's Speech, Hooper used "typically 14mm, 18mm, 21mm, 25mm and 27mm" lenses and put the camera close to the actors' faces. Hooper said the use of this method in the first consulting room scene served to "suggest the awkwardness and tension of Logue and Bertie's first meeting".

=== Cats VFX accusations ===
Following the release of Cats, reports came from the film's visual effects departments of Hooper's "hurtful", "horrible", "disrespectful" and "demeaning attitude" towards them and their work. The VFX team reportedly were forced to work upwards of 90-hour working weeks, with some employees staying at the offices for two to three days at a time just to finish the film. One member of the VFX team said Hooper's treatment "was pure, almost slavery for us", with six months to complete the trailer, and only four months to complete the film. Hooper supposedly had little understanding of the process of visual effects, thus the VFX department could not show Hooper the step-by-step process of what he wanted, such as animatics, unless it was already rendered. He reportedly would send emails to individual VFX artists on the film to denigrate their work. Hooper would also insult them during conference meetings, calling the work "garbage". Neither Hooper nor Universal have commented on the accusations.

== Filmography ==
=== Film ===
Year	Title	Director	Producer	Writer	Distribution
2004	Red Dust	Yes	No	No	BBC Films
2009	The Damned United	Yes	No	No	Sony Pictures Classics
2010	The King's Speech	Yes	No	No	The Weinstein Company
2012	Les Misérables	Yes	No	No	Universal Pictures
2015	The Danish Girl	Yes	Yes	No	Focus Features
2019	Cats	Yes	Yes	Yes	Universal Pictures

=== Television ===
Year	Title	Network	Notes
1997	Quayside	ITV Tyne Tees	
1997	Byker Grove	BBC One	4 episodes
1998–2000	EastEnders	BBC One	6 episodes
1999	Cold Feet	ITV	2 episodes
2001	Love in a Cold Climate	BBC1	Miniseries
2002	Daniel Deronda	BBC1	Miniseries
2003	Prime Suspect 6: The Last Witness	ITV	Miniseries
2005	Elizabeth I	HBO	Miniseries
2006	Longford	HBO	Television film
2008	John Adams	HBO	Miniseries
2019	His Dark Materials	BBC Studios/HBO	2 episodes; Also executive producer

== Awards and nominations ==
Year	Title	Academy Awards		BAFTA Awards		Golden Globe Awards	
Year	Title	Nominations	Wins	Nominations	Wins	Nominations	Wins
2010	The King's Speech	12	4	14	7	7	1
2012	Les Misérables	8	3	9	4	4	3
2015	The Danish Girl	4	1	5		3	
2019	Cats					1	
Total		24	8	28	11	15	4

Hooper with Kathryn Bigelow, who won the previous year's Oscar for Best Director

Directed Academy Award performances
Under Hooper's direction, these actors have received Academy Award wins and nominations for their performances in their respective roles.

Year	Performer	Title	Result
Academy Award for Best Actor
2010	Colin Firth	The King's Speech	Won
2012	Hugh Jackman	Les Misérables	Nominated
2015	Eddie Redmayne	The Danish Girl	Nominated
Academy Award for Best Supporting Actor
2010	Geoffrey Rush	The King's Speech	Nominated
Academy Award for Best Supporting Actress
2010	Helena Bonham Carter	The King's Speech	Nominated
2012	Anne Hathaway	Les Misérables	Won
2015	Alicia Vikander	The Danish Girl	Won

== See also ==
- List of Academy Award winners and nominees from Great Britain
- List of directorial debuts
- List of EastEnders crew members
- List of University of Oxford people
