= Dave Mackay =

Scottish football player and manager (1934–2015)

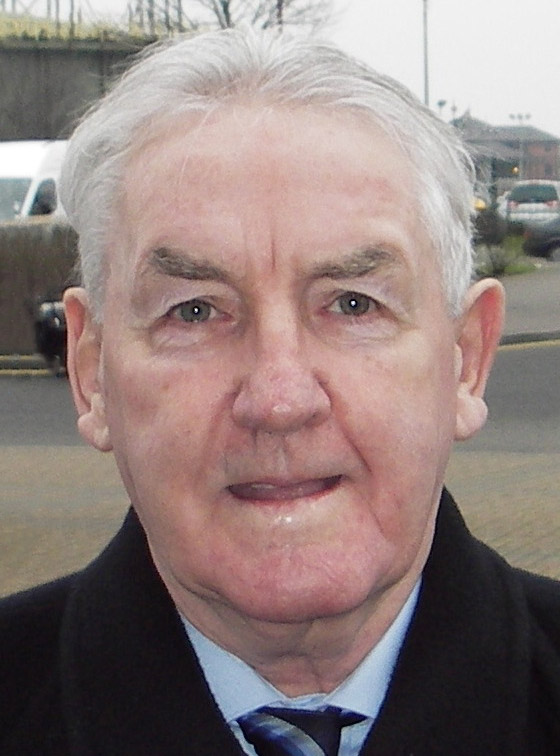
- Mackay in 2006

Personal information
- Full name: David Craig Mackay
- Date of birth: 14 November 1934
- Place of birth: Edinburgh, Scotland
- Date of death: 2 March 2015 (aged 80)
- Place of death: Nottingham, England
- Height: 5 ft 8 in (1.73 m)
- Positions: Left-half; sweeper

Senior career*
Years	Team	Apps	(Gls)
1953–1959	Heart of Midlothian	135	(25)
1959–1968	Tottenham Hotspur	268	(42)
1968–1971	Derby County	122	(5)
1971–1972	Swindon Town	26	(1)
Total		601	(82)

International career
1954–1958	Scotland U23	4	(1)
1957–1965	Scotland	22	(4)
1957–1958	Scottish League XI	3	(0)
1958	SFL trial v SFA	1	(0)
1959–1962	SFA trial v SFL	3	(2)

Managerial career
- 1971–1972: Swindon Town
- 1972–1973: Nottingham Forest
- 1973–1976: Derby County
- 1977–1978: Walsall
- 1978–1986: Al-Arabi Kuwait
- 1983: Al-Shabab
- 1987: Al-Arabi Kuwait
- 1987–1989: Doncaster Rovers
- 1989–1991: Birmingham City
- 1991–1993: Zamalek
- 1994–1995: Qatar
- * Club domestic league appearances and goals

David Craig Mackay (14 November 1934 – 2 March 2015) was a Scottish football player and manager. Mackay was best known for a highly successful playing career with Heart of Midlothian, the double-winning Tottenham Hotspur side of 1961 and winning the league with Derby County as a manager. He also represented Scotland 22 times and was selected for their 1958 FIFA World Cup squad. Mackay tied with Tony Book of Manchester City for the Footballer of the Year award in 1969 and was later listed by the Football League in their "100 Legends", as well as being an inaugural inductee to both the English and Scottish Football Halls of Fame. He was described by Spurs as one of their greatest players and was known as 'the heartbeat' of their most successful ever team.

== Early life ==
Mackay was born in Edinburgh. His father was a printer who worked for The Scotsman newspaper. As a young footballer, he was a Scottish Schoolboy international.

== Club career ==
=== Heart of Midlothian ===
Mackay supported Hearts as a boy. He signed as a professional in 1952, initially on a part-time basis as he also worked as joiner. Mackay was given his first team debut in November 1953. He would be paired with John Cumming at wing half, which was to become the core of the team. Mackay was a talented all-round player; a strong tackler, physically fit and had good technique with the ball. Cumming's Iron Man nickname says much of his determination. Despite his commitment he retained control of his temper and was never booked in his career. Cumming was the only player to collect medals for all seven of the trophies Hearts won under manager Tommy Walker. "He never had a bad game. It was either a fairly good game or an excellent game," said Mackay later of his former teammate. Both went on to become full Scotland internationals while playing for Hearts.

Mackay was given a regular place in the team in the 1954–55 season, with Freddie Glidden now playing at centre-half. Hearts won their first trophy since 1906, 48 years before, as they beat Motherwell 4–2 in the 1954 Scottish League Cup Final. This would be the first of seven trophies over nine seasons between 1954 and 1963. After signing Alex Young and Bobby Kirk, Walker's side proceeded to win the 1955–56 Scottish Cup. They thrashed Rangers 4–0 in the quarter-finals with goals from Crawford, Conn and a Bauld double.

Mackay completed the set of Scottish domestic honours by winning the league championship in 1957–58. Jimmy Wardhaugh was the league's top goalscorer with 28, while Jimmy Murray and Alex Young also scored more than 20. Mackay was fourth in Hearts' league scoring charts, with 12. Hearts won that League title in 1957–58 with record-breaking points, goals scored and goal difference totals. Their record from 34 league games of 62 points out of a maximum possible 68 was 13 more than their nearest rival. They scored 132 goals (still the Scottish top tier record) with only 29 against for a record net difference of +103. Murray and Mackay both played for Scotland at the 1958 FIFA World Cup, where Murray scored in a 1–1 draw against Yugoslavia. Mackay played in only the third of Scotland's three games at the World Cup.

In the 1958–59 Scottish League Cup group stage Hearts eliminated Rangers. That October 1958 Scottish League Cup Final was won with a heavy 5–1 defeat of Partick Thistle. Bauld and Murray each scored two and Johnny Hamilton netted one. This was the fourth and last Hearts trophy for Mackay.

He had some injury issues in what was to be his last year at Hearts. From late March he missed the last five games of the 1957–58 successful league run in. He then missed the first five Hearts games at the start of the 1958–59 season, returning at the end of August. After 6 December he was then eight weeks out the team with the 13 December 1959 crucial 5–0 defeat away to Rangers the first game he missed before returning on 4 February for the 3–1 Scottish Cup victory away at Queen of the South. Just over a month after he regained his place in the first team, Mackay again played Queen of the South this time in a 2–1 home league win on 7 March 1959. The league game against QoS was Mackay's last for Hearts after they accepted a bid of £32,000 from Tottenham Hotspur for their captain. In Hearts' next game Mackay's vacated half back berth was taken by George Thomson, who moved from inside forward. Thomson's inside forward spot was given to debutant Bobby Rankin, who had been signed for £4,000 from Queen of the South two days before Mackay's last Hearts game. Hearts spent £23,000 of the transfer on stadium improvements.

=== Tottenham Hotspur ===
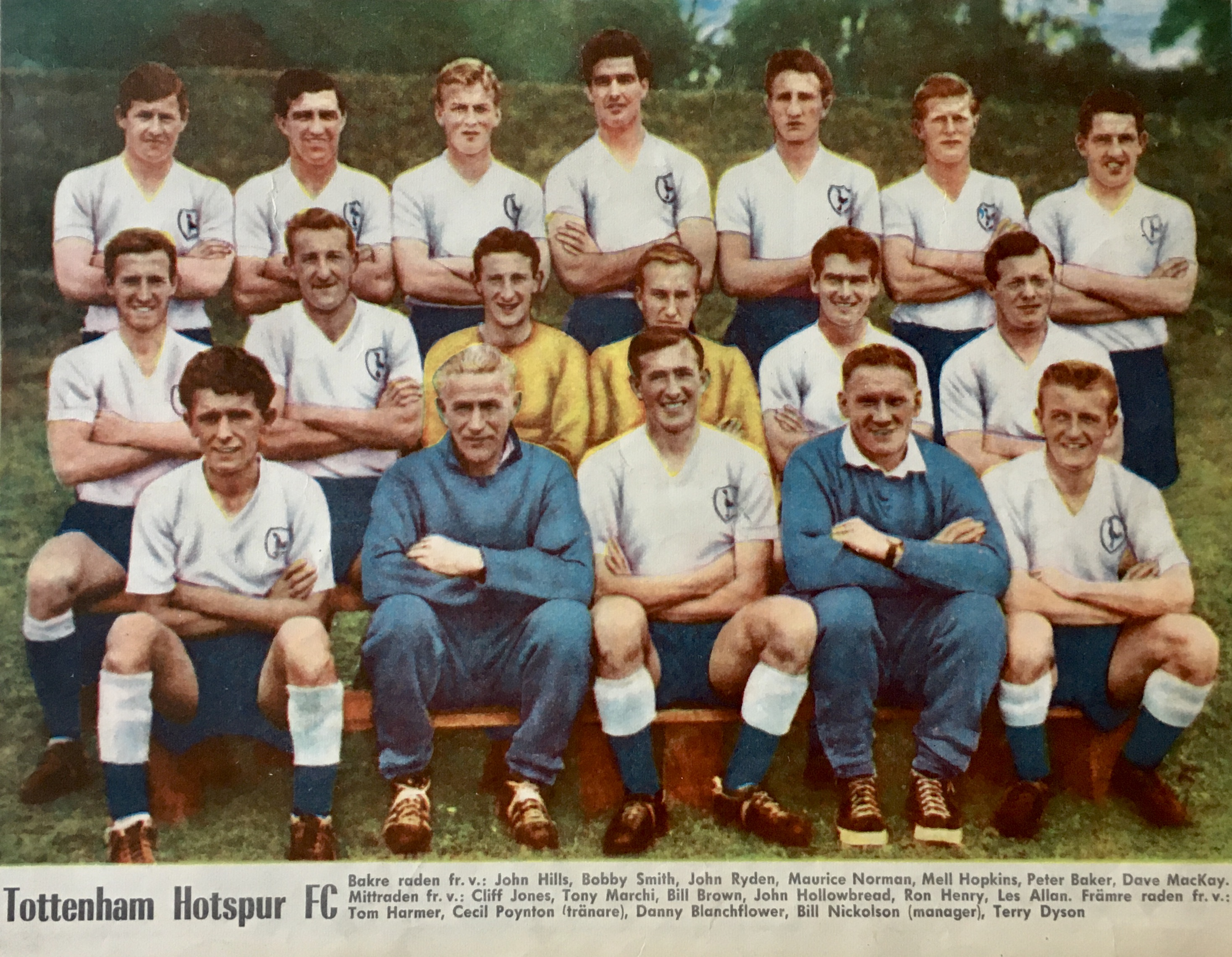
Tottenham Hotspur in 1960 with Danny Blanchflower (captain) and both goalkeepers, Bill Brown and John Hollowbread, in the team with Cecil Poynton as trainer and Bill Nicholson as manager. Dave Mackay is standing far right.

Aged 24, he was signed by Tottenham Hotspur for £32,000 in March 1959 making his debut on 21 March in a 3–1 home win against Manchester City. During the 1960s his fierce determination and skill contributed to the team which won the Double in 1960–61. As double winners Spurs played in the 1961 FA Charity Shield against an FA XI which Spurs won 3–2. In that 1961 FA Cup Final they beat Leicester City 2–0. They retained the trophy when they won the 1962 FA Cup Final beating Burnley 3–1. This put them into a second successive Charity Shield. In that 1962 FA Charity Shield they beat Ipswich Town 5–1. This put Spurs into the 1962–63 Cup Winners' Cup. However Mackay missed the 5–1 1963 European Cup Winners' Cup Final victory over the defending champions Atlético Madrid at De Kuip in Rotterdam due to injured stomach muscles. Mackay had scored in the semi-final victory against OFK Beograd.

Spurs defended the Cup Winners' Cup the season after and were drawn to play the then FA Cup-holders, Manchester United, in the second round. Mackay scored the opener in the first leg 2–0 victory at White Hart Lane. On 10 December 1963 Mackay broke his left leg in a challenge with United's Noel Cantwell after eight minutes of the return tie at Old Trafford. Without him his teammates lost 4–1 due to a double strike by Bobby Charlton in the last 13 minutes. Mackay had just turned 29 the month before. The break was a serious one, and it took nine months before he attempted a comeback. Playing for Tottenham's reserves at home to Shrewsbury Town on 12 September 1964, he broke the same bone a second time, this time in a challenge with Peter Dolby. Mackay returned at the start of the 1965–66 season having missed a year and a half of first-team football.

In 1966 Mackay was photographed by Daily Mirror photographer Monte Fresco in an on-pitch confrontation with Leeds United's Billy Bremner. Mackay's face contorted, he is seen grabbing Bremner's shirt. The image is seen as one of the most iconic in UK football although Mackay hated it as it portrayed him as a bully. Mackay stated he reacted in the manner he did since Bremner targeted Mackay's left leg (the one he had broken twice) even though this leg was furthest away from Bremner.

Tottenham won the 1967 FA Cup Final beating Chelsea 2–1 for a third success in that tournament with Mackay. In the subsequent Charity Shield, Spurs drew 3–3 with Manchester United in a match remembered for goalkeeper Pat Jennings scoring with a kick from his own penalty area.

Mackay made 268 league appearances for Tottenham. With Mackay Spurs won one league championship, three FA Cups, one European Cup Winners' Cup and two FA Charity Shields as well as the 1967 Charity Shield that they shared because of the draw. None of these trophies were won in the two seasons affected by Mackay's lengthy injury due to his leg break. Brian Clough claimed in 2003 that Mackay was Tottenham Hotspur's greatest ever player.

=== Derby County ===
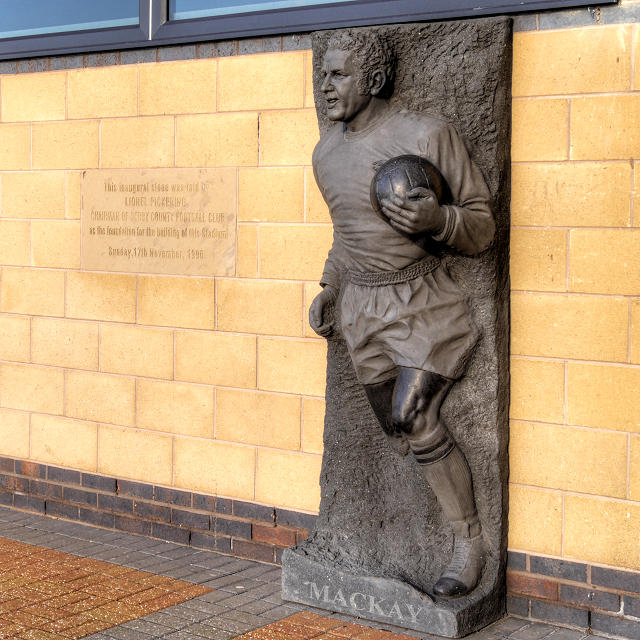
Dave Mackay Memorial, Derby County FC, unveiled in 2015

Aged 33, at the start of the 1968–69 season he transferred to Derby County for £5,000. Brian Clough and Peter Taylor persuaded him to sign. In his first season at the Baseball Ground, in which the club gained promotion to the First Division, he was chosen FWA Footballer of the Year, jointly with Manchester City's Tony Book. When he was a player at Derby County, Clough made Mackay play in a sweeping role and used his influence on the team to encourage them to turn defence into attack through a passing game. He left Derby in 1971, a year before they won the First Division title.

=== Swindon Town ===
Aged 36, he joined Swindon Town in 1971 as player/manager where he stayed one season before he retired as a player and focused solely on management.

== International career ==
Aged 22, Mackay made his debut for Scotland on 26 May 1957 in a qualifying game for the 1958 World Cup, against Spain at the Bernabéu Stadium in Madrid. Scotland qualified for the tournament in Sweden, with Mackay playing a single game, on 15 June 1958, against France; a 2–1 defeat at the Eyravallen Stadium in Örebro. He first captained his country in his third international, on 18 October 1958, in a 3–0 away win against Wales in the British Home Championships. The first four of his full caps were when he was with Hearts. The remainder were when he was with Tottenham. The first of his four international goals was in a friendly game at the Prater Stadium in Vienna on 29 May 1960 in a 3–1 away defeat to Austria.

His 15th cap was the disastrous 9–3 defeat at Wembley to England in April 1961;. Mackay then spent two years out of the side, with Jim Baxter and Paddy Crerand usually being the preferred half back pairing. Mackay was recalled two years later in April 1963, again versus England at Wembley, but this time Scotland won 2–1. In his two years out the team Mackay missed the entire qualification campaign for the 1962 FIFA World Cup (Scotland were eliminated in a play off by the eventual tournament runners-up, Czechoslovakia). Mackay had been incumbent in the half back line for three straight games leading up to the game for Spurs in December 1963 in which he broke his leg.

He made 22 national appearances, his last coming on 2 October 1965, again in the British Home Championships, a 3–2 away defeat to Northern Ireland. His last cap was the only one he collected after the leg break.

== Managerial career ==
In 1971 Mackay was appointed player-manager of Swindon Town but left after just one season to take charge of Nottingham Forest. He remained at the City Ground until October 1973, when he returned to Derby as manager following Clough's resignation. In his first season Derby finished third in the table. In his second season in charge of Derby, he guided the team to the 1974–75 league title. The following season, he managed the club to a respectable fourth-place finish in the league, the semi-finals of the FA Cup, and a second-round exit to Real Madrid in the 1975–76 European Cup. Having beaten them 4–1 in the first leg, a weakened Derby side were beaten 5–1 in the return leg. At one stage the side had been in the running for the Double. Mackay was sacked in November 1976 after a poor start to the 1976–77 season.

Mackay then had a spell as Walsall manager from March 1977 to August 1978. This was followed by nine years coaching in Kuwait. He returned to the UK and was appointed manager of Doncaster Rovers in 1987, a year after being linked with the Scotland manager's job (which ultimately went to Andy Roxburgh). Mackay's reign at Belle Vue lasted until March 1989 before he moved to Birmingham City, who had just been relegated to the third tier of the league for the first time in their history. His task was simple – to get Birmingham promoted to the Second Division. But he was unsuccessful in trying to achieve this and resigned in 1991. After that, Mackay headed to Africa to manage Egyptian club Zamalek SC, a Cairo based football team, with which he won the Egyptian Premier League two times, in both the seasons he was manager. He then spent a further three years in Qatar, managing the Qatar national football team, before retiring from football altogether in 1997.

== Legacy ==
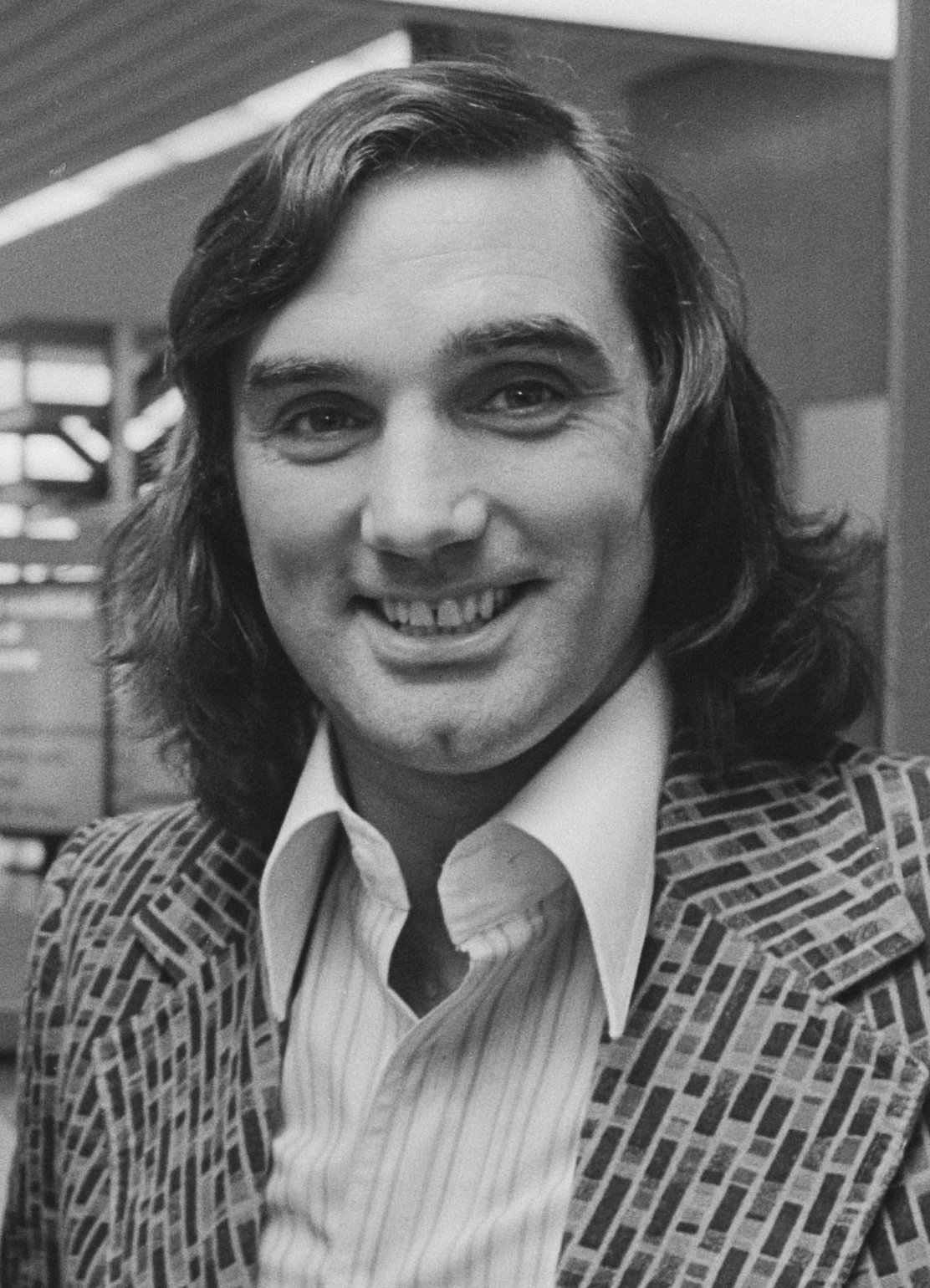
George Best (pictured) praised Mackay as both the hardest and bravest opponent he ever faced

In 2004 The Real Mackay was published, an autobiography written with Martin Knight. Mackay had previously published Soccer My Spur in the early 1960s.

Mackay was made an inaugural inductee of the English Football Hall of Fame in 2002 in recognition of his impact on the English game as both a player and manager, Two years later, he was an inaugural inductee of the Scottish Football Hall of Fame. In 2006, he also became an inaugural inductee of the Heart of Midlothian Hall of Fame in recognition of his success as a player in the 1950s. In 2013, Mackay was one of eleven British football stars chosen by Royal Mail to feature on a set of stamps marking the 150th anniversary of The Football Association.

Mackay appears as a character in David Peace's novel The Damned Utd, a fictionalised account of Brian Clough's time as manager of Derby County and Leeds United. In the film adaptation of the book, The Damned United, Mackay is played by Brian McCardie. Mackay successfully took legal action against the makers of the film over its inaccurate portrayal of the events surrounding Clough's departure from Derby and Mackay's appointment.

George Best, of Manchester United, one of Tottenham's fiercest rivals in the 1960s, described Mackay as "the hardest man I have ever played against – and certainly the bravest".

Mackay died on 2 March 2015 at the age of 80. Heart of Midlothian stated "It is with deep regret that we have to advise of the death of Dave Mackay who was possibly the most complete midfield player that Scotland has ever produced". Tottenham wrote in an obituary "Dave Mackay will certainly always be remembered here as one of our greatest ever players and a man who never failed to inspire those around him. In short, a Spurs legend". His coffin was brought into his funeral by John Robertson and Gordon Marshall (ex-Hearts), Pat Jennings and Cliff Jones (ex-Tottenham) and Roy McFarland and John McGovern (ex-Derby). A eulogy was given by Alex Ferguson.

After his sacking at Derby County there was a cutting in Norman Stanley Fletcher's cell Mackay Sacked in Porridge which was a joke to Mr. Mackay.

== Career statistics ==
Appearances and goals by national team and year
National team	Year	Apps	Goals
Scotland	1957	1	0
Scotland	1958	3	0
Scotland	1959	4	0
Scotland	1960	6	1
Scotland	1961	1	1
Scotland	1963	6	2
Scotland	1965	1	0
Total		22	4

Scores and results list Scotland's goal tally first, score column indicates score after each Mackay goal.

List of international goals scored by Dave Mackay
No.	Date	Venue	Opponent	Score	Result	Competition
1	29 May 1960	Prater Stadium, Vienna, Austria	{Austria	1–4	1–4	Friendly
2	{15 April 1961	Wembley Stadium, London, England	{England	1–3	3–9	1960–61 British Home Championship
3	{7 November 1963	Hampden Park, Glasgow, Scotland	{Norway	4–1	6–1	Friendly
4	{7 November 1963	Hampden Park, Glasgow, Scotland	{Norway	5–1	6–1	Friendly

== Managerial record ==
Managerial record by team and tenure
Team	From	To	Record				
Team	From	To	P	W	D	L	Win %
Swindon Town	1 November 1971 (Note: Mackay signed for Swindon in May 1971 as player-manager, but he would not manage while Fred Ford was still under contract. When Ford was sacked in November 1971, Mackay took over.)	1 November 1972	45	14	13	18	31.1
Nottingham Forest	2 November 1972	23 October 1973	44	12	15	17	27.3
Derby County	23 October 1973	25 November 1976	165	74	47	44	44.8
Walsall	9 March 1977	5 August 1978	72	30	27	15	41.7
Doncaster Rovers	7 December 1987	17 March 1989	67	15	16	36	22.4
Birmingham City	26 April 1989	23 January 1991	91	34	27	30	37.4
Total			484	179	145	160	37.0

== Honours ==
=== Player ===
Heart of Midlothian

- Scottish League Division One: 1957–58
- Scottish Cup: 1955–56
- Scottish League Cup: 1954–55, 1958–59

Tottenham Hotspur

- Football League First Division: 1960–61
- FA Cup: 1960–61, 1961–62, 1966–67
- FA Charity Shield: 1961, 1962, 1967 (shared)
- European Cup Winner's Cup: 1962–63

Derby County

- Football League Second Division: 1968–69
- Watney Cup: 1970

Scotland national team

- British Home Championship: 1962–63, 1963–64 (shared)

=== Manager ===
Derby County

- Football League First Division: 1974–75
- FA Charity Shield: 1975

Zamalek

- Egyptian Premier League: 1991–92, 1992–93

Al-Arabi

- Kuwait League: 1979–80, 1981–82, 1982–83, 1983–84, 1984–85
- Kuwait Emir Cup: 1980–81, 1982–83
- Kuwait FA Cup: 1978–79
- GulfCup Clubs: 1983
- Kuwait Joint League: 1984–85

== See also ==
- List of English football championship winning managers
