= Richard Hooper =

Richard Hooper may refer to:

- Richard Hooper (MP), Member of Parliament (MP) for Plymouth
- Richard Hooper (Australian politician) (1846–1909), South Australian state MP
- Richard Hooper (civil servant), former UK civil servant
- Richard Hooper (umpire) (born 1976), New Zealand cricket umpire
- Dick Hooper (born 1956), Irish former long-distance runner
