= Red or Dead (novel) =

2013 novel by David Peace

- Hardcover edition
- Author: David Peace
- Language: English
- Publisher: Faber and Faber
- Publication date: 1 August 2013
- Publication place: United Kingdom
- Media type: Print (hardback)
- Pages: 736
- ISBN: 978-0-571-28065-0
- OCLC: 841184177

Red or Dead is a novel by British author David Peace. It details Bill Shankly's period as manager of Liverpool football club from his appointment in 1959 to his unexpected resignation in 1974.

The novel was shortlisted for the inaugural Goldsmiths Prize (2013).

== Stage adaptation ==
The novel was adapted for the stage by Phillip Breen, and premiered at the Royal Court Theatre, Liverpool in March 2025, starring Peter Mullan as Shankly.
