= GB84 =

Novel by David Peace about the 1984 UK miners' strike

- Author: David Peace
- Language: English
- Publisher: Faber & Faber
- Publication date: 2004
- Publication place: United Kingdom
- Media type: Print (Hardcover)
- ISBN: 9780571314874

GB84 is a 2004 novel by David Peace, set in the United Kingdom during the 1984-85 miners' strike.

== Plot ==
The novel is largely based on factual events and follows two main characters: Terry Winters (based on Roger Windsor), chief executive of the National Union of Mineworkers; and Stephen Sweet (based on David Hart), an advisor to the Thatcher government.

The novel refers to contemporary events including the murder of Hilda Murrell, the Battle of Orgreave, the involvement of the police and MI5, and the NUM's links with the Soviet Union and Libya.

== Structure and style ==
Each chapter begins with "day by day" accounts from two striking miners, Martin and Peter, written in short conversational sentences. The rest of each chapter is written in a more standard style.

== Reception ==
The book was awarded the James Tait Black Memorial Prize for literature in 2005.
