= Meredith Hooper =

Australian historian and writer (1939–2025)

- Born: Meredith Jean Rooney; 21 October 1939; Adelaide, Australia
- Died: 27 December 2025 (aged 86)
- Education: University of Adelaide, University of Oxford
- Occupation: Writer
- Spouse: Richard Hooper
- Children: Tom Hooper
- Writing career
- Language: English
- Genres: History, science writing, children's books
- Subject: Antarctica

Meredith Jean Hooper (née Rooney; 21 October 1939 – 27 December 2025) was an Australian historian and writer.

== Early life and education ==
Meredith Jean Rooney was born and raised in Adelaide, Australia. Hooper graduated in history from the University of Adelaide, then studied imperial history at Oxford.

== Career ==
Hooper was a member of Association of British Science Writers and the British Society for the History of Science, and was a visiting research fellow at the Royal Institution.

In 2000, the National Science Foundation and the Congress of the United States awarded Hooper the Antarctica Service Medal. In 2014, Hooper was named the Australian of the Year in the UK.

== Personal life and death ==
Meredith Hooper was the wife of British civil servant Richard Hooper and mother of film director Tom Hooper. After seeing a 2007 reading of an unproduced play, she told her son she thought he should consider pursuing it for a film adaptation; the project became his Academy Award-winning film, The King's Speech.

Hooper died on 27 December 2025, at the age of 86. She was buried at Highgate Cemetery.

=== Bibliography ===
- The Longest Winter: Scott's Other Heroes
- Celebrity Cat: With Paintings from Art Galleries Around the World
- The Pebble in my Pocket: A History of Our Earth
- The Endurance: Shackleton's Perilous Expedition in Antarctica
- The Ferocious Summer: Adelie Penguins and the Warming of Antarctica
- Stranded in the Winter: The Story of Scott’s Northern Party
