= List of awards and nominations received by Tom Hooper =

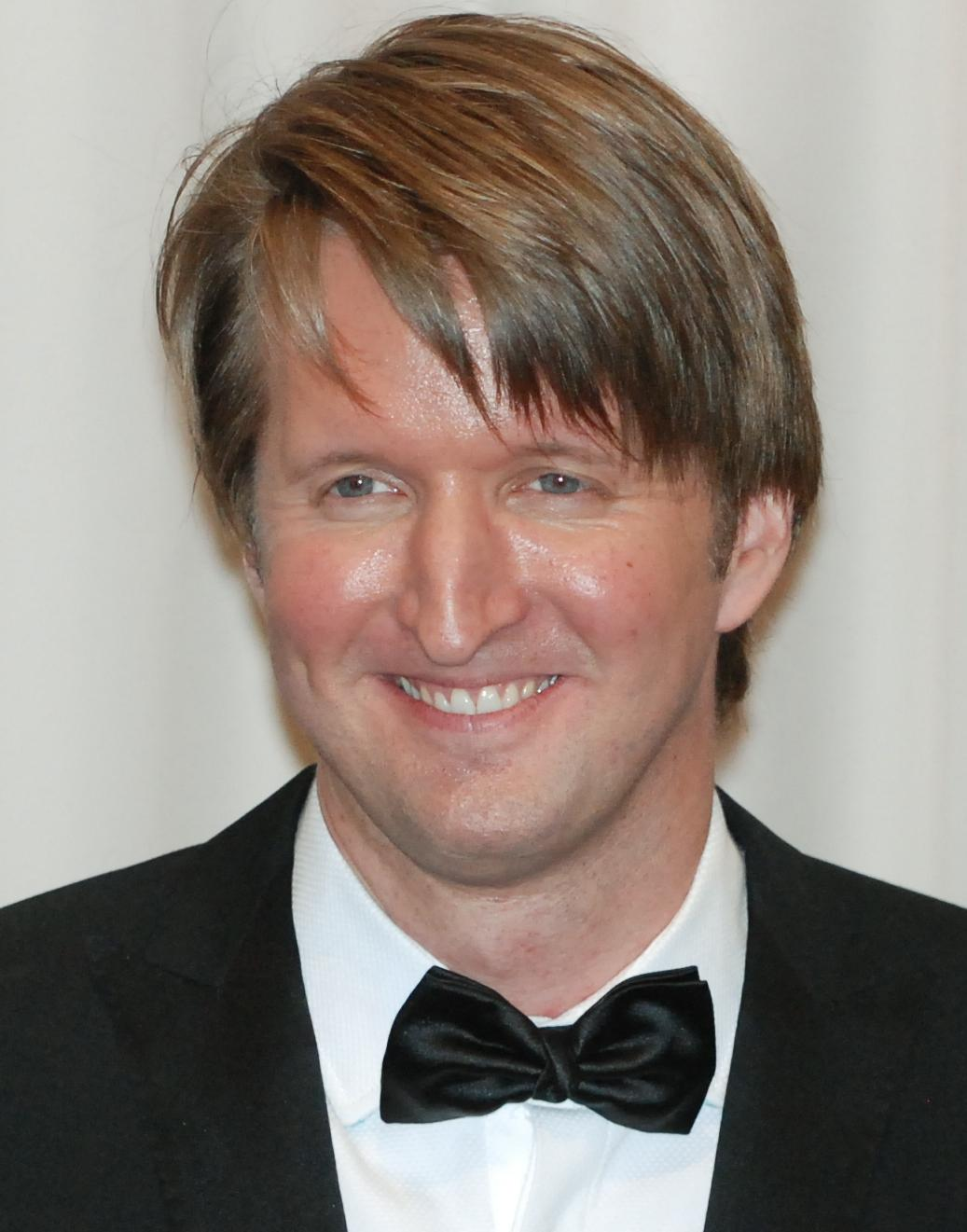
Tom Hooper in 2011

This article is a List of awards and nominations received by Tom Hooper

Tom Hooper is a British-Australian director known for his work in film and television. Over his career he has received an Academy Award, a BAFTA Award, a Primetime Emmy Award, and nomination for a Golden Globe Award. He received the Academy Award for Best Director and the BAFTA Award for Outstanding British Film for the biographical drama film The King's Speech (2010). For his work in television he earned the Primetime Emmy Award for Outstanding Directing for a Limited or Anthology Series or Movie for the HBO miniseries Elizabeth I (2005).

== Major Associations ==
=== Academy Awards ===
The Academy Awards are a set of awards given annually for excellence of cinematic achievements. The awards, organized by the Academy of Motion Picture Arts and Sciences, were first held in 1929 at the Hollywood Roosevelt Hotel. Hooper has received one award from one nomination.

Year	Category	Nominated work	Result	Ref.
2011	Best Director	The King's Speech	Won	

=== BAFTA Awards ===
The BAFTA Award is an annual award show presented by the British Academy of Film and Television Arts. The awards were founded in 1947 as The British Film Academy, by David Lean, Alexander Korda, Carol Reed, Charles Laughton, Roger Manvell and others. Hooper has received one award from four nominations.

Year	Category	Nominated work	Result	Ref.
British Academy Film Awards
2011	Best Direction	The King's Speech	Nominated	
2011	Best British Film	The King's Speech	Won	
2013	Best British Film	Les Misérables	Nominated	
2016	Best British Film	The Danish Girl	Nominated	
British Academy Television Awards
2004	Best Drama Series	Prime Suspect	Nominated	
2007	Best Drama Series	Longford	Nominated	
2007	Best Director	Longford	Nominated	

=== Emmy Awards ===
Year	Category	Nominated work	Result	Ref.
Primetime Emmy Awards
2004	Outstanding Directing for a Limited Series or Movie	Prime Suspect	Nominated	
2006	Outstanding Directing for a Limited Series or Movie	Elizabeth I	Won	
2008	Outstanding Directing for a Limited Series or Movie	John Adams	Nominated	

=== Golden Globe Awards ===
The Golden Globe Award is an accolade bestowed by the 93 members of the Hollywood Foreign Press Association (HFPA) recognizing excellence in film and television, both domestic and foreign.

Year	Category	Nominated work	Result	Ref.
2011	Best Director	The King's Speech	Nominated	

== Guild Awards ==
=== Directors Guild of America Awards ===
Year	Category	Nominated work	Result	Ref.
2010	Outstanding Directing – Feature Film	The King's Speech	Won	
2012	Outstanding Directing – Feature Film	Les Misérables	Nominated	

== Miscellaneous Awards ==
=== Golden Raspberry Awards ===
Year	Category	Nominated work	Result	Ref.
2020	Worst Picture	Cats	Won	
2020	Worst Director	Cats	Won	
2020	Worst Screenplay	Cats	Won	

== Other awards ==
Year	Award	Category	Title	Result
2004	IFFI Special Jury Award	Special Award	Red Dust	Won
2005	BIFF Golden Kinnaree Award	Best Film	Red Dust	Nominated
2007	British Academy Television Craft Award	Best Director	Longford	Nominated
2009	Directors Guild of America Award	Outstanding Directorial Achievement in Movies for Television/Miniseries	John Adams	Nominated
2010	Hollywood Award	Hollywood Film Director	The King's Speech	Won
2010	British Independent Film Award	Best Director	The King's Speech	Nominated
2010	Detroit Film Critics Society Award	Best Director	The King's Speech	Nominated
2010	Chicago Film Critics Association Award	Best Director	The King's Speech	Nominated
2010	Satellite Award	Best Director	The King's Speech	Nominated
2010	Dallas-Fort Worth Film Critics Association Award	Best Director	The King's Speech	Nominated
2010	Sierra Award	Best Director	The King's Speech	Nominated
2010	St. Louis Gateway Film Critics Association Award	Best Director	The King's Speech	Nominated
2010	Central Ohio Film Critics Association Award	Best Director	The King's Speech	Nominated
2010	EDA Award	Best Director	The King's Speech	Nominated
2010	Critics' Choice Movie Award	Best Director	The King's Speech	Nominated
2010	London Film Critics' Circle Award	British Director of the Year	The King's Speech	Won
2010	Independent Spirit Award	Best Foreign Film	The King's Speech	Won
2010	Empire Award	Best Director	The King's Speech	Nominated
2012	Critics Choice Awards	Best Director	Les Misérables	Nominated
2015	Satellite Awards	Best Director	The Danish Girl	Nominated
2015	Venice Film Festival	Golden Lion	The Danish Girl	Nominated
