= The Damned United =

2009 film

- Theatrical release poster
- Directed by: Tom Hooper
- Screenplay by: Peter Morgan
- Based on: The Damned Utd by David Peace
- Produced by: Andy Harries; Grainne Marmion
- Starring: Michael Sheen; Timothy Spall; Colm Meaney; Jim Broadbent
- Cinematography: Ben Smithard
- Edited by: Melanie Oliver
- Music by: Rob Lane
- Production company: Left Bank Pictures
- Distributed by: Sony Pictures Releasing International (Note: Released by Sony Pictures Classics in the United States and Canada and by Sony Pictures Releasing International through Columbia Pictures in other countries; financed by Columbia Pictures, BBC Films and Screen Yorkshire.)
- Release date: 27 March 2009
- Running time: 97 minutes
- Country: United Kingdom
- Language: English
- Budget: $6.4 million
- Box office: $4.1 million

The Damned United is a 2009 British sports drama film directed by Tom Hooper and adapted by Peter Morgan from David Peace's bestselling 2006 novel The Damned Utd – a largely fictional book based on the author's interpretation of Brian Clough's ill-fated tenure as football manager of Leeds United in 1974.

Originally proposed by Stephen Frears, he pulled out of the project in November 2007, and Hooper took over. Filming took place from May to July 2008. Marking the fifth collaboration between screenwriter Peter Morgan and actor Michael Sheen, who plays Clough, the film was released in the United Kingdom on 27 March 2009.

Despite controversy due to the film's numerous historical inaccuracies and its poor performance at the box office, The Damned United received critical acclaim upon release, with particular praise given for Sheen's performance. It received numerous award nominations including the British Independent Film Award for Best Supporting Actor, the ALFS Award for British Supporting Actor of the Year, the Satellite Award for Best Actor in a Motion Picture, Drama and Best Actor in a Supporting Role and the Writers' Guild of Great Britain Award for Best Feature Film Screenplay.

== Plot ==
In 1974 Don Revie, the highly successful manager of Leeds United, is appointed manager of England. He is replaced at Leeds by Brian Clough, the former manager of Derby County and a fierce critic of Leeds because of their physical style of play under Revie. Clough's conflict with Leeds stems from a 1968 FA Cup match when they, the leaders of the First Division, played Derby, who were struggling near the bottom of the Second Division. Despite preparations Clough made to welcome and accommodate Leeds at the Baseball Ground, Revie did not even acknowledge him before, during or after the match, which Leeds won 2–0. Clough is not joined at Leeds by his long-time assistant manager, Peter Taylor.

Following the defeat by Leeds, Clough and Taylor recognise that despite their players' physicality, Derby are not good on a technical level. They sign Dave Mackay and several young players, initially concerning club chairman Sam Longson, but by the season's end Derby are promoted to the First Division. Despite losing their first league game 5–0 to Leeds, Derby go on to win their first League championship in 1972, earning them a European Cup campaign the following season. Against Longson's insistence to rest players ahead of their semi-final against Juventus, Clough plays his best squad in the preceding match against Leeds, purely out of determination to beat Revie. Several Derby players suffer injuries in the match and the team subsequently lose 3–1 to Juventus.

Taylor suffers a heart attack and Clough tries to secure their position at Derby by offering his and Taylor's resignations in protest at Longson's ownership of the club. Longson accepts the resignations and despite Derby fans calling for their reinstatement, Dave Mackay is appointed manager instead. Clough and Taylor then accept jobs at Brighton & Hove Albion, after which Clough is approached to become the new manager of Leeds. With Taylor wanting to stay in Brighton, believing they can achieve more success there than at Leeds, the two fall out and go their separate ways. At his first training session at Leeds, Clough alienates the players by accusing them of having only previously won by cheating and threatening punishments for anyone who mentions Revie's name.

The 1974–75 season begins with Leeds playing Liverpool in the widely anticipated Charity Shield match at Wembley. The event is marred when Leeds's Billy Bremner gets into a fight with Kevin Keegan that sees them both sent off; Leeds lose the match and Bremner is suspended for eleven games. Without their influential captain, Leeds suffer a horrendous start to the season and are in danger of relegation despite being defending title holders. Bremner and the Leeds players air their grievances with Clough to the club's board, who terminate his contract after just 44 days. Afterwards, Clough agrees to an exit interview with Yorkshire Television, but finds Revie there to confront him and the two engage in a bitter war of words. Clough subsequently drives to Brighton and reconciles with Taylor.

The film's epilogue reveals that Revie failed as England manager and spent the rest of his career working in the Middle East, where he was accused of financial mismanagement. Clough and Taylor, meanwhile, reunited at Nottingham Forest, where they repeated their achievements with Derby by helping Forest earn promotion to the First Division, then winning the title and two European Cups in succession.

== Cast ==
- Michael Sheen as Brian Clough
- Timothy Spall as Peter Taylor
- Colm Meaney as Don Revie
- Jim Broadbent as Sam Longson
- Andy Graham as Terry Cooper
- Maurice Roëves as Jimmy Gordon
- Elizabeth Carling as Barbara Clough
- Oliver Stokes as Nigel Clough
- Ryan Day as Simon Clough
- Peter Quinn as Bob Matthewson
- Henry Goodman as Manny Cussins
- Jimmy Reddington as Keith Archer
- Liam Thomas as Les Cocker
- Danny Tomlinson as David Harvey
- Lesley Maylett as Paul Reaney
- Chris Moore as Paul Madeley
- John Savage as Gordon McQueen
- Mark Cameron as Norman Hunter
- Tom Ramsbottom as Trevor Cherry
- Matthew Storton as Peter Lorimer
- Peter McDonald as Johnny Giles
- Stephen Graham as Billy Bremner
- Bill Bradshaw as Terry Yorath
- Stuart Gray as Eddie Gray
- Alex Harker as Allan Clarke
- Craig Williams as Joe Jordan
- Joe Dempsie as Duncan McKenzie
- Brian McCardie as Dave Mackay
- Martin Compston as John O'Hare
- Colin Harris as John McGovern
- Giles Alderson as Colin Todd
- Stewart Robertson as Archie Gemmill
- Laurie Rea as Terry Hennessey
- Tomasz Kocinski as Roy McFarland
- Mark Bazeley as Austin Mitchell
- Elliot Stroud as solicitor
- Mark Jameson as head groundsman
- David Stevenson and Nathan Head as reporters
- Chris Wilson as FA disciplinary committee chairman
- Ralph Ineson as a crazy wild-haired reporter
- William Martyn Conboy as Key reporter, Revie departure scene
- Paul O'Brien as Paul Thompson
- John Craven as himself
- Tony Gubba as himself
- Jimmy Hill as himself
- Paul Bown as Mike Bamber
- Barry Davies as himself (uncredited)
- David Coleman as himself (uncredited)

== Production ==
=== Development ===
In 2006, Stephen Frears read The Damned Utd while travelling to the Venice Film Festival. He enjoyed the book and talked with The Queen producer Andy Harries about it. He then sent it to Peter Morgan, with whom he also worked on The Queen, on the eve of that film's premiere in Venice; Morgan read it by the next morning. Morgan enjoyed it, stating, "It deals with themes I love: Alcoholism and self-destruction and psychotic male competitiveness and treachery." Development of the project continued through February 2007, when BBC Films executive producer Christine Langan, another producer of The Queen, became involved. Frears had Michael Sheen in mind for Clough right from the start. Sheen had appeared in three other Frears projects: Mary Reilly, The Deal and The Queen. He was chosen because of his physical resemblance to Clough. When Frears suggested to Sheen that he play the part, Sheen "rolled his eyes and burst into a wonderful impersonation" of Clough. Sheen said Clough was "one of those people who's decided he's going to shape the rest of the world in his image. Inevitably there's something in us that recognises that that's playing with fire and the gods will have to strike you down."

With Frears as director, principal photography was scheduled for the end of 2007. He pulled out of the film in November, stating that he could not work out the logistics of the film and that he had "set out in pursuit of something that was leading him down a blind alley". Tom Hooper, who directed Morgan's Longford, replaced him. Hooper researched Clough by reading Duncan Hamilton's Provided You Don't Kiss Me, an award-winning biography of Clough. He also planned to meet Clough's family and some of the Leeds players during Clough's tenure. Casting continued through to May 2008. In April, Colm Meaney, Timothy Spall and Jim Broadbent were announced as Don Revie, Peter Taylor and Sam Longson respectively. During pre-production, Langan had viewed archive footage of Clough and Revie and considered whether Revie should be played by an actor much older than Sheen; despite being 47 in the footage, Revie "could pass for 60". Before Meaney was cast, the younger Kenneth Branagh had been considered. Non-league Garforth Town A.F.C. held auditions for non-speaking football players on 14 May. Auditionees were expected to have played in the Northern Counties East League, Northern Premier League, or higher. Casting for extras took place on 20 and 21 May.

=== Filming ===
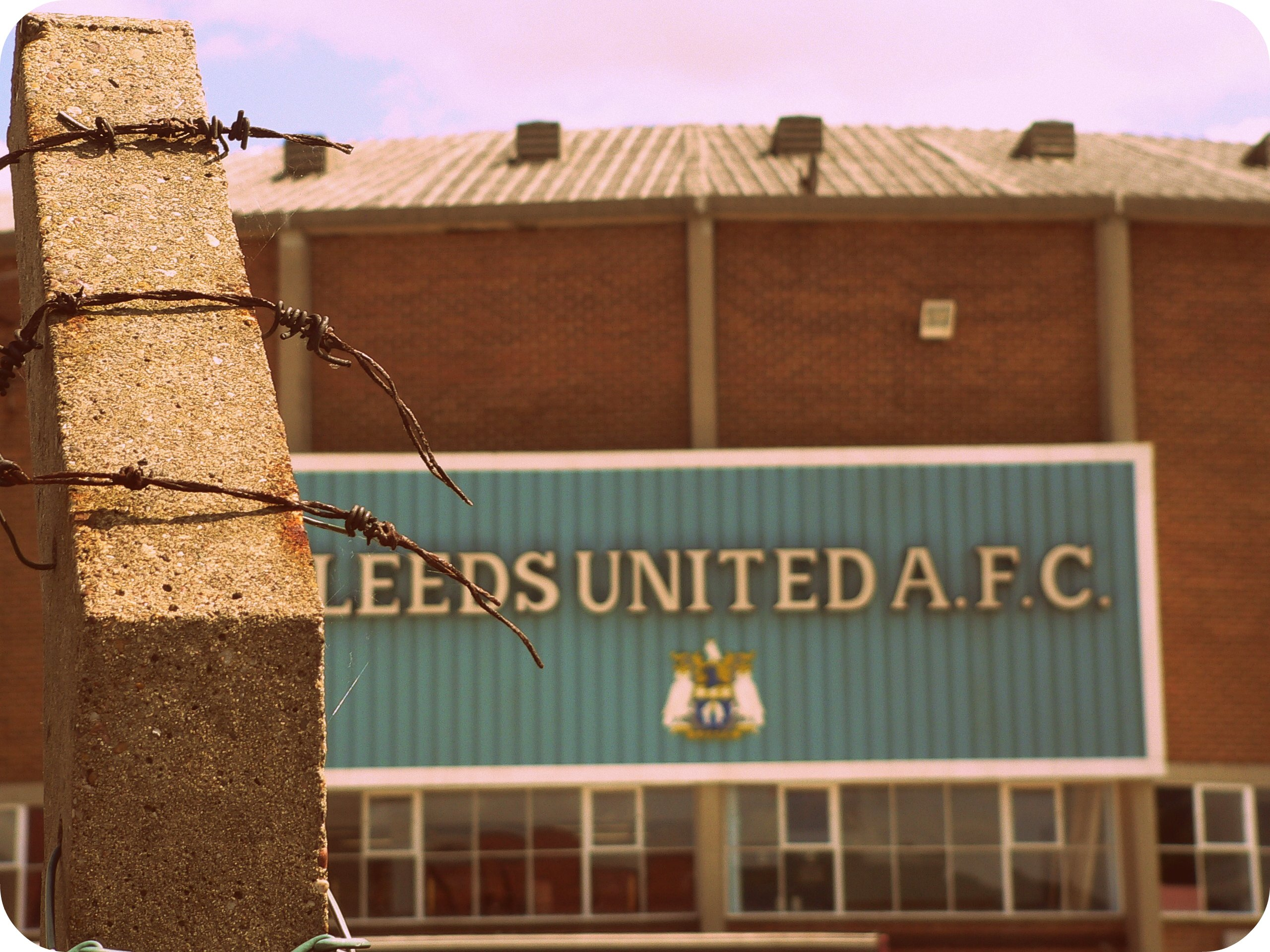
Alterations to Elland Road for filming.

Principal photography ran from 25 May to 2 July at locations in Yorkshire, Derbyshire and Mallorca. Chesterfield F.C.'s Saltergate stood in for Wembley Stadium, the Baseball Ground, Carrow Road, and Bloomfield Road. Saltergate was chosen because it had not undergone any significant structural modifications since the 1970s, though some repainting work was done by the production team to differentiate the grounds from each other. The car park outside Elland Road was dressed to look like the Leeds training ground (until the move to the training facilities at Thorp Arch in the early 1990s, Leeds United's training ground was indeed located next to the stadium). Other locations used in Leeds include Headingley Stadium, the former site of Cookridge Hospital, and a linen hire firm in Armley. The recreations of the television interviews (based on those conducted on the regional news show Calendar) were filmed at the same location as the originals, these being the Yorkshire Television Studios in Kirkstall Road, Leeds. Further exteriors scenes were shot in Armley, Beeston and Adel. The training ground used by Derby County was the quarry football pitch which is nearby to the Elland Road Stadium.

The former Bradford Central Police Station on The Tyrls in Bradford city centre, was used for the interiors of the Elland Road board room, players' lounge and manager's office. The building was demolished in 2015.

During the week of 23 June, filming took place in Scarborough, in place of Brighton. Interior scenes were filmed in the Victoria Sea View Hotel and the Esplanade Hotel. Exteriors were filmed on the Queens Parade and at nearby Scalby Mills. Computer-generated imagery was added in post-production to make Scarborough look like Brighton. The Royal Hotel in Scarborough was also used. Filming then moved on to Saddleworth before concluding in Mallorca.

== Release ==
The first television trailer premiered on Setanta Sports 1 on 23 January 2009 before the kick-off of the FA Cup fourth round tie between Derby County and Nottingham Forest. The distribution rights were originally pre-sold by Ealing Studios International to Optimum Releasing. Sony Pictures Entertainment made a higher offer to the production companies and would distribute the film worldwide. It was released in the UK on 27 March 2009. A gala screening of the film was held at the 2009 Toronto International Film Festival in September 2009, the film went on a limited release in the United States on 9 October that year.

=== Box office ===
The film earned a total of US$3,604,339 in the UK and Republic of Ireland, and in Canada and the US, it earned US$441,264; the worldwide box office take was US$4,045,603.

== Reception ==
=== Critical response ===
The Damned United was acclaimed by film critics. On the review aggregator Rotten Tomatoes, the film has an approval rating of 92% based on 121 reviews, with an average rating of 7.5/10. The website's critical consensus reads, "Better than your average football pic, Damned United is carried by another star turn from Michael Sheen as Brian Clough." Metacritic assigned the film a weighted average score of 81 out of 100, based on 27 critics, indicating "universal acclaim".

Roger Ebert of the Chicago Sun-Times gave the film three and a half stars out of four, and praised Sheen for portraying "modern British icons so uncannily that he's all but disappeared into them". Peter Bradshaw of The Guardian gave the film four stars out of five, calling it "fresh, intelligent... [and] terrifically involving", and also praised Sheen and Meaney's performances. Empire's reviewer William Thomas awarded The Damned United three stars out of five. He praised the film for "capturing the emotional toil of football", although added that it "struggles to find its stride".

Prior to its release, Clough's widow Barbara, already a critic of Peace's book, expressed disappointment that the film was being made at all. The Clough family declined an invitation to a preview of the film, affirming their opposition to the entire project. Clough's son Nigel said he did not intend to watch the film and that those in football who had seen it had told him it bore "no resemblance" to what actually happened. Sony's decision to release the film six days after what would have been Clough's 74th birthday was also criticised.

Producer Andy Harries responded to the Clough family's criticisms by stating that "The filmmakers' goal is to tell a wonderful and extraordinary story with universal themes of success, jealousy and betrayal". Harries added that without adding fictional elements the film would not have been as exciting to watch. He also reassured Clough's family that the film would be a more sympathetic portrayal of Clough than in the book. Writer Peter Morgan claimed that he did not feel the film's accuracy was of major importance.

=== Historical accuracy ===
Dave Mackay sued Left Bank Pictures over his portrayal in the film, angered at the implication that he had betrayed Clough in taking the Derby manager's job. Martin O'Neill, who played for Mackay at Nottingham Forest before his departure to manage Derby, suggested that the film falsely implied Mackay was still a player at Derby County when becoming manager of the club, whilst also questioning the portrayal of the relationship between Clough and Peter Taylor, though he praised the performances of the actors, particularly Sheen's. In March 2010, Mackay received an apology and undisclosed damages from Left Bank Pictures. Roy McFarland agreed with Mackay's decision to take legal action and said that he enjoyed Sheen's performance, but otherwise "did not particularly like the film".

The publishers of the novel had already been successfully sued by Irish midfielder and former Leeds player Johnny Giles. He wrote: "Many of the things Peace talks about in the book never happened and, for that reason, I felt it necessary to go to the courts to establish that this was fiction based on fact and nothing more."

BBC Sport journalist Pat Murphy, a personal friend of Clough, noted 17 factual inaccuracies in the film, including various errors regarding the timing of events. He particularly dismissed as "absolute nonsense" a scene where Clough stays in the Derby dressing room during a match against Leeds, too nervous to watch.

In the film it is shown that three signings are made by Clough at once, those of Dave Mackay, John McGovern and John O'Hare. However, O'Hare was signed almost a year before Mackay, and McGovern and Mackay were signed on different days. Murphy also declared that the insinuation that Clough did not want to debate with Revie about his tenure at Leeds United is completely inaccurate.

Murphy was also angered by the portrayal of Clough's drinking and smoking. He insisted that throughout the 1970s Clough was a perfectly fit manager who often actively trained with players during training ground matches, and that the portrayal of him drinking and smoking heavily was a battle he faced approximately 10–20 years after he became manager of Nottingham Forest in 1975.

In the film, Clough is seen preparing Derby's Baseball Ground ahead of the 1968 FA Cup tie against Leeds United and Revie blanking him on the way into the ground. In fact, the tie was played at Elland Road, Leeds' home ground. Brian Clough managed Brighton & Hove Albion for 32 games before he departed in July 1974. The film insinuates that Clough took the Leeds job whilst on holiday in Mallorca in 1974, having previously accepted the Brighton job on a handshake and taking the holiday, paid for by the club, before starting work, implying he never actually managed the team. Taylor and Clough are also seen to argue fiercely in Mallorca over the Leeds manager's job offer. There is no record of Clough arguing with Taylor over joining him at Leeds nor a lack of interest in Brighton.

The film says that Leeds lost 1–0 to Luton Town during Clough's reign; this game, played on 7 September 1974, in fact finished 1–1 with Barry Butlin equalising for Luton after Leeds took the lead through Allan Clarke.

The film shows Clough standing outside an entrance to Derby County's Baseball Ground featuring the stylised ram emblem, in 1968; in reality, the emblem was not designed until 1971.

The film implies that Derby's 5–0 defeat to Leeds occurred in the 1969–70 season, soon after their promotion to the First Division, with Gordon McQueen playing for Leeds United against them in the match. In reality, the 5–0 result occurred in October 1972, the season after Derby won the 1972 First Division title and the fourth season since their promotion. It was McQueen's first year as a Leeds player; he was not at the club in 1969.

The film shows suspended Billy Bremner sitting next to Clough in the dugout during a match. In reality, suspended players/coaching staff are not allowed to sit in the dugout during matches.

The film implies Clough reunited with Taylor straight after leaving Elland Road in September 1974. However, Taylor managed Brighton & Hove Albion by himself for the 1974/75 and 1975/76 seasons, with Clough joining Nottingham Forest in January 1975 and Taylor joining him in July 1976.

=== Awards and nominations ===
Award	Category	Nominee	Result
British Independent Film Award	Best Supporting Actor	Jim Broadbent	Nominated
ALFS Award	British Supporting Actor of the Year	Timothy Spall	Nominated
Satellite Award	Best Actor in a Motion Picture, Drama	Michael Sheen	Nominated
Satellite Award	Best Actor in a Supporting Role	Timothy Spall	Nominated
Writers' Guild of Great Britain Award	Best Feature Film Screenplay	Peter Morgan	Nominated

== See also ==
- List of association football films
