= Roger Windsor =

British trade union leader

Roger Edward Windsor (born 8 January 1945) was chief executive of the National Union of Mineworkers (NUM) between 1983 and 1989, including during the 1984 miners' strike. He later moved to France and then to Herefordshire.

== Early life ==
His parents were Edward Windsor (1912–2004) and Irene Pitcher (1916–1999). He grew up in West London, attending Hampton Grammar School.

== Career ==
He had worked for the retailer Millets, and was a scout leader in the 1960s.

From 1973 he worked for Public Services International, which moved its headquarters to Feltham. He was a Hounslow Labour councillor for four years.

=== NUM ===
Windsor was accused of damaging the image of the union by visiting Libya during the strike and meeting Colonel Gaddafi, at the time an enemy of the United Kingdom. Windsor went to Libya, possibly in an attempt to put NUM funds beyond the reach of the government. Both Mick McGahey, vice president of the NUM, and Peter Heathfield, general secretary, denied knowing about this trip before it was revealed in the press. For reasons still not clear, Windsor met Colonel Gaddafi and film of the two men embracing was shown on British TV. The Sunday Times' report on his visit was credited by some with substantially undermining public and parliamentary support for the miners.

In 1990, Windsor was involved in media reports concerning Arthur Scargill's misuse of union funds and receipt of funds from Libya, allegations which were substantially based on Windsor's evidence. The story was initially reported on the front page of the Daily Mirror and in the Central TV programme The Cook Report. Gavin Lightman QC was requested to undertake an enquiry into the manner in which NUM funds and the £1 million donation by Russian miners were used during and after the miners' strike and found that Scargill had failed to account properly for substantial amounts of money including bank accounts opened in the name of Scargill's mother and Nell Myers (Scargill's PA). The report also found that Windsor had not repaid the £29,500 that he had admitted taking from the Miners' Solidarity Fund.

Then Mirror editor Roy Greenslade later wrote an article apologising to Scargill for the false claim that he had used Libyan money to pay off his mortgage and for relying on Windsor as a source, given that Windsor had still not repaid the £29,500 as of 2002, when the Court of Cassation in France had ordered that he repay the money.

Some of his actions during and after the strike led to accusations that he was an agent of MI5. The allegations were raised by George Galloway in Parliament in 1993 and 1994, but could not be challenged outside it due to parliamentary privilege. After the allegation was repeated in a 21 May 2000 newspaper article in the Sunday Express by Rupert Allason, Windsor in 2003 won a libel action against the Express and its then editor, Rosie Boycott. The head of the MI5 branch responsible for 'monitoring' unions and strike activity at the time of the strike, Dame Stella Rimington, gave an unusual denial in 2001, saying that Windsor was "never an agent in any sense of the word that you can possibly imagine", and, in breach of normal government protocol, John Major, the Prime Minister, made an official statement that Roger Windsor was never involved with the government.

Windsor was portrayed as Terry Winters in David Peace's novel GB84.

== Personal life ==
On 19 November 1971 he married Angela Christine Cicognani.

At the time of the miners strike, he had lived on Lower Street in Stroud for five years, with his wife Angela and his three children. He worked with the Stroud Labour group. He stood in the May 1983 election for Painswick. His wife stood in the Stonehouse ward in 1983. He moved to a £55,000 house around July 1984.
