= Richard Hooper (civil servant) =

British civil servant and radio/television producer

Richard Hooper CBE is a British former civil servant and radio and television producer. He was Deputy Chairman of OFCOM between 2002 and 2005.

== Career ==
His began his career as a radio and TV producer in the BBC, and was a founder of the Open University. Between 1972 and 1977 he was Director of NDPCAL, National Development Programme in Computer Aided Learning, a government funded project that ran from 1973 until 1977, costing £2.5M and supporting some 35 projects covering schools, colleges, universities, industrial and military training. At BT he ran the world's first commercial videotex service, Prestel. He ran the pan-European satellite television channel Super Channel owned by the ITV companies. He was Chairman of the Radio Authority from 2000 to 2003, Deputy Chairman of Ofcom from 2002 to 2005, and Chairman of Informa from 2005 to 2007. He carried out the independent review of the Royal Mail for Peter Mandelson and Vince Cable which recommended privatisation.

He currently is Chair of the Broadband Stakeholder Group and the Copyright Hub Launch Group, which came out of the review of copyright licensing Richard did for Vince Cable in 2011/12. He is senior independent director on the boards of hibu plc (formerly Yell Group plc) and VocaLink Holdings Ltd.

== Personal life ==
He was married to the Australian writer and historian, Meredith Hooper, and lives in North London. He is the father of film director Tom Hooper.
