= Quayside (TV series) =

- Country of origin: United Kingdom
- No. of series: 1
- No. of episodes: 17

Production
- Producer: Zenith North Television

Original release
- Network: Tyne Tees Television and Yorkshire Television
- Release: 7 January – 6 May 1997

Quayside is a soap opera recounting the lives of young people living on the Newcastle Quayside produced by Zenith North Television and aired in 1997 on Tyne Tees Television in North East England and Yorkshire Television in Yorkshire.

Tyne Tees Television produced this soap opera as a venture into becoming a regional soap opera alongside the larger soaps such as Coronation Street and EastEnders despite Tyne Tees not actually having a license commitment to regional drama.

Directed and produced by Matthew Robinson, and co-created and written by Brian B. Thompson, it starred Joe Caffrey, Emma Louise Webb Yvette Rowland and other North East actors, many of whom had appeared or went on to appear in Byker Grove and other local programmes.

Despite receiving 40% of the audience share when it started, ratings began to fall primarily due to its position in the schedules. It aired once weekly at 7.30pm, a slot which is traditionally dedicated to local programming and resulted being alongside EastEnders on BBC One.
