= The Damned Utd =

2006 novel by David Peace

- Author: David Peace
- Language: English
- Publisher: Faber and Faber
- Publication date: 17 August 2006
- Publication place: United Kingdom
- Media type: Print (paperback)
- Pages: 327
- ISBN: 978-0-571-22426-5
- OCLC: 65468278
- Dewey Decimal: 823/.914 22
- LC Class: PR6066.E116 D36 2006

The Damned Utd is a biographical novel by British author David Peace, published in 2006. Depicting events in the life of English football personality Brian Clough, it is set during Clough's brief and unsuccessful 44-day spell as manager of Leeds United during 1974, with frequent flashbacks to his earlier period as manager of Derby County. Despite critical acclaim, the novel was also the subject of controversy for its perceived negative portrayal of Clough and some historical inaccuracies. It was adapted into a film called The Damned United, released in 2009.

== Plot ==
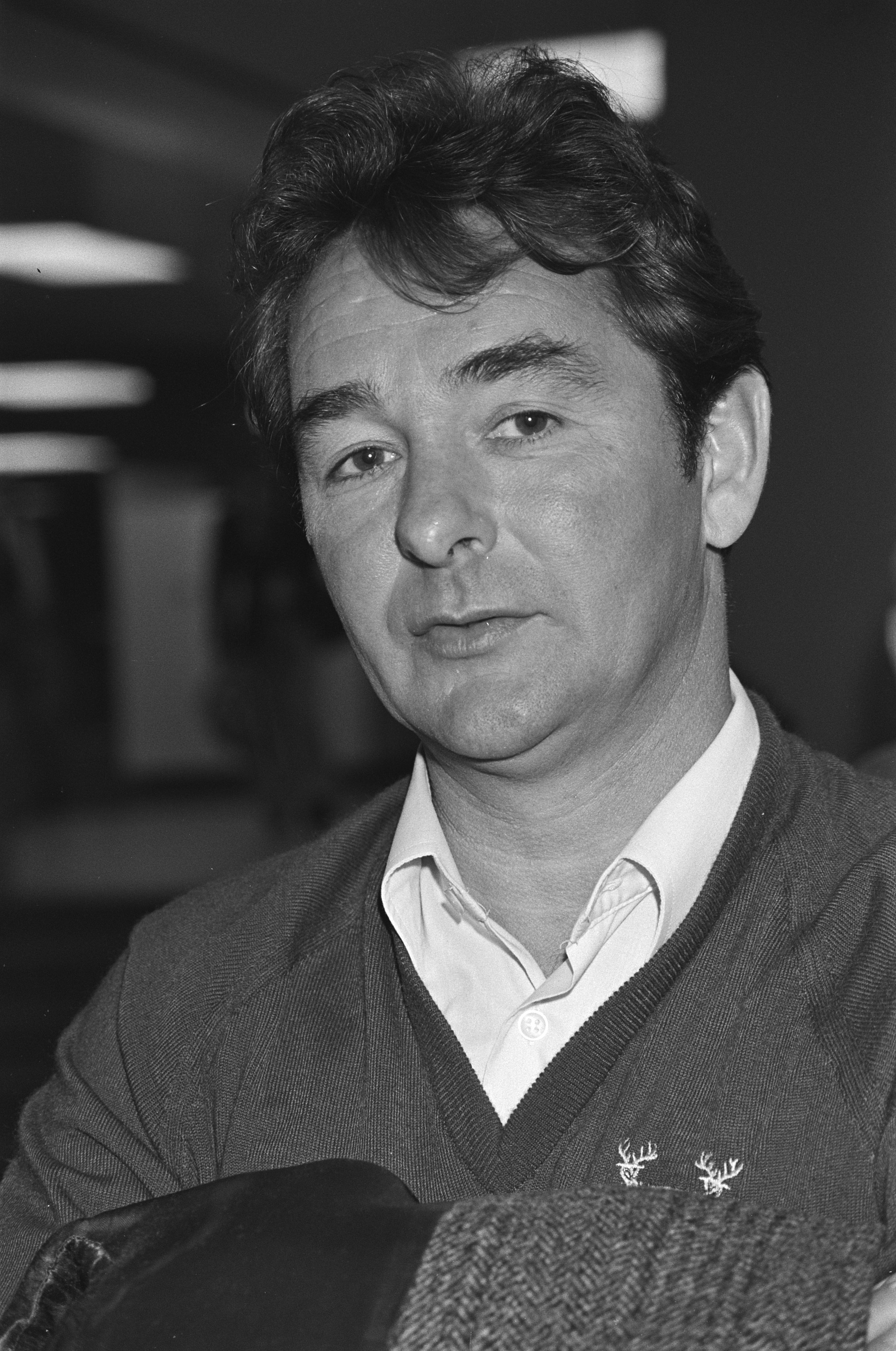
The novel is based on real events in the life of Brian Clough

Told from Clough's point of view, the novel is written as his stream of consciousness as he tries and fails to impose his will on a team he inherited from his bitter rival, Don Revie, and whose players are still loyal to their old manager. Interspersed are flashbacks to his more successful days as manager of Derby County. Described by its author as "a fiction based on a fact", the novel mixes fiction, rumour and speculation with documented facts to depict Clough as a deeply flawed hero; foul mouthed, vengeful and beset with inner demons and alcoholism.

== Reception ==
The Damned Utd was published by Faber and Faber in August 2006 to great critical acclaim and sold steadily – by the end of the year it had also become a word of mouth hit. The critical reaction to the book was generally positive. It was described by Rick Broadbent of The Times as "probably the best novel ever written about sport", while Chris Petit of The Guardian praised its imaginative use of Clough's inner voice, and the "warts and all" portrait of its protagonist. However, the portrayal of some of the characters has attracted controversy, and the book has been criticised by members of Clough's family as presenting an overly negative view of the late manager.

Leeds player Johnny Giles complained about the way he was portrayed in the book and claimed he had been libelled. Giles wrote, "Many of the things Peace talks about in the book never happened and for that reason, I felt it necessary to go to the Courts to establish that this was fiction based on fact and nothing more." Faber disagreed, and applied to strike out his claim. In an out-of-court settlement, Giles received a substantial sum to cover damages and costs, and got an apology from both publisher and author. Faber also made changes to the text.

== Adaptations ==
A screen adaptation of the novel starring Michael Sheen as Brian Clough was released in 2009 to critical acclaim.

The book was adapted for the stage by Red Ladder Theatre Company in 2016 and played at the West Yorkshire Playhouse in 2018.
