= David Peace =

English novelist

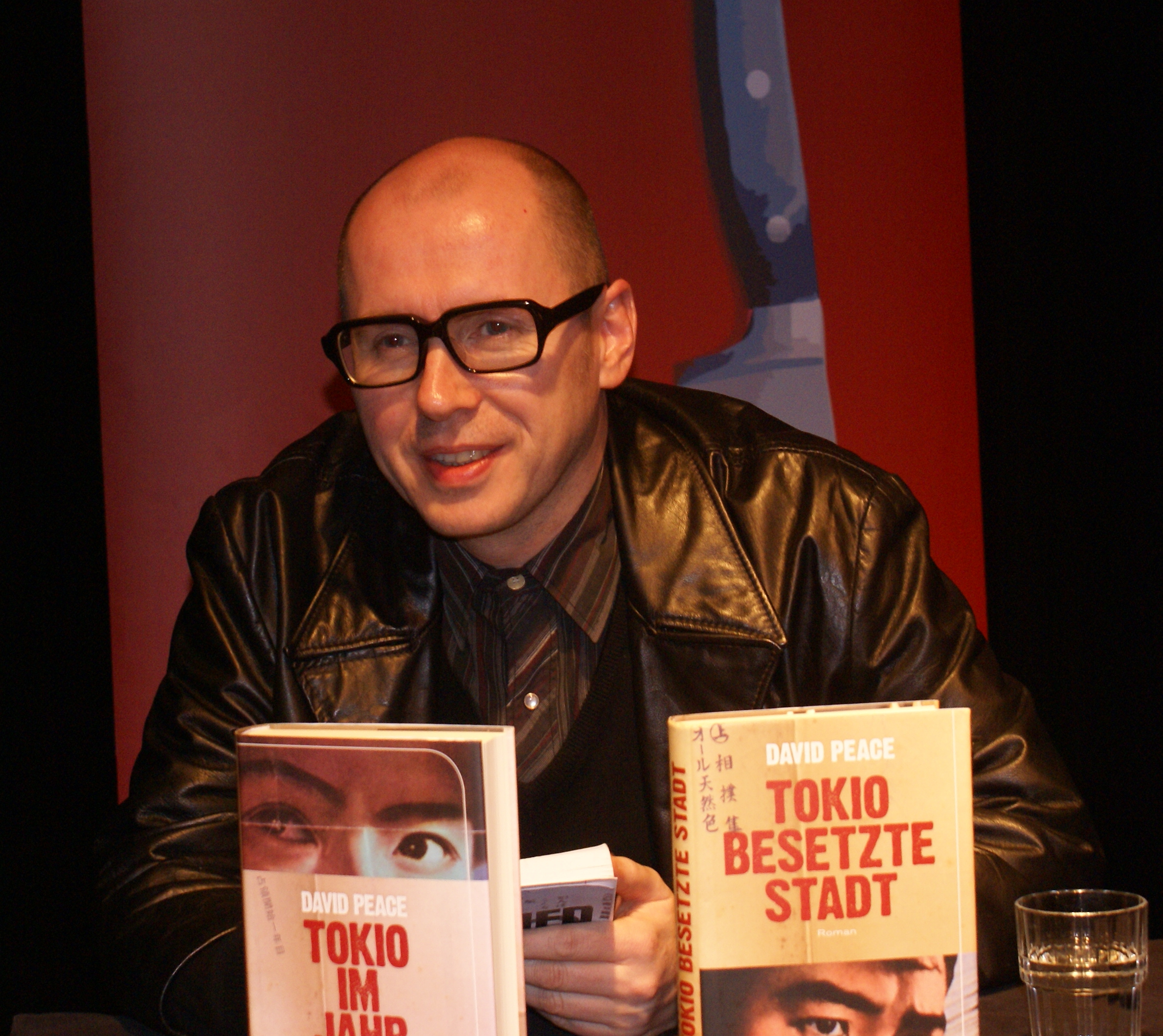
- Peace in 2010
- Born: 1967 (age 58–59); Dewsbury, West Riding of Yorkshire, England
- Education: Manchester Polytechnic
- Occupation: Writer
- Writing career
- Genre: Novel
- Notable works: Red Riding Quartet; The Damned Utd; Tokyo Trilogy

David Peace (born 1967) is an English writer. Best known for his UK-set novels Red Riding Quartet (1999–2002), GB84 (2004), The Damned Utd (2006), and Red or Dead (2013), Peace was named one of the Best of Young British Novelists by Granta in their 2003 list. His books often deal with themes of mental breakdown or derangement in the face of extreme circumstances. In an interview with David Mitchell, he stated: "I was drawn to writing about individuals and societies in moments that are often extreme, and often at times of defeat, be they personal or broader, or both. I believe that in such moments, during such times, in how we react and how we live, we learn who we truly are, for better or worse."

== Biography ==
David Peace was born in Dewsbury and grew up in Ossett, West Yorkshire. He was educated at Batley Grammar School, Wakefield College and Manchester Polytechnic, which he left in 1991 to go to Istanbul to teach English. He cites his father's book collection, and reading the NME between 1979 and 1985, as formative influences. He moved to Tokyo in 1994 and returned to the UK in 2009. He went back to Tokyo in 2011 because he found it hard to write in Britain. He has lectured in the Department of Contemporary Literary Studies at the University of Tokyo since his return to Tokyo in 2011.

== Red Riding Quartet ==
The Red Riding Quartet comprises the novels Nineteen Seventy-Four (1999), Nineteen Seventy-Seven (2000), Nineteen Eighty (2001) and Nineteen Eighty-Three (2002). The books deal with police corruption, and are set against a backdrop of the Yorkshire Ripper murders between 1975 and 1980. They feature several recurring characters. Red Riding, a three-part TV adaptation of the series, aired on Channel 4 in the UK in 2009. The cast includes Sean Bean, Andrew Garfield, David Morrissey and Rebecca Hall.

== GB84 ==
Peace followed the quartet with GB84 (2004). This is a fictional portrayal of the year of the UK miners' strike (1984–1985). It describes the insidious workings of the British government and MI5, the coalfield battles, the struggle for influence in government and the dwindling powers of the National Union of Mineworkers. The book was awarded the James Tait Black Memorial Prize for literature in 2005.

== The Damned Utd, Red or Dead ==
He followed GB84 with another fact-based fictional piece, The Damned Utd (2006), which is based on Brian Clough's fateful 44-day spell in 1974 as manager of Leeds United Football Club. Entering the mind of the man who many regard as a football genius, Peace tells the story of a man characterised by a fear of failure and a hunger for success. Peace has described it as an "occult history of Leeds United". Former footballer and manager Johnny Giles threatened to sue Peace for The Damned Utd as to what he perceived were gross untruths in the book. As part of an out of court settlement, the publisher of The Damned Utd, Faber and Faber, agreed to remove from any future editions the references perceived by Giles as damaging and untrue.

Peace is a supporter of Huddersfield Town, a club who are a local rival of Leeds United, and the team that Leeds United played in Clough's first and last games in charge of the club. The Damned Utd has been made into a film entitled The Damned United, with Michael Sheen playing Brian Clough.

Peace's novel Red or Dead, about Bill Shankly and the rise of Liverpool Football Club, was published in August 2013 and was shortlisted for the Goldsmiths Prize that year.

== Tokyo Trilogy ==
Tokyo Year Zero (2007) follows the investigations of a Tokyo detective in the aftermath of Japan's defeat in World War II. It is based on the true story of serial killer Yoshio Kodaira. It is the first of Peace's novels to be set outside of Yorkshire and forms the first part of a trio of books on the U.S. military occupation of Japan. The second book, published in August 2009, is called Occupied City, a Rashomon-like telling of the Hirasawa Sadamichi case in Tokyo in 1948. The final volume, Tokyo Redux, published in 2021, is based on the 1949 Shimoyama incident.

As a separate stand-alone novel, but set in Japan, Patient X, was published in 2018. Subtitled The Case-Book of Ryūnosuke Akutagawa, it follows the life of author Akutagawa from his childhood to his suicide in 1927, including his witnessing of the Great Kantō earthquake that devastated most of Tokyo and much of the surrounding region in 1923.

== Plans ==
Peace's plans include UKDK, about the changing face of UK politics, set around the fall of Harold Wilson and rise of Margaret Thatcher, and titles possibly including The Yorkshire Rippers and Nineteen Forty Seven. He has also begun preparing a novel about Geoffrey Boycott and his relationship with Yorkshire County Cricket Club and England. He intends to stop writing novels after his twelfth novel but has joked he may publish a collection of his "very bad poetry".

== Bibliography ==
=== Red Riding Quartet ===
- 1999 Nineteen Seventy-Four
- 2000 Nineteen Seventy-Seven
- 2001 Nineteen Eighty
- 2002 Nineteen Eighty-Three

=== Tokyo Trilogy ===
- 2007 Tokyo Year Zero
- 2009 Occupied City
- 2021 Tokyo Redux

=== Novels ===
- 2004 GB84
- 2006 The Damned Utd
- 2013 Red or Dead
- 2018 Patient X: the Case-Book of Ryūnosuke Akutagawa
- 2024 Munichs

=== Essays, reporting, and other contributions ===
- Peace, David (10–17 June 2013). "The Ripper". True Crimes. The New Yorker. Vol. 89, no. 17. pp. 74–75.

== Awards ==
- 2003 Best of Young British Novelists (Granta)
- 2005 James Tait Black Memorial Prize (GB84)

== Discography ==
=== Vox ===
Release	Title	Artist	Track	Label
17 November 2020	TOKYO YEAR ZERO Album	Cam Lasky	2. Tokyo Hour Zero (Original Mix); 4. Already Dead (Original Mix); 20. Adachi or Senju (Original Mix); 21. C3-4 – Atro-City (Original Mix); 28. My War (Alternate Mix); 31. Tokyo Year Zero (Original Mix)	KWAIOTO Records
